= 53rd New York State Legislature =

New York state legislative session

←	52nd	54th	→
- The Old State Capitol (1879)

Overview
- Legislative body: New York State Legislature
- Jurisdiction: New York, United States
- Term: January 1 – December 31, 1830

Senate
- Members: 32
- Temporary President: William M. Oliver (J)
- Party control: Jacksonian

Assembly
- Members: 128
- Speaker: Erastus Root (J)
- Party control: Jacksonian

Sessions
- 1st: January 5 – April 20, 1830

The 53rd New York State Legislature, consisting of the New York State Senate and the New York State Assembly, met from January 5 to April 20, 1830, during the second year of Enos T. Throop's governorship, in Albany.

== Background ==
Under the provisions of the New York Constitution of 1821, 32 senators were elected on general tickets in eight senatorial districts for four-year terms. They were divided into four classes, and every year eight Senate seats came up for election. Assemblymen were elected countywide on general tickets to a one-year term, the whole Assembly being renewed annually.

State Senator Robert Bogardus resigned on May 4, 1829, leaving a vacancy in the First District.

At this time, there were three political parties: the "Jacksonians" (supporting President Andrew Jackson; led by U.S. Secretary of State Martin Van Buren), the "Anti-Jacksonians" (the former supporters of John Quincy Adams, opposing Jackson and the Albany Regency), and the "Anti-Masons". In New York City, a Workingmen's Party appeared, and polled a large number of votes, winning a seat in the Assembly. In 1830, the Anti-Jacksonians re-organized as the National Republican Party (supporting Henry Clay for the presidency).

== Elections ==
The state election was held from November 2 to 4, 1829. Alpheus Sherman, Jonathan S. Conklin (both 1st D.), Nathaniel P. Tallmadge (2nd D.), William Dietz (3rd D.), Isaac Gere (4th D.), Alvin Bronson (5th D.), Levi Beardsley (6th D.), Albert H. Tracy (8th D.) and Assemblyman Thomas Armstrong (7th D.) were elected to the Senate. Tracy was an Anti-Mason; the other eight were Jacksonians.

== Sessions ==
The legislature met for the regular session at the Old State Capitol in Albany on January 5, 1830, and adjourned on April 20.

Erastus Root (J) was again elected Speaker, receiving 93 votes against 30 for Francis Granger (A-M); and William M. Oliver (J) was elected president pro tempore of the State Senate.

On January 8, Conklin and Sherman drew lots to decide which one of the two senators elected in the 1st District would serve the short term, and which one the full term. Conklin drew the short term, and Sherman the full term.

On February 12, the legislature re-elected State Treasurer Abraham Keyser, Jr. (J).

On April 13, a caucus of Jacksonian legislators, chaired by President pro tem William M. Oliver, resolved to call a state convention, to meet on September 8 at Herkimer, to nominate candidates for governor and lieutenant governor.

On April 16, a meeting of working men at the Old State Capitol in Albany nominated Speaker Erastus Root for governor. Root did neither accept nor decline the nomination for the time being, expecting either to be nominated by Jacksonians and decline, or to be slighted by the Jacksonians and accept. In June, a meeting of the Workingmen's Party at New York City endorsed the Albany nomination, but asked Root to state his position. Root declined, stating that he would support the Jacksonian nominee. The Workingmen then nominated Ezekiel Williams for governor, and Isaac S. Smith for lieutenant governor.

The Anti-Masonic state convention met in August at Utica, and nominated Assemblyman Francis Granger for governor, and Samuel Stevens, of New York City, for lieutenant governor.

The Jacksonian state convention met on September 8 at Herkimer and nominated Gov. Throop for re-election, and Edward P. Livingston for lieutenant governor.

== State Senate ==
=== Districts ===
- The First District (4 seats) consisted of Kings, New York, Queens, Richmond and Suffolk counties.
- The Second District (4 seats) consisted of Delaware, Dutchess, Orange, Putnam, Rockland, Sullivan, Ulster and Westchester counties.
- The Third District (4 seats) consisted of Albany, Columbia, Greene, Rensselaer, Schenectady and Schoharie counties.
- The Fourth District (4 seats) consisted of Clinton, Essex, Franklin, Hamilton, Montgomery, St. Lawrence, Saratoga, Warren and Washington counties.
- The Fifth District (4 seats) consisted of Herkimer, Jefferson, Lewis, Madison, Oneida and Oswego counties.
- The Sixth District (4 seats) consisted of Broome, Chenango, Cortland, Otsego, Steuben, Tioga and Tompkins counties.
- The Seventh District (4 seats) consisted of Cayuga, Onondaga, Ontario, Seneca, Wayne and Yates counties.
- The Eighth District (4 seats) consisted of Allegany, Cattaraugus, Chautauqua, Erie, Genesee, Livingston, Monroe, Niagara and Orleans counties.
Note: There are now 62 counties in the State of New York. The counties which are not mentioned in this list had not yet been established, or sufficiently organized, the area being included in one or more of the abovementioned counties.

=== Members ===
The asterisk (*) denotes members of the previous Legislature who continued in office as members of this Legislature. Thomas Armstrong changed from the Assembly to the Senate.

District	Senators	Term left	Party	Notes
First	Jonathan S. Conklin	1 year	Jacksonian	elected to fill vacancy, in place of Robert Bogardus
First	John I. Schenck*	2 years	Jacksonian	
First	Stephen Allen*	3 years	Jacksonian	
First	Alpheus Sherman	4 years	Jacksonian	
Second	Benjamin Woodward*	1 year	Jacksonian	also Postmaster of Mount Hope
Second	Walker Todd*	2 years	Jacksonian	also Postmaster of Carmel
Second	Samuel Rexford*	3 years	Jacksonian	
Second	Nathaniel P. Tallmadge	4 years	Jacksonian	
Third	John McCarty*	1 year	Jacksonian	
Third	Moses Warren*	2 years	Jacksonian	
Third	Lewis Eaton*	3 years	Jacksonian	
Third	William Dietz	4 years	Jacksonian	
Fourth	Duncan McMartin Jr.*	1 year	Nat. Rep.	
Fourth	Reuben Sanford*	2 years	Nat. Rep.	also Postmaster of Wilmington
Fourth	John McLean Jr.*	3 years	Nat. Rep.	
Fourth	Isaac Gere	4 years	Jacksonian	
Fifth	Truman Enos*	1 year	Jacksonian	
Fifth	Nathaniel S. Benton*	2 years	Jacksonian	
Fifth	William H. Maynard*	3 years	Anti-Mason	
Fifth	Alvin Bronson	4 years	Jacksonian	
Sixth	Thomas G. Waterman*	1 year	Jacksonian	
Sixth	Grattan H. Wheeler*	2 years	Jacksonian	in November 1830, elected to the 22nd U.S. Congress
Sixth	John F. Hubbard*	3 years	Jacksonian	
Sixth	Levi Beardsley	4 years	Jacksonian	
Seventh	William M. Oliver*	1 year	Jacksonian	elected President pro tempore
Seventh	George B. Throop*	2 years	Jacksonian	
Seventh	Hiram F. Mather*	3 years	Anti-Mason	
Seventh	Thomas Armstrong*	4 years	Jacksonian	also Supervisor of Butler, and Chairman of the Board of Supervisors of Wayne Co.
Eighth	George H. Boughton*	1 year	Anti-Mason	
Eighth	Timothy H. Porter*	2 years	Anti-Mason	
Eighth	Moses Hayden*	3 years	Anti-Mason	died on February 13, 1830
Eighth	Albert H. Tracy	4 years	Anti-Mason	

=== Employees ===
- Clerk: John F. Bacon

== State Assembly ==
=== Districts ===
- Albany County (3 seats)
- Allegany County (1 seat)
- Broome County (1 seat)
- Cattaraugus County (1 seat)
- Cayuga County (4 seats)
- Chautauqua County (2 seats)
- Chenango County (3 seats)
- Clinton County (1 seat)
- Columbia County (3 seats)
- Cortland County (2 seats)
- Delaware County (2 seats)
- Dutchess County (4 seats)
- Erie County (2 seats)
- Essex County (1 seat)
- Franklin County (1 seat)
- Genesee County (3 seats)
- Greene County (2 seats)
- Hamilton and Montgomery counties (3 seats)
- Herkimer County (3 seats)
- Jefferson County (3 seats)
- Kings County (1 seat)
- Lewis County (1 seat)
- Livingston County (2 seats)
- Madison County (3 seats)
- Monroe County (3 seats)
- The City and County of New York (11 seats)
- Niagara County (1 seat)
- Oneida County (5 seats)
- Onondaga County (4 seats)
- Ontario County (3 seats)
- Orange County (3 seats)
- Orleans County (1 seat)
- Oswego County (1 seat)
- Otsego County (4 seats)
- Putnam County (1 seat)
- Queens County (1 seat)
- Rensselaer County (4 seats)
- Richmond County (1 seat)
- Rockland County (1 seat)
- St. Lawrence County (2 seats)
- Saratoga County (3 seats)
- Schenectady County (1 seat)
- Schoharie County (2 seats)
- Seneca County (2 seats)
- Steuben County (2 seats)
- Suffolk County (2 seats)
- Sullivan County (1 seat)
- Tioga County (2 seats)
- Tompkins County (3 seats)
- Ulster County (2 seats)
- Warren County (1 seat)
- Washington County (3 seats)
- Wayne County (2 seats)
- Westchester County (3 seats)
- Yates County (1 seat)
Note: There are now 62 counties in the State of New York. The counties which are not mentioned in this list had not yet been established, or sufficiently organized, the area being included in one or more of the abovementioned counties.

=== Assemblymen ===
The asterisk (*) denotes members of the previous legislature who continued as members of this legislature.

The party affiliations follow the vote on state treasurer on February 12, and the participation in the Jacksonian caucus on April 13.

District	Assemblymen	Party	Notes
Albany	Peter Gansevoort	Jacksonian	
Albany	Samuel S. Lush	Nat. Rep.	
Albany	Erastus Williams		
Allegany	Daniel Ashley	Anti-Mason	
Broome	Peter Robinson*	Jacksonian	
Cattaraugus	Stephen Crosby	Anti-Mason	
Cayuga	Ephraim Hammond*	Jacksonian	
Cayuga	Solomon Love	Jacksonian	
Cayuga	William H. Noble*	Jacksonian	
Cayuga	Richard L. Smith	Jacksonian	
Chautauqua	Abner Hazeltine*	Anti-Mason	
Chautauqua	Squire White	Anti-Mason	
Chenango	John Latham		
Chenango	Jarvis K. Pike		
Chenango	Charles Squires		
Clinton	Heman Cady	Jacksonian	
Columbia	Jonathan Lapham	Jacksonian	
Columbia	Aaron Vanderpoel	Jacksonian	
Columbia	Oliver Wiswall	Jacksonian	
Cortland	Chauncey Keep		
Cortland	Henry Stephens		
Delaware	Matthew Halcott	Jacksonian	
Delaware	Erastus Root	Jacksonian	elected Speaker; in November 1830, elected to the 22nd U.S. Congress
Dutchess	James Hughson	Jacksonian	
Dutchess	George P. Oakley	Jacksonian	
Dutchess	Jacob Van Ness	Jacksonian	
Dutchess	Philo M. Winchell	Jacksonian	
Erie	Millard Fillmore*	Anti-Mason	
Erie	Edmund Hull	Anti-Mason	
Essex	William Kirby	Jacksonian	
Franklin	Luther Bradish*	Nat. Rep.	
Genesee	Calvin P. Bailey*		
Genesee	Timothy Fitch	Anti-Mason	
Genesee	Stephen Griswold	Anti-Mason	
Greene	Jonathan Miller	Jacksonian	
Greene	Herman I. Quackenboss	Jacksonian	
Hamilton and Montgomery	Thomas R. Benedict	Jacksonian	
Hamilton and Montgomery	Henry I. Diefendorf	Jacksonian	
Hamilton and Montgomery	Daniel Stewart	Jacksonian	
Herkimer	Frederick P. Bellinger	Jacksonian	
Herkimer	Russel Hopkins	Jacksonian	
Herkimer	Abijah Mann, Jr.*	Jacksonian	from May 28, 1830, also Postmaster of Fairfield
Jefferson	Curtis G. Brooks	Jacksonian	
Jefferson	Aaron Brown	Jacksonian	
Jefferson	Charles Orvis	Jacksonian	
Kings	Coe S. Downing	Jacksonian	
Lewis	Joseph O. Mott*	Jacksonian	
Livingston	Philo C. Fuller*	Anti-Mason	
Livingston	Titus Goodman Jr.*	Anti-Mason	
Madison	William K. Fuller*	Jacksonian	
Madison	William Manchester	Jacksonian	
Madison	John M. Messinger	Jacksonian	
Monroe	Ezra Sheldon Jr.	Anti-Mason	
Monroe	Joseph Randall	Anti-Mason	
Monroe	Thurlow Weed	Anti-Mason	
New York	Jacob S. Bogert*	Jacksonian	
New York	Abraham Cargill*	Jacksonian	
New York	George Curtis	Jacksonian	
New York	Ebenezer Ford	Workingmen	
New York	Charles L. Livingston	Jacksonian	
New York	Dennis McCarthy	Jacksonian	
New York	Gideon Ostrander	Jacksonian	
New York	Silas M. Stilwell	Jacksonian	
New York	Peter S. Titus*	Jacksonian	
New York	Gideon Tucker	Jacksonian	
New York	John Van Beuren*	Jacksonian	
Niagara	Samuel De Veaux	Anti-Mason	
Oneida	Arnon Comstock	Jacksonian	
Oneida	Linus Parker	Jacksonian	
Oneida	Elisha Pettibone	Jacksonian	
Oneida	Eli Savage*	Jacksonian	
Oneida	Ithai Thompson	Jacksonian	
Onondaga	Timothy Brown	Jacksonian	
Onondaga	Thomas J. Gilbert	Jacksonian	
Onondaga	Johnson Hall*	Jacksonian	
Onondaga	Dorastus Lawrence	Jacksonian	
Ontario	John Dickson*	Anti-Mason	
Ontario	Francis Granger	Anti-Mason	
Ontario	Robert C. Nicholas*	Anti-Mason	
Orange	Abraham Cuddeback	Jacksonian	
Orange	Abraham M. Smith	Jacksonian	
Orange	Phineas Tuthill	Jacksonian	
Orleans	John H. Tyler	Anti-Mason	
Oswego	Hiram Hubbell	Jacksonian	
Otsego	William Baker	Jacksonian	
Otsego	Archibald Dixson		
Otsego	Samuel M. Ingalls	Jacksonian	
Otsego	Jesse Ross	Jacksonian	
Putnam	James Towner	Jacksonian	
Queens	Thomas Tredwell	Nat. Rep.	contested by Henry Floyd-Jones (J) who took the seat on January 28
Rensselaer	Abiel Buckman	Jacksonian	
Rensselaer	George R. Davis	Jacksonian	from February 1, 1830, also a Bank Commissioner
Rensselaer	Ziba Hewitt	Jacksonian	
Rensselaer	Abraham C. Lansing	Jacksonian	
Richmond	John T. Harrison	Jacksonian	
Rockland	George S. Allison*	Jacksonian	
St. Lawrence	Jonah Sanford*	Jacksonian	
St. Lawrence	Asa Sprague Jr.	Jacksonian	
Saratoga	Seth Perry	Jacksonian	
Saratoga	William Shepherd	Jacksonian	
Saratoga	Samuel Stewart		
Schenectady	Alonzo C. Paige*	Jacksonian	also Reporter of the New York Court of Chancery
Schoharie	Abraham L. Lawyer	Jacksonian	
Schoharie	Charles Watson	Jacksonian	
Seneca	Samuel Blain	Anti-Mason	
Seneca	Septimus Evans	Anti-Mason	
Steuben	Andrew B. Dickinson	Jacksonian	
Steuben	Josiah Dunlap	Anti-Mason	
Suffolk	Samuel Strong	Jacksonian	
Suffolk	Noah Youngs	Jacksonian	
Sullivan	Herman M. Hardenburgh		
Tioga	John G. McDowell	Jacksonian	
Tioga	Wright Dunham	Jacksonian	
Tompkins	Elijah Atwater	Jacksonian	
Tompkins	Jonathan B. Gosman*	Jacksonian	
Tompkins	Ebenezer Mack	Jacksonian	
Ulster	Green Miller	Jacksonian	
Ulster	Matthew Oliver	Jacksonian	
Warren	Norman Fox	Jacksonian	
Washington	David Abel Russell	Anti-Mason	
Washington	David Sill	Anti-Mason	
Washington	Robert Wilcox	Anti-Mason	
Wayne	Luther Chapin		
Wayne	Seth Eddy		
Westchester	Aaron Brown*	Jacksonian	
Westchester	Lawrence Davenport*	Jacksonian	
Westchester	Abel Smith*	Jacksonian	
Yates	Morris F. Sheppard*	Anti-Mason	

=== Employees ===
- Clerk: Francis Seger
- Sergeant-at-Arms: James D. Scollard
- Doorkeeper: Alonzo Crosby
- Assistant Doorkeeper: Oliver Scovil

== Sources ==
- The New York Civil List compiled by Franklin Benjamin Hough (Weed, Parsons and Co., 1858) [pg. 109 and 441 for Senate districts; pg. 128 for senators; pg. 148f for Assembly districts; pg. 209f for assemblymen]
- The History of Political Parties in the State of New-York, from the Ratification of the Federal Constitution to 1840 by Jabez D. Hammond (4th ed., Vol. 2, Phinney & Co., Buffalo, 1850; pg. 315 to 336)
