= 54th New York State Legislature =

New York state legislative session

←	53rd	55th	→
- The Old State Capitol (1879)

Overview
- Legislative body: New York State Legislature
- Jurisdiction: New York, United States
- Term: January 1 – December 31, 1831

Senate
- Members: 32
- President: Lt. Gov. Edward P. Livingston (J)
- Party control: Jacksonian (24-8)

Assembly
- Members: 128
- Speaker: George R. Davis (J)
- Party control: Jacksonian

Sessions
- 1st: January 4 – April 26, 1831

The 54th New York State Legislature, consisting of the New York State Senate and the New York State Assembly, met from January 4 to April 26, 1831, during the third year of Enos T. Throop's governorship, in Albany.

== Background ==
Under the provisions of the New York Constitution of 1821, 32 senators were elected on general tickets in eight senatorial districts for four-year terms. They were divided into four classes, and every year eight Senate seats came up for election. Assemblymen were elected countywide on general tickets to a one-year term, the whole Assembly being renewed annually.

State Senator Moses Hayden died on February 13, 1830, leaving a vacancy in the Eighth District.

At this time, there were three political parties: the Jacksonians (supporting President Andrew Jackson; led by U.S. Secretary of State Martin Van Buren), the Anti-Masons, and the National Republicans (supporting Henry Clay for the presidency).

The Anti-Masonic state convention met in August 1830 at Utica, and nominated Assemblyman Francis Granger for governor, and Samuel Stevens, of New York City, for lieutenant governor. The National Republicans did not call a convention, and supported the Anti-Masonic ticket.

The Jacksonian state convention met on September 8, 1830, at Herkimer and nominated Gov. Throop for re-election, and Edward P. Livingston for lieutenant governor.

== Elections ==
The State election was held from November 1 to 3, 1830. Gov. Enos T. Throop was re-elected, and Edward P. Livingston was elected lieutenant governor.

State Senator Jonathan S. Conklin (1st D.) was re-elected. David M. Westcott (2nd D.), William I. Dodge (4th D.), Henry A. Foster (5th D.), Charles W. Lynde (6th D.), William H. Seward (7th D.), Trumbull Cary (8th D.); and Assemblymen Herman I. Quackenboss (3rd D.) and Philo C. Fuller (8th D.) were also elected to the Senate. Lynde, Seward, Cary and Fuller were Anti-Masons, the other five were Jacksonians.

== Sessions ==
The Legislature met for the regular session at the Old State Capitol in Albany on January 4, 1831; and adjourned on April 26.

George R. Davis (J) was elected Speaker with 91 votes against 30 for John C. Spencer (A-M).

On January 6, Cary and Fuller drew lots to decide which one of the two senators elected in the 8th District would serve the short term, and which one the full term. Fuller drew the short term, and Cary the full term.

On February 1, the Legislature elected Supreme Court Justice William L. Marcy (J) to succeed Nathan Sanford as U.S. Senator for a six-year term beginning on March 4, 1831.

On February 1, the Legislature re-elected State Treasurer Abraham Keyser, Jr.

On June 3, a National Republican state convention met at Albany, Peter R. Livingston was Chairman. The convention chose delegates to the National Republican national convention which would nominate Henry Clay for U.S. president, among them Stephen Van Rensselaer and Ambrose Spencer.

== State Senate ==
=== Districts ===
- The First District (4 seats) consisted of Kings, New York, Queens, Richmond and Suffolk counties.
- The Second District (4 seats) consisted of Delaware, Dutchess, Orange, Putnam, Rockland, Sullivan, Ulster and Westchester counties.
- The Third District (4 seats) consisted of Albany, Columbia, Greene, Rensselaer, Schenectady and Schoharie counties.
- The Fourth District (4 seats) consisted of Clinton, Essex, Franklin, Hamilton, Montgomery, St. Lawrence, Saratoga, Warren and Washington counties.
- The Fifth District (4 seats) consisted of Herkimer, Jefferson, Lewis, Madison, Oneida and Oswego counties.
- The Sixth District (4 seats) consisted of Broome, Chenango, Cortland, Otsego, Steuben, Tioga and Tompkins counties.
- The Seventh District (4 seats) consisted of Cayuga, Onondaga, Ontario, Seneca, Wayne and Yates counties.
- The Eighth District (4 seats) consisted of Allegany, Cattaraugus, Chautauqua, Erie, Genesee, Livingston, Monroe, Niagara and Orleans counties.
Note: There are now 62 counties in the State of New York. The counties which are not mentioned in this list had not yet been established, or sufficiently organized, the area being included in one or more of the abovementioned counties.

=== Members ===
The asterisk (*) denotes members of the previous Legislature who continued in office as members of this Legislature. Herman I. Quackenboss and Philo C. Fuller changed from the Assembly to the Senate.

District	Senators	Term left	Party	Notes
First	John I. Schenck*	1 year	Jacksonian	
First	Stephen Allen*	2 years	Jacksonian	
First	Alpheus Sherman*	3 years	Jacksonian	
First	Jonathan S. Conklin*	4 years	Jacksonian	
Second	Walker Todd*	1 year	Jacksonian	also Postmaster of Carmel
Second	Samuel Rexford*	2 years	Jacksonian	
Second	Nathaniel P. Tallmadge*	3 years	Jacksonian	
Second	David M. Westcott	4 years	Jacksonian	
Third	Moses Warren*	1 year	Jacksonian	
Third	Lewis Eaton*	2 years	Jacksonian	
Third	William Dietz*	3 years	Jacksonian	
Third	Herman I. Quackenboss*	4 years	Jacksonian	
Fourth	Reuben Sanford*	1 year	Jacksonian	also Postmaster of Wilmington
Fourth	John McLean Jr.*	2 years	Jacksonian	
Fourth	Isaac Gere*	3 years	Jacksonian	
Fourth	William I. Dodge	4 years	Jacksonian	
Fifth	Nathaniel S. Benton*	1 year	Jacksonian	resigned on April 13, 1831, to take office as U.S. Attorney for the Northern District of New York
Fifth	William H. Maynard*	2 years	Anti-Mason	
Fifth	Alvin Bronson*	3 years	Jacksonian	
Fifth	Henry A. Foster	4 years	Jacksonian	
Sixth	Grattan H. Wheeler*	1 year	Jacksonian	in November 1830, elected to the 22nd U.S. Congress, and resigned his seat in the State Senate on March 3, 1831
Sixth	John F. Hubbard*	2 years	Jacksonian	
Sixth	Levi Beardsley*	3 years	Jacksonian	
Sixth	Charles W. Lynde	4 years	Anti-Mason	
Seventh	George B. Throop*	1 year	Jacksonian	
Seventh	Hiram F. Mather*	2 years	Anti-Mason	
Seventh	Thomas Armstrong*	3 years	Jacksonian	also Supervisor of Butler, and Chairman of the Board of Supervisors of Wayne Co.
Seventh	William H. Seward	4 years	Anti-Mason	
Eighth	Timothy H. Porter*	1 year	Anti-Mason	
Eighth	Philo C. Fuller*	2 years	Anti-Mason	elected to fill vacancy, in place of Moses Hayden
Eighth	Albert H. Tracy*	3 years	Anti-Mason	
Eighth	Trumbull Cary	4 years	Anti-Mason	

=== Employees ===
- Clerk: John F. Bacon

== State Assembly ==
=== Districts ===
- Albany County (3 seats)
- Allegany County (1 seat)
- Broome County (1 seat)
- Cattaraugus County (1 seat)
- Cayuga County (4 seats)
- Chautauqua County (2 seats)
- Chenango County (3 seats)
- Clinton County (1 seat)
- Columbia County (3 seats)
- Cortland County (2 seats)
- Delaware County (2 seats)
- Dutchess County (4 seats)
- Erie County (2 seats)
- Essex County (1 seat)
- Franklin County (1 seat)
- Genesee County (3 seats)
- Greene County (2 seats)
- Hamilton and Montgomery counties (3 seats)
- Herkimer County (3 seats)
- Jefferson County (3 seats)
- Kings County (1 seat)
- Lewis County (1 seat)
- Livingston County (2 seats)
- Madison County (3 seats)
- Monroe County (3 seats)
- The City and County of New York (11 seats)
- Niagara County (1 seat)
- Oneida County (5 seats)
- Onondaga County (4 seats)
- Ontario County (3 seats)
- Orange County (3 seats)
- Orleans County (1 seat)
- Oswego County (1 seat)
- Otsego County (4 seats)
- Putnam County (1 seat)
- Queens County (1 seat)
- Rensselaer County (4 seats)
- Richmond County (1 seat)
- Rockland County (1 seat)
- St. Lawrence County (2 seats)
- Saratoga County (3 seats)
- Schenectady County (1 seat)
- Schoharie County (2 seats)
- Seneca County (2 seats)
- Steuben County (2 seats)
- Suffolk County (2 seats)
- Sullivan County (1 seat)
- Tioga County (2 seats)
- Tompkins County (3 seats)
- Ulster County (2 seats)
- Warren County (1 seat)
- Washington (3 seats)
- Wayne County (2 seats)
- Westchester County (3 seats)
- Yates County (1 seat)
Note: There are now 62 counties in the State of New York. The counties which are not mentioned in this list had not yet been established, or sufficiently organized, the area being included in one or more of the abovementioned counties.

=== Assemblymen ===
The asterisk (*) denotes members of the previous Legislature who continued as members of this Legislature.

The party affiliations follow the vote for U.S. Senator and state treasurer.

District	Assemblymen	Party	Notes
Albany	Peter Gansevoort*	Jacksonian	
Albany	Wheeler Watson	Jacksonian	
Albany	Peter W. Winne	Jacksonian	
Allegany	Daniel Ashley*	Anti-Mason	
Broome	Peter Robinson*	Jacksonian	
Cattaraugus	Russell Hubbard	Anti-Mason	
Cayuga	Solomon Love*	Jacksonian	
Cayuga	Elias Manchester	Anti-Mason	
Cayuga	George S. Tilford	Jacksonian	
Cayuga	Peter Yawger	Jacksonian	
Chautauqua	John Birdsall	Anti-Mason	
Chautauqua	Squire White*	Anti-Mason	
Chenango	Joseph Juliand	Anti-Mason	
Chenango	Jarvis K. Pike*		
Chenango	Ira Willcox	Anti-Mason	
Clinton	John Walker	Jacksonian	
Columbia	John W. Edmonds	Jacksonian	
Columbia	John S. Harris	Jacksonian	
Columbia	Pliny Hudson		
Cortland	Fredus Howard	Jacksonian	
Cortland	Charles Richardson	Jacksonian	
Delaware	David P. Mapes	Jacksonian	
Delaware	Peter Pine	Jacksonian	
Dutchess	Joel Benton	Jacksonian	
Dutchess	Samuel B. Halsey	Jacksonian	
Dutchess	William Hooker	Jacksonian	
Dutchess	John E. Townsend	Jacksonian	
Erie	Millard Fillmore*	Anti-Mason	
Erie	Nathaniel Knight		
Essex	Joseph S. Weed	Jacksonian	
Franklin	James B. Spencer	Jacksonian	
Genesee	Robert Earll Jr.	Anti-Mason	
Genesee	Stephen Griswold*	Anti-Mason	
Genesee	Charles Woodworth	Anti-Mason	
Greene	Lewis Benton	Jacksonian	
Greene	John I. Brandow	Jacksonian	
Hamilton and Montgomery	Josiah O. Brown	Jacksonian	
Hamilton and Montgomery	Platt Potter	Jacksonian	
Hamilton and Montgomery	William Rob	Jacksonian	
Herkimer	Atwater Cooke Jr.	Jacksonian	
Herkimer	Olmsted Hough	Jacksonian	
Herkimer	Nicholas Lawyer	Jacksonian	
Jefferson	Joseph C. Budd	Jacksonian	
Jefferson	Walter Cole	Jacksonian	
Jefferson	Fleury Keith	Jacksonian	
Kings	Coe S. Downing*	Jacksonian	
Lewis	Harrison Blodget	Jacksonian	
Livingston	Jerediah Horsford	Anti-Mason	
Livingston	James Percival	Anti-Mason	
Madison	Robert Henry	Jacksonian	
Madison	Stephen B. Hoffman	Jacksonian	
Madison	John Whitman	Jacksonian	
Monroe	Samuel G. Andrews	Anti-Mason	
Monroe	Isaac Lacey	Anti-Mason	
Monroe	Peter Price	Anti-Mason	
New York	Jacob S. Bogert*	Jacksonian	
New York	Abraham Cargill*	Jacksonian	
New York	Nathaniel Jarvis	Jacksonian	
New York	Charles L. Livingston*	Jacksonian	
New York	Dennis McCarthy*	Jacksonian	
New York	James Morgan	Jacksonian	
New York	Mordecai Myers	Jacksonian	
New York	Gideon Ostrander*	Jacksonian	
New York	Dudley Selden	Jacksonian	
New York	Silas M. Stilwell*	Jacksonian	
New York	Isaac L. Varian	Jacksonian	
Niagara	Henry Norton	Anti-Mason	
Oneida	Reuben Bettis	Jacksonian	
Oneida	Arnon Comstock*	Jacksonian	
Oneida	David Moulton	Jacksonian	
Oneida	Riley Shepard	Jacksonian	
Oneida	John F. Trowbridge	Jacksonian	
Onondaga	Otis Bigelow	Jacksonian	
Onondaga	Thomas J. Gilbert*	Jacksonian	
Onondaga	Elisha Litchfield	Jacksonian	
Onondaga	Jared H. Parker		
Ontario	Thomas Ottley	Anti-Mason	
Ontario	Samuel Rawson	Anti-Mason	
Ontario	John C. Spencer	Anti-Mason	
Orange	Edward Blake	Jacksonian	
Orange	Robert Fowler	Jacksonian	
Orange	James Hulse	Jacksonian	
Orleans	John H. Tyler*	Anti-Mason	
Oswego	Joel Turrill	Jacksonian	also First Judge of the Oswego County Court
Otsego	Henry Clark		
Otsego	Peter Collier		
Otsego	Schuyler Crippen	Jacksonian	
Otsego	Eben B. Morehouse	Jacksonian	
Putnam	Bennet Boyd		
Queens	Thomas Tredwell	Nat. Rep.	
Rensselaer	George R. Davis*	Jacksonian	elected Speaker; also a Bank Commissioner
Rensselaer	Chester Griswold	Jacksonian	
Rensselaer	Martin Springer	Jacksonian	
Rensselaer	Aaron Worthington	Jacksonian	
Richmond	John T. Harrison*	Jacksonian	
Rockland	John J. Eckerson	Jacksonian	
St. Lawrence	Joseph Freeman	Jacksonian	
St. Lawrence	Asa Sprague Jr.*	Jacksonian	
Saratoga	Howell Gardner	Jacksonian	
Saratoga	John Gilchrist	Jacksonian	
Saratoga	Oran G. Otis	Jacksonian	
Schenectady	Aaron Carroll	Jacksonian	
Schoharie	Robert Eldredge	Jacksonian	
Schoharie	Daniel Hager Jr.	Jacksonian	
Seneca	John Sayre	Anti-Mason	
Seneca	Benjamin Woodruff	Anti-Mason	
Steuben	Paul C. Cook		
Steuben	Josiah Dunlap*	Anti-Mason	
Suffolk	George L. Conklin	Jacksonian	
Suffolk	George S. Phillips	Jacksonian	
Sullivan	James C. Curtis	Jacksonian	also Supervisor of Cochecton
Tioga	John G. McDowell*	Jacksonian	
Tioga	David Williams	Jacksonian	
Tompkins	John Ellis		
Tompkins	Jehiel Ludlow	Anti-Mason	
Tompkins	John Sayler	Anti-Mason	
Ulster	Jacob J. Schoonmaker		
Ulster	John Van Buren	Jacksonian	
Warren	Samuel Stackhouse	Jacksonian	
Washington	George W. Jermain	Jacksonian	
Washington	Henry Thorn	Jacksonian	
Washington	William Townsend	Jacksonian	
Wayne	Seth Eddy*	Anti-Mason	
Wayne	Ananias Wells	Anti-Mason	
Westchester	St. John Constant	Jacksonian	
Westchester	Thomas Murphy	Jacksonian	
Westchester	Aaron Vark	Jacksonian	also Postmaster of Yonkers
Yates	Aaron Remer	Jacksonian	

=== Employees ===
- Clerk: Francis Seger
- Sergeant-at-Arms: Pomeroy Jones
- Doorkeeper: Alonzo Crosby
- Assistant Doorkeeper: Oliver Scovil

== Sources ==
- The New York Civil List compiled by Franklin Benjamin Hough (Weed, Parsons and Co., 1858) [pg. 109 and 441 for Senate districts; pg. 128f for senators; pg. 148f for Assembly districts; pg. 210f for assemblymen]
- The History of Political Parties in the State of New-York, from the Ratification of the Federal Constitution to 1840 by Jabez D. Hammond (4th ed., Vol. 2, Phinney & Co., Buffalo, 1850; pg. 336 to 368)
