= 52nd New York State Legislature =

New York state legislative session

←	51st	53rd	→
- The Old State Capitol (1879)

Overview
- Legislative body: New York State Legislature
- Jurisdiction: New York, United States
- Term: January 1 – December 31, 1829

Senate
- Members: 32
- President: Lt. Gov. Enos T. Throop (J), until March 12
- Temporary President: Charles Stebbins (J), from March 12
- Party control: Jacksonian

Assembly
- Members: 128
- Speaker: Peter Robinson (J)
- Party control: Jacksonian

Sessions
- 1st: January 6 – May 5, 1829

The 52nd New York State Legislature, consisting of the New York State Senate and the New York State Assembly, met from January 6 to May 5, 1829, during the short tenure of Martin Van Buren as Governor of New York, and—after Van Buren's resignation—during the first year of Enos T. Throop's governorship, in Albany.

== Background ==
Under the provisions of the New York Constitution of 1821, 32 Senators were elected on general tickets in eight senatorial districts for four-year terms. They were divided into four classes, and every year eight Senate seats came up for election. Assemblymen were elected countywide on general tickets to a one-year term, the whole Assembly being renewed annually.

On January 31, 1828, a caucus of Jacksonian legislators nominated Andrew Jackson for U.S. president.

State Senator Charles H. Carroll resigned in March 1828, leaving a vacancy in the Eighth District.

On June 10, 1828, a state convention of Adams men met at Albany, and nominated U.S. President John Quincy Adams for re-election.

On July 22, a state convention of Adams men met at Utica; James Fairlie was Chairman; and Tilly Lynde and Thomas Clowes were Secretaries. They nominated U.S. Supreme Court Justice Smith Thompson for governor, and Assemblyman Francis Granger for lieutenant governor.

The Anti-Masonic state convention nominated Assemblyman Francis Granger for governor, and State Senator John Crary for lieutenant governor. Granger declined to run for this office on this ticket, and expected Crary to decline too, so that he, Granger, could be endorsed by the Anti-Masons for lieutenant governor. Crary, however, did not decline and ran on the Anti-Masonic ticket with Solomon Southwick for governor.

The Jacksonian state convention met at Herkimer and nominated U.S. Senator Martin Van Buren for governor and Circuit Judge Enos T. Throop for lieutenant governor.

At the time of the election in November 1828, there were three political parties: the "Jacksonians" (supporting the election of Andrew Jackson for U.S. president; led by U.S. Senator Martin Van Buren), the "Adams men" (supporters of the re-election of President John Quincy Adams), and the "Anti-Masons". After the defeat of Adams, the Adams men became known as "Anti-Jacksonians".

== Elections ==
The State election was held from November 3 to 5, 1828. Martin Van Buren and Enos T. Throop were elected governor and lieutenant governor. 18 presidential electors for Andrew Jackson, and 16 for John Quincy Adams were elected in the congressional districts; and they co-opted another 2 Jacksonian electors-at-large.

Stephen Allen (1st D.), Samuel Rexford (2nd D.), Lewis Eaton (3rd D.), John McLean Jr. (4th D.), William H. Maynard (5th D.), John F. Hubbard (6th D.), Hiram F. Mather (7th D.) and Moses Hayden (8th D.) were elected to full terms in the Senate. George H. Boughton (8th D.) was elected to fill the vacancy. McLean was an Adams man; Maynard, Mather, Boughton and Hayden were Anti-Masons; the other four were Jacksonians.

== Sessions ==
The Legislature met for the regular session at the Old State Capitol in Albany on January 6, 1829; and adjourned on May 5.

Peter Robinson (J) was elected Speaker.

On January 15, the Legislature elected Charles E. Dudley (J) to the seat in the U.S. Senate vacated by Martin Van Buren after his election as governor.

On January 27, the Legislature re-elected Secretary of State Azariah C. Flagg, Surveyor General Simeon De Witt, and State Treasurer Abraham Keyser, Jr.; and elected Congressman Silas Wright, Jr. to succeed William L. Marcy as State Comptroller; and Greene C. Bronson to succeed Samuel A. Talcott as attorney general.

On March 12, Gov. Martin Van Buren resigned to take office as U.S. Secretary of State, Lt. Gov. Enos T. Throop succeeded to the governorship, and Charles Stebbins (J) was elected Temporary President of the State Senate.

On April 2, the Legislature enacted the Bank Safety Fund Law which, among other things, created the office of Bank Commissioner.

On April 15, the Legislature enacted that henceforth the presidential electors should be elected statewide by general ticket, instead of in single districts.

== State Senate ==
=== Districts ===
- The First District (4 seats) consisted of Kings, New York, Queens, Richmond and Suffolk counties.
- The Second District (4 seats) consisted of Delaware, Dutchess, Orange, Putnam, Rockland, Sullivan, Ulster and Westchester counties.
- The Third District (4 seats) consisted of Albany, Columbia, Greene, Rensselaer, Schenectady and Schoharie counties.
- The Fourth District (4 seats) consisted of Clinton, Essex, Franklin, Hamilton, Montgomery, St. Lawrence, Saratoga, Warren and Washington counties.
- The Fifth District (4 seats) consisted of Herkimer, Jefferson, Lewis, Madison, Oneida and Oswego counties.
- The Sixth District (4 seats) consisted of Broome, Chenango, Cortland, Otsego, Steuben, Tioga and Tompkins counties.
- The Seventh District (4 seats) consisted of Cayuga, Onondaga, Ontario, Seneca, Wayne and Yates counties.
- The Eighth District (4 seats) consisted of Allegany, Cattaraugus, Chautauqua, Erie, Genesee, Livingston, Monroe, Niagara and Orleans counties.
Note: There are now 62 counties in the State of New York. The counties which are not mentioned in this list had not yet been established, or sufficiently organized, the area being included in one or more of the abovementioned counties.

=== Members ===
The asterisk (*) denotes members of the previous Legislature who continued in office as members of this Legislature.

District	Senators	Term left	Party	Notes
First	Joshua Smith*	1 year		
First	Robert Bogardus*	2 years	Jacksonian	resigned on May 4, 1829
First	John I. Schenck*	3 years	Jacksonian	
First	Stephen Allen	4 years	Jacksonian	
Second	Peter R. Livingston*	1 year	Jacksonian	
Second	Benjamin Woodward*	2 years		also Postmaster of Mount Hope
Second	Walker Todd*	3 years	Jacksonian	also Postmaster of Carmel
Second	Samuel Rexford	4 years	Jacksonian	
Third	Ambrose L. Jordan*	1 year	Adams man	resigned on January 7, 1829
Third	John McCarty*	2 years	Jacksonian	
Third	Moses Warren*	3 years	Jacksonian	
Third	Lewis Eaton	4 years	Jacksonian	
Fourth	John L. Viele*	1 year		
Fourth	Duncan McMartin Jr.*	2 years	Adams man	
Fourth	Reuben Sanford*	3 years	Adams man	
Fourth	John McLean Jr.	4 years	Adams man	
Fifth	Charles Stebbins*	1 year	Jacksonian	elected President pro tempore
Fifth	Truman Enos*	2 years	Jacksonian	
Fifth	Nathaniel S. Benton*	3 years	Jacksonian	
Fifth	William H. Maynard	4 years	Anti-Mason	
Sixth	Peter Hager 2d*	1 year		
Sixth	Thomas G. Waterman*	2 years		
Sixth	Grattan H. Wheeler*	3 years	Adams man	
Sixth	John F. Hubbard	4 years	Jacksonian	
Seventh	Truman Hart*	1 year		
Seventh	William M. Oliver*	2 years	Jacksonian	
Seventh	George B. Throop*	3 years	Jacksonian	
Seventh	Hiram F. Mather	4 years	Anti-Mason	
Eighth	Ethan B. Allen*	1 year		
Eighth	George H. Boughton	2 years	Anti-Mason	elected to fill vacancy, in place of Charles H. Carroll
Eighth	Timothy H. Porter*	3 years	Adams man	
Eighth	Moses Hayden	4 years	Anti-Mason	

=== Employees ===
- Clerk: John F. Bacon

== State Assembly ==
=== Districts ===
- Albany County (3 seats)
- Allegany County (1 seat)
- Broome County (1 seat)
- Cattaraugus County (1 seat)
- Cayuga County (4 seats)
- Chautauqua County (2 seats)
- Chenango County (3 seats)
- Clinton County (1 seat)
- Columbia County (3 seats)
- Cortland County (2 seats)
- Delaware County (2 seats)
- Dutchess County (4 seats)
- Erie County (2 seats)
- Essex County (1 seat)
- Franklin County (1 seat)
- Genesee County (3 seats)
- Greene County (2 seats)
- Hamilton and Montgomery counties (3 seats)
- Herkimer County (3 seats)
- Jefferson County (3 seats)
- Kings County (1 seat)
- Lewis County (1 seat)
- Livingston County (2 seats)
- Madison County (3 seats)
- Monroe County (3 seats)
- The City and County of New York (11 seats)
- Niagara County (1 seat)
- Oneida County (5 seats)
- Onondaga County (4 seats)
- Ontario County (3 seats)
- Orange County (3 seats)
- Orleans County (1 seat)
- Oswego County (1 seat)
- Otsego County (4 seats)
- Putnam County (1 seat)
- Queens County (1 seat)
- Rensselaer County (4 seats)
- Richmond County (1 seat)
- Rockland County (1 seat)
- St. Lawrence County (2 seats)
- Saratoga County (3 seats)
- Schenectady County (1 seat)
- Schoharie County (2 seats)
- Seneca County (2 seats)
- Steuben County (2 seats)
- Suffolk County (2 seats)
- Sullivan County (1 seat)
- Tioga County (2 seats)
- Tompkins County (3 seats)
- Ulster County (2 seats)
- Warren County (1 seat)
- Washington (3 seats)
- Wayne County (2 seats)
- Westchester County (3 seats)
- Yates County (1 seat)
Note: There are now 62 counties in the State of New York. The counties which are not mentioned in this list had not yet been established, or sufficiently organized, the area being included in one or more of the abovementioned counties.

=== Assemblymen ===
The asterisk (*) denotes members of the previous Legislature who continued as members of this Legislature.

District	Assemblymen	Party	Notes
Albany	James D. Gardner		
Albany	Moses Stanton		
Albany	Chandler Starr	Adams man	
Allegany	Azel Fitch*		
Broome	Peter Robinson*	Jacksonian	elected Speaker
Cattaraugus	Flavel Partridge		
Cayuga	Henry R. Brinckerhoff*		
Cayuga	Ephraim Hammond	Jacksonian	
Cayuga	William H. Noble*	Jacksonian	
Cayuga	Wing Taber		
Chautauqua	Abner Hazeltine	Anti-Mason	
Chautauqua	Nathan Mixer*		
Chenango	Russel Case		
Chenango	Abel Chandler		
Chenango	Amos A. Franklin		
Clinton	Bela Edgerton*		
Columbia	Abraham P. Holdridge		
Columbia	Henry W. Livingston		
Columbia	Peter Van Beuren		
Cortland	Alanson Carley		
Cortland	Gideon Curtiss		
Delaware	William S. McCrea		
Delaware	James G. Redfield		
Dutchess	Elijah Baker Jr.		
Dutchess	Stoddard Judd	Jacksonian	
Dutchess	Stephen D. Van Wyck		
Dutchess	vacant?		
Erie	David Burt*		
Erie	Millard Fillmore	Anti-Mason	
Essex	Ezra C. Gross*	Adams man	died on April 9, 1829
Franklin	Luther Bradish*	Adams man	
Genesee	Calvin P. Bailey		
Genesee	John Hascall		
Genesee	John B. Skinner*	J./A.-M.	
Greene	Moses Austin		
Greene	Castle Seeley		
Hamilton and Montgomery	Phineas Randall		
Hamilton and Montgomery	Joseph Spier		
Hamilton and Montgomery	Peter Young		
Herkimer	John B. Dygert		
Herkimer	Abijah Mann, Jr.*	Jacksonian	
Herkimer	Cornelius Sloughter		
Jefferson	Jere Carrier		
Jefferson	Titus Ives		
Jefferson	Fleury Keith		
Kings	John Wyckoff		
Lewis	George D. Ruggles*		
Livingston	Philo C. Fuller	Anti-Mason	
Livingston	Titus Goodman Jr.		
Madison	James B. Eldredge		
Madison	William K. Fuller	Jacksonian	
Madison	John Williams		
Monroe	John Garbutt		
Monroe	Heman Norton		
Monroe	Reuben Willey		
New York	William Alburtis*	Jacksonian	
New York	Nathan T. Arnold		
New York	Jacob S. Bogert	Jacksonian	
New York	Abraham Cargill*	Jacksonian	
New York	Aaron O. Dayton		
New York	Jacob G. Dyckman		
New York	Charles L. Livingston	Jacksonian	
New York	Mordecai Myers		
New York	Thomas L. Smith		
New York	Peter S. Titus	Jacksonian	
New York	John Van Beuren	Jacksonian	
Niagara	John Garnsey*		
Oneida	Reuben Bacon		
Oneida	Benjamin P. Johnson*		
Oneida	Eli Savage*	Jacksonian	
Oneida	Reuben Tower		
Oneida	Fortune C. White		
Onondaga	Johnson Hall	Jacksonian	
Onondaga	Herman Jenkins		
Onondaga	Samuel B. Mathews		
Onondaga	Lewis Smith		
Ontario	John Dickson	Anti-Mason	
Ontario	Mathew Hubbell		
Ontario	Robert C. Nicholas*	Anti-Mason	
Orange	Robert Fowler		
Orange	Richard Graham		
Orange	James Waugh		
Orleans	George W. Fleming		
Oswego	George H. Falley		
Otsego	Peter Collier		
Otsego	William Hall		
Otsego	Seth Hubbard Jr.		
Otsego	George Morell		
Putnam	Thomas W. Tailor		
Queens	Henry Floyd-Jones	Jacksonian	
Rensselaer	Nathaniel Barnett Jr.		
Rensselaer	Martin Defreest		
Rensselaer	William P. Heermans		
Rensselaer	Henry Mallary		
Richmond	John Vanderbilt		
Rockland	George S. Allison	Jacksonian	
St. Lawrence	Jonah Sanford	Jacksonian	
St. Lawrence	Harvey D. Smith		
Saratoga	Joshua Mandeville		
Saratoga	Gilbert Waring		
Saratoga	Calvin Wheeler		unsuccessfully contested by Harvey Granger
Schenectady	Alonzo C. Paige*	Jacksonian	also Reporter of the New York Court of Chancery
Schoharie	Valentine Efner	Jacksonian	
Schoharie	Peter Hynds		
Seneca	Septimus Evans		contested by Daniel W. Bostwick who was seated on January 29
Seneca	Daniel Scott		
Steuben	Randall Graves		
Steuben	Henry Phoenix		
Suffolk	David Hedges Jr.		
Suffolk	John M. Williamson		
Sullivan	John Lindsley		
Tioga	Caleb Baker		
Tioga	Samuel Barager		
Tompkins	Amasa Dana*	Jacksonian	also D.A. of Tompkins Co.
Tompkins	Samuel H. Dean*		
Tompkins	Jonathan B. Gosman	Jacksonian	
Ulster	Lodewyck Hornbeck		
Ulster	Abraham D. Soper		
Warren	William McDonald		
Washington	John McDonald		
Washington	Robert McNeil		
Washington	Richard Sill		
Wayne	Thomas Armstrong*	Jacksonian	also Supervisor of Butler, and Chairman of the Board of Supervisors of Wayne Co.
Wayne	Jonathan Boynton		
Westchester	Aaron Brown	Jacksonian	
Westchester	Lawrence Davenport	Jacksonian	
Westchester	Abel Smith	Jacksonian	
Yates	Morris F. Sheppard*		

=== Employees ===
- Clerk: Francis Seger
- Sergeant-at-Arms: John C. Ellis
- Doorkeeper: James D. Scollard
- Assistant Doorkeeper: Alonzo Crosby

== Sources ==
- The New York Civil List compiled by Franklin Benjamin Hough (Weed, Parsons and Co., 1858) [see pg. 38f for Safety Fund and bank commissioners; pg. 109 and 441 for Senate districts; pg. 127f for senators; pg. 148f for Assembly districts; pg. 207ff for assemblymen; 322 and 327 for presidential election]
- The History of Political Parties in the State of New-York, from the Ratification of the Federal Constitution to 1840 by Jabez D. Hammond (4th ed., Vol. 2, Phinney & Co., Buffalo, 1850; pg. 288 to 315)
