= 1831 United States Senate election in New York =

The 1831 United States Senate election in New York was held on February 1, 1831, by the New York State Legislature to elect a U.S. senator (Class 3) to represent the State of New York in the United States Senate.

== Background ==
Nathan Sanford had been elected in 1826 to this seat, and his term would expire on March 3, 1831.

At the State election in November 1830, the Jacksonian Democrats managed to defeat the combined Anti-Masons and National Republicans. Enos T. Throop was narrowly re-elected Governor, a large Jacksonian-Democratic majority was elected to the assembly, and five of the nine state senators elected were Jacksonian Democrats. The 54th New York State Legislature met from January 4 to April 26, 1831, at Albany, New York. The party strength in the assembly as shown by the election for Speaker was: 91 for Jacksonian Democrat George R. Davis and 30 for Anti-Mason John C. Spencer.

== Candidates ==
The Jacksonian Democratic State legislators held a caucus before the election, and nominated New York Supreme Court Justice William L. Marcy. The vote was 77 for Marcy, 15 for Erastus Root, 6 for the incumbent Nathan Sanford and 6 scattering votes.

== Result ==
William L. Marcy was the choice of both the Assembly and the Senate, and was declared elected.

1831 United States Senator election result
Office	House	Jacksonian Democrat		Anti-Mason		National Republican	
U.S. Senator	State Senate (32 members)	William L. Marcy	20	Samuel Works	5		
	State Assembly (128 members)	William L. Marcy	86	Samuel Works	27	Nathan Sanford	1

== Aftermath ==
Marcy resigned his seat on January 1, 1833, upon taking office as Governor of New York. The State Legislature held a special election to fill the vacancy in January 1833, and elected Silas Wright, Jr.

== Sources ==
- The New York Civil List compiled in 1858 (see: pg. 63 for U.S. Senators; pg. 128f for state senators 1831; pg. 210f for Members of Assembly 1831)
- Members of the 22nd United States Congress
- History of Political Parties in the State of New-York, Vol. II by Jabez Delano Hammond (State election, 1830: pg. 336ff; Speaker election, 1831: pg. 343; U.S. Senate election, 1831: pg. 346f)
- Niles' Register (February 12, 1831; page 427)
- Journal of the Assembly, 54th Session (pg. 178f)
- Journal of the State Senate, 54th Session (pg. 90)
