= 51st New York State Legislature =

New York state legislative session

←	50th	52nd	→
- The Old State Capitol (1879)

Overview
- Legislative body: New York State Legislature
- Jurisdiction: New York, United States
- Term: January 1 – December 31, 1828

Senate
- Members: 32
- President: Lt. Gov. Nathaniel Pitcher (J), until February 11
- Temporary President: Peter R. Livingston (J), from February 11 to October 7; Charles Dayan (J), from October 7
- Party control: Jacksonian

Assembly
- Members: 128
- Speaker: Erastus Root (J)
- Party control: Jacksonian

Sessions
- 1st: January 1 – April 21, 1828
- 2nd: September 9 – December 10, 1828

The 51st New York State Legislature, consisting of the New York State Senate and the New York State Assembly, met from January 1 to December 10, 1828, during the fourth year of DeWitt Clinton's second tenure as Governor of New York, and—after Clinton's death—while Nathaniel Pitcher was Governor, in Albany.

== Background ==
Under the provisions of the New York Constitution of 1821, 32 Senators were elected on general tickets in eight senatorial districts for four-year terms. They were divided into four classes, and every year eight Senate seats came up for election. Assemblymen were elected countywide on general tickets to a one-year term, the whole Assembly being renewed annually.

State Senator Cadwallader D. Colden resigned on August 30, 1827, leaving a vacancy in the First District.

Before the time of the election in November 1827, the Democratic-Republican Party was split into two factions: the "Bucktails" (led by U.S. Senator Martin Van Buren) and the "Clintonians" (supporters of Gov. DeWitt Clinton). In view of the 1828 United States presidential election, the parties re-aligned: most of the Bucktails became "Jacksonians" (supporters of Andrew Jackson for U.S. president); and most of the Clintonians became "Adams men" (supporters of the re-election of John Quincy Adams).

On September 11, 1826, began the affair surrounding the abduction, and probable murder, of William Morgan which led to the foundation of the Anti-Masonic Party in 1828.

== Elections ==
The State election was held from November 5 to 7, 1827. John I. Schenck (1st D.), Walker Todd (2nd D.), Moses Warren (3rd D.), Reuben Sanford (4th D.), Nathaniel S. Benton (5th D.), Grattan H. Wheeler (6th D.), George B. Throop (7th D.) and Timothy H. Porter (8th D.) were elected to full terms in the Senate. Jacob Tyson (1st D.) was elected to fill the vacancy.

== Sessions ==
The Legislature met for the regular session at the Old State Capitol in Albany on January 2, 1828, and adjourned on April 21.

Erastus Root (Jacksonian) was re-elected Speaker unopposed.

On January 5, Lt. Gov. Pitcher informed the State Senate that he was too ill to attend the session, and Peter R. Livingston (J) was elected Temporary President of the State Senate.

On January 31, a caucus of Jacksonian legislators nominated Andrew Jackson for U.S. president.

On February 11, Gov. DeWitt Clinton died—the only governor in New York history to die in office—and Lt. Gov. Pitcher became governor for the remainder of the year.

The Legislature appointed Daniel Moseley as Special Prosecutor to detect and punish the murderers of William Morgan.

The Legislature created the Superior Court of Common Pleas of New York City. Chancellor Samuel Jones was appointed Chief Justice; and Josiah Ogden Hoffman and Congressman Thomas J. Oakley associate justices.

On June 10, a state convention of Adams men met at Albany, and nominated U.S. President John Quincy Adams for re-election.

On July 22, a state convention of Adams men met at Utica; James Fairlie was chairman; and Tilly Lynde and Thomas Clowes were Secretaries. They nominated U.S. Supreme Court Justice Smith Thompson for Governor, and Assemblyman Francis Granger for Lieutenant Governor.

The Anti-Masonic state convention nominated Assemblyman Francis Granger for Governor, and State Senator John Crary for Lieutenant Governor. Granger declined to run for this office on this ticket, and expected Crary to decline too, so that he, Granger, could be endorsed by the Anti-Masons for Lieutenant Governor. Crary, however, did not decline and ran on the Anti-Masonic ticket with Solomon Southwick for Governor.

The Jacksonian state convention met at Herkimer and nominated U.S. Senator Martin Van Buren for Governor and Circuit Judge Enos T. Throop for Lieutenant Governor.

The Legislature met for a special session on September 9; and adjourned on December 10. At this session the debate on the report of the Board of Revisers of the State Statutes continued.

On October 7, Charles Dayan was elected president pro tempore of the State Senate.

== State Senate ==
=== Districts ===
- The First District (4 seats) consisted of Kings, New York, Queens, Richmond and Suffolk counties.
- The Second District (4 seats) consisted of Delaware, Dutchess, Orange, Putnam, Rockland, Sullivan, Ulster and Westchester counties.
- The Third District (4 seats) consisted of Albany, Columbia, Greene, Rensselaer, Schenectady and Schoharie counties.
- The Fourth District (4 seats) consisted of Clinton, Essex, Franklin, Hamilton, Montgomery, St. Lawrence, Saratoga, Warren and Washington counties.
- The Fifth District (4 seats) consisted of Herkimer, Jefferson, Lewis, Madison, Oneida and Oswego counties.
- The Sixth District (4 seats) consisted of Broome, Chenango, Cortland, Otsego, Steuben, Tioga and Tompkins counties.
- The Seventh District (4 seats) consisted of Cayuga, Onondaga, Ontario, Seneca, Wayne and Yates counties.
- The Eighth District (4 seats) consisted of Allegany, Cattaraugus, Chautauqua, Erie, Genesee, Livingston, Monroe, Niagara and Orleans counties.
Note: There are now 62 counties in the State of New York. The counties which are not mentioned in this list had not yet been established, or sufficiently organized, the area being included in one or more of the abovementioned counties.

=== Members ===
The asterisk (*) denotes members of the previous Legislature who continued in office as members of this Legislature.

District	Senators	Term left	Party	Notes
First	Jacob Tyson	1 year	Jacksonian	elected to fill vacancy, in place of Cadwallader D. Colden; also First Judge of the Richmond County Court
First	Joshua Smith*	2 years		
First	Robert Bogardus*	3 years	Jacksonian	
First	John I. Schenck	4 years	Jacksonian	
Second	Wells Lake*	1 year		
Second	Peter R. Livingston*	2 years	Jacksonian	on January 5, elected president pro tempore
Second	Benjamin Woodward*	3 years		also Postmaster of Mount Hope
Second	Walker Todd	4 years	Jacksonian	also Postmaster of Carmel
Third	Richard McMichael*	1 year		
Third	Ambrose L. Jordan*	2 years	Adams man	
Third	John McCarty*	3 years	Jacksonian	
Third	Moses Warren	4 years	Jacksonian	
Fourth	John Crary*	1 year	Adams man	
Fourth	John L. Viele*	2 years		
Fourth	Duncan McMartin Jr.*	3 years	Adams man	
Fourth	Reuben Sanford	4 years	Adams man	
Fifth	Charles Dayan*	1 year	Jacksonian	on October 7, elected president pro tempore; in November 1828, chosen a presidential elector-at-large
Fifth	Charles Stebbins*	2 years	Jacksonian	
Fifth	Truman Enos*	3 years	Jacksonian	
Fifth	Nathaniel S. Benton	4 years	Jacksonian	until January 10, 1828, also Surrogate of Herkimer Co.
Sixth	Stukely Ellsworth*	1 year		
Sixth	Peter Hager 2d*	2 years		
Sixth	Thomas G. Waterman*	3 years		
Sixth	Grattan H. Wheeler	4 years	Adams man	
Seventh	John C. Spencer*	1 year	Adams man	
Seventh	Truman Hart*	2 years		
Seventh	William M. Oliver*	3 years	Jacksonian	until March 31, 1828, also First Judge of the Yates County Court
Seventh	George B. Throop	4 years	Jacksonian	
Eighth	Samuel Wilkeson*	1 year		
Eighth	Ethan B. Allen*	2 years		
Eighth	Charles H. Carroll*	3 years	Adams man	also First Judge of the Livingston County Court; resigned in March 1828
Eighth	Timothy H. Porter	4 years	Adams man	

=== Employees ===
- Clerk: John F. Bacon

== State Assembly ==
=== Districts ===
- Albany County (3 seats)
- Allegany County (1 seat)
- Broome County (1 seat)
- Cattaraugus County (1 seat)
- Cayuga County (4 seats)
- Chautauqua County (2 seats)
- Chenango County (3 seats)
- Clinton County (1 seat)
- Columbia County (3 seats)
- Cortland County (2 seats)
- Delaware County (2 seats)
- Dutchess County (4 seats)
- Erie County (2 seats)
- Essex County (1 seat)
- Franklin County (1 seat)
- Genesee County (3 seats)
- Greene County (2 seats)
- Hamilton and Montgomery counties (3 seats)
- Herkimer County (3 seats)
- Jefferson County (3 seats)
- Kings County (1 seat)
- Lewis County (1 seat)
- Livingston County (2 seats)
- Madison County (3 seats)
- Monroe County (3 seats)
- The City and County of New York (11 seats)
- Niagara County (1 seat)
- Oneida County (5 seats)
- Onondaga County (4 seats)
- Ontario County (3 seats)
- Orange County (3 seats)
- Orleans County (1 seat)
- Oswego County (1 seat)
- Otsego County (4 seats)
- Putnam County (1 seat)
- Queens County (1 seat)
- Rensselaer County (4 seats)
- Richmond County (1 seat)
- Rockland County (1 seat)
- St. Lawrence County (2 seats)
- Saratoga County (3 seats)
- Schenectady County (1 seat)
- Schoharie County (2 seats)
- Seneca County (2 seats)
- Steuben County (2 seats)
- Suffolk County (2 seats)
- Sullivan County (1 seat)
- Tioga County (2 seats)
- Tompkins County (3 seats)
- Ulster County (2 seats)
- Warren County (1 seat)
- Washington (3 seats)
- Wayne County (2 seats)
- Westchester County (3 seats)
- Yates County (1 seat)
Note: There are now 62 counties in the State of New York. The counties which are not mentioned in this list had not yet been established, or sufficiently organized, the area being included in one or more of the abovementioned counties.

=== Assemblymen ===
The asterisk (*) denotes members of the previous Legislature who continued as members of this Legislature.

District	Assemblymen	Party	Notes
Albany	Benjamin F. Butler	Jacksonian	
Albany	William N. Sill		
Albany	David I. D. Verplanck		
Allegany	Azel Fitch		
Broome	Peter Robinson*	Jacksonian	
Cattaraugus	James McGlashan		
Cayuga	Henry R. Brinckerhoff		
Cayuga	Gardner Kortright*		
Cayuga	William H. Noble		
Cayuga	Philo Sperry		
Chautauqua	Nathaniel Fenton		previously from Otsego??
Chautauqua	Nathan Mixer		
Chenango	Tilly Lynde	Adams man	
Chenango	Henry Mitchell	Jacksonian	
Chenango	Robert Monell	Jacksonian	in November 1828, elected to the 21st United States Congress
Clinton	Bela Edgerton*		
Columbia	Killian Miller	Adams man	
Columbia	Abel S. Peters		
Columbia	Elisha Williams	Adams man	
Cortland	John L. Boyd		
Cortland	Nathan Dayton*	Jacksonian	
Delaware	Edward Doyle		
Delaware	Erastus Root*	Jacksonian	re-elected Speaker
Dutchess	Taber Belding		
Dutchess	Francis A. Livingston		
Dutchess	George W. Slocum		
Dutchess	Nathaniel P. Tallmadge	Jacksonian	
Erie	David Burt*		
Erie	Peter B. Porter	Adams man	vacated his seat on May 23, 1828, when appointed as U.S. Secretary of War
Essex	Ezra C. Gross	Adams man	
Franklin	Luther Bradish	Adams man	
Genesee	Dennis Blakeley		
Genesee	Trumbull Cary		
Genesee	John B. Skinner*	Jacksonian	
Greene	Elisha Bishop		
Greene	William Faulkner Jr.		
Hamilton and Montgomery	Daniel F. Sacia	Jacksonian	
Hamilton and Montgomery	John S. Veeder		
Hamilton and Montgomery	Nathaniel Westcott*		
Herkimer	David R. Carrier		
Herkimer	Abijah Mann, Jr.	Jacksonian	
Herkimer	John P. Snell		
Jefferson	David W. Bucklin*	Jacksonian	
Jefferson	Alpheus S. Greene*		
Jefferson	Daniel Wardwell*	Jacksonian	
Kings	Clarence D. Sackett*		
Lewis	George D. Ruggles		
Livingston	Calvin H. Bryan		
Livingston	William Jones		
Madison	Joseph Clark		
Madison	John Knowles		
Madison	Eri Richardson		
Monroe	Timothy Childs	Adams man	in November 1828, elected to the 21st United States Congress
Monroe	Ezra Sheldon Jr.		
Monroe	Francis Storm		
New York	William Alburtis	Jacksonian	
New York	Saul Alley	Jacksonian	
New York	Philip Brasher*	Jacksonian	
New York	Abraham Cargill*	Jacksonian	
New York	Isaac Dyckman	Jacksonian	
New York	Robert Emmet	Jacksonian	
New York	Ogden Hoffman	Jacksonian	
New York	Asa Mann	Jacksonian	
New York	Shivers Parker	Jacksonian	
New York	Alpheus Sherman*	Jacksonian	
New York	Lemuel Smith*	Jacksonian	
Niagara	John Garnsey*		
Oneida	Gardiner Avery		
Oneida	(Linus Parker)		Parker did not take or claim the seat; contested by S. Sidney Breese who was seated on January 4
Oneida	Thomas E. Clarke		
Oneida	Benjamin P. Johnson*		
Oneida	Eli Savage		
Onondaga	Timothy Barber		
Onondaga	David Baxter		
Onondaga	Aaron Burt*		
Onondaga	Gideon Frothingham		
Ontario	Heman Chapin		
Ontario	Francis Granger*	Adams man	
Ontario	Robert C. Nicholas	Adams man	
Orange	Nathaniel Jones*		
Orange	Peter Milliken		
Orange	David M. Westcott		
Orleans	Lyman Bates		
Oswego	Orris Hart*		
Otsego	Joseph Clyde		
Otsego	Horace Lathrop		
Otsego	Arunah Metcalf	Adams man	
Otsego	Halsey Spencer		
Putnam	Henry B. Cowles*	Adams man	in November 1828, elected to the 21st United States Congress
Queens	Thomas Tredwell*		
Rensselaer	Samuel S. Cheever	Jacksonian	
Rensselaer	Alonzo G. Hammond		
Rensselaer	William Pierce		
Rensselaer	Joseph Wadsworth		
Richmond	Abraham Cole*		
Rockland	Levi Sherwood*		
St. Lawrence	Moses Rowley		
St. Lawrence	Jabez Willes		
Saratoga	Alpheus Goodrich		
Saratoga	Thomas Howland		
Saratoga	Eli M. Todd		
Schenectady	Alonzo C. Paige*	Jacksonian	
Schoharie	Henry Devereaux		
Schoharie	James Sweetman		
Seneca	Andrew Glover		
Seneca	Erastus Woodworth		
Steuben	Dugald Cameron		died on March 5, 1828
Steuben	William Woods	Adams man	also Surrogate of Steuben Co.
Suffolk	Abraham H. Gardiner		
Suffolk	Tredwell Scudder		also Supervisor of the Town of Islip
Sullivan	Alpheus Dimmick		
Tioga	William Maxwell		
Tioga	Jacob Swartwood		
Tompkins	Amasa Dana	Jacksonian	also D.A. of Tompkins Co.
Tompkins	Samuel H. Dean		
Tompkins	Josiah Hedden		
Ulster	Thomas H. Jansen		
Ulster	Jacob J. Schoonmaker		
Warren	Truman B. Hicks		
Washington	Jonathan Mosher		
Washington	Henry Thorn		
Washington	Henry Whiteside		
Wayne	Thomas Armstrong*	Jacksonian	also Supervisor of Butler
Wayne	Luther Fillmore		
Westchester	John Fisher*		
Westchester	Nathaniel Montross*		
Westchester	James Turk		
Yates	Morris F. Sheppard		

=== Employees ===
- Clerk: Francis Seger
- Sergeant-at-Arms: John C. Ellis
- Doorkeeper: William Seely
- Assistant Doorkeeper: James D. Scollard

== Sources ==
- The New York Civil List compiled by Franklin Benjamin Hough (Weed, Parsons and Co., 1858) [see pg. 109 and 441 for Senate districts; pg. 127 for senators; pg. 148f for Assembly districts; pg. 206f for assemblymen]
- The History of Political Parties in the State of New-York, from the Ratification of the Federal Constitution to 1840 by Jabez D. Hammond (4th ed., Vol. 2, Phinney & Co., Buffalo, 1850; pg. 258 to 288)
