= Senator Gansevoort =

Senator Gansevoort may refer to:

- Leonard Gansevoort (1751–1810), New York State Senate
- Peter Gansevoort (politician) (1788–1876), New York State Senate
