= Peter Robinson (New York politician) =

American politician

Peter Robinson (November 15, 1791 Pembroke, Merrimack County, New Hampshire – October 9, 1841 Binghamton, Broome County, New York) was an American lawyer and politician.

== Life ==
He graduated from Dartmouth College, in Hanover, New Hampshire. In 1815, he moved to Binghamton, New York. There he studied law with Thomas G. Waterman, and was admitted to the bar in 1819. He was Surrogate of Broome County from 1821 to 1823.

He was a member of the New York State Assembly (Broome Co.) in 1826, 1827, 1828, 1829, 1830 and 1831; and was Speaker in 1829.

== Sources ==
- Obit at RootsWeb
- Reminiscences of George W. Bull (pdf) The New York Times, December 30, 1879
- Settlers Info at Geocities
- The New York Civil List (1858; p. 412)

Political offices
Preceded by Erastus Root	Speaker of the New York State Assembly; 1829	Succeeded by Erastus Root
