= George Boughton =

George Boughton may refer to:

- George Henry Boughton (1834–1905), Anglo-American landscape and genre painter, illustrator and writer
- George H. Boughton (1792–1866), American politician
