= David M. Westcott =

American politician

David Mandeville Westcott

Member of the New York State Senate for the 2nd District
- In office January 1, 1831 – December 31, 1834
- Preceded by: Benjamin Woodward
- Succeeded by: John Patterson Jones

Member of the New York State Assembly for Orange Co.
- In office January 1, 1828 – December 31, 1828
- In office July 1, 1798 – June 30, 1799

Personal details
- Born: ca. 1769 Cornwall, Province of New York, British America
- Died: April 21, 1841 Goshen, New York, U.S.
- Party: Jeffersonian Democrat
- Spouse: Keziah Gale
- Relations: Alexander Wilkin (grandson)
- Children: 8

Col. David Mandeville Westcott (ca. 1769 – April 21, 1841) was an American politician and newspaper editor from New York.

== Early life ==
Westcott was likely born in Cornwall, New York in 1769. He was the son of Justice Westcott and his wife Mary.

== Career ==
In 1789, he moved to Goshen, and became co-editor of The Goshen Repository, and Weekly Intelligencer, the first newspaper published in Goshen, founded in 1788 by David Mandeville.

He was a member of the New York State Assembly, representing Orange County, in 22nd New York State Legislature from July 1, 1798, to June 30, 1799. Westcott later served as the County Clerk of Orange County from 1815 to 1819, and from 1821 to 1822. During the 51st New York State Legislature, he was again a member of the State Assembly, serving from January 1 to December 31, 1828.

Beginning on January 1, 1831, Westcott was a member of the New York State Senate, representing the 2nd District, (Note: The 2nd District consisted of Delaware, Dutchess, Orange, Putnam, Rockland, Sullivan, Ulster and Westchester counties.) sitting in the 54th, 55th, 56th and 57th New York State Legislatures and serving until December 31, 1834.

== Personal life ==
Westcott married the heiress Keziah Gale (1773–1819), the only child of Benjamin Gale. Together, they had eight children, including:

- Benjamin Gale Westcott (b. 1794).
- Catherine Westcott (d. 1860), who married James W. Palmer, a wealthy merchant from New York.
- Sarah Gale Westcott (1796–1854), who married Congressman Samuel Jones Wilkin (1793–1866), son of James Whitney Wilkin, who also served in Congress and as the Speaker of the New York State Assembly.
- Jane Westcott (1800–1892), who did not marry.
- Charlotte Westcott (1804–1880), who married Horace William Elliot (1788–1863).
- Ann Maria Westcott (1808–1897), who married Alexander Duer (1793–1819), son of Continental Congressman William Duer and grandson of William Alexander, Lord Stirling.
- David Mandeville Westcott (1810–1886), who married Sarah Van Deuzer.
- Nathan Westcott (1812–1878), an attorney who served as the Clerk of Orange County from 1844 to 1855.

His wife died of consumption in December 1819. Westcott died aged 72 in Goshen on April 21, 1841. He was buried at the Slate Hill Cemetery, also in Goshen.

New York State Senate
Preceded by Benjamin Woodward	New York State Senate; Second District (Class 4); 1831–1834	Succeeded by John P. Jones
