= Alpheus Sherman =

American politician

Alpheus Sherman (September 23, 1780 in Rochester, Plymouth County, Massachusetts – January 12, 1866 in Spring Valley, Rockland County, New York) was an American lawyer and politician from New York.

== Life ==
He was the son of Nathaniel Sherman (b. 1755) and Abigail (Haskell) Sherman (b. 1759). He was admitted to the bar in 1801. On October 3, 1807, he married Hester Utt (d. 1875), and they had twelve children.

In 1820, he was appointed Corporation Counsel of New York City.

He was a member of the New York State Assembly (New York Co.) in 1826, 1827 and 1828.

He was a member of the New York State Senate (1st D.) from 1830 to 1833, sitting in the 53rd, 54th, 55th and 56th New York State Legislatures.

In May 1840, Sherman and David Randall were appointed to the New York City Marine Court to fill the vacancies caused by the removal of John B. Scott and Effingham Schieffelin.

== Sources ==
- The New York Civil List compiled by Franklin Benjamin Hough (pages 128f, 145, 204f, 207 and 304; Weed, Parsons and Co., 1858)
- OBITUARY; Alpheus Sherman, Esq. in NYT on January 15, 1866
- The New Yorker (issue of May 16, 1840; pg. 138)
- Alpheus Sherman at Ancestry.com

New York State Senate
Preceded by Joshua Smith	New York State Senate; First District (Class 3); 1830–1833	Succeeded by Charles L. Livingston
