= Walker Todd =

American politician

Walker Todd (c. 1786 in New Milford, Litchfield County, Connecticut – August 1840 in Mount Pleasant, Westchester County, New York) was an American lawyer and politician from New York.

== Life ==
He was the son of Capt. Eli Todd and Mercy (Merwin) Todd. He graduated from Yale College in 1810. Then he studied law, was admitted to the bar in 1812, and practiced in Carmel, New York. He married Sarah Ann Smith, and they had several children.

He was Surrogate of Putnam County from 1819 to 1821, and later for some time Postmaster of Carmel.

He was a member of the New York State Senate (2nd D.) from 1828 to 1831, sitting in the 51st, 52nd, 53rd and 54th New York State Legislatures.

In 1832, he was an Inspector of Mount Pleasant State Prison. He was again Surrogate of Putnam County from 1833 to 1840.

== Sources ==
- The New York Civil List compiled by Franklin Benjamin Hough (pages 127f, 146 and 416; Weed, Parsons and Co., 1858)
- List of Post-Offices in the United States issued by the Postmaster General (1828; pg. 17)
- Death notice in American Masonic Register and Literary Companion (issue of September 5, 1840; pg. 7)
- Eighth Annual Report of the Board of Managers of the Prison Discipline Society (1833; pg. 166)

New York State Senate
Preceded by William Nelson	New York State Senate; Second District (Class 1); 1828–1831	Succeeded by Allan Macdonald
