= Luther Badger =

American lawyer and politician

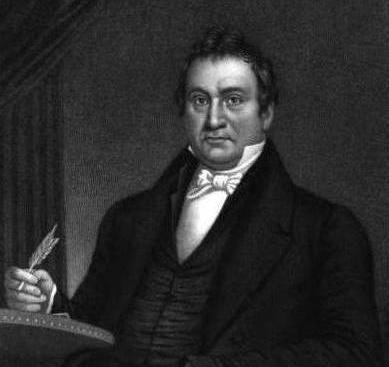

Member of the U.S. House of Representatives from New York's 23rd district
- In office March 4, 1825 – March 3, 1827
- Preceded by: Elisha Litchfield
- Succeeded by: Jonas Earll, Jr.

Personal details
- Born: April 10, 1785 Partridgefield, Berkshire County, Massachusetts
- Died: October 30, 1868 (aged 83) Jordan, Onondaga County, New York
- Citizenship: United States
- Party: Adams Whig Party
- Spouse: Eunice Wells Badger Betsey (Dimock) Avery Badger
- Profession: lawyer politician judge

Military service
- Allegiance: United States of America
- Branch/service: New York State Militia
- Years of service: 1812–1827
- Rank: sergeant major quartermaster brigadier general judge advocate
- Unit: 27th Brigade of Infantry

Luther Badger (April 10, 1785 – October 30, 1868) was an American lawyer and politician from New York.

== Early life and education ==
Badger was born in Partridgefield, Berkshire County, Massachusetts the son of Lemuel and Sabra (Smith) Badger. In 1786, the family moved to a farm on the bank of the Susquehanna River in Harpursville, Broome County, New York. He attended Hamilton-Oneida Academy for two years but did not graduate. During his college career, he taught in the common schools.

== Career ==
In 1807, Badger began to study law with William Eager in Jamesville, and in 1810 entered the law office of Randall & Wattles in New Hartford. In 1811, he married Eunice Wells. He was admitted to the bar in 1812, and practiced in Jamesville until 1824 when he retired from the bar.

Badger joined the New York State Militia as a sergeant major, was promoted to quartermaster in 1812, eventually became a brigadier general in 1819, and was judge advocate of the 27th Brigade of Infantry from 1820 to 1827 when he retired from military service.

Elected as an Adams man to the 19th United States Congress, Badger served as U.S. Representative for the twenty-third district of New York from March 4, 1825, to March 3, 1827. Afterwards, he engaged in mercantile pursuits.

In 1832, he returned to his old home in Harpursville and resumed the practice of law. He was District Attorney of Broome County from 1847 to 1849, when he resigned and resumed his private practice in Jordan, NY.

== Personal life ==
On August 28, 1845, he married Betsey (Dimock) Avery, sister of Davis Dimock, Jr.

== Death and legacy ==
Badger died on October 30, 1868, in Jordan, Onondaga County, New York; and was buried at the Jordan Cemetery.

U.S. House of Representatives
Preceded by Elisha Litchfield	Member of the U.S. House of Representatives from New York's 23rd congressional district 1825–1827	Succeeded by Jonas Earll, Jr.
