= Lewis Eaton =

American politician (1790-1857)

Member of the U.S. House of Representatives from New York's 12th district
- In office March 4, 1823 – March 3, 1825
- Preceded by: Nathaniel Pitcher; Reuben H. Walworth
- Succeeded by: William Dietz

Town Supervisor of Duanesburg
- In office 1819–1820

Sheriff of Schenectady County
- In office 1821–1822

Personal details
- Born: February 17, 1790 Duanesburg, New York, US
- Died: August 22, 1857 (aged 67) Buffalo, New York, US
- Party: Democratic-Republican
- Occupation: Farmer

Military service
- Branch/service: New York Militia
- Rank: Brigadier General

Lewis Eaton (February 17, 1790 – August 22, 1857) was a United States Congressman from New York.

== Life ==
Eaton became a farmer, also becoming active in politics, including serving as Duanesburg Town Supervisor from 1819 to 1820. From 1821 to 1822 Eaton served as Schenectady County Sheriff.

Eaton was elected as a Crawford Democratic-Republican to the 18th United States Congress, holding office from March 4, 1823, to March 3, 1825. Eaton voted in favor of the Tariff of 1824 and took part in the House caucus that nominated William Crawford for president.

After leaving the House Eaton returned to his farm, also holding the position of postmaster in the hamlet of Eaton (sometimes spelled Eatons or Eaton's) Corners. He was a member of the New York State Senate (3rd D.) from 1829 to 1832, sitting in the 52nd, 53rd, 54th and 55th New York State Legislatures. In addition, he was an active militia officer and attained the rank of Brigadier General.

In the mid-1830s Eaton moved to Lockport, New York, where he purchased the Nathan Comstock Jr. House. Eaton was Lockport's postmaster and president of the Lockport Bank, and also served as a member of the New York Bank Commission from 1832 to 1838.

In the late 1830s he relocated to the village of Black Rock (now part of Buffalo), where he resumed farming, was a clerk in the federal revenue collection office for the Niagara district, became a lumber dealer and was President of the City Bank of Buffalo.

During the 1840 election for President, Eaton was a delegate to a convention of former Democratic-Republicans who endorsed Whig nominees William Henry Harrison and John Tyler. In 1841 he was a member of the reception committee for a large gathering in New York City which honored Nathaniel P. Tallmadge following his return to the United States Senate after having switched from the Democratic Party to the Whigs.

In the early 1840s he served as a Special Agent of the United States Post Office Department, ensuring that postmasters and mail carriers did not use the service for illegal purposes.

Eaton was active in several agricultural societies and farming organizations, including being a founder and President of the Buffalo Horticultural Society. Agricultural journals and fair records from the 1820s to the 1850s are replete with entries on his prize winning cattle, pigs, poultry, asparagus, pears, apples, and other farm products, as well as notations on the prizes his wife won for her peonies and other floral arrangements.

Eaton died in Buffalo on August 22, 1857. He was originally interred at Black Rock Burial Ground, and most of the remains there, including Eaton's, were later moved to Buffalo's Forest Lawn Cemetery.

U.S. House of Representatives
Preceded by Nathaniel Pitcher; Reuben H. Walworth	Member of the U.S. House of Representatives from New York's 12th congressional district March 4, 1823 – March 3, 1825	Succeeded by William Dietz
New York State Senate
Preceded by Richard McMichael	New York State Senate; Third District (Class 2); 1829–1832	Succeeded by Peter Gansevoort
