= Coe S. Downing =

American politician (1791–1847)

Coe Searing Downing (April 7, 1791 – September 12, 1847) was an American judge and politician from New York.

== Life ==
He married Rozetta J. Seaman (1796–1824), daughter of Assemblyman Henry O. Seaman (1769–1826), and their son was Thomas B. Downing MD (1812–1839).

In 1820, Downing remarried to Jerusha Havens (1791–1876), sister of Brookhaven Town Supervisor John Symes Havens (1796–1864).

He ran a tavern and livery stable.

Downing was a member of the New York State Assembly (Kings Co.) in 1830, 1831, 1832 and 1833.

He was a member of the New York State Senate (1st D.) from 1835 to 1838, sitting in the 58th, 59th, 60th and 61st New York State Legislatures.

At the time of his death, he was a justice of the Municipal Court of Brooklyn. He was buried at the Jackson Cemetery in Wantagh, New York.

== Sources ==
- The New York Civil List compiled by Franklin Benjamin Hough (pp. 130f, 140, 209, 211ff and 271; Weed, Parsons and Co., 1858)
- Laws of the State of New York (71st Session) (1848; p. 298)
- A History of the City of Brooklyn by Henry R. Stiles (1867–70; reprinted 2007, Vol. 2, p. 51)

New York State Assembly
Preceded by John Wyckoff	New York State Assembly; Kings Co. 1830–1833	Succeeded by Philip Brasher
New York State Senate
Preceded by Jonathan S. Conklin	New York State Senate; First District (Class 4); 1835–1838	Succeeded by Gabriel Furman
