= Alonzo C. Paige =

American politician

Alonzo Christopher Paige (July 31, 1797 — March 31, 1868) was an American lawyer, politician, and judge from New York.

== Early life ==
On July 31, 1797, Paige was born in Schaghticoke, Rensselaer County, New York. Paige's father was Rev. Winslow Paige. Paige's mother was Clarissa (née Keyes) Paige.

== Education ==
In 1812, Paige graduated from Williams College. Paige was sent by his father to Montgomery County to study theology. After some time, Paige returned to Schenectady and studied law instead.

== Career ==
Paige was admitted to the bar in 1819.

Paige was a member of the New York State Assembly (Schenectady Co.) in 1827, 1828, 1829 and 1830. In 1828, he was appointed as Reporter of the New York Court of Chancery, and published 11 volumes of chancery cases until 1845.

Paige was a member of the New York State Senate (3rd D.) in 1837, and from 1839 to 1842, sitting in the 60th, 62nd, 63rd, 64th and 65th New York State Legislatures. He was a justice of the New York Supreme Court (4th D.) from 1847 to 1851, and from 1856 to 1857, and a delegate to the New York State Constitutional Convention of 1867–68.

To undertake real estate development on Hamilton Hill, where the original African Cemetery was located, Paige purchased land for an African Section at Vale Cemetery. He had the burials re-interred in Vale Cemetery at his expense. This protected the graves, as others had disturbed them on the hill in seeking sandy soil for cement making.

== Personal life ==
On July 11, 1832, Paige married Harriet Bowers Mumford. They had four children, Benjamin Mumford Paige (1834–1838, died at age 4), Clara Keyes Paige (1837–1894), Harriet Bowers Paige (1838–1895), and Edwards Winslow Paige (1844–1918). On March 31, 1867, Paige's wife died in New York. On March 31, 1868, Paige died in Schenectady, New York.

== See also ==
- Vale Cemetery and Vale Park

New York State Senate
| Preceded by John C. Kemble | New York State Senate; Third District (Class 3); 1837 | Succeeded by Edward P. Livingston |
| Preceded by Abraham L. Lawyer | New York State Senate; Third District (Class 4); 1839–1842 | Succeeded by John C. Wright |
