= Moses Warren =

American politician

Moses Warren (December 4, 1779 – February 6, 1845) was an American politician from New York.

== Life ==
Born in Peterborough, Hillsborough County, New Hampshire, Warren was the son of Daniel Warren (1752–1833) and Abigail (Drury) Warren (1751–1840). In 1806, he removed to Hoosick, New York. In 1820, he made a well-received proposal to split the state of New York into legislative districts. He was Sheriff of Rensselaer County from 1821 to 1825.

He was a member of the New York State Senate (3rd D.) from 1828 to 1831, sitting in the 51st, 52nd, 53rd and 54th New York State Legislatures.

He died at Troy, New York. A year after his death, His third son, also named Moses Warren, was appointed to a judgeship in Troy.

== Sources ==
- The New York Civil List compiled by Franklin Benjamin Hough (pages 127f, 147 and 405; Weed, Parsons and Co., 1858)
- The History of Dublin, NH (Boston, 1855; pg. 410)

New York State Senate
| Preceded by Jacob Haight | New York State Senate; Third District (Class 1); 1828–1831 | Succeeded by John W. Edmonds |
