= William H. Maynard =

American politician

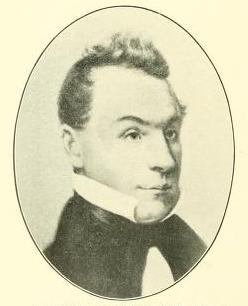
William H. Maynard

William Hale Maynard (November 23, 1786 – August 28, 1832) was an American lawyer, newspaper editor and politician from New York.

== Life ==
He was born on November 23, 1786, in Conway, then a town in Hampshire County which in 1811 became a part of Franklin County, Massachusetts. He was the son of Malachi Maynard and Anna (Hale) Maynard. He graduated from Williams College in 1810. Then he studied law with Joseph Kirkland at New Hartford, NY, and was admitted to the bar. From 1811 on, he edited the Utica Patriot.

He was an Anti-Masonic member of the New York State Senate (5th D.) from 1829 until his death in 1832, sitting in the 52nd, 53rd, 54th and 55th New York State Legislatures.

Maynard died on August 28, 1832, of cholera while preparing in New York City to attend the session of the Court for the Correction of Errors (then the highest court in the State, composed of the Chancellor, the Supreme Court justices and the State Senate); and was buried at the Hamilton College Cemetery in Clinton, NY.

Maynard never married. In his will, he bequeathed $20,000 to establish a law school at Hamilton College.

== Sources ==
- The New York Civil List compiled by Franklin Benjamin Hough (pages 128f and 143; Weed, Parsons and Co., 1858)
- Obituary in The American Annual Register for the Year 1832-33 (William Jackson, New York City, 1835; pg. 416)

New York State Senate
Preceded by Charles Dayan	New York State Senate; Fifth District (Class 2); 1829–1832	Succeeded by John G. Stower
