= Erastus Root =

American politician (1773–1846)

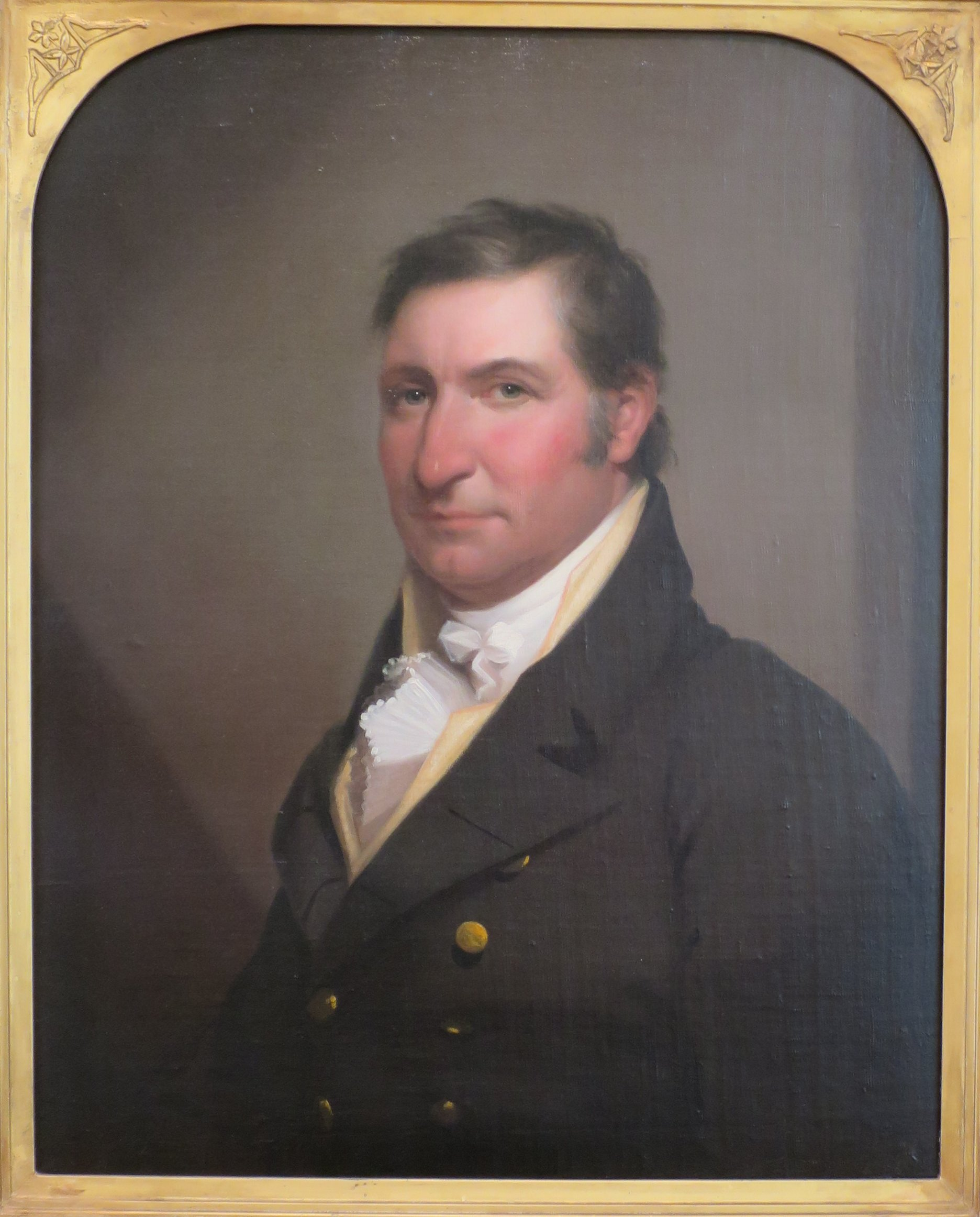
- Portrait by Rembrandt Peale, 1823

Lieutenant Governor of New York
- In office January 1, 1823 – December 31, 1824
- Governor: Joseph C. Yates
- Preceded by: John Tayler
- Succeeded by: James Tallmadge Jr.

Member of the U.S. House of Representatives from New York
- In office March 4, 1831 – March 4, 1833
- Preceded by: Perkins King
- Succeeded by: John Cramer
- Constituency: 11th district
- In office December 26, 1815 – March 4, 1817
- Preceded by: Samuel Sherwood
- Succeeded by: Dorrance Kirtland
- Constituency: 8th district
- In office March 4, 1809 – March 4, 1811
- Preceded by: Nathan Wilson
- Succeeded by: Arunah Metcalf
- Constituency: 12th district
- In office March 4, 1803 – March 4, 1805
- Preceded by: Seat established
- Succeeded by: John Russell
- Constituency: 14th district

Personal details
- Born: March 16, 1773 Hebron, Connecticut Colony, British America
- Died: December 24, 1846 (aged 73) New York City, US
- Resting place: Woodland Cemetery
- Party: Democratic-Republican (Before 1831) Jacksonian (1831–1838) Whig (1838–1846)
- Spouse: Elizabeth Stockton (m. 1806)
- Parent(s): William Root; Zeruiah Baldwin Root
- Education: Dartmouth College

Military service
- Branch/service: New York State Militia
- Rank: Major General

Erastus Root (March 16, 1773 – December 24, 1846) was an early American lawyer and politician from New York. He is most notable for serving four non-consecutive terms in the U.S. House of Representatives in the early 19th century.

== Early life ==
Root was born on March 16, 1773, in Hebron in the Connecticut Colony. He was a son of William Root (1731–1790) and Zeruiah (née Baldwin) Root (1729–1792).

He graduated from Dartmouth College in 1793 and became a teacher. Then he studied law, was admitted to the bar in 1796, and commenced practice in Delhi, New York.

== Career ==
Erastus Root was a member of the New York State Assembly (Delaware Co.) in 1798–99, 1800–01, and 1802.

=== Tenures in Congress ===
Root was elected as a Democratic-Republican to the 8th United States Congress, holding office from March 4, 1803, to March 3, 1805. Afterwards he resumed his law practice. He was then elected to the 11th United States Congress, holding office from March 4, 1809, to March 3, 1811, and was Chairman of the Committee on Claims. Root was a member of the New York State Senate (Middle D.) from 1812 to 1815, sitting in the 35th, 36th, 37th, and 38th New York State Legislatures.

In 1815, Root contested successfully the election of John Adams to the 14th United States Congress arguing that ballots that were cast for "Erastus Rott" should be counted for him, and took his seat on December 26, 1815, served until March 3, 1817, and was Chairman of the Committee on Expenditures in the War Department.

He was again a member of the State Assembly (Delaware Co.) in 1818, 1819, 1820, and 1820–21; and was a delegate to the New York State Constitutional Convention of 1821. He was Lieutenant Governor of New York from 1823 to 1824, but was defeated when running for re-election on the ticket with Samuel Young in 1824. However, in March–April 1824, Erastus Root was honored with two votes at the Democratic-Republican Party Caucus to be the party's candidate for U.S. Vice President at the election later that year.

He was again a member of the State Assembly (Delaware Co.) in 1826, 1827, 1828, and 1830; and was Speaker in 1827, 1828, and 1830.

He was elected as a Jacksonian to the 22nd United States Congress, holding office from March 4, 1831, to March 3, 1833, and was Chairman of the Committee on Agriculture. In 1838, this time as a Whig, he ran again for the House but was defeated.

He was again a member of the State Senate (3rd D.) from 1840 to 1843, sitting in the 63rd, 64th, 65th, and 66th New York State Legislatures.

=== Militia ===
Root also served as Major-General of the New York State Militia.

== Personal life ==
On October 4, 1806, Root was married to Elizabeth Stockton (1788–1871), a daughter of Charles W. Stockton and Elizabeth (née North) Stockton. Together, they were the parents of five children, three girls and two boys, including:

- Juliana Root (1807–1898), who married U.S. Representative Selah Reeve Hobbie (1797–1854) in 1826.
- Charles Root (1809–1828), who died aboard the USS Hudson in Rio de Janeiro in December 1828.
- Elizabeth Root (1813–1868), who married Henry Lee Robinson (1812–1901), a Brig. Gen. in the Union Army during the U.S. Civil War.
- William Root (b. 1814), who married Emily (née Wheelock) Dickinson (1816–1857), a daughter of Col. J. Wheelock.
- Augusta Root (1815–1838), who married William Fuller.

Root died in New York City on December 24, 1846. He was originally buried at the Old Cemetery, but later re-interred at Woodland Cemetery, both in Delhi.

=== Legacy and honors ===
The Town of Root in Montgomery County, New York is named for him.

U.S. House of Representatives
New district	Member of the U.S. House of Representatives from New York's 14th congressional district 1803–1805	Succeeded by John Russell
Preceded by Nathan Wilson	Member of the U.S. House of Representatives from New York's 12th congressional district 1809–1811	Succeeded by Arunah Metcalf
Preceded by Samuel Sherwood	Member of the U.S. House of Representatives from New York's 8th congressional district 1815–1817	Succeeded by Dorrance Kirtland
Political offices
Preceded by John Tayler	Lieutenant Governor of New York; 1823–1824	Succeeded by James Tallmadge, Jr.
Preceded by Samuel Young	Speaker of the New York State Assembly; 1827–1828	Succeeded by Peter Robinson
Preceded by Peter Robinson	Speaker of the New York State Assembly; 1830	Succeeded by George R. Davis
U.S. House of Representatives
Preceded by Perkins King	Member of the U.S. House of Representatives from New York's 11th congressional district 1831–1833	Succeeded by John Cramer
New York State Senate
Preceded by James Powers	New York State Senate; Third District (Class 1); 1840–1843	Succeeded by Stephen C. Johnson
