= Randall Graves =

American politician

Randall Graves (March 19, 1792 Ashfield, then in Hampshire Co., now in Franklin County, Massachusetts - December 10, 1831) was an American politician from New York

== Life ==
He was the son of Randall Graves (1760–1831) and Lydia (Coolidge) Graves (b. 1760). On March 19, 1816, he married Betsey Butler (1798–1849), and they had five children.

He was a member of the New York State Assembly (Steuben Co.) in 1829.

== Sources ==
- The New York Civil List compiled by Franklin Benjamin Hough (pages 208 and 277; Weed, Parsons and Co., 1858)
- The New York Annual Register, for 1830 by Edwin Williams (pg. 96)
- Randall Graves (1792-1831) at Ancestry.com
- Graves genealogy at Family Tree Maker
