= Thomas Armstrong (New York politician) =

American politician

Thomas Armstrong (November 13, 1785 - January 2, 1867) was an American politician from New York.

== Life ==
Thomas Armstrong's father, also named Thomas Armstrong, emigrated from Ireland in 1775. The family initially settled near Stillwater, in Saratoga County, New York; however, sometime after the American Revolution, they were among the pioneer settlers of Wolcott (Wayne County, New York), where Armstrong was active in local government and politics.

He was Supervisor of the Town of Wolcott for part of 1818. He was a member of the New York State Assembly (Seneca Co.) in 1820. In 1823, Wayne County was created from parts of Ontario and Seneca counties, and Armstrong was elected the first Sheriff of Wayne County, in office from 1823 to 1825.

In 1826, the Town of Butler was separated from Wolcott, and Armstrong was the first Supervisor of the town, in office from 1826 to 1833. He was again a member of the State Assembly (Wayne Co.) in 1827, 1828, and 1829; and Chairman of the Board of Supervisors of Wayne County in 1829, 1830, 1831, and 1833.

He was a member of the New York State Senate (7th D.) from 1830 to 1837, sitting in the 53rd, 54th, 55th, 56th, 57th, 58th, 59th, and 60th New York State Legislatures.

He was again Supervisor of the Town of Butler in 1838; a member of the State Assembly (Wayne Co.) in 1839; Town Supervisor in 1844, 1845, 1850 and 1851; and Chairman of the Board of Supervisors in 1844, 1850, and 1851.

He was buried at the Butler Center Cemetery in Butler.

== Sources ==
- The New York Civil List compiled by Franklin Benjamin Hough (pages 128f, 138, 196, 206f, 209, 222 and 256; Weed, Parsons and Co., 1858)
- Military History of Wayne County by Lewis H. Clark (Sodus NY, 1863; pg. 11, 14, 17ff, 28 and 42)
- Tombstone transcriptions at NY Gen Web

New York State Senate
Preceded by Truman Hart	New York State Senate; Seventh District (Class 3); 1830–1837	Succeeded by John Maynard
