= John I. Schenck =

American politician (1787–1833)

John I. Schenck (February 11, 1787 – April 22, 1833) was an American politician from New York.

== Life ==
He was the son of State Senator John Schenck (1740–1831) and Elizabeth (Layton) Schenck (d. 1825). On April 13, 1813, he married Susan Smith (1794–1822), and they had four children: Sylvanus S. Schenck (1814–1829), Mary Elizabeth Schenck (1816–1837) and the twins John Calvin Schenck (1819–1887) and Martin Luther Schenck (1819–1831). The family lived at Manhasset, New York.

He was a member of the New York State Senate (1st D.) from 1828 to 1831, sitting in the 51st, 52nd, 53rd and 54th New York State Legislatures.

He, his wife, and his children were all buried at the Dutch Reformed Cemetery in Manhasset.

== Sources ==
- The New York Civil List compiled by Franklin Benjamin Hough (pages 127f and 145; Weed, Parsons and Co., 1858)

New York State Senate
Preceded by David Gardiner	New York State Senate; First District (Class 1); 1828–1831	Succeeded by Harman B. Cropsey
