= John F. Hubbard =

American politician

John F. Hubbard (February 15, 1795 – October 5, 1876) was an American newspaper editor and politician from New York.

== Life ==
From 1816 on, he published the Norwich Journal. In February 1820, he married Almira Mead (1800-1878; daughter of Gen. Thompson Mead), and they had five children, among them State Senator John F. Hubbard Jr. (born 1822).

He was a member of the New York State Assembly (Chenango Co.) in 1824.

He was a member of the New York State Senate (2nd D.) from 1829 to 1836, sitting in the 52nd, 53rd, 54th, 55th, 56th, 57th, 58th and 59th New York State Legislatures.

He died on October 5, 1876, in Norwich, Chenango County, New York.

== Sources ==
- The New York Civil List compiled by Franklin Benjamin Hough (pages 128ff, 142, 200 and 282; Weed, Parsons and Co., 1858)
- John F. Hubbard at Ancestry.com

New York State Senate
| Preceded by Stukely Ellsworth | New York State Senate; Sixth District (Class 2); 1829–1836 | Succeeded by Daniel S. Dickinson |
