= Thomas G. Waterman =

American politician

- Born: January 23, 1788; New York City
- Died: January 7, 1862 (aged 73); Binghamton, Broome County, New York
- Occupations: Lawyer, Politician

Thomas Glasby Waterman (January 23, 1788 New York City – January 7, 1862 Binghamton, Broome County, New York) was an American lawyer and politician from New York.

== Life ==
He was the son of David Waterman (b. 1749), a member of the Connecticut House of Representatives in 1794 and 1800, and Elizabeth (Wells) Waterman. The family removed to Salisbury, Connecticut, when Thomas was still a child. He graduated from Yale College in 1806.

He studied law at Litchfield Law School, and later with Samuel Sherwood at Delhi, NY. He was admitted to the bar in 1809, and practiced in partnership with Sherwood. In 1812, he removed to Owego, to practice law there, but a few months later went on to Binghamton.

In 1813, he married Pamela Whitney, daughter of Gen. Joshua Whitney (assemblyman 1816–17).

He was District Attorney of Broome County from 1822 to 1823. He was a member of the New York State Assembly (Broome Co.) in 1824.

He was a member of the New York State Senate (6th D.) from 1827 to 1830, sitting in the 50th, 51st, 52nd and 53rd New York State Legislatures.

NY Assemblyman Luther Waterman (1753–1807) was his uncle. He also published the book Powers and Duties of Justices of the Peace in 1828.

His son, Joshua Whitney Waterman, married firstly Eliza Cameron Davenport, and secondly, her sister, Fanny Davenport, both siblings of Ira Davenport.

== Sources ==
- The New York Civil List compiled by Franklin Benjamin Hough (pages 127f, 147, 200, 314 and 370; Weed, Parsons and Co., 1858)
- Obituary Record of Graduates issued by Yale University (pg. 60) [gives wrong year of Assembly tenure "1826"]

New York State Senate
Preceded by Isaac Ogden	New York State Senate; Sixth District (Class 4); 1827–1830	Succeeded by Charles W. Lynde
