= Jonathan S. Conklin =

American politician

Jonathan Stratton Conklin (October 18, 1770 in East Hampton, Suffolk County, New York – June 20, 1839 in East Hampton, Suffolk Co., NY) was an American politician from New York.

== Life ==
He was the son of Nathaniel Conklin (c. 1736–1788) and Mehitable (Stratton) Conklin (c. 1740–1784). On November 13, 1799, he married Phebe P. Stratton.

He was a member of the New York State Assembly (Suffolk Co.) in 1811 and 1814.

He was a member of the New York State Senate (1st D.) from 1830 to 1834, sitting in the 53rd, 54th, 55th, 56th and 57th New York State Legislatures.

He was a delegate to the 1832 Democratic National Convention at Baltimore.

He was buried at the North End Cemetery in East Hampton.

== Sources ==
- The New York Civil List compiled by Franklin Benjamin Hough (pages 128ff, 139, 185, 189 and 267; Weed, Parsons and Co., 1858)
- Jonathan S. Conklin at Long Island Surnames
- Summary of the Proceedings of a Convention of Republican Delegates (Albany, 1832; pg. 3)

New York State Senate
| Preceded by Robert Bogardus | New York State Senate; First District (Class 4); 1830–1834 | Succeeded by Coe S. Downing |
