= Truman Enos =

American politician

Truman Enos (January 8, 1777 – April 15, 1858) was an American politician from New York.

== Life ==
He lived in Westmoreland, Oneida County, New York.

He was a member of the New York State Senate (5th D.) from 1827 to 1830, sitting in the 50th, 51st, 52nd and 53rd New York State Legislatures.

He was buried at the Westmoreland Union (New) Cemetery.

== Sources ==
- The New York Civil List compiled by Franklin Benjamin Hough (pages 127f and 140; Weed, Parsons and Co., 1858)

New York State Senate
Preceded by Sherman Wooster	New York State Senate; Fifth District (Class 4); 1827–1830	Succeeded by Henry A. Foster
