= Francis Seger =

American politician

Francis Seger (March 12, 1796, in Berne, Albany County, New York – April or May 1872, in Lyons Falls, Lewis County, New York) was an American lawyer and politician from New York.

== Life ==
He was the son of Garrett Seger and Catherine Seger. Seger was "crippled in one of his arms."

He was admitted to the bar in 1823. In 1826, he moved to Lewis County. He married Laura Eliza Lyon, sister of Gov. Caleb Lyon (1822–1875).

Seger was Deputy Clerk for several years, and Clerk of the New York State Assembly in 1828, 1829, 1830, 1831, 1832 and 1833.

He was a member of the New York State Senate (5th D.) from 1834 to 1837, sitting in the 57th, 58th, 59th and 60th New York State Legislatures. Here he advocated the construction of the Black River Canal which was begun in 1837. The northern end of the canal was at the Black River in Lyons Falls, within sight from Seger's residence.

He was Supervisor of the Town of Greig from 1840 to 1843. He was First Judge of the Lewis County Court from 1843 to 1855, and also Surrogate from 1847 to 1855. He was one of the secretaries of the New York State Constitutional Convention of 1846.

At the New York state election, 1853, Seger ran on the Soft Democratic ticket for New York State Treasurer, but was defeated by Whig Elbridge G. Spaulding.

Seger was a freemason, and in 1854 was chosen as Deputy Grand Master of the Grand Lodge of Odd Fellows of Northern New York.

He was again Supervisor of the Town of Greig in 1865, and from 1867 to 1871.

He was buried at the Green-Wood Cemetery in Brooklyn.

== Sources ==
- The New York Civil List compiled by Franklin Benjamin Hough (pages 58, 130f, 145, 206f, 209f, 212f, and 361; Weed, Parsons and Co., 1858)
- The Democratic State Convention; The Softs and the Hards in NYT on September 16, 1853
- Grand Lodge I. O. of O. F. of Northern New York in NYT on August 24, 1854
- History of Greig NY transcribed from History of Lewis County, NY, and Its People by Franklin B. Hough (1883); at Ray's Place
- Marriage & Death Dates transcribed from Lowville newspapers; at Dunham Wilcox
- Lyon family history at Lyons Falls History Association
- History of Lewis County NY by Franklin B. Hough (Munsell & Rowland, Albany NY, 1860; pg. 262)

New York State Senate
Preceded by Alvin Bronson	New York State Senate; Fifth District (Class 3); 1834–1837	Succeeded by Avery Skinner
