= Robert C. Nicholas (New York politician) =

American politician

Robert Carter Nicholas (December 6, 1801 — May 10, 1854) was an American politician from New York.

== Life ==
He was the son of Congressman John Nicholas (1764–1819). The family removed from Williamsburg, Virginia to Geneva, New York in 1803. He married Mary S. Rose (1809–1837), daughter of Congressman Robert S. Rose (1774–1835).

He was an Anti-Masonic member of the New York State Assembly (Ontario Co.) in 1828, 1829, 1830 and 1832.

He was a Whig member of the New York State Senate (7th D.) from 1839 to 1842, sitting in the 62nd, 63rd, 64th and 65th New York State Legislatures. He was a delegate to the New York State Constitutional Convention of 1846.

He and his wife were buried at the Pulteney Street Cemetery in Geneva.

Judge Robert C. Nicholas (1729–1780) was his grandfather; U.S. Senator Robert C. Nicholas (1793–1857) was his first cousin; Kentucky Attorney General George Nicholas (c. 1754–1799) and Governor Wilson Cary Nicholas (1761–1820) were his uncles; Congressman Robert L. Rose (1804–1877) was his brother-in-law.

== Sources ==
- The New York Civil List compiled by Franklin Benjamin Hough (pages 59, 132f, 144, 207ff, 212 and 294; Weed, Parsons and Co., 1858)
- Pulteney Street Cemetery tombstone transcriptions (These were made in 1882, the cemetery was closed in 1920 and the burials removed to Glenwood Cemetery.)

New York State Senate
Preceded by Chester Loomis	New York State Senate; Seventh District (Class 4); 1839–1842	Succeeded by John Porter
