= John McLean Jr. =

American politician

John McLean (April 20, 1793 - December 5, 1858) was an American lawyer and politician from New York.

== Life ==
He was the son of State Senator John McLean (1760–1834) and Mary (Van Kirk) McLean (1762–1835). He married Maria Blanchard (1796–1827), a daughter of Assemblyman and First Judge Anthony I. Blanchard.

McLean graduated A.M. from Union College in 1815. Then he studied law, and was admitted to the bar in 1818.

McLean was a member of the New York State Assembly (Warren and Washington Co.) in 1818.

He was a member of the New York State Senate (4th D.) from 1829 to 1832, sitting in the 52nd, 53rd, 54th, and 55th New York State Legislatures.

He was First Judge of the Washington County Court from 1835 to 1847. He was again a member of the State Senate in 1837. He was a Regent of the University of the State of New York from 1835 until his death.

He died of pneumonia and was buried at the Evergreen Cemetery in Salem, NY.

Congressman Henry H. Ross was married to Susannah Blanchard, a sister of McLean's wife.

== Sources ==
- The New York Civil List compiled by Franklin Benjamin Hough (pages 128f, 131, 143, 194, 290 and 365; Weed, Parsons and Co., 1858)
- Obituary in The Historical Magazine (Vol. III, 1859; pg. 28)
- A General Catalogue of the Officers, Graduates and Students of Union College (Schenectady NY, 1854; pg. 23)

New York State Senate
| Preceded by John Crary | New York State Senate; Fourth District (Class 2); 1829–1832 | Succeeded by Louis Hasbrouck |
| Preceded by Isaac W. Bishop | New York State Senate; Fourth District (Class 3); 1837 | Succeeded by Martin Lee |
