= Reuben Sanford =

American politician

Reuben Sanford (December 3, 1780 Woodbury, Connecticut – May 19, 1855 Columbus, Ohio) was an American politician from New York.

== Biography ==
He was the son of Oliver Sanford (1744–1817) and Phebe (Newton) Sanford (1748–1793). About 1800, he removed to that part of Jay, New York which was separated in 1821 as the Town of Dansville, and renamed Wilmington in 1822. On February 16, 1804, he married Polly Lewis (1784–1869), and they had seven children. He was a major of an independent battalion drawn from Essex County, New York, Sanford's Battalion, which was set off from the New York State 9th Regiment of Infantry during the War of 1812. He and his men fought in the Battle of Plattsburgh in September, 1814.

He was a member of the New York State Assembly (Essex Co.) in 1814-15, 1816 and 1816-17. He was a delegate to the New York State Constitutional Convention of 1821. He was Postmaster of Wilmington from before 1830 until 1842. He was a member of the New York State Senate (4th D.) from 1828 to 1831, sitting in the 51st, 52nd, 53rd and 54th New York State Legislatures.

He was buried at the Green Lawn Cemetery, Columbus, Ohio.

== Sources ==
- Minutes of the Council of Appointment of the State of New York, Volume II, pg. 1440.
- The New York Civil List compiled by Franklin Benjamin Hough (pages 57, 127f, 145, 189f, 192 and 301; Weed, Parsons and Co., 1858)
- Table of the Post Offices in the United States issued by the Postmaster General (1831; pg. 52)
- Register of All Officers and Agents, Civil, Military, and Naval, in the Service of the United States issued by the US State Department (1843; pg. 151)
- Sanford genealogy

New York State Assembly
Preceded by Levi Thompson	New York State Assembly; Essex Co. 1814–1817	Succeeded by John Hoffnagle
New York State Senate
Preceded by Silas Wright, Jr.	New York State Senate; Fourth District (Class 1); 1828–1831	Succeeded by Josiah Fisk
