= Charles Stebbins =

American politician

Acting Lieutenant Governor of New York
- In office 1829
- Governor: Enos T. Throop
- Preceded by: Enos T. Throop
- Succeeded by: William M. Oliver (acting)

Member of the New York State Senate from the 3rd district
- In office 1826–1829
- Preceded by: Thomas Greenley
- Succeeded by: Alvin Bronson

Personal details
- Born: June 23, 1789 Williamstown, Massachusetts, U.S.
- Died: March 23, 1873 (aged 83) Cazenovia, New York, U.S.
- Education: Williams College

Charles Stebbins (June 23, 1789 – March 23, 1873) was an American lawyer and politician from New York. Stebbins served as a member of the New York State Senate and as the acting lieutenant governor of New York in 1829.

== Early life and education ==
Stebbins was born in Williamstown, Massachusetts. After graduating from Williams College in 1807, he studied law and was admitted to the bar in 1810.

== Career ==
Prior to entering politics, Stebbins worked as a lawyer in Cazenovia, New York.

He was a member of the New York State Senate from 1826 to 1829, sitting in the 49th, 50th, 51st and 52nd New York State Legislatures. When Governor Van Buren resigned to become Secretary of State in March 1829, and Lieutenant Governor Enos T. Throop succeeded to the governorship, Stebbins was elected President pro tempore of the State Senate and was Acting Lieutenant Governor of New York until the end of 1829.

He was one of the three Bank Commissioners, appointed by the Governor. In 1842, he served as president of the Farmers' Loan and Trust Company in New York City.

== Personal life ==
In 1819, he married Eunice Masters. He was buried at the Evergreen Cemetery in Cazenovia, New York.

== Sources ==
New York State Senate
Preceded by Thomas Greenly	New York State Senate; Fifth District (Class 3); 1826–1829	Succeeded by Alvin Bronson
Political offices
Preceded by Enos T. Throop	Lieutenant Governor of New York; Acting; 1829	Succeeded by William M. Oliver; Acting
