= Benjamin Woodward (New York politician) =

American politician

Benjamin Woodward (February 28, 1780 – May 11, 1841 Beaver Brook, Sullivan County, New York) was an American politician from New York.

== Life ==
He was the son of Hezekiah Woodward.

In 1807, Benjamin Woodward removed to Mount Hope, and Woodward was for some time Postmaster there.

He was a member of the New York State Assembly (Orange Co.) in 1814-15, 1820-21 and 1826.

He was a delegate to the New York State Constitutional Convention (Orange Co.) of 1821.

He was a member of the New York State Senate (2nd D.) from 1827 to 1830, sitting in the 50th, 51st, 52nd and 53rd New York State Legislatures.

He was buried at the Mount Hope Plains Cemetery in Otisville.

== Sources ==
- The New York Civil List compiled by Franklin Benjamin Hough (pages 57, 127f, 147, 190, 197, 204 and 317; Weed, Parsons and Co., 1858)
- List of Post-Offices in the United States, with the Names of the Postmasters issued by the U.S. Postmaster General (1828; pg. 77)
- From Abbotts to Zurich: New York State Placenames by Ren Vasiliev (Syracuse University Press, 2004; pg. 151)

New York State Senate
Preceded by James Burt	New York State Senate; Second District (Class 4); 1827–1829	Succeeded by David M. Westcott
