= Alvin Bronson =

American politician (1783–1881)

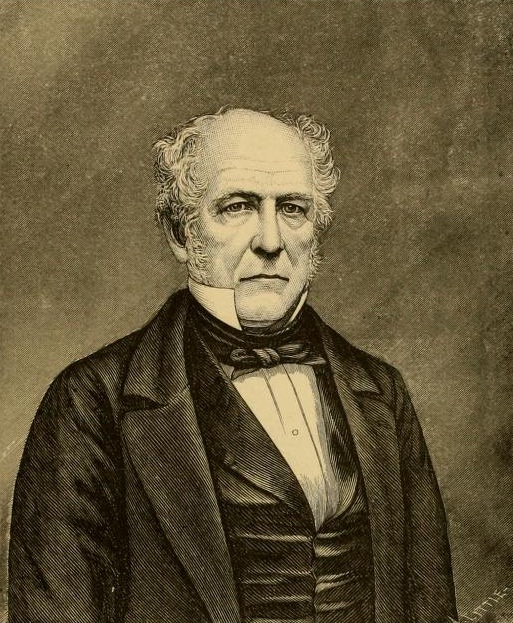
- Bronson in 1877
- Born: May 19, 1783; Waterbury, Connecticut, U.S.
- Died: April 2, 1881 (aged 97); Oswego, New York, U.S.

Alvin Bronson (May 19, 1783 – April 2, 1881) was an American businessman and politician from New York.

== Life ==
He was the son of Josiah Bronson (b. 1752) and Tabitha (Tuttle) Bronson, and was born on May 19, 1783, in that part of Waterbury which was separated in 1807 as the Town of Middlebury in New Haven County, Connecticut.

In 1810, he removed to Oswego, New York, and ran a shipping company there. During the War of 1812, several of Bronson's ships were used by the U.S. Navy to transport supplies on Lake Ontario, and the loss of the schooner Penelope during the Battle of Oswego led to a claim for compensation that was denied first by the New York Supreme Court, and then by the House of Representatives in 1821.

He was Supervisor of the Town of Oswego from 1822 to 1824; and a member of the New York State Senate (5th D.) in 1823 and 1824.

In 1828, he became the first President of the Village of Oswego.

He was again a member of the State Senate from 1830 to 1833, sitting in the 53rd, 54th, 55th and 56th New York State Legislatures.

In 1868, he published An Essay on the Commerce and Transportation of the Vallies of the Great Lakes and Rivers of the North-West (on-line version; 6 pages).

He died on April 2, 1881, in Oswego, New York.

== Sources ==
- No. 548 Loss of the Schooner Penelope in American State Papers (1834; pg. 761ff)
- Around Oswego by Terrance M. Prior & Nathalie J. Siembor (1996; ISBN 978-0-7385-3912-6 ; short bio and portrait on pg. 92)
- A POLITICAL VETERAN; Alvin Bronson... in NYT on June 23, 1878
- BIOGRAPHICAL MEMOIR OF ALVAN (sic) BRONSON; PREPARED BY HIMSELF in History of Waterbury (pg. 450; genealogical info in Appendix on pg. 471 and 474)

New York State Senate
Preceded by new district	New York State Senate; Fifth District (Class 2); 1823–1824	Succeeded by George Brayton
Preceded by Charles Stebbins	New York State Senate; Fifth District (Class 3); 1830–1833	Succeeded by Francis Seger
