= John McCarty (born 1782) =

American politician

John McCarty (November 19, 1782 Watervliet, Albany County, New York – September 1, 1851 Coeymans, Albany Co., NY) was an American politician from New York.

== Life ==
He was the son of Gen. David McCarty (1737–1812; assemblyman in 1792) and Charlotte (Coeymans) McCarty (1746–1828). In 1806, he married Helen Verplanck (1783–1832), and they had six children.

He was a member of the New York State Senate (3rd D.) from 1827 to 1830, sitting in the 50th, 51st, 52nd and 53rd New York State Legislatures.

He was buried at the Grove Cemetery in Coeymans.

Congressman Richard McCarty was his brother.

== Sources ==
- The New York Civil List compiled by Franklin Benjamin Hough (pages 127f and 143; Weed, Parsons and Co., 1858)
- DeWitt Clinton and the Rise of the People's Men by Craig & Mary L. Hanyan (pg. 248)
- McCarty genealogy at Family Tree Maker

New York State Senate
Preceded by James Mallory	New York State Senate; Third District (Class 4); 1827–1830	Succeeded by Herman I. Quackenboss
