= Moses Hayden =

American politician

Member of the U.S. House of Representatives from New York's 27th district
- In office March 4, 1823 – March 3, 1827
- Preceded by: New district
- Succeeded by: Daniel D. Barnard

Member of the New York State Senate from the 8th (Class 2) district
- In office 1829–1830
- Preceded by: Samuel Wilkeson
- Succeeded by: Philo C. Fuller

Personal details
- Born: June 1785 Conway, Massachusetts, U.S.
- Died: February 13, 1830 (aged 44) Albany, New York, U.S.
- Resting place: Mount Pleasant Cemetery, Fowlerville, New York, U.S.
- Party: Democratic-Republican; Anti-Masonic

Moses Hayden (June 1785 – February 13, 1830) was an American lawyer and politician from New York.

== Life ==
He was the son of Dr. Moses Hayden (1742–1813) and Triphena (French, Childs) Hayden (b. 1756). He completed preparatory studies, and graduated from Williams College in 1804. Then he studied law, was admitted to the bar in 1808, and commenced practice in Pittsfield, Massachusetts. On August 8, 1809, he married Elizabeth Williams (d. 1825). They had no children.

Later he removed to York, New York, and was First Judge of the Livingston County Court from 1821 to 1823.

Hayden was elected as an Adams-Clay Democratic-Republican to the 18th, and re-elected as an Adams man to the 19th United States Congress, holding office from March 4, 1823, to March 3, 1827.

He was an Anti-Masonic member of the New York State Senate (8th D.) from 1829 until his death in 1830, sitting in the 52nd and 53rd New York State Legislatures. He was buried at the Mount Pleasant Cemetery in Fowlerville, a hamlet in York.

U.S. House of Representatives
New district	Member of the U.S. House of Representatives from New York's 27th congressional district 1823–1827	Succeeded by Daniel D. Barnard
New York State Senate
Preceded by Samuel Wilkeson	New York State Senate; Eighth District (Class 2); 1829–1830	Succeeded by Philo C. Fuller
