= Henry Phoenix =

Welsh footballer

Personal information
- Date of birth: 1856
- Place of birth: Wales
- Position: Half back

Senior career*
Years	Team	Apps	(Gls)
1876–1878	Wrexham Grosvenor		
1878–1879	Wrexham Albion		
1880–1882	Wrexham		

International career
1882	Wales	1	(0)
- * Club domestic league appearances and goals

Henry Phoenix (1856–?) was a Welsh international footballer. He was part of the Wales national football team, playing 1 match on 25 March 1882 against Scotland .

At club level, he played for Wrexham in the 1880s.

== See also ==
- List of Wales international footballers (alphabetical)
