= Elisha Litchfield =

American politician (1785–1859)

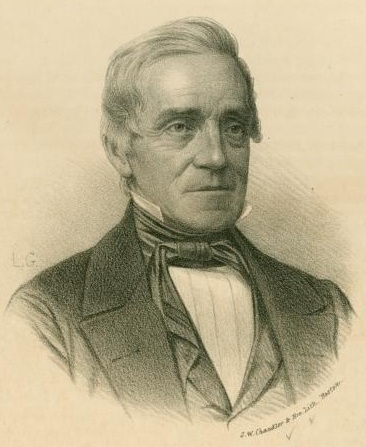
Elisha Litchfield

Elisha Litchfield (July 12, 1785 Canterbury, Connecticut – August 4, 1859 Cazenovia, New York) was an American merchant and politician from New York.

== Life ==
He attended the common schools, and learned the carpenter's trade. In November 1808, he married Percy Tiffany (d. 1827), and they had five children, among them Edwin Clark Litchfield (1815–1885).

In 1812, he removed to Delphi. He fought in the War of 1812 and was promoted to Major. He was a Justice of the Peace and Supervisor of Onondaga County. He abandoned carpentry, and became a merchant. He was appointed Postmaster of Delphi on November 28, 1817, and served until June 25, 1821.

He was a member of the New York State Assembly in 1819. Litchfield was elected as a Democratic-Republican to the 17th, and as a Crawford Democratic-Republican to the 18th United States Congress, holding office from December 3, 1821, to March 3, 1825. In 1828, he married Lucy Bacon, widow of Dr. Enos Bacon, and they had four children. He was again a member of the State Assembly in 1831, 1832, 1833 and 1844, and was Speaker in 1844. Afterward, he moved to Cazenovia and died there on August 4, 1859. He was buried at the City Cemetery in Delphi Falls.

His son, Edwin C. Litchfield, ran for Congress as a Democrat in 1858 in the 2nd District, but was defeated by Republican James Humphrey.

== Sources ==
- United States Congress. "Elisha Litchfield (id: L000346)". Biographical Directory of the United States Congress.
- The New England Historical and Genealogical Register published by the New England Historic Genealogical Society (1855; Vol. IX; pages 215f)
- The Nominee of the Second Congressional District in NYT on October 6, 1858
- EDWIN C. LITCHFIELD obit in NYT on July 23, 1885

U.S. House of Representatives
Preceded by George Hall	Member of the U.S. House of Representatives from New York's 19th congressional district 1821–1823	Succeeded by John Richards
New district	Member of the U.S. House of Representatives from New York's 23rd congressional district 1823–1825	Succeeded by Luther Badger
Political offices
Preceded by George R. Davis	Speaker of the New York State Assembly; 1844	Succeeded by Horatio Seymour
