= Peter Gansevoort (politician) =

American politician (1788–1876)

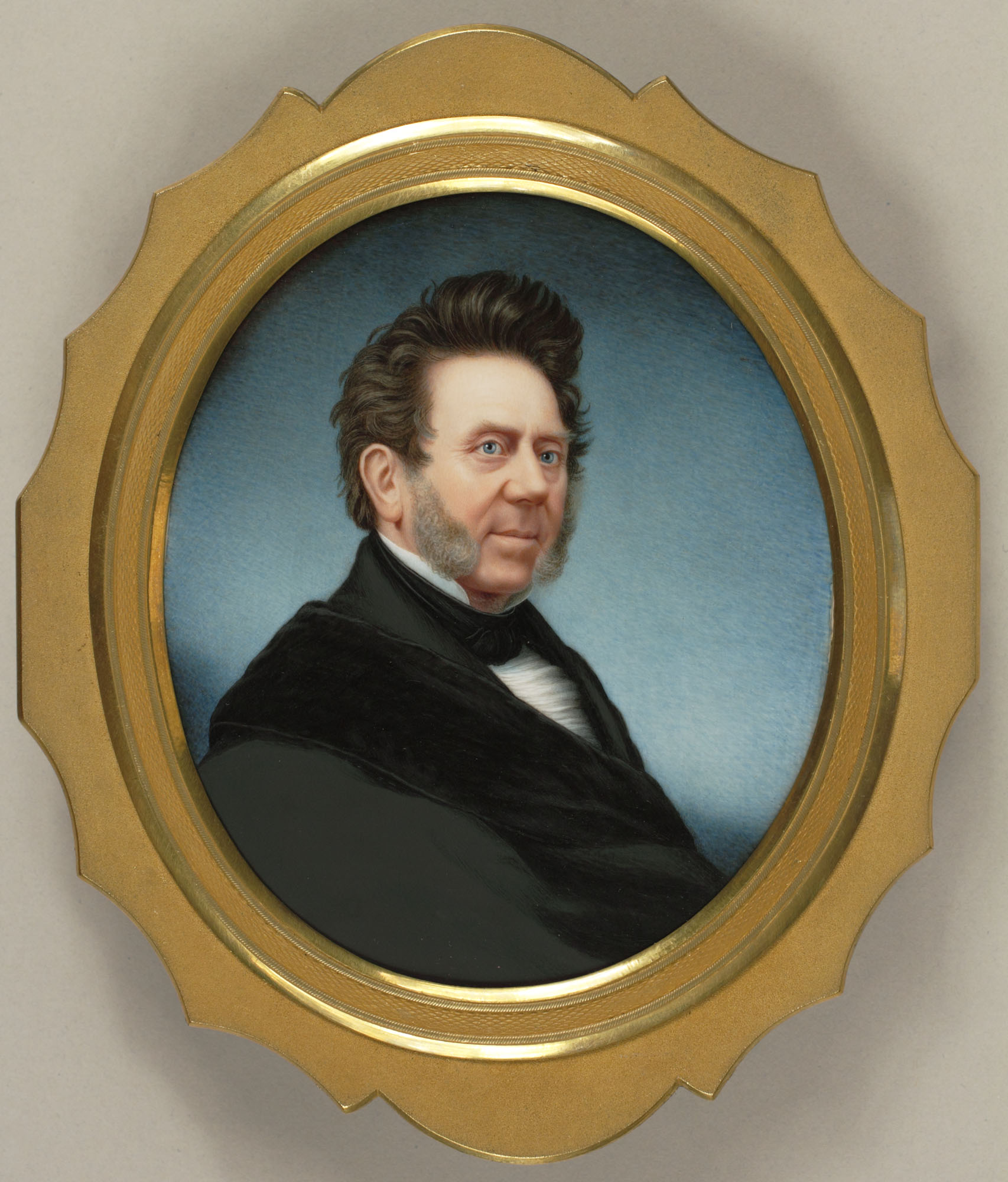

Member of the New York State Senate from Third District (Class 2)
- In office January 1, 1833 – December 31, 1836
- Preceded by: Lewis Eaton
- Succeeded by: Noadiah Johnson

Member of the New York State Assembly from Albany County
- In office January 1, 1830 – December 31, 1831 Serving with Samuel S. Lush, Erastus Williams (1830); Wheeler Watson, Peter W. Winne (1831)
- Preceded by: James D. Gardner, Moses Stanton, Chandler Starr
- Succeeded by: Abijah C. Disbrow, Philip Lennebacker, William Seymour

Personal details
- Born: December 22, 1788 Albany, New York
- Died: January 4, 1876 (aged 87) Albany, New York
- Party: Jacksonian
- Spouse(s): Mary Sanford Gansevoort (m. 1833-1841, her death); Susan Lansing Gansevoort (m. 1843-1874, her death)
- Children: Henry Sanford Gansevoort; Catherine Gansevoort
- Parent(s): Peter Gansevoort; Catherine Van Schaick
- Relatives: Leonard Gansevoort (uncle); Abraham Lansing (son-in-law); Herman Melville (nephew); Guert Gansevoort (nephew)
- Education: Williams College; Litchfield Law School
- Alma mater: College of New Jersey
- Occupation: Attorney

Peter Gansevoort (December 22, 1788 – January 4, 1876) was an American politician from New York.

== Early life ==
Peter Gansevoort was the son of Gen. Peter Gansevoort (1749–1812) and Catherine (née Van Schaick) Gansevoort. Leonard Gansevoort (1751–1810) was his uncle, and author Herman Melville (1819–1891) and Commodore Guert Gansevoort (1812–1868) were his nephews.

He attended Williams College from 1804 to 1805, graduated B.A. from the College of New Jersey in 1808. He studied law with Harmanus Bleecker, attended Litchfield Law School from 1808 to 1809, graduated M.A. from the College of New Jersey in 1811, was admitted to the bar in 1811, and practiced in Albany.

== Career ==
From 1817 to 1819, he was the private secretary of Gov. DeWitt Clinton. From 1819 to 1821, he served as the Judge Advocate General of the New York State Militia.

He was a member of the New York State Assembly (Albany Co.) in 1830 and 1831.

Gansevoort was a member of the New York State Senate (3rd D.) from 1833 to 1836, sitting in the 56th, 57th, 58th and 59th New York State Legislatures.

From 1843 to 1847, he was First Judge of the Albany County Court.

He was a director of the New York State Bank from about 1832 until his death; and a trustee of The Albany Academy from 1826 until his death, and Chairman of the Board of Trustees from 1856.

== Personal life ==
In 1833, he married Mary Sanford (1814–1841), a daughter of Chancellor Nathan Sandford, and they had four children, two of whom died in infancy, leaving two who survived into adulthood:

- Henry Sanford Gansevoort (1835–1871), a Union Army General
- Catherine Gansevoort, who married State Senator Abraham Lansing (a nephew of her stepmother) in 1873

After the death of his wife in 1841, he married Susan Lansing (1804–1874) in December 1843.

He died on January 4, 1876, and was buried at the Albany Rural Cemetery in Menands, New York.

== Sources ==
- The New York Civil List compiled by Franklin Benjamin Hough (pages 129ff, 141, 209f, 275 and 358; Weed, Parsons and Co., 1858)
- A Herman Melville Encyclopedia by Robert L. Gale (Greenwood Press, Westport CT, 1995; ISBN 0-313-29011-3; the Gansevoorts, pg. 149 to 159)

New York State Senate
Preceded by Lewis Eaton	New York State Senate; Third District (Class 2); 1833–1836	Succeeded by Noadiah Johnson
