= George H. Boughton =

American politician

George Hezekiah Boughton (July 31, 1792 – April 28, 1866) was an American politician.

== Life ==
He was born on July 31, 1792, in West Stockbridge, Massachusetts. The family removed to Canandaigua, New York in 1795. During the War of 1812, he fought in the Battle of Queenston Heights.

During the construction of the Erie Canal, he opened a supply store at a place where the canal was cut through a mountain ridge, and which became the village of Lockport. In 1822, he became the first Postmaster of Lockport. On December 19, 1827, he married Eliza Bates at Hopewell, New York.

He was an Anti-Masonic member of the New York State Senate (8th D.) from 1829 to 1830, sitting in the 52nd and 53rd New York State Legislatures.

In October 1839, he was appointed by Governor William H. Seward a Canal Appraiser. In February 1840, he was elected by the New York State Legislature a Canal Commissioner, and remained in office until February 1842 when the Democratic majority removed the Whig commissioners. From November 1852 to March 1853, he was again a Canal Appraiser.

He died on April 28, 1866, in Lockport, New York. He was buried at Glenwood Cemetery in Lockport.

== Sources ==
- The New York Civil List compiled by Franklin Benjamin Hough (pages 42, 43, 128 and 139; Weed, Parsons and Co., 1858)
- Obit in NYT on May 8, 1866
- History of Political Parties in the State of New-York by John Stilwell Jenkins (Alden & Markham, Auburn NY, 1846; page 358)

New York State Senate
Preceded by Charles H. Carroll	New York State Senate; Eighth District (Class 4); 1829 - 1830	Succeeded by Trumbull Cary
