= Ebenezer Ford =

British marine zoologist

Ebenezer "Ebb" Ford OBE FRSE (22 September 1890 – 14 October 1974), who also wrote under the pen-name Quibbon, was a British marine zoologist.

== Early life and education ==
Ebenezer Ford was born on 22 September 1890 in Hove, England, the son of George Horace Ford. His younger brother, Percy Ford, became an economist and was the first professor of economics at the University of Southampton.

Ford was educated at Varndean School and Brighton College for two years before going to Imperial College London to study Science under Clifford Dobell. He specialised in marine zoology. Ford did research as a Huxley Scholar and was awarded the Sarah Marshall Exhibition in 1913.

== Career ==
In 1913 Ford was given the post of assistant naturalist at the Plymouth Laboratory.

As with many of his generation, his plans were disrupted by the outbreak of the First World War. He first volunteered and joined the Sussex Yeomanry, but then applied for an officer's commission, and in July 1915 joined the Royal Fusiliers. He saw active service in France and was wounded at the Battle of Passchendaele in 1917.

In 1919, Ford returned to Plymouth to resume his role as assistant naturalist, and was immediately promoted to fisheries naturalist. Remaining in Plymouth, he eventually rose to be assistant director of the laboratory in 1935.

From 1924 to 1929 he conducted a major study of the British herring shoals. He was a strong supporter of the Sea-Fishing Industry Act of 1933.

His career was again interrupted by the Second World War during which, after a period in the Home Guard, he served in Air Intelligence in the Air Ministry in London starting in November 1941. In 1949, he left Plymouth to become Director of the Marine Station at Millport, in replacement of Richard Elmhirst.

He then became first full-time secretary of the Scottish Marine Biological Association.

Ford was also competent artist, and created several thousand "specimen drawings".

== Recognition and honours ==
In 1950 Ford was elected a fellow of the Royal Society of Edinburgh. His proposers were Maurice Yonge, Charles Wynford Parsons, Robert Campbell Garry, and Sir James Wilfred Cook.

He received the Order of the British Empire (OBE) on New Year's Day 1957 for services to marine science.

== Later life and death ==
Ford retired in March 1956 and returned to his native county of Sussex, naming his house "Keppel" after the Keppel pier at Millport.

He died at the King Edward VII Hospital, Midhurst, on 14 October 1974.

== Personal life ==
Ford's younger brother, Percy Ford, became an economist and was the first professor of economics at the University of Southampton.

He married Alice Gurr in August 1916. She died in 1950. They had one daughter, Joan.

== Publications ==
Ford wrote in the Fishing News magazine under the pen-name of "Quibbon".

- Nuclear division of the Limax Amoeba (1913)
- Statistical Methods for Research Workers (1925)
