= Robert Bogardus =

American politician

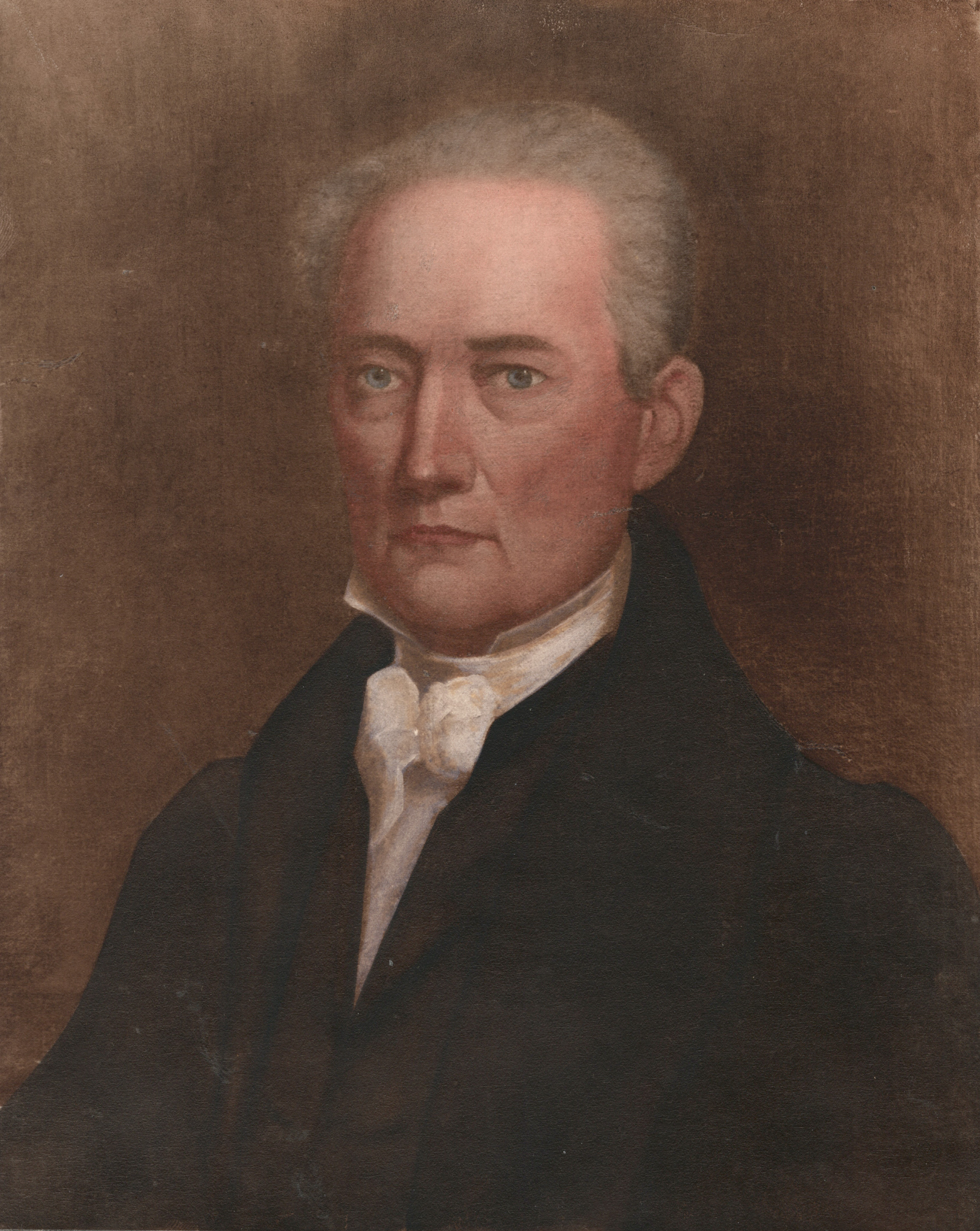

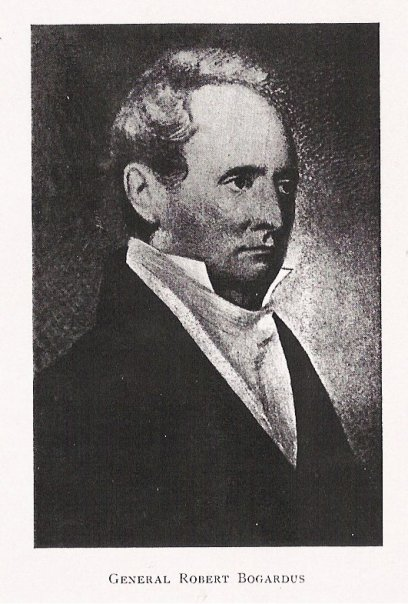

Robert Bogardus (May 22, 1771 "Possession House", St. John's Park, New York City – September 12, 1841 New York City) was an American lawyer and politician from New York. He was a lineal descendant of Dominie Everardus Bogardus.

== Life ==
He was the son of Lewis Bogardus (1738–1808) and Annie (Mills) Bogardus (b. 1745). In 1792, he married Maria Sabina Waldron (1774–1855), and they had ten children.

Robert Bogardus was a member of the New York State Assembly (New York Co.) in 1811.

He fought in the War of 1812, and in November 1812, as a lieutenant colonel, was placed in command of the Third Brigade of the New York Militia Infantry. From 1813 to 1815, as a colonel, he commanded the 41st U.S.Infantry Regiment. He was later promoted to general.

He was a member of the New York State Senate (1st D.) from 1827 to 1829, sitting in the 50th, 51st and 52nd New York State Legislatures. He resigned his seat on May 4, 1829.

His daughter Sarah Jay Bogardus (b. 1794) married Foxhall A. Parker (1788–1857), and their children were Foxhall A. Parker (1821–1879) and William Harwar Parker (1826–1896).

== Sources ==
- The New York Civil List compiled by Franklin Benjamin Hough (pages 126f, 138, 185 and 260; Weed, Parsons and Co., 1858)
- The Prominent Families of the United States of America ed. by Arthur Meredyth Burke (originally published London, 1908; reprinted Baltimore MD, 1991; ISBN 978-0-8063-1308-5 ; page 144)
- A Genealogical History of the Ancestors and Descendants of General Robert Bogardus by Alice Gray Lovejoy (1927)

New York State Senate
Preceded by Jasper Ward	New York State Senate; First District (Class 4); 1827–1829	Succeeded by Jonathan S. Conklin
