= Samuel Sherwood (New York politician) =

American politician

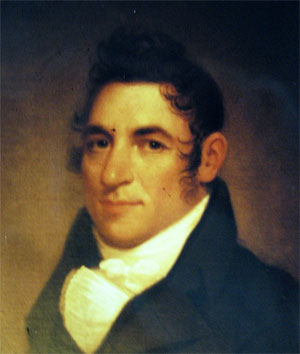

Member of the U.S. House of Representatives from New York's 8th district
- In office March 4, 1813 – March 3, 1815
- Preceded by: Benjamin Pond
- Succeeded by: John Adams

Personal details
- Born: April 24, 1779 Kingsbury, New York, U.S.
- Died: October 31, 1862 (aged 83) New York City, U.S.
- Resting place: Woodland Cemetery, Delhi, New York
- Party: Federalist
- Spouse: Laura Bostwick (m. 1814; died 1862)

Samuel Sherwood (April 24, 1779 – October 31, 1862) was a United States representative from New York.

== Early life ==
Sherwood was born in Kingsbury, New York on April 24, 1779. At the time of his firth, his father was in command of a body of levies stationed at Fort Stanwix, now Rome.

He completed preparatory studies, and then began the study of law at the age of fifteen in the office of a prominent lawyer, Conrad Elmendorf of Kingston, having as a fellow student his friend the late Chief Justice Oakley. He moved to Delhi in 1798, where he continued his legal studies under Judge Ebenezer Foot.

== Career ==
He was admitted to the bar in 1800 and practiced in Delhi. Sherwood's home near the confluence of the West Branch Delaware River and Little Delaware River included a farm, and he was also involved in local business ventures, including a tannery and a grist mill.

In addition to his legal and business interests, Sherwood was active in the New York Militia as paymaster of Colonel Elisha Butler's regiment.

Sherwood was elected as a Federalist to the Thirteenth Congress (March 4, 1813 to March 3, 1815). He was not a candidate for renomination to the Fourteenth Congress and resumed the practice of his profession in Delhi.

In 1830 Sherwood moved to New York City, where he continued to practice law until retiring in 1858.

== Personal life ==
In 1814, Sherwood married Laura Bostwick (1790–1863) of New Milford, Connecticut.

Sherwood died in New York City on October 31, 1862. He was buried at Woodland Cemetery in Delhi.

U.S. House of Representatives
Preceded by Benjamin Pond	Member of the U.S. House of Representatives from New York's 8th congressional district 1813–1815	Succeeded by John Adams
