= George R. Davis (New York politician) =

American lawyer and politician

George Rex Davis (1788 Johnstown, then in Montgomery County, now in Fulton County, New York – June 24, 1867 Troy, Rensselaer County, New York) was an American lawyer and politician from New York. He was Speaker of the New York State Assembly in 1831 and 1843.

== Biography ==
He removed to Hoosick Falls, New York, and opened a tailor shop there. Later he studied law, and was admitted to the bar about 1810, and commenced practice there. He married Amy Lottridge (1793–1856), and their only daughter was Charlotte M. Davis who married Thaddeus W. Patchen in 1837.

In 1814, one hundred and twenty-eight volunteers under George R. Davis joined the State Militia, and all marched from Troy to Plattsburgh, but the Battle of Plattsburgh had been fought before they reached there.

When he became a judge of the Court of Common Pleas for Rensselaer County in 1829, he moved to the county seat Troy.

In 1830, under the provisions of the Safety Fund Law, he was appointed Bank Commissioner, and served five terms until 1840.

He was a member from Rensselaer County of the New York State Assembly in 1819, 1830, 1831, 1842 and 1843; and was Speaker in 1831 and 1843.

He was First Judge of the Rensselaer County Court from 1838 to 1847.

He died drowning. His granddaughters Mary and Caroline Patchen, aged 23 and 20, also died drowning, in a shipwreck on Lake Erie in June 1868.

Political offices
Preceded by Erastus Root	Speaker of the New York State Assembly; 1831	Succeeded by Charles Ludlow Livingston
Preceded by Levi S. Chatfield	Speaker of the New York State Assembly; 1843	Succeeded by Elisha Litchfield
