= William H. Noble =

American politician (1788–1850)

William Henry Noble
- Born: September 22, 1788; New Milford, Connecticut
- Died: February 5, 1850 (aged 61)
- Education: Limited education
- Known for: Local political offices, service in the New York Militia, and business involvement
- Office: Member of the U.S. House of Representatives
- Political party: Democratic

William Henry Noble (September 22, 1788 – February 5, 1850) was an American businessman and politician who served one term as a U.S. representative from New York from 1837 to 1839.

== Biography ==
Born in New Milford, Connecticut, received a limited education, and became a farmer and tanner. Noble moved to Ballston Spa, where he was an active in the Episcopal church and served as a vestryman.

=== Business ===
He later resided in Ira, Cato, Rochester, and Auburn. He served in local offices, including school board member and school inspector in Ira, postmaster in Cato, town supervisor of Auburn, and collector of canal tolls in Montezuma. In addition, he was active in local businesses, including serving on the board of directors of the Cayuga County National Bank.

=== Militia ===
He served as member of the New York State Assembly from 1828 to 1830. He was also an officer in the New York Militia, and attained the rank of lieutenant colonel as second-in-command of the 167th Infantry Regiment, a unit of the 7th Brigade, 21st Division.

=== Congress ===
Noble was elected as a Democrat to the Twenty-fifth Congress (March 4, 1837 – March 3, 1839). He was an unsuccessful candidate for reelection in 1838 to the Twenty-sixth Congress.

=== Later career and death ===
He served as inspector of Auburn Prison from 1843 to 1845. He died in Rochester, New York on February 5, 1850. He was buried at Cato-Meridian Cemetery in Ira.

U.S. House of Representatives
Preceded by Ulysses F. Doubleday	Member of the U.S. House of Representatives from New York's 24th congressional district March 4, 1837 – March 3, 1839	Succeeded by Christopher Morgan
