= Nathaniel S. Benton =

American politician (1792–1869)

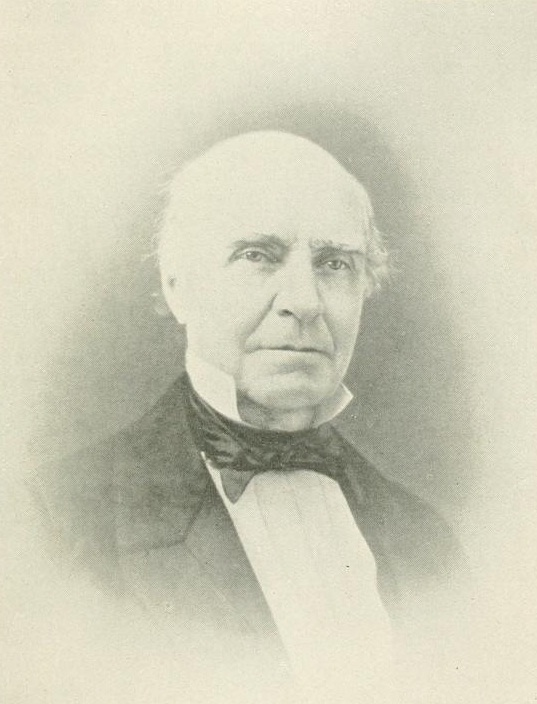
Nathaniel S. Benton

Nathaniel Soley Benton (February 19, 1792 – June 29, 1869) was an American politician from New York.

== Life ==
He was born on February 19, 1792, in Westmoreland, New Hampshire. At the age of four, his family moved to Fryeburg, Maine, where he attended Fryeburg Academy and studied under Daniel Webster. He was engaged in teaching during the winter of 1812, but, filled with a sense of patriotism by the War of 1812, he enlisted in the 34th Regiment of the United States Army. He rose rapidly to the rank of adjutant general, and also served as Judge-Advocate at two courts-martial in 1814 at Plattsburgh, New York.

After the war, he studied law at his uncle's law office in Orford, New Hampshire, and in early 1816 moved to Little Falls, New York, where he continued his studies with George H. Feeter. In 1817, he was made Justice of the Peace, and was admitted to the bar in 1819. About 1820, having a desire to see something of the west, he made a tour of Pennsylvania, Virginia, Kentucky, Tennessee, Missouri, Illinois, Michigan, Indiana, and Ohio.

He was Surrogate of Herkimer County from 1821 to 1828, a member of the New York State Senate (5th D.) from 1828 to 1831, United States Attorney for the Northern District of New York from 1831 to 1841, and Secretary of State of New York from 1845 to 1847. He was a member of the Democratic Party until 1855, when he became a member of the American Party, and ran in 1858 for Lieutenant Governor of New York with Lorenzo Burrows on the American ticket. Afterwards he joined the Republican Party, supporting both of Abraham Lincoln's elections. He was auditor of the canal department from 1855 to 1868.

He died on June 29, 1869, in Little Falls, New York; and was interred in the Church Street Cemetery there.

New York State Senate
Preceded by Perley Keyes	New York State Senate; Fifth District (Class 1); 1828–1831	Succeeded by Robert Lansing
Legal offices
Preceded by Samuel Beardsley	U.S. Attorney for the Northern District of New York; 1831–1841	Succeeded by Joshua A. Spencer
Political offices
Preceded by Samuel Young	New York Secretary of State; 1845–1847	Succeeded by Christopher Morgan
