= 47th New York State Legislature =

New York state legislative session

←	46th	48th	→
- The Old State Capitol (1879)

Overview
- Legislative body: New York State Legislature
- Jurisdiction: New York, United States
- Term: January 1 – December 31, 1824

Senate
- Members: 32
- President: Lt. Gov. Erastus Root (Buckt.)
- Party control: Bucktail (17-14)

Assembly
- Members: 128
- Speaker: Richard Goodell (Buckt.)
- Party control: Bucktail

Sessions
- 1st: January 7 – April 12, 1824
- 2nd: August 2 – 6, 1824
- 3rd: November 2 – 27, 1824

The 47th New York State Legislature, consisting of the New York State Senate and the New York State Assembly, met from January 6 to November 27, 1824, during the second year of Joseph C. Yates's governorship, in Albany.

== Background ==
Under the provisions of the New York Constitution of 1821, 32 Senators were elected on general tickets in eight senatorial districts for four-year terms. They were divided into four classes, and every year eight Senate seats came up for election. Assemblymen were elected countywide on general tickets to a one-year term, the whole Assembly being renewed annually.

Jacob Sutherland declined to take his seat in the State Senate at the beginning of the previous session, leaving a vacancy in the Third District. State Senator Joseph Spencer died on May 2, 1823, leaving a vacancy in the Eighth District.

The previous session had been dominated by the Bucktails faction of the Democratic-Republican Party. The opposing Democratic-Republican faction, the "Clintonians" had almost disappeared after DeWitt Clinton decided not to run in the New York gubernatorial election, 1822. In 1823, a major controversy arose concerning the presidential succession. Martin Van Buren supported William H. Crawford and was sure to get New York's presidential votes by electing a Bucktail majority to the Legislature which at that time elected the presidential electors. This scheme was opposed not only by the Clintonians, but also by a very large part of the Bucktails, and led to a breakdown of party lines. The Anti-Crawford factions, favoring at this time John Quincy Adams, Henry Clay, Andrew Jackson and John C. Calhoun as possible presidential candidates, proposed to have the presidential electors elected by the people in districts, similar to the congressional elections, and became known as the "People's Party". The rump Bucktail faction (which followed Van Buren) was called the "Regency Party" by their opponents, a reference to the Albany Regency.

== Elections ==
The State election was held from November 3 to 5, 1823. David Gardiner (1st D.), William Nelson (2nd D.), Jacob Haight (3rd D.), Silas Wright Jr. (4th D.), Perley Keyes (5th D.), Latham A. Burrows (6th D.), Jedediah Morgan (7th D.) and Assemblyman James McCall (8th D.) were elected to full terms in the Senate. Senator Edward P. Livingston (3rd D.) and Assemblyman John Bowman (8th D.) were elected to fill the vacancies. Gardiner and Haight were elected on the People's Party ticket; Nelson and Burrows were elected unopposed but joined the People's Party during the session; Morgan sided also with the People's Party; and the other five were Bucktails and sided with the Regency Party.

== Sessions ==
The Legislature met for the regular session at the Old State Capitol in Albany on January 6, 1824, and adjourned on April 24.

On January 5, pro-Crawford and anti-Crawford Bucktail assemblymen caucused together to nominate a candidate for Speaker. Richard Goodell (Buckt.) defeated James Tallmadge Jr. (PP) with a vote of 70 to 40, and was elected the next day with 116 votes out of 125.

On January 6, Henry Wheaton (PP) announced in the Assembly that he would later propose a bill to have the people elect the presidential electors. Azariah C. Flagg (Buckt.) then offered a resolution to refer the question to a Committee of Nine. This was opposed by the People's Party men, denouncing it as a maneuver to defeat the change, but the resolution was carried after much debate by a vote of 76 to 47. Appointed to the committee were Assemblymen Flagg, Van Alstyne, Bellinger, Brown, Bowker, Ells (all six pro-Crawford), Mullett, Finch and Wheaton (anti-Crawford).

After several meetings, the Committee of Nine reported a bill giving the power to choose presidential electors to the people, but requiring a majority of all the votes to be elected, although in New York history all elections have been, and still are, made by plurality. With at least four strong candidates, it was evident that no choice would be made in this manner. The proposed bill provided for choosing presidential electors by the Legislature if there was no choice by the people, which confirmed Wheaton's original suspicion. Isaac Finch proposed an amendment, to elect by plurality instead, which was lost with a vote of 52 to 64.

On February 4, the bill was passed in the Assembly, to elect by popular vote requiring a majority, but without provisions how to proceed in case of no choice. The bill then went to the Senate and was referred to a select committee chaired by Charles E. Dudley (Buckt.). After some time without action by the committee, Isaac Ogden offered a resolution, requiring the committee to report, which was postponed indefinitely by a vote of 21 to nine. After some time, the committee submitted a written report, concluding that "it would not be expedient" to pass this bill, or any other, to change the mode of choosing presidential electors.

On March 10, this report was debated in the Senate. John Cramer moved to change the original conclusion, saying that "it was expedient to pass a law, at the present session of the Legislature," giving to the people the choice of presidential electors by general ticket. A resolution to amend this with "and by a plurality of votes" was lost with a vote of 14 to 17. Then Cramer's resolution was carried with a vote of 16 to 15. However, after much debate, Edward P. Livingston offered a resolution to postpone the bill until the first Monday in November, which was carried by a vote of 17 to 14.

On April 3, a caucus of Bucktail legislators, consisting of the Regency men and a minority of People's men, nominated Samuel Young (pro-Clay) for Governor. Young was proposed by the People's men, and was nominated in opposition to Gov. Yates, who had been proposed by the Regency men for re-election. However, considering the enormous impopularity of the rejection of the new electoral law, and Yates being identified with these proceedings, most Regency men were sure that Yates had no chance to be re-elected, and were willing to abandon him in favor of any other candidate. Young had been originally considered to be put on the People's Party ticket, but this was dropped by the majority of the People's men after he was nominated by the Regency Party.

On April 7, the People's Party legislators held a caucus, of which Isaac Ogden was Chairman and David Gardiner Secretary. They protested against the rejection of the electoral law, and against the choice of nominees for Governor and Lieutenant Governor by legislative caucus. They issued a call for a State convention of the People's Party, to be held on September 21 at Utica to make the nominations.

On April 9, at a meeting in New York City, of which Ex-Gov. Morgan Lewis was Chairman and Cadwallader D. Colden Secretary, nominated Andrew Jackson for U.S. president.

On April 24, John Bowman submitted in the Senate a resolution for the removal of DeWitt Clinton from the Erie Canal Commission, which was carried with only three contrary votes (Cramer, Morgan and McIntyre). The resolution then went to the Assembly and was carried by a vote of 64 to 34. Most People's men voted for the removal, while some Regency men did not. The plan, hatched by the Regency, was to effect a breach between the Clintonians and the anti-Crawford Bucktails who together would have constituted a majority. However, the scheme backfired, since the removal created a great wave of indignation throughout the State. James Tallmadge Jr. (PP), who at the time was expected to be nominated for Governor by the Clintonians, voted for the removal and thus was dropped from consideration. Instead, DeWitt Clinton himself was proposed to run, and thus be vindicated.

On June 2, Gov. Yates issued a call for a special session of the Legislature to convene on August 2, to reconsider the enactment of a new electoral law.

On August 2, the Legislature met for a special session. Before the governor's message could be read, Byram Green offered a resolution in the Senate to censure Gov. Yates for having called this session. Azariah C. Flagg offered a resolution in the Assembly saying that the special session was unwarranted which was carried. After some debate, the Legislature adjourned on August 6 without any action taken.

On September 21, a State convention "in favor of a new electoral law", consisting of about 30 People's Party men and the remainder Clintonians, met at Utica with 122 delegates present. Ex-Gov. John Tayler (Clint.) was Chairman; Alexander Coffin (PP), of Hudson, was Vice-Chairman; and Samuel Stevens (PP) was Secretary.

On September 22, DeWitt Clinton was nominated for Governor with a large majority, and Tallmadge was unanimously nominated for Lieutenant Governor. The People's Party men then walked out, reconvened elsewhere chaired by Alexander Coffin, and repudiated the nomination of Clinton but vowed support for the election of Tallmadge as Lt. Gov.

On November 2, the Legislature met again, to elect presidential electors; and adjourned on November 27.

On November 3, the Legislature appointed Abraham Keyser Jr. to succeed Benjamin Knower as New York State Treasurer.

On November 3, a caucus of Bucktail legislators consisting of both Regency and People's men, was held to nominate electors. The meeting was chaired by Lt. Gov. Erastus Root who directed that those members, who had participated in the meeting of April 7 which called the Utica convention, be omitted from the roll call. This was opposed by these members and the meeting broke up in confusion without any action taken.

On November 10, the Senate nominated Crawford electors with a vote of 17 (the same who voted for the postponement of the electoral law) against 7 for the Clay ticket and 7 for the Adams ticket. In the Assembly, on the first ballot the Adams ticket had 50 votes, the Crawford ticket 43 and the Clay ticket 32. The Adams and the Clay men then combined and nominated a joint ticket of some electors who would vote for Adams and some who would vote for Clay.

On November 11, on the first joint ballot of the Legislature, 32 Adams-Clay electors were chosen, there being no choice of the other four due to three blank ballots. On the second joint ballot, 4 Crawford electors were chosen.

The 36 electors chosen were: Nathan Thompson, Darius Bentley, Micah Brooks, Pierre A. Barker, Joseph Sibley, Timothy H. Porter, Samuel Russell, Marinus Willett, Ebenezer Sage, Richard Blauvelt, Abraham Stagg, John Drake, James Drake, Isaac Sutherland (of Dutchess Co.), William Walsh, Alexander J. Coffin, Benjamin Smith, Elisha Dorr, William Townsend, Thomas Lawyer, Edward B. Crandall, Samuel Hicks, Edward Savage, Benjamin Mooers, Chester Patterson, Phinehas Coon, Azariah Smith, Eleazer Barnum, Solomon St. John, Elisha B. Strong, Clark Crandall, Isaac Sutherland (of Genesee Co.), John Lansing Jr., Benjamin Bailey, Samuel Smith and Henry Cady. Porter and Sage did not attend the meeting of the electoral college, and John Tayler and Willam Mann were appointed to fill the vacancies. They cast 26 votes for John Quincy Adams, 5 for William H. Crawford, 4 for Henry Clay and 1 for Andrew Jackson for president; and 29 votes for John C. Calhoun, and 7 for Nathan Sanford for vice president.

== State Senate ==
=== Districts ===
- The First District (4 seats) consisted of Kings, New York, Queens, Richmond and Suffolk counties.
- The Second District (4 seats) consisted of Dutchess, Orange, Putnam, Rockland, Sullivan, Ulster and Westchester counties.
- The Third District (4 seats) consisted of Albany, Columbia, Greene, Rensselaer, Schenectady and Schoharie counties.
- The Fourth District (4 seats) consisted of Clinton, Essex, Franklin, Hamilton, Montgomery, St. Lawrence, Saratoga, Warren and Washington counties.
- The Fifth District (4 seats) consisted of Herkimer, Jefferson, Lewis, Madison, Oneida and Oswego counties.
- The Sixth District (4 seats) consisted of Broome, Chenango, Cortland, Delaware, Otsego, Tioga and Tompkins counties.
- The Seventh District (4 seats) consisted of Cayuga, Onondaga, Ontario, Seneca, Wayne and Yates counties.
- The Eighth District (4 seats) consisted of Allegany, Cattaraugus, Chautauqua, Erie, Genesee, Livingston, Monroe, Niagara and Steuben counties.
Note: There are now 62 counties in the State of New York. The counties which are not mentioned in this list had not yet been established, or sufficiently organized, the area being included in one or more of the abovementioned counties.

=== Members ===
The asterisk (*) denotes members of the previous Legislature who continued in office as members of this Legislature. John Bowman and James McCall changed from the Assembly to the Senate.

The party affiliations follow the vote on the postponement of the election bill on March 10, 1824, and the nomination of Crawford electors, which were clear party votes.

District	Senators	Term left	Party	Notes
First	Walter Bowne*	1 year	Dem.-Rep./Bucktail	
First	John Lefferts*	2 years	Dem.-Rep./Bucktail	
First	Jasper Ward*	3 years	Dem.-Rep./Bucktail	
First	David Gardiner	4 years	People's Party	
Second	John Sudam*	1 year	Dem.-Rep./Bucktail	
Second	Stephen Thorn*	2 years	People's Party	
Second	James Burt*	3 years	People's Party	
Second	William Nelson	4 years	People's Party	
Third	Edward P. Livingston*	1 year	Dem.-Rep./Bucktail	elected to fill vacancy, in place of Jacob Sutherland
Third	Charles E. Dudley*	2 years	Dem.-Rep./Bucktail	also Mayor of Albany
Third	James Mallory*	3 years	Dem.-Rep./Bucktail	
Third	Jacob Haight	4 years	People's Party	
Fourth	Melancton Wheeler*	1 year	People's Party	
Fourth	John Cramer*	2 years	People's Party	
Fourth	Archibald McIntyre*	3 years	People's Party	
Fourth	Silas Wright Jr.	4 years	Dem.-Rep./Bucktail	until January 21, 1824, also Surrogate of St. Lawrence County
Fifth	Alvin Bronson*	1 year	Dem.-Rep./Bucktail	
Fifth	Thomas Greenly*	2 years	People's Party	
Fifth	Sherman Wooster*	3 years	Dem.-Rep./Bucktail	
Fifth	Perley Keyes	4 years	Dem.-Rep./Bucktail	
Sixth	Farrand Stranahan*	1 year	Dem.-Rep./Bucktail	
Sixth	Tilly Lynde*	2 years	People's Party	
Sixth	Isaac Ogden*	3 years	People's Party	
Sixth	Latham A. Burrows	4 years	People's Party	
Seventh	Byram Green*	1 year	Dem.-Rep./Bucktail	
Seventh	Jesse Clark*	2 years	People's Party	
Seventh	Jonas Earll Jr.*	3 years	Dem.-Rep./Bucktail	
Seventh	Jedediah Morgan	4 years	People's Party	
Eighth	David Eason*	1 year	Dem.-Rep./Bucktail	
Eighth	Heman J. Redfield*	2 years	Dem.-Rep./Bucktail	also D.A. of Genesee Co.
Eighth	John Bowman*	3 years	Dem.-Rep./Bucktail	elected to fill vacancy, in place of Joseph Spencer
Eighth	James McCall*	4 years	Dem.-Rep./Bucktail	

=== Employees ===
- Clerk: John F. Bacon

== State Assembly ==
=== Districts ===
- Albany County (3 seats)
- Allegany County (1 seat)
- Broome County (1 seat)
- Cattaraugus County (1 seat)
- Cayuga County (4 seats)
- Chautauqua County (1 seat)
- Chenango County (3 seats)
- Clinton County (1 seat)
- Columbia County (3 seats)
- Cortland County (2 seats)
- Delaware County (2 seats)
- Dutchess County (4 seats)
- Erie County (1 seat)
- Essex County (1 seat)
- Franklin County (1 seat)
- Genesee County (4 seats)
- Greene County (2 seats)
- Hamilton and Montgomery counties (4 seats)
- Herkimer County (3 seats)
- Jefferson County (3 seats)
- Kings County (1 seat)
- Lewis County (1 seat)
- Livingston County (2 seats)
- Madison County (3 seats)
- Monroe County (3 seats)
- The City and County of New York (10 seats)
- Niagara County (1 seat)
- Oneida County (5 seats)
- Onondaga County (4 seats)
- Ontario County (3 seats)
- Orange County (4 seats)
- Oswego County (1 seat)
- Otsego County (4 seats)
- Putnam County (1 seat)
- Queens County (2 seats)
- Rensselaer County (4 seats)
- Richmond County (1 seat)
- Rockland County (1 seat)
- St. Lawrence County (1 seat)
- Saratoga County (3 seats)
- Schenectady County (1 seat)
- Schoharie County (2 seats)
- Seneca County (2 seats)
- Steuben County (2 seats)
- Suffolk County (2 seats)
- Sullivan County (1 seat)
- Tioga County (2 seats)
- Tompkins County (2 seats)
- Ulster County (3 seats)
- Warren County (1 seat)
- Washington (4 seats)
- Wayne County (2 seats)
- Westchester County (3 seats)
- Yates County (1 seat)
Note: There are now 62 counties in the State of New York. The counties which are not mentioned in this list had not yet been established, or sufficiently organized, the area being included in one or more of the abovementioned counties.

=== Assemblymen ===
The asterisk (*) denotes members of the previous Legislature who continued as members of this Legislature. Silas Bowker changed from the Senate to the Assembly.

District	Assemblymen	Party	Notes
Albany	Archibald Stephens		
Albany	John Stilwell		
Albany	Jesse Wood		
Allegany	Lazarus S. Rathbun	Dem.-Rep./Bucktail	
Broome	Thomas G. Waterman	Dem.-Rep./Bucktail	
Cattaraugus	Phineas Spencer	Dem.-Rep./Bucktail	
Cayuga	Josiah Bevier*		
Cayuga	Silas Bowker*	Dem.-Rep./Bucktail	
Cayuga	Augustus F. Ferris		
Cayuga	Asahel Fitch		
Chautauqua	James Mullett Jr.*	Dem.-Rep./Bucktail	
Chenango	John F. Hubbard		
Chenango	John Latham		
Chenango	Daniel Root		
Clinton	Azariah C. Flagg*	Dem.-Rep./Bucktail	
Columbia	Thomas Bay		contested by Walter C. Livingston who was seated in January 1824
Columbia	John King		
Columbia	Joseph D. Monell		
Cortland	William Barto Jr.		
Cortland	Matthias Cook		
Delaware	James Ells	Dem.-Rep./Bucktail	
Delaware	Peter Pine		
Dutchess	John Klapp		
Dutchess	Alfred S. Pell		
Dutchess	James Tallmadge Jr.	People's Party	in November 1824, elected Lt. Gov. of New York
Dutchess	Gilbert Thorne		
Erie	Samuel Wilkeson	People's Party	
Essex	Isaac Finch	People's Party	
Franklin	George B. R. Gove		
Genesee	Shubeal Dunham		
Genesee	Oran Follett		
Genesee	James Ganson		
Genesee	Horace S. Turner		
Greene	Caleb Coffin	Dem.-Rep./Bucktail	
Greene	Edward Daley	Dem.-Rep./Bucktail	
Hamilton and Montgomery	Henry Cunningham	People's Party	
Hamilton and Montgomery	Peter C. Fox		
Hamilton and Montgomery	Peter Smith		
Hamilton and Montgomery	Francis H. Van Beuren		
Herkimer	Christopher P. Bellinger	Dem.-Rep./Bucktail	
Herkimer	Caleb Budlong		
Herkimer	John Graves		
Jefferson	Richard Goodell*	Dem.-Rep./Bucktail	elected Speaker
Jefferson	John Howe		
Jefferson	John Stewart		
Kings	William Furman	People's Party	
Lewis	Caleb Lyon		
Livingston	George Hosmer	Dem.-Rep./Bucktail	
Livingston	George Smith	Dem.-Rep./Bucktail	
Madison	Joseph Clark		
Madison	Edward Hudson		
Madison	Thomas Spencer		
Monroe	Peter Price		
Monroe	Major H. Smith		
Monroe	Enos Stone		
New York	James Benedict	People's Party	
New York	Clarkson Crolius	People's Party	
New York	Jacob Drake	People's Party	
New York	Samuel S. Gardiner*	People's Party	
New York	Thomas Hyatt*	People's Party	
New York	John Morss*	People's Party	
New York	Isaac Pierson	People's Party	
New York	David Seaman	People's Party	
New York	Charles Town	People's Party	
New York	Henry Wheaton	People's Party	also Reporter of the U.S. Supreme Court; left the Assembly a few days after February 4 to attend the session of the Supreme Court in Washington, D.C.; resumed his seat on April 1
Niagara	Daniel Washburn	Dem.-Rep./Bucktail	
Oneida	Joseph Allen		
Oneida	Apollos Cooper		
Oneida	Joseph Grant		
Oneida	John Ruger	Dem.-Rep./Bucktail	
Oneida	Henry Wager*		
Onondaga	Timothy Barber*		
Onondaga	Samuel L. Edwards*	Dem.-Rep./Bucktail	
Onondaga	George Pettit		
Onondaga	Matthew Van Vleck		
Ontario	Daniel Ashley		
Ontario	Gideon Pitts		
Ontario	Bowen Whiting	Dem.-Rep./Bucktail	
Orange	Benjamin Dunning		
Orange	James Finch Jr.		
Orange	Leonard Smith		
Orange	Samuel J. Wilkin	People's Party	
Oswego	Hastings Curtiss		
Otsego	John Blakeley	People's Party	
Otsego	Samuel Russell		
Otsego	David Smith		
Otsego	George W. Stillman		
Putnam	Stephen C. Barnum		
Queens	William Jones	People's Party	
Queens	Thomas Tredwell	People's Party	
Rensselaer	Caleb Carr		
Rensselaer	Henry Dubois		
Rensselaer	Martin Van Alstyne	Dem.-Rep./Bucktail	
Rensselaer	Stephen Warren*		
Richmond	Henry Perine		
Rockland	Peter S. Van Orden	People's Party	
St. Lawrence	Nathaniel F. Winslow*		
Saratoga	Isaac Gere		
Saratoga	James McCrea		
Saratoga	Jeremy Rockwell		
Schenectady	Isaac Riggs	People's Party	
Schoharie	Marvin Judd		
Schoharie	John Stryker		
Seneca	Jonas Seely*		
Seneca	Erastus Woodworth		
Steuben	George McClure*		
Steuben	Grattan H. Wheeler		
Suffolk	Hugh Halsey		
Suffolk	Josiah Smith		
Sullivan	Peter Miller		
Tioga	Grant B. Baldwin		
Tioga	Gamaliel H. Barstow	People's Party	
Tompkins	Peter Hager 2d*	Dem.-Rep./Bucktail	
Tompkins	Nicoll Halsey		
Ulster	James C. DeWitt		
Ulster	Joseph Jansen		
Ulster	John C. Tillotson		
Warren	Dudley Farlin		
Washington	David Campbell		
Washington	John Crary	People's Party	
Washington	Silas D. Kellogg		
Washington	Ezra Smith	People's Party	
Wayne	James Dickson		previously a member from Seneca Co.
Wayne	Russell Whipple	Dem.-Rep./Bucktail	
Westchester	Nehemiah Brown Jr.*	Dem.-Rep./Bucktail	
Westchester	Benjamin Ferris		
Westchester	Niles Frost		
Yates	Aaron Remer*		previously a member from Ontario Co.

=== Employees ===
- Clerk: Edward Livingston
- Sergeant-at-Arms: James D. Wasson
- Doorkeeper: James Myers
- Assistant Doorkeeper: William Seely

== Sources ==
- The New York Civil List compiled by Franklin Benjamin Hough (Weed, Parsons and Co., 1858) [see pg. 109 for Senate districts; pg. 125 for senators; pg. 148f for Assembly districts; pg. 200f for assemblymen; pg. 326 for presidential election]
- The History of Political Parties in the State of New-York, from the Ratification of the Federal Constitution to 1840 by Jabez D. Hammond (4th ed., Vol. 2, Phinney & Co., Buffalo, 1850; pg. 125 to 180)
- Election result Assembly, Allegany Co. at project "A New Nation Votes", compiled by Phil Lampi, hosted by Tufts University Digital Library
- Election result Assembly, Cattaraugus Co. at project "A New Nation Votes"
- Election result Assembly, Chautauqua Co. at project "A New Nation Votes"
- Election result Assembly, Clinton Co. at project "A New Nation Votes"
- Election result Assembly, Erie Co. at project "A New Nation Votes"
- Election result Assembly, Essex Co. at project "A New Nation Votes"
- Election result Assembly, Greene Co. at project "A New Nation Votes"
- Election result Assembly, Kings Co. at project "A New Nation Votes"
- Election result Assembly, Livingston Co. at project "A New Nation Votes"
- Election result Assembly, Monroe Co. at project "A New Nation Votes"
- Election result Assembly, Niagara Co. at project "A New Nation Votes"
- Election result Assembly, Queens Co. at project "A New Nation Votes"
- Election result Assembly, Richmond Co. at project "A New Nation Votes"
- Election result Assembly, Rockland Co. at project "A New Nation Votes"
- Election result Assembly, Schoharie Co. at project "A New Nation Votes"
- Election result Assembly, Seneca Co. at project "A New Nation Votes"
- Election result Assembly, Tioga Co. at project "A New Nation Votes" [gives wrong party affiliations]
- Election result Assembly, Ulster Co. at project "A New Nation Votes"
- Election result Assembly, Wayne Co. at project "A New Nation Votes"
- Partial election result Senate, First D. at project "A New Nation Votes" [gives only votes of Kings Co.]
- Partial election result Senate, Second D. at project "A New Nation Votes" [gives only votes of Ulster Co.]
- Partial election result Senate, Third D. at project "A New Nation Votes" [gives only votes of Greene and Schoharie Co.]
- Partial election result Senate, Fourth D. at project "A New Nation Votes" [gives only votes from Clinton and Essex Co.]
- Partial election result Senate, Sixth D. at project "A New Nation Votes" [gives only votes of Tioga Co.]
- Partial election result Senate, Seventh D. at project "A New Nation Votes" [gives only votes of Seneca and Wayne Co.]
- Partial election result Senate, Eighth D. at project "A New Nation Votes" [omits votes from Genesee and Steuben Co.]
- Election result Caucus, Speaker at project "A New Nation Votes"
- Election result Assembly, Speaker at project "A New Nation Votes"
