= 48th New York State Legislature =

New York state legislative session

←	47th	49th	→
- The Old State Capitol (1879)

Overview
- Legislative body: New York State Legislature
- Jurisdiction: New York, United States
- Term: January 1 – December 31, 1825

Senate
- Members: 32
- President: Lt. Gov. James Tallmadge, Jr. (PP)
- Party control: Bucktail plurality (13-10-9)

Assembly
- Members: 128
- Speaker: Clarkson Crolius (PP)
- Party control: Clintonian

Sessions
- 1st: January 4 – April 21, 1825

The 48th New York State Legislature, consisting of the New York State Senate and the New York State Assembly, met from January 4 to April 21, 1825, during the first year of DeWitt Clinton's second tenure as Governor of New York, in Albany.

== Background ==
Under the provisions of the New York Constitution of 1821, 32 Senators were elected on general tickets in eight senatorial districts for four-year terms. They were divided into four classes, and every year eight Senate seats came up for election. Assemblymen were elected countywide on general tickets to a one-year term, the whole Assembly being renewed annually.

The previous session had been dominated by the controversy about the presidential succession, and the question how to choose presidential electors. Party lines broke down when Martin Van Buren tried to have the "Bucktails" faction of the Democratic-Republican Party support William H. Crawford for U.S. president. A large part of the Bucktails favored John Quincy Adams, Henry Clay, Andrew Jackson and John C. Calhoun as possible presidential candidates, and proposed to have the presidential electors elected by the people in districts, similar to the congressional elections. The Anti-Crawford factions became known as the "People's Party", and they joined forces with the "Clintonians" (supporters of DeWitt Clinton, opposed to the Bucktails). The rump Bucktail faction (which followed Van Buren) was called the "Regency Party" by their opponents, a reference to the Albany Regency.

On April 3, a caucus of Bucktail legislators, consisting of the Regency men and a minority of People's men, nominated Canal Commissioner Samuel Young for Governor; and Lt. Gov. Erastus Root for re-election.

On September 22, a State convention "in favor of a new electoral law", consisting of about 30 People's men and about 90 Clintonians, nominated Ex-Gov. DeWitt Clinton for Governor, and Assemblyman James Tallmadge, Jr. (PP) for Lieutenant Governor.

== Elections ==
The State election was held from November 1 to 3, 1824. DeWitt Clinton and James Tallmadge Jr. were elected in a landslide.

Cadwallader D. Colden (1st D.), Wells Lake (2nd D.), Richard McMichael (3rd D.), George Brayton (5th D.), Stukely Ellsworth (6th D.), John C. Spencer (7th D.); and Assemblymen John Crary (4th D.) and Samuel Wilkeson (8th D.) were elected to the Senate. Lake and Ellsworth were Bucktails, the other six were Clintonians.

== Sessions ==
The Legislature met for the regular session at the Old State Capitol in Albany on January 4, 1825, and adjourned on April 21.

Clarkson Crolius (PP) was elected Speaker with 109 votes out of 122.

In his message to the Legislature, Gov. Clinton recommended to enact that presidential electors be chosen by the people, by general ticket and a plurality of votes.

On February 1, the Legislature failed to elect a successor to U.S. Senator Rufus King, and the seat became vacant on March 4, 1825.

On February 16, the Legislature elected Gamaliel H. Barstow (Clint.) to succeed Abraham Keyser, Jr. (Buckt.) as New York State Treasurer.

== State Senate ==
=== Districts ===
- The First District (4 seats) consisted of Kings, New York, Queens, Richmond and Suffolk counties.
- The Second District (4 seats) consisted of Dutchess, Orange, Putnam, Rockland, Sullivan, Ulster and Westchester counties.
- The Third District (4 seats) consisted of Albany, Columbia, Greene, Rensselaer, Schenectady and Schoharie counties.
- The Fourth District (4 seats) consisted of Clinton, Essex, Franklin, Hamilton, Montgomery, St. Lawrence, Saratoga, Warren and Washington counties.
- The Fifth District (4 seats) consisted of Herkimer, Jefferson, Lewis, Madison, Oneida and Oswego counties.
- The Sixth District (4 seats) consisted of Broome, Chenango, Cortland, Delaware, Otsego, Tioga and Tompkins counties.
- The Seventh District (4 seats) consisted of Cayuga, Onondaga, Ontario, Seneca, Wayne and Yates counties.
- The Eighth District (4 seats) consisted of Allegany, Cattaraugus, Chautauqua, Erie, Genesee, Livingston, Monroe, Niagara and Steuben counties.
Note: There are now 62 counties in the State of New York. The counties which are not mentioned in this list had not yet been established, or sufficiently organized, the area being included in one or more of the abovementioned counties.

=== Members ===
The asterisk (*) denotes members of the previous Legislature who continued in office as members of this Legislature. John Crary and Samuel Wilkeson changed from the Assembly to the Senate.

The party affiliations follow the vote for a U.S. senator on February 1 which showed that there was no majority; and that Clintonians and People's men, although having combined for the election against the Bucktails, were opposed to each other.

District	Senators	Term left	Party	Notes
First	John Lefferts*	1 year	Dem.-Rep./Bucktail	
First	Jasper Ward*	2 years	Dem.-Rep./Bucktail	
First	David Gardiner*	3 years	People's Party	
First	Cadwallader D. Colden	4 years	Clintonian	
Second	Stephen Thorn*	1 year	People's Party	
Second	James Burt*	2 years	People's Party	
Second	William Nelson*	3 years	People's Party	
Second	Wells Lake	4 years	Dem.-Rep./Bucktail	
Third	Charles E. Dudley*	1 year	Dem.-Rep./Bucktail	
Third	James Mallory*	2 years	Dem.-Rep./Bucktail	
Third	Jacob Haight*	3 years	People's Party	
Third	Richard McMichael	4 years	Clintonian	
Fourth	John Cramer*	1 year	Clintonian	
Fourth	Archibald McIntyre*	2 years	Clintonian	
Fourth	Silas Wright, Jr.*	3 years	Dem.-Rep./Bucktail	
Fourth	John Crary*	4 years	Clintonian	
Fifth	Thomas Greenly*	1 year	People's Party	
Fifth	Sherman Wooster*	2 years	Dem.-Rep./Bucktail	
Fifth	Perley Keyes*	3 years	Dem.-Rep./Bucktail	
Fifth	George Brayton	4 years	Clintonian	
Sixth	Tilly Lynde*	1 years	People's Party	
Sixth	Isaac Ogden*	2 years	People's Party	
Sixth	Latham A. Burrows*	3 years	People's Party	
Sixth	Stukely Ellsworth	4 years	Dem.-Rep./Bucktail	
Seventh	Jesse Clark*	1 year	Clintonian	
Seventh	Jonas Earll, Jr.*	2 years	Dem.-Rep./Bucktail	
Seventh	Jedediah Morgan*	3 years	Clintonian	
Seventh	John C. Spencer	4 years	Clintonian	
Eighth	Heman J. Redfield*	1 year	Dem.-Rep./Bucktail	also D.A. of Genesee Co.
Eighth	John Bowman*	2 years	Dem.-Rep./Bucktail	
Eighth	James McCall*	3 years	Dem.-Rep./Bucktail	
Eighth	Samuel Wilkeson*	4 years	Clintonian	

=== Employees ===
- Clerk: John F. Bacon

== State Assembly ==
=== Districts ===
- Albany County (3 seats)
- Allegany County (1 seat)
- Broome County (1 seat)
- Cattaraugus County (1 seat)
- Cayuga County (4 seats)
- Chautauqua County (1 seat)
- Chenango County (3 seats)
- Clinton County (1 seat)
- Columbia County (3 seats)
- Cortland County (2 seats)
- Delaware County (2 seats)
- Dutchess County (4 seats)
- Erie County (1 seat)
- Essex County (1 seat)
- Franklin County (1 seat)
- Genesee County (4 seats)
- Greene County (2 seats)
- Hamilton and Montgomery counties (4 seats)
- Herkimer County (3 seats)
- Jefferson County (3 seats)
- Kings County (1 seat)
- Lewis County (1 seat)
- Livingston County (2 seats)
- Madison County (3 seats)
- Monroe County (3 seats)
- The City and County of New York (10 seats)
- Niagara County (1 seat)
- Oneida County (5 seats)
- Onondaga County (4 seats)
- Ontario County (3 seats)
- Orange County (4 seats)
- Oswego County (1 seat)
- Otsego County (4 seats)
- Putnam County (1 seat)
- Queens County (2 seats)
- Rensselaer County (4 seats)
- Richmond County (1 seat)
- Rockland County (1 seat)
- St. Lawrence County (1 seat)
- Saratoga County (3 seats)
- Schenectady County (1 seat)
- Schoharie County (2 seats)
- Seneca County (2 seats)
- Steuben County (2 seats)
- Suffolk County (2 seats)
- Sullivan County (1 seat)
- Tioga County (2 seats)
- Tompkins County (2 seats)
- Ulster County (3 seats)
- Warren County (1 seat)
- Washington (4 seats)
- Wayne County (2 seats)
- Westchester County (3 seats)
- Yates County (1 seat)
Note: There are now 62 counties in the State of New York. The counties which are not mentioned in this list had not yet been established, or sufficiently organized, the area being included in one or more of the abovementioned counties.

=== Assemblymen ===
The asterisk (*) denotes members of the previous Legislature who continued as members of this Legislature. Silas Bowker changed from the Senate to the Assembly.

District	Assemblymen	Party	Notes
Albany	George Batterman		
Albany	Samuel S. Lush		
Albany	Stephen Willes		
Allegany	Lazarus S. Rathbun*	Dem.-Rep./Bucktail	
Broome	Briant Stoddard		
Cattaraugus	Daniel Hodges		
Cayuga	Elijah Devoe		
Cayuga	Roswell Enos		
Cayuga	John W. Hulbert		
Cayuga	Ephraim C. Marsh		
Chautauqua	Nathan Mixer		
Chenango	Russel Case		
Chenango	Charles Medbury		
Chenango	Robert Monell		
Clinton	Josiah Fisk		
Columbia	Ambrose L. Jordan	Clintonian	also Recorder of the City of Hudson
Columbia	Joseph Lord		
Columbia	Killian Miller		
Cortland	James Chatterton		
Cortland	Josiah Hart		unsuccessfully contested by Jabez B. Phelps
Delaware	Jabez Bostwick		
Delaware	Herman I. Quackenboss		
Dutchess	John Armstrong Jr.		
Dutchess	Eli Angevine		
Dutchess	Enos Hopkins		
Dutchess	Gilbert Thorne		
Erie	Calvin Fillmore		
Essex	William Smith		
Franklin	Asa Hascall		
Genesee	Jeremiah Brown		
Genesee	Fitch Chipman		
Genesee	Shubeal Dunham*		
Genesee	Gaius B. Rich		
Greene	Gilbert Bedell	Dem.-Rep./Bucktail	
Greene	Alvin Bushnell	Dem.-Rep./Bucktail	
Hamilton and Montgomery	Henry Cunningham*	Clintonian	
Hamilton and Montgomery	Samuel Jackson		
Hamilton and Montgomery	Alexander St. John		
Hamilton and Montgomery	Peter Smith*		
Herkimer	Samuel Dexter Jr.		
Herkimer	Warner Folts		
Herkimer	Jacob Wire		
Jefferson	John B. Esselstyn	Clintonian	
Jefferson	Richard Goodell*	Dem.-Rep./Bucktail	
Jefferson	George White	C/PP	
Kings	William Furman*	C/PP	
Lewis	Amos Buck Jr.		
Livingston	James Faulkner	Clintonian	
Livingston	Robert McKay	Clintonian	previously a member from Genesee Co.
Madison	Elias P. Benjamin		
Madison	Nehemiah Huntington		
Madison	James Nye		
Monroe	Gustavus Clark		
Monroe	Henry Fellows		previously a member from Ontario Co.
Monroe	Thurlow Weed		
New York	James Benedict*	People's Party	
New York	Gilbert Coutant	Dem.-Rep./Bucktail	
New York	Clarkson Crolius*	People's Party	elected Speaker
New York	Maltby Gelston	Dem.-Rep./Bucktail	
New York	Samuel L. Gouverneur	People's Party	
New York	John Morss*	People's Party	
New York	Jonathan E. Robinson	Dem.-Rep./Bucktail	
New York	David Seaman*	People's Party	
New York	Ira B. Wheeler	People's Party	
New York	George Zabriskie	People's Party	
Niagara	Daniel Washburn*	Dem.-Rep./Bucktail	
Oneida	Joseph Kirkland		
Oneida	David Pierson		
Oneida	Israel Stoddard		
Oneida	Broughton White		
Oneida	Samuel Woodworth		previously a member from Herkimer Co.
Onondaga	Erastus Barber		
Onondaga	Moses Kinne		
Onondaga	James R. Lawrence		
Onondaga	James Pettit		
Ontario	Claudius V. Boughton	Clintonian	
Ontario	Gideon Pitts*		
Ontario	Bowen Whiting*	Dem.-Rep./Bucktail	
Orange	William Finn		
Orange	Nathaniel P. Hill		
Orange	Joseph McLaughlin		
Orange	Samuel J. Wilkin*	Clintonian	
Oswego	Chester Hayden		
Otsego	Henry Barber		
Otsego	Isaac Hayes		
Otsego	Oliver Judd		
Otsego	John Woodbury		
Putnam	David Knapp		
Queens	William Jones*	People's Party	
Queens	Thomas Tredwell*	People's Party	
Rensselaer	John Carpenter		
Rensselaer	Jacob C. Lansing		
Rensselaer	Fenner Palmer		
Rensselaer	Jacob G. Vanderheyden		
Richmond	Harmanus Garretson		
Rockland	Abraham Gurnee	People's Party	
St. Lawrence	Jacob A. Vanden Heuvel		
Saratoga	Nicholas B. Doe		
Saratoga	Alpheus Goodrich		
Saratoga	Philip Schuyler		
Schenectady	John S. Vrooman		
Schoharie	Joseph I. Borst	Dem.-Rep./Bucktail	
Schoharie	Freeman Stanton	Clintonian	
Seneca	James De Mott	People's Party	
Seneca	Daniel Rhoad	Dem.-Rep./Bucktail	
Steuben	John Kennedy		
Steuben	James McBurney		
Suffolk	David Hedges Jr.	Dem.-Rep./Bucktail	
Suffolk	Joshua Smith	Dem.-Rep./Bucktail	
Sullivan	John Hall Jr.		
Tioga	Charles Pumpelly		
Tioga	Samuel Winton		
Tompkins	Joshua North		
Tompkins	Jared Patchin		
Ulster	James Cockburn	Clintonian	
Ulster	Jacobus Hardenburgh	Clintonian	
Ulster	Jacob J. Hasbrouck	Clintonian	
Warren	William Cook		
Washington	David Campbell*		
Washington	Lemuel Hastings		
Washington	Ezra Smith*	C/PP	
Washington	Samuel Stevens	People's Party	
Wayne	William H. Adams	Clintonian	
Wayne	Enoch Morse	Clintonian	
Westchester	Jeremiah Anderson	Dem.-Rep./Bucktail	
Westchester	Thaddeus Crane	Dem.-Rep./Bucktail	
Westchester	Joseph Scofield	Dem.-Rep./Bucktail	
Yates	Philip Robinson		

=== Employees ===
- Clerk: Horatio Merchant
- Sergeant-at-Arms: Daniel Shields
- Doorkeeper: Chester Stebbins
- Assistant Doorkeeper: Conrad Moore

== Sources ==
- The New York Civil List compiled by Franklin Benjamin Hough (Weed, Parsons and Co., 1858) [see pg. 109 for Senate districts; pg. 126 for senators; pg. 148f for Assembly districts; pg. 202f for assemblymen]
- The History of Political Parties in the State of New-York, from the Ratification of the Federal Constitution to 1840 by Jabez D. Hammond (4th ed., Vol. 2, Phinney & Co., Buffalo, 1850; pg. 175 to 205)
- Election result Assembly, Albany Co. at project "A New Nation Votes", compiled by Phil Lampi, hosted by Tufts University Digital Library
- Election result Assembly, Cayuga Co. at project "A New Nation Votes"
- Election result Assembly, Chautauqua Co. at project "A New Nation Votes"
- Election result Assembly, Chenango Co. at project "A New Nation Votes"
- Election result Assembly, Clinton Co. at project "A New Nation Votes"
- Election result Assembly, Erie Co. at project "A New Nation Votes"
- Election result Assembly, Greene Co. at project "A New Nation Votes"
- Election result Assembly, Jefferson Co. at project "A New Nation Votes"
- Election result Assembly, Kings Co. at project "A New Nation Votes"
- Election result Assembly, Livingston Co. at project "A New Nation Votes"
- Election result Assembly, Monroe Co. at project "A New Nation Votes"
- Election result Assembly, Niagara Co. at project "A New Nation Votes"
- Election result Assembly, Queens Co. at project "A New Nation Votes"
- Election result Assembly, Richmond Co. at project "A New Nation Votes"
- Election result Assembly, Rockland Co. at project "A New Nation Votes"
- Election result Assembly, Schoharie Co. at project "A New Nation Votes"
- Election result Assembly, Seneca Co. at project "A New Nation Votes"
- Election result Assembly, Suffolk Co. at project "A New Nation Votes"
- Election result Assembly, Ulster Co. at project "A New Nation Votes"
- Election result Assembly, Wayne Co. at project "A New Nation Votes"
- Election result Assembly, Westchester Co. at project "A New Nation Votes"
- Partial election result Senate, First D. at project "A New Nation Votes" [gives only votes of Kings, Richmond and Suffolk Co.]
- Partial election result Senate, Second D. at project "A New Nation Votes" [gives only votes of Rockland, Ulster and Westchester Co.]
- Partial election result Senate, Third D. at project "A New Nation Votes" [gives only votes of Albany, Greene and Schoharie Co.]
- Partial election result Senate, Fourth D. at project "A New Nation Votes" [gives only votes from Clinton Co.]
- Partial election result Senate, Sixth D. at project "A New Nation Votes" [gives only votes of Chenango Co.]
- Partial election result Senate, Seventh D. at project "A New Nation Votes" [gives only votes of Cayuga, Seneca and Wayne Co.]
- Partial election result Senate, Eighth D. at project "A New Nation Votes" [gives only votes from Chautauqua, Erie, Livingston, Monroe and Niagara Co.]
