= 50th New York State Legislature =

New York state legislative session

| ← | 49th | 51st | → |
- The Old State Capitol (1879)

Overview
- Legislative body: New York State Legislature
- Jurisdiction: New York, United States
- Term: January 1 – December 31, 1827

Senate
- Members: 32
- President: Lt. Gov. Nathaniel Pitcher (Buckt.)
- Party control: Bucktail

Assembly
- Members: 128
- Speaker: Erastus Root (Buckt.)
- Party control: Bucktail

Sessions
- 1st: January 2 – April 17, 1827
- 2nd: September 11 – December 4, 1827

The 50th New York State Legislature, consisting of the New York State Senate and the New York State Assembly, met from January 2 to December 4, 1827, during the third year of DeWitt Clinton's second tenure as Governor of New York, in Albany.

== Background ==
Under the provisions of the New York Constitution of 1821, 32 Senators were elected on general tickets in eight senatorial districts for four-year terms. They were divided into four classes, and every year eight Senate seats came up for election. Assemblymen were elected countywide on general tickets to a one-year term, the whole Assembly being renewed annually.

On April 18, 1826, the Legislature amended the senatorial district apportionment: Delaware Co. was transferred from the 6th to the 2nd District; and Steuben Co. was transferred from the 8th to the 6th District. They also amended the Assembly district apportionment: Chautauqua, Erie, New York, St. Lawrence and Tompkins gained one seat each; and Hamilton/Montgomery, Orange, Queens, Ulster and Washington lost one seat each.

State Senator George Brayton resigned on April 18, 1826, leaving a vacancy in the Fifth District. State Senator Jedediah Morgan resigned due to ill health, leaving a vacancy in the Seventh District.

At this time, the Democratic-Republican Party was split into two factions: the "Bucktails" (led by U.S. Senator Martin Van Buren) and the "Clintonians" (supporters of Gov. DeWitt Clinton).

On September 21, 1826, the Clintonian state convention met at Utica; Pierre Van Cortlandt was Chairman; and Samuel Stevens and Simon G. Throop were Secretaries. The delegates nominated Gov. DeWitt Clinton for re-election; and Henry Huntington for lieutenant governor.

On October 4, 1826, the Bucktail state convention met at Herkimer; James L. Hogeboom was Chairman; and David E. Evans and Assembly Clerk Edward Livingston were Secretaries. The delegates nominated Circuit Judge William B. Rochester for governor; and Nathaniel Pitcher for lieutenant governor.

On September 11, 1826, began the affair surrounding the abduction, and probable murder, of William Morgan which led to the foundation of the Anti-Masonic Party in 1828.

== Elections ==
The State election was held from November 6 to 8, 1826. Gov. DeWitt Clinton was re-elected, and Nathaniel Pitcher was elected lieutenant governor; for the first time in state history, the governor and the lieutenant governor were elected from opposing tickets.

Robert Bogardus (1st D.), John McCarty (3rd D.), Duncan McMartin Jr. (4th D.), Truman Enos (5th D.), Thomas G. Waterman (6th D.), William M. Oliver (7th D.), Charles H. Carroll (8th D.); and Assemblyman Benjamin Woodward (2nd D.) were elected to full terms in the Senate. Charles Dayan (5th D.) and Victory Birdseye (7th D.) were elected to fill the vacancies. Bogardus and McMartin were Clintonians, the other eight were Bucktails.

== Sessions ==
The Legislature met for the regular session at the Old State Capitol in Albany on January 2, 1827, and adjourned on April 17.

Erastus Root (Buckt.) was elected Speaker with 74 votes against 33 for Francis Granger (Clint.).

On February 6, the Legislature re-elected U.S. Senator Martin Van Buren to a second term of six years.

On February 20, Abraham Keyser, Jr. was re-elected New York State Treasurer.

The Legislature met for a special session on September 11; and adjourned on December 4. This session was called to debate the report of the Board of Revisers of the State Statutes, originally appointed in 1824. At this time, the members of the Board were John Duer, Benjamin F. Butler and John C. Spencer.

The Legislature enacted that 34 presidential electors should be elected by popular ballot in districts (corresponding to the congressional districts), and these 34 then should co-opt two electors-at-large (to complete the number of electors which is the sum of congressmen and U.S. senators).

== State Senate ==
=== Districts ===
- The First District (4 seats) consisted of Kings, New York, Queens, Richmond and Suffolk counties.
- The Second District (4 seats) consisted of Delaware, Dutchess, Orange, Putnam, Rockland, Sullivan, Ulster and Westchester counties.
- The Third District (4 seats) consisted of Albany, Columbia, Greene, Rensselaer, Schenectady and Schoharie counties.
- The Fourth District (4 seats) consisted of Clinton, Essex, Franklin, Hamilton, Montgomery, St. Lawrence, Saratoga, Warren and Washington counties.
- The Fifth District (4 seats) consisted of Herkimer, Jefferson, Lewis, Madison, Oneida and Oswego counties.
- The Sixth District (4 seats) consisted of Broome, Chenango, Cortland, Otsego, Steuben, Tioga and Tompkins counties.
- The Seventh District (4 seats) consisted of Cayuga, Onondaga, Ontario, Seneca, Wayne and Yates counties.
- The Eighth District (4 seats) consisted of Allegany, Cattaraugus, Chautauqua, Erie, Genesee, Livingston, Monroe, Niagara and Orleans counties.
Note: There are now 62 counties in the State of New York. The counties which are not mentioned in this list had not yet been established, or sufficiently organized, the area being included in one or more of the abovementioned counties.

=== Members ===
The asterisk (*) denotes members of the previous Legislature who continued in office as members of this Legislature. Benjamin Woodward changed from the Assembly to the Senate.

| District | Senators | Term left | Party | Notes |
|---|---|---|---|---|
| First | David Gardiner* | 1 year | | |
| First | Cadwallader D. Colden* | 2 years | Clintonian | resigned on August 30, 1827 |
| First | Joshua Smith* | 3 years | Dem.-Rep./Bucktail | |
| First | Robert Bogardus | 4 years | Clintonian | |
| Second | William Nelson* | 1 year | | |
| Second | Wells Lake* | 2 years | Dem.-Rep./Bucktail | |
| Second | Peter R. Livingston* | 3 years | Dem.-Rep./Bucktail | |
| Second | Benjamin Woodward* | 4 years | Dem.-Rep./Bucktail | also Postmaster of Mount Hope |
| Third | Jacob Haight* | 1 year | | |
| Third | Richard McMichael* | 2 years | Clintonian | |
| Third | Ambrose L. Jordan* | 3 years | Clintonian | until October 1827 also Recorder of the City of Hudson |
| Third | John McCarty | 4 years | Dem.-Rep./Bucktail | |
| Fourth | Silas Wright, Jr.* | 1 year | Dem.-Rep./Bucktail | in November 1826, elected to the 20th U. S. Congress, and took his seat on December 3, 1827, thus vacating his seat in the Legislature |
| Fourth | John Crary* | 2 years | Clintonian | |
| Fourth | John L. Viele* | 3 years | Clintonian | |
| Fourth | Duncan McMartin Jr. | 4 years | Clintonian | |
| Fifth | Perley Keyes* | 1 year | Dem.-Rep./Bucktail | |
| Fifth | Charles Dayan | 2 years | Dem.-Rep./Bucktail | elected to fill vacancy, in place of George Brayton |
| Fifth | Charles Stebbins* | 3 years | Dem.-Rep./Bucktail | |
| Fifth | Truman Enos | 4 years | Dem.-Rep./Bucktail | |
| Sixth | Latham A. Burrows* | 1 year | | |
| Sixth | Stukely Ellsworth* | 2 years | Dem.-Rep./Bucktail | |
| Sixth | Peter Hager 2d* | 3 years | Dem.-Rep./Bucktail | |
| Sixth | Thomas G. Waterman | 4 years | Dem.-Rep./Bucktail | |
| Seventh | Victory Birdseye | 1 year | Dem.-Rep./Bucktail | elected to fill vacancy, in place of Jedediah Morgan; also D.A. of Onondaga Co. |
| Seventh | John C. Spencer* | 2 years | Clintonian | |
| Seventh | Truman Hart* | 3 years | Clintonian | |
| Seventh | William M. Oliver | 4 years | Dem.-Rep./Bucktail | also First Judge of the Yates County Court |
| Eighth | James McCall* | 1 year | Dem.-Rep./Bucktail | |
| Eighth | Samuel Wilkeson* | 2 years | Clintonian | |
| Eighth | Ethan B. Allen* | 3 years | Clintonian | |
| Eighth | Charles H. Carroll | 4 years | Dem.-Rep./Bucktail | also First Judge of the Livingston County Court |

=== Employees ===
- Clerk: John F. Bacon

== State Assembly ==
=== Districts ===
- Albany County (3 seats)
- Allegany County (1 seat)
- Broome County (1 seat)
- Cattaraugus County (1 seat)
- Cayuga County (4 seats)
- Chautauqua County (2 seats)
- Chenango County (3 seats)
- Clinton County (1 seat)
- Columbia County (3 seats)
- Cortland County (2 seats)
- Delaware County (2 seats)
- Dutchess County (4 seats)
- Erie County (2 seats)
- Essex County (1 seat)
- Franklin County (1 seat)
- Genesee County (3 seats)
- Greene County (2 seats)
- Hamilton and Montgomery counties (3 seats)
- Herkimer County (3 seats)
- Jefferson County (3 seats)
- Kings County (1 seat)
- Lewis County (1 seat)
- Livingston County (2 seats)
- Madison County (3 seats)
- Monroe County (3 seats)
- The City and County of New York (11 seats)
- Niagara County (1 seat)
- Oneida County (5 seats)
- Onondaga County (4 seats)
- Ontario County (3 seats)
- Orange County (3 seats)
- Orleans County (1 seat)
- Oswego County (1 seat)
- Otsego County (4 seats)
- Putnam County (1 seat)
- Queens County (1 seat)
- Rensselaer County (4 seats)
- Richmond County (1 seat)
- Rockland County (1 seat)
- St. Lawrence County (2 seats)
- Saratoga County (3 seats)
- Schenectady County (1 seat)
- Schoharie County (2 seats)
- Seneca County (2 seats)
- Steuben County (2 seats)
- Suffolk County (2 seats)
- Sullivan County (1 seat)
- Tioga County (2 seats)
- Tompkins County (3 seats)
- Ulster County (2 seats)
- Warren County (1 seat)
- Washington (3 seats)
- Wayne County (2 seats)
- Westchester County (3 seats)
- Yates County (1 seat)
Note: There are now 62 counties in the State of New York. The counties which are not mentioned in this list had not yet been established, or sufficiently organized, the area being included in one or more of the abovementioned counties.

=== Assemblymen ===
The asterisk (*) denotes members of the previous Legislature who continued as members of this Legislature.

| District | Assemblymen | Party | Notes |
|---|---|---|---|
| Albany | Isaac Hamilton | | |
| Albany | John Haswell | | |
| Albany | Henry Stone | | |
| Allegany | Asa Lee Davidson | | |
| Broome | Peter Robinson* | | |
| Cattaraugus | John A. Bryan | Clintonian | unsuccessfully contested by James McGlashan |
| Cayuga | Gardner Kortright | | |
| Cayuga | Andrews Preston | | |
| Cayuga | Peter Yawger | | |
| Cayuga | vacant | | |
| Chautauqua | Samuel A. Brown | | |
| Chautauqua | Elial T. Foote* | | |
| Chenango | James Birdsall | Clintonian | |
| Chenango | Joseph Juliand | | |
| Chenango | Augustus C. Welch | | |
| Clinton | Bela Edgerton | | |
| Columbia | Jacob P. Mesick | | |
| Columbia | Isaac Mills | | |
| Columbia | Simon Rockefeller | | |
| Cortland | Cephas Comstock | | |
| Cortland | Nathan Dayton | | |
| Delaware | Erastus Root* | Dem.-Rep./Bucktail | elected Speaker |
| Delaware | John Thompson | | |
| Dutchess | Egbert Cary | | |
| Dutchess | Jacob C. Elmendorf | | |
| Dutchess | Samuel B. Halsey | | |
| Dutchess | Henry A. Livingston | | |
| Erie | David Burt | | |
| Erie | Oziel Smith | | |
| Essex | John Hoffnagle | Clintonian | |
| Franklin | James Campbell | | |
| Genesee | Josiah Churchill* | | |
| Genesee | Shubeal Dunham | | |
| Genesee | John B. Skinner | Dem.-Rep./Bucktail | |
| Greene | Perkins King | | |
| Greene | William Tuttle | | |
| Hamilton and Montgomery | Howland Fish | Clintonian | |
| Hamilton and Montgomery | Lawrence Gros | Dem.-Rep./Bucktail | |
| Hamilton and Montgomery | Nathaniel Westcott | | |
| Herkimer | Frederick P. Bellinger | | |
| Herkimer | Daniel C. Henderson | | |
| Herkimer | Richard Smith 2d | | |
| Jefferson | David W. Bucklin* | Dem.-Rep./Bucktail | |
| Jefferson | Alpheus S. Greene | | |
| Jefferson | Daniel Wardwell* | Dem.-Rep./Bucktail | |
| Kings | Clarence D. Sackett | | |
| Lewis | John W. Martin | | |
| Livingston | William H. Spencer* | | |
| Livingston | Felix Tracy | | |
| Madison | Sylvester Beecher | | |
| Madison | James B. Eldredge | | |
| Madison | Lemuel White | | |
| Monroe | Peter Price | | |
| Monroe | Abelard Reynolds | | |
| Monroe | Joseph Sibley | | |
| New York | Philip Brasher* | Dem.-Rep./Bucktail | |
| New York | Abraham Cargill | | |
| New York | Jonathan I. Coddington | | |
| New York | Gilbert Conant | | |
| New York | Isaac Minard* | Dem.-Rep./Bucktail | |
| New York | Joseph Piggot | | |
| New York | Jonathan E. Robinson* | Dem.-Rep./Bucktail | |
| New York | Alpheus Sherman* | Dem.-Rep./Bucktail | |
| New York | Lemuel Smith | | |
| New York | Thomas R. Smith | | |
| New York | Charles Town | | |
| Niagara | John Garnsey | | |
| Oneida | John Billings | | |
| Oneida | Winthrop H. Chandler | | |
| Oneida | Benjamin P. Johnson | | |
| Oneida | John Parker | | |
| Oneida | Theodore Sill* | Clintonian | |
| Onondaga | Chauncey Betts* | | |
| Onondaga | Aaron Burt | | |
| Onondaga | Charles Jackson | | |
| Onondaga | Daniel Moseley | Dem.-Rep./Bucktail | |
| Ontario | Francis Granger* | Clintonian | |
| Ontario | Lemuel Morse | | |
| Ontario | Nathan Parke | | |
| Orange | William W. Crawford | | |
| Orange | William Ecker | | |
| Orange | Nathaniel Jones | | |
| Orleans | Abraham Cantine | | |
| Oswego | Orris Hart | | |
| Otsego | William Campbell | | |
| Otsego | John Judson | | |
| Otsego | Sherman Page | | |
| Otsego | Samuel Starkweather | | |
| Putnam | Henry B. Cowles* | Dem.-Rep./Bucktail | |
| Queens | Thomas Tredwell* | | |
| Rensselaer | Jeremiah Dauchy | | |
| Rensselaer | John DeFreest Jr. | | |
| Rensselaer | Reuben Halsted | | |
| Rensselaer | Henry Platt | | |
| Richmond | Abraham Cole | | |
| Rockland | Levi Sherwood | | |
| St. Lawrence | Baron S. Doty* | Dem.-Rep./Bucktail | |
| St. Lawrence | Silvester Gilbert | | |
| Saratoga | Nicholas Emigh Jr. | | |
| Saratoga | Howell Gardner | | |
| Saratoga | John Gilchrist | | |
| Schenectady | Alonzo C. Paige | Dem.-Rep./Bucktail | |
| Schoharie | Samuel Baldwin | | |
| Schoharie | William Mann | | |
| Seneca | Daniel Rhoad | Dem.-Rep./Bucktail | |
| Seneca | Daniel Scott* | | |
| Steuben | Paul C. Cook | | |
| Steuben | George McClure | | |
| Suffolk | George L. Conklin | | |
| Suffolk | Samuel Strong | | |
| Sullivan | Hiram Bennett | | |
| Tioga | Gamaliel H. Barstow | Clintonian | |
| Tioga | David Williams | | |
| Tompkins | Nathan Benson* | | |
| Tompkins | Benjamin Jennings | | |
| Tompkins | John Sayler | | |
| Ulster | Jasper Cropsey | | |
| Ulster | Jacob Trumpbour | | |
| Warren | John Hay Jr. | Dem.-Rep./Bucktail | |
| Washington | John McDonald | | |
| Washington | Peter J. H. Myers | | |
| Washington | Samuel Stevens | Clintonian | |
| Wayne | Thomas Armstrong | | previously a member from Seneca Co.; also Supervisor of Butler |
| Wayne | Jonathan Boynton | | |
| Westchester | John Fisher | | |
| Westchester | Nathaniel Montross | | |
| Westchester | Joseph Scofield* | Dem.-Rep./Bucktail | |
| Yates | James C. Robinson | | |

=== Employees ===
- Clerk: Edward Livingston
- Sergeant-at-Arms: John C. Ellis
- Doorkeeper: William Seely
- Assistant Doorkeeper: James D. Scollard

== Sources ==
- The New York Civil List compiled by Franklin Benjamin Hough (Weed, Parsons and Co., 1858) [see pg. 109 and 441 for Senate districts; pg. 126f for senators; pg. 148f for Assembly districts; pg. 204ff for assemblymen]
- The History of Political Parties in the State of New-York, from the Ratification of the Federal Constitution to 1840 by Jabez D. Hammond (4th ed., Vol. 2, Phinney & Co., Buffalo, 1850; pg. 231 to 257)
