= 49th New York State Legislature =

New York state legislative session

←	48th	50th	→
- The Old State Capitol (1879)

Overview
- Legislative body: New York State Legislature
- Jurisdiction: New York, United States
- Term: January 1 – December 31, 1826

Senate
- Members: 32
- President: Lt. Gov. James Tallmadge, Jr.

Assembly
- Members: 128
- Speaker: Samuel Young (Buckt.)
- Party control: Bucktail (66-55)

Sessions
- 1st: January 3 – April 18, 1826

The 49th New York State Legislature, consisting of the New York State Senate and the New York State Assembly, met from January 3 to April 18, 1826, during the second year of DeWitt Clinton's second tenure as Governor of New York, in Albany.

== Background ==
Under the provisions of the New York Constitution of 1821, 32 Senators were elected on general tickets in eight senatorial districts for four-year terms. They were divided into four classes, and every year eight Senate seats came up for election. Assemblymen were elected countywide on general tickets to a one-year term, the whole Assembly being renewed annually.

In 1824, Orleans County was split from Genesee County, and was apportioned 1 seat in the Assembly, taken from Genesee.

After the controversy about the presidential succession had come to an end with the election of John Quincy Adams, the factions of the Democratic-Republican Party re-aligned into "Bucktails" (led by U.S. Senator Martin Van Buren) and "Clintonians" (supporters of Gov. DeWitt Clinton).

== Elections ==
The State election was held from November 7 to 9, 1825. Peter R. Livingston (2nd D.), John L. Viele (4th D.), Charles Stebbins (5th D.), Peter Hager 2d (6th D.), Truman Hart (7th D.), Ethan B. Allen (8th D.); and Assemblymen Joshua Smith (1st D.) and Ambrose L. Jordan (3rd D.) were elected to the Senate. Smith, Livingston, Stebbins and Hager were Bucktails, the other four were Clintonians.

== Sessions ==
The Legislature met for the regular session at the Old State Capitol in Albany on January 3, 1826, and adjourned on April 18.

Samuel Young (Buckt.) was elected Speaker with 65 votes against 54 for Ex-Mayor of New York City Stephen Allen who was a Bucktail but received the votes of the Clintonians. Edward Livingston was again elected Clerk of the Assembly with a vote of 66 to 55.

On January 3, State Senator Jasper Ward stated in the Senate that, during the recess of the Legislature, he had been falsely accused in the press of corrupt proceedings to get two bills passed during the previous session, and demanded an official investigation. The issue was referred to a Select Senate Committee.

On January 14, the Legislature elected Chancellor Nathan Sanford to the seat in the U.S. Senate which had been vacant since Rufus King's term expired on March 4, 1825.

On February 14, the Legislature re-elected State Comptroller William L. Marcy, Attorney General Samuel A. Talcott and Surveyor General Simeon De Witt; and elected Azariah C. Flagg to succeed John Van Ness Yates as Secretary of State; and Abraham Keyser, Jr. to succeed Gamaliel H. Barstow (Clint.) as New York State Treasurer. De Witt was a Clintonian, the other four elected officers were Bucktails.

On February 25, Silas Wright, Jr. submitted the Select Committee's report and offered a resolution that Jasper Ward be expelled from the Senate for corruption. Before the resolution was put to a vote, on March 1, Jasper Ward resigned his seat, and no further action was taken by the Senate.

On March 29, the State Road Commissioners, Jabez D. Hammond, Nathaniel Pitcher and George Morell, submitted their report on the project to build a road through the Southern Tier. Two routes were proposed: the "Northern Route" from Lake Erie via Bath, Ithaca, Unadilla, Delhi and Madison to Athens or Catskill; and the "Southern Route" from Lake Erie via Bath, Painted Post, New Town, Binghamton, Delaware Co., Sullivan Co. and Orange Co. to Nyack. The project was rejected by a vote of 48 to 50, and no State Road was built.

On April 18, the Legislature amended the senatorial district apportionment: Delaware Co. was transferred from the 6th to the 2nd District; and Steuben Co. was transferred from the 8th to the 6th District.

At this session, it was enacted that Justices of the Peace should henceforth be elected townwide by popular ballot, instead of being appointed.

== State Senate ==
=== Districts ===
- The First District (4 seats) consisted of Kings, New York, Queens, Richmond and Suffolk counties.
- The Second District (4 seats) consisted of Dutchess, Orange, Putnam, Rockland, Sullivan, Ulster and Westchester counties.
- The Third District (4 seats) consisted of Albany, Columbia, Greene, Rensselaer, Schenectady and Schoharie counties.
- The Fourth District (4 seats) consisted of Clinton, Essex, Franklin, Hamilton, Montgomery, St. Lawrence, Saratoga, Warren and Washington counties.
- The Fifth District (4 seats) consisted of Herkimer, Jefferson, Lewis, Madison, Oneida and Oswego counties.
- The Sixth District (4 seats) consisted of Broome, Chenango, Cortland, Delaware, Otsego, Tioga and Tompkins counties.
- The Seventh District (4 seats) consisted of Cayuga, Onondaga, Ontario, Seneca, Wayne and Yates counties.
- The Eighth District (4 seats) consisted of Allegany, Cattaraugus, Chautauqua, Erie, Genesee, Livingston, Monroe, Niagara, Orleans and Steuben counties.
Note: There are now 62 counties in the State of New York. The counties which are not mentioned in this list had not yet been established, or sufficiently organized, the area being included in one or more of the abovementioned counties.

=== Members ===
The asterisk (*) denotes members of the previous Legislature who continued in office as members of this Legislature. Joshua Smith and Ambrose L. Jordan changed from the Assembly to the Senate.

District	Senators	Term left	Party	Notes
First	Jasper Ward*	1 year	Dem.-Rep./Bucktail	resigned on March 1, 1826
First	David Gardiner*	2 years		
First	Cadwallader D. Colden*	3 years	Clintonian	
First	Joshua Smith*	4 years	Dem.-Rep./Bucktail	
Second	James Burt*	1 year		
Second	William Nelson*	2 years		
Second	Wells Lake*	3 years	Dem.-Rep./Bucktail	
Second	Peter R. Livingston	4 years	Dem.-Rep./Bucktail	
Third	James Mallory*	1 year	Dem.-Rep./Bucktail	
Third	Jacob Haight*	2 years		
Third	Richard McMichael*	3 years	Clintonian	
Third	Ambrose L. Jordan*	4 years	Clintonian	also Recorder of the City of Hudson
Fourth	Archibald McIntyre*	1 year	Clintonian	
Fourth	Silas Wright, Jr.*	2 years	Dem.-Rep./Bucktail	in November 1826, elected to the 20th U. S. Congress
Fourth	John Crary*	3 years	Clintonian	
Fourth	John L. Viele*	4 years	Clintonian	
Fifth	Sherman Wooster*	1 year	Dem.-Rep./Bucktail	
Fifth	Perley Keyes*	2 years	Dem.-Rep./Bucktail	
Fifth	George Brayton*	3 years	Clintonian	resigned on April 18, 1826
Fifth	Charles Stebbins	4 years	Dem.-Rep./Bucktail	
Sixth	Isaac Ogden*	1 year		
Sixth	Latham A. Burrows*	2 years		
Sixth	Stukely Ellsworth*	3 years	Dem.-Rep./Bucktail	
Sixth	Peter Hager 2d	4 years	Dem.-Rep./Bucktail	
Seventh	Jonas Earll, Jr.*	1 year	Dem.-Rep./Bucktail	in November 1826, elected to the 20th U. S. Congress
Seventh	Jedediah Morgan*	2 years	Clintonian	resigned his seat due to ill health, and died December 10, 1826
Seventh	John C. Spencer*	3 years	Clintonian	
Seventh	Truman Hart	4 years	Clintonian	
Eighth	John Bowman*	1 year	Dem.-Rep./Bucktail	
Eighth	James McCall*	2 years	Dem.-Rep./Bucktail	
Eighth	Samuel Wilkeson*	3 years	Clintonian	
Eighth	Ethan B. Allen	4 years	Clintonian	

=== Employees ===
- Clerk: John F. Bacon

== State Assembly ==
=== Districts ===
- Albany County (3 seats)
- Allegany County (1 seat)
- Broome County (1 seat)
- Cattaraugus County (1 seat)
- Cayuga County (4 seats)
- Chautauqua County (1 seat)
- Chenango County (3 seats)
- Clinton County (1 seat)
- Columbia County (3 seats)
- Cortland County (2 seats)
- Delaware County (2 seats)
- Dutchess County (4 seats)
- Erie County (1 seat)
- Essex County (1 seat)
- Franklin County (1 seat)
- Genesee County (3 seats)
- Greene County (2 seats)
- Hamilton and Montgomery counties (4 seats)
- Herkimer County (3 seats)
- Jefferson County (3 seats)
- Kings County (1 seat)
- Lewis County (1 seat)
- Livingston County (2 seats)
- Madison County (3 seats)
- Monroe County (3 seats)
- The City and County of New York (10 seats)
- Niagara County (1 seat)
- Oneida County (5 seats)
- Onondaga County (4 seats)
- Ontario County (3 seats)
- Orange County (4 seats)
- Orleans County (1 seat)
- Oswego County (1 seat)
- Otsego County (4 seats)
- Putnam County (1 seat)
- Queens County (2 seats)
- Rensselaer County (4 seats)
- Richmond County (1 seat)
- Rockland County (1 seat)
- St. Lawrence County (1 seat)
- Saratoga County (3 seats)
- Schenectady County (1 seat)
- Schoharie County (2 seats)
- Seneca County (2 seats)
- Steuben County (2 seats)
- Suffolk County (2 seats)
- Sullivan County (1 seat)
- Tioga County (2 seats)
- Tompkins County (2 seats)
- Ulster County (3 seats)
- Warren County (1 seat)
- Washington (4 seats)
- Wayne County (2 seats)
- Westchester County (3 seats)
- Yates County (1 seat)
Note: There are now 62 counties in the State of New York. The counties which are not mentioned in this list had not yet been established, or sufficiently organized, the area being included in one or more of the abovementioned counties.

=== Assemblymen ===
The asterisk (*) denotes members of the previous Legislature who continued as members of this Legislature. Tilly Lynde changed from the Senate to the Assembly.

District	Assemblymen	Party	Notes
Albany	Samuel S. Lush*	Clintonian	
Albany	Andrew Ten Eyck		
Albany	Malachi Whipple		
Allegany	George Williams		
Broome	Peter Robinson		
Cattaraugus	James McGlashan		
Cayuga	Eleazer Burnham		
Cayuga	Aaron Dennis		
Cayuga	Thatcher I. Ferris		
Cayuga	Campbell Waldo		
Chautauqua	Elial T. Foote		
Chenango	John C. Clark		contested by Tilly Lynde* who was seated on January 6
Chenango	Robert Monell*		
Chenango	John Tracy		also First Judge of the Chenango County Court
Clinton	Josiah Fisk*		
Columbia	Jonathan Hill		
Columbia	Adam I. Strevel		
Columbia	Aaron Vanderpoel	Clintonian	
Cortland	Augustus Donnelly		
Cortland	John Lynde		
Delaware	Erastus Root	Dem.-Rep./Bucktail	
Delaware	William Townsend		
Dutchess	Isaac R. Adriance		
Dutchess	Daniel D. Akin		
Dutchess	Martin Lawrence		
Dutchess	Thomas Taber II		contested by John Fowks Jr. who was seated on January 10
Erie	Reuben B. Babcock		
Essex	William Smith*		
Franklin	Asa Hascall*		
Genesee	Josiah Churchill	Dem.-Rep./Bucktail	
Genesee	David Scott	Clintonian	
Genesee	Phinehas Stanton	Dem.-Rep./Bucktail	
Greene	Addison Porter		
Greene	Williams Seaman		
Hamilton and Montgomery	Augustus Diefendorff		
Hamilton and Montgomery	John French		
Hamilton and Montgomery	Alexander Sheldon	Clintonian	contested by Matthias J. Bovee (D-R/B) who was seated on January 24
Hamilton and Montgomery	Abraham A. Van Horne		
Herkimer	Jonas Cleland		
Herkimer	Nicholas Schuyler Jr.		
Herkimer	Edmund Varney		
Jefferson	David W. Bucklin	Dem.-Rep./Bucktail	
Jefferson	Horatio Orvis		
Jefferson	Daniel Wardwell	Dem.-Rep./Bucktail	
Kings	William Furman*		
Lewis	Amos Miller		
Livingston	James Faulkner*	Clintonian	
Livingston	William H. Spencer		previously a member from Ontario Co.
Madison	Thomas Dibble		
Madison	Nehemiah Huntington*		
Madison	Jacob Ten Eyck		previously a member from Albany Co. ?
Monroe	Henry Fellows*		
Monroe	Isaac Lacey		
Monroe	Vincent Mathews		previously a member from Ontario Co.
New York	Stephen Allen	Dem.-Rep./Bucktail	
New York	Philip Brasher	Dem.-Rep./Bucktail	
New York	Francis Cooper	Dem.-Rep./Bucktail	
New York	Maltby Gelston*	Dem.-Rep./Bucktail	
New York	James Hall	Dem.-Rep./Bucktail	
New York	Elisha W. King	Clintonian	
New York	Isaac Minard	Dem.-Rep./Bucktail	
New York	Jonathan E. Robinson*	Dem.-Rep./Bucktail	
New York	Alpheus Sherman	Dem.-Rep./Bucktail	
New York	William A. Thompson	Dem.-Rep./Bucktail	
Niagara	William King		
Oneida	Aaron Barnes		
Oneida	Russell Clark		
Oneida	Laurens Hull		
Oneida	Theodore Sill	Clintonian	
Oneida	Israel Stoddard*		
Onondaga	Chauncey Betts		
Onondaga	John G. Forbes		
Onondaga	Freeborn G. Jewett		also Surrogate of Onondaga Co.
Onondaga	David Willard		
Ontario	Claudius V. Boughton*	Clintonian	
Ontario	Francis Granger	Clintonian	
Ontario	Gideon Pitts*		
Orange	Ogden Hoffman		
Orange	Hudson McFarlan		
Orange	Abraham Shultz		
Orange	Benjamin Woodward		
Orleans	Lathrop A. G. B. Grant		
Oswego	Henry Williams		
Otsego	Levi Beardsley	Dem.-Rep./Bucktail	
Otsego	William Fitch		
Otsego	Isaac Hayes*		
Otsego	David Tripp		
Putnam	Henry B. Cowles	Dem.-Rep./Bucktail	
Queens	William Jones*		
Queens	Thomas Tredwell*		
Rensselaer	Robert Collins		
Rensselaer	Augustus Filley		
Rensselaer	John F. Groesbeck		
Rensselaer	William Pierce		
Richmond	vacant		"no election"
Rockland	Abraham Gurnee*		contested by Edward Suffern who was seated on January 27
St. Lawrence	Baron S. Doty	Dem.-Rep./Bucktail	
Saratoga	David Benedict		
Saratoga	Thomas Dibble		
Saratoga	Samuel Young	Dem.-Rep./Bucktail	elected Speaker; also an Erie Canal Commissioner
Schenectady	Robert Sanders		
Schoharie	Robert Eldredge		
Schoharie	Martinus Mattice		
Seneca	Benjamin Hendricks		
Seneca	Daniel Scott		
Steuben	Daniel Cruger		
Steuben	Grattan H. Wheeler		
Suffolk	Usher H. Moore		
Suffolk	John M. Williamson		
Sullivan	Thomas Crary		
Tioga	Isaac Baldwin		
Tioga	Anson Camp		
Tompkins	Nathan Benson		
Tompkins	David Woodcock	Dem.-Rep./Bucktail	in November 1826, elected to the 20th U. S. Congress
Ulster	Charles Bryan		
Ulster	James T. Elmore		
Ulster	John Lounsbery		
Warren	Norman Fox		
Washington	Hiram Cole		
Washington	James Stevenson		
Washington	Israel Williams		
Washington	David Woods		
Wayne	Ambrose Hall		
Wayne	John L. Kip		
Westchester	Joseph Scofield*	Dem.-Rep./Bucktail	
Westchester	John H. Smith		
Westchester	James Wiley		
Yates	Avery Smith		

=== Employees ===
- Clerk: Edward Livingston
- Sergeant-at-Arms: Chester Griswold
- Doorkeeper: William Seely
- Assistant Doorkeeper: James D. Scollard

== Sources ==
- The New York Civil List compiled by Franklin Benjamin Hough (Weed, Parsons and Co., 1858) [see pg. 109 and 441 for Senate districts; pg. 126 for senators; pg. 148f for Assembly districts; pg. 203f for assemblymen]
- The History of Political Parties in the State of New-York, from the Ratification of the Federal Constitution to 1840 by Jabez D. Hammond (4th ed., Vol. 2, Phinney & Co., Buffalo, 1850; pg. 206 to 230)
