= 1825–1826 United States Senate election in New York =

The 1825/1826 United States Senate election in New York was held on February 1, 1825, and January 14, 1826, by the New York State Legislature to elect a U.S. senator (Class 3) to represent the State of New York in the United States Senate.

== Background ==
Rufus King had been elected in 1820 to this seat, and his term would expire on March 3, 1825. Because of his advanced age, he declined to run for re-election.

Although nominally in the same party, the Democratic-Republican Party was split into two fiercely opposing factions: the "Clintonians" (allies of Governor DeWitt Clinton), and "Bucktails" (a combine of the Tammany members from New York City and Clinton's upstate adversaries led by Martin Van Buren). The Bucktails had increased steadily in strength, but the presidential election of 1824 split the Bucktails into the supporters of William H. Crawford, John Quincy Adams, Henry Clay and Andrew Jackson. Early in 1824, the Crawfordians were the largest faction. In opposition to them, a new electoral law was debated in the State Legislature, which would transfer the election of presidential electors to the people at the State election instead of choosing them by joint ballot of the State Legislature. No such law was enacted, the Crawfordians managing to postpone indefinitely the resolution offered during the special sessions of the Legislature in August and November 1824. To pursue their goal, the supporters of the popular ballot for presidential electors formed the "People's Party" which, despite the leaders being adversaries of Ex-Governor DeWitt Clinton, nominated the latter for Governor.

At the State election in November 1824, the combined forces of the People's Party and the Clintonians elected Clinton Governor, a large majority to the Assembly, and six of the eight State Senators up for renewal. The 48th New York State Legislature met from January 4 to April 21, 1825, at Albany, New York. In the Assembly, Clarkson Crolius, one of the Bucktails who had joined the People's Party and supported Adams for President, was elected Speaker with 109 votes of 122 members present.

== Candidates ==
The People's Party-Clintonian State legislators met in caucus and almost unanimously nominated the longtime leader of the Clintonians, Mayor of Albany Ambrose Spencer. Spencer had been Chief Justice of the New York State Supreme Court until the end of 1822 when he was legislated out of office by the new State Constitution. His re-appointment early in 1823, on nomination by Bucktail Governor Joseph C. Yates, had been rejected by the State Senate.

Ex-Gov. Joseph C. Yates; Lt. Gov. James Tallmadge, Jr.; Congressman John W. Taylor; Canal Commissioners Samuel Young and Henry Seymour; Mayor of New York City William Paulding, Jr.; First Judge of the New York County Court John T. Irving; U.S. Attorney for the Northern District of New York Samuel Beardsley; District Attorney of Onondaga County Victory Birdseye; U.S. Supreme Court Reporter Henry Wheaton; Ex-Congressman Isaac Wilson; Ex-State Senators Henry Huntington and Edward P. Livingston; Rufus Crane, of Herkimer County; and S. Suydam received scattering votes.

== Result 1825, no choice ==
On February 1, 1825, the State Legislature attempted to elect a U.S. Senator.

The Assembly nominated Ambrose Spencer by a vote of 77 to 45.

Knowing that the large majority of assemblymen would outvote the Senators on joint ballot, the Anti-Spencer Senate majority took refuge to the only means to defeat Spencer: They did not nominate anybody, so that a joint ballot could not be held. On the first ballot, Spencer received 10 votes out of 31 cast. Then Samuel Wilkeson offered a resolution to declare Spencer nominated, which was rejected by 20 to 11. Wilkeson then offered a resolution in favor of Lt. Gov. James Tallmadge, Jr. Heman J. Redfield moved that this resolution lie on the table, which was carried by 19 to 12. Wilkeson then offered a resolution in favor of Samuel Young. Silas Wright, Jr. moved that this resolution also lie on the table, which was carried by 20 to 11. At this point, a message from the Assembly was received, calling for a joint meeting to compare nominations. Thereupon Wilkeson proposed a second ballot which was taken, and Spencer received 8 votes out of 31 cast. Wilkeson then offered a resolution in favor of John W. Taylor, which was rejected by 22 to 9, and the Senate adjourned.

1825 United States Senator election result
Office	Candidate	Party	Senate (32 members) (first ballot)	Senate (32 members) (second ballot)	Assembly (127 members)
U.S. Senator	Ambrose Spencer	Dem.-Rep./Clintonian	10	8	77
	James Tallmadge, Jr.	Dem.-Rep./People's Party	2	4	
	Samuel Young	Dem.-Rep./Bucktails	2	2	
	Edward P. Livingston		2	2	
	Victory Birdseye		2	2	
	John W. Taylor		2	2	
	Joseph C. Yates	Dem.-Rep./Bucktails	1	2	
	Henry Seymour	Dem.-Rep./Bucktails	1	1	
	Henry Wheaton		1	1	
	Samuel Beardsley		1	1	
	Henry Huntington	Dem.-Rep./Clintonian	1	1	
	S. Suydam		1	1	
	John T. Irving		1	1	
	Isaac Wilson		1	1	
	William Paulding, Jr.		1	1	
	Rufus Crane		1	1	
	David E. Evans		1		

On February 25, 1825, the State Senate adopted by a vote of 18 to 10 a "joint resolution" that Albert H. Tracy be declared elected a U.S. Senator. This meant that Tracy was not nominated by the Senate to proceed then to a joint ballot, but that the Senate asked the Assembly to concur in the election of the Senate's candidate. The Assembly refused to concur, on the grounds that the "concurrent vote" was contrary to State law which required a "joint ballot," and the seat became vacant on March 4. On March 25, another "joint resolution" was adopted in the Senate, this time in favor of Lt. Gov. James Tallmadge, Jr. This time, the Assembly voted that the resolution was tabled. On April 1, on motion of Samuel J. Wilkin, it was taken up and rejected by a vote of 61 to 21. No further action was taken by this Legislature.

== Election, 1826 ==
At the State election in November 1825, Martin Van Buren managed to keep the presidential election issue out of view, and the Bucktail and Clintonian factions re-aligned. A Bucktail majority was elected to the Assembly, but five of the eight State Senators elected were Clintonians. The 49th New York State Legislature met from January 3 to April 18, 1826, at Albany, New York.

The strength of the factions in the Assembly was shown by the vote for Speaker: 65 for Bucktail Samuel Young and 54 for Stephen Allen who was a Bucktail but had lost the caucus for Speaker to Young, and received the votes of the Clintonians.

The Bucktail State legislators held a caucus for U.S. Senator and nominated Chancellor Nathan Sanford. Sanford had been a U.S. Senator from 1815 to 1821 and, when running for re-election as a Clintonian, had been defeated by the leader of the Bucktails, Martin Van Buren. Van Buren had by now abandoned Crawford, and maneuvered to get the Governor's and the Clintonians' support for Andrew Jackson at the next presidential election. Thus Chancellor Sanford appeared as a compromise candidate supported by both factions of the party. Upon his nomination, Sanford resigned from the bench, and on January 14, 1826, the State Legislature elected him nearly unanimously. He took his seat on January 31, 1826, and remained in office until March 3, 1831.

== Sources ==
- The New York Civil List compiled in 1858 (see: pg. 63 for U.S. Senators; pg. 126 for State Senators 1825 and 1826; pg. 202f for Members of Assembly 1825; pg. 203f for Members of Assembly 1826;)
- Members of the 19th United States Congress
- History of Political Parties in the State of New-York, Vol. II by Jabez Delano Hammond (Speaker election, 1825: pg. 185; U.S. Senate election 1825: pg. 191ff; U.S. Senate election 1826: pg. 209ff)
- Election result (Caucus for U.S. Senator, 1825) at Tufts University Library project "A New Nation Votes"
