= Truman Hart =

American politician (1784–1838)

Truman Hart (December 9, 1784 Farmington, Hartford County, Connecticut - February 7, 1838 Palmyra, Wayne County, New York) was an American lawyer and politician from New York.

== Life ==
He was the son of Thomas Hart (b. 1749), President of the Hamilton-Oneida Academy and assemblyman in 1806, and Mary (Hungerford) Hart (1751–1823). In 1812, he married Susan Carpenter (1795–1875), and they had five children, among them Abbie Louisa Hart (1814–1840) who married Congressman Theron R. Strong.

Truman Hart was a member of the New York State Assembly (Ontario Co.) in 1820-21.

He was a member of the New York State Senate (7th D.) from 1826 to 1829, sitting in the 49th, 50th, 51st and 52nd New York State Legislatures.

He was buried at Mount Hope Cemetery, Rochester.

Congressman Roswell Hart was his nephew. State Senator Ephraim Hart was his brother.

== Sources ==
- The New York Civil List compiled by Franklin Benjamin Hough (pages 126ff, 141, 197 and 279; Weed, Parsons and Co., 1858)
- Hart genealogy at RootsWeb
- Hart family at Political Graveyard

New York State Senate
Preceded by Jesse Clark	New York State Senate; Seventh District (Class 3); 1826–1829	Succeeded by Thomas Armstrong
