= James McCall (politician) =

American politician

James McCall (January 6, 1774 in Lebanon Springs, Columbia County, New York – March 26, 1856 in Rushford, Allegany County, New York) was an American merchant and politician from New York.

== Biography ==
He was the son of Benajah McCall (1743–1824) and Abigail (Comstock) McCall (1745–1776). He removed to Ovid, New York. On December 19, 1799, he married Elizabeth Dye (1783–1833), and they had 14 children.

McCall was a member of the New York State Assembly (Seneca Co.) in 1808-09, 1812-13 and 1814,

In 1814, he removed to Rushford, where he kept a store and ran a grist mill. He was again a member of the State Assembly (Allegany & Steuben Co.) in 1818 and 1819; and a delegate to the New York State Constitutional Convention of 1821.

He was again a member of the State Assembly (Allegany Co.) in 1823; and a member of the New York State Senate (8th D.) from 1824 to 1827, sitting in the 47th, 48th, 49th and 50th New York State Legislatures.

On June 2, 1836, he married Lydia Washburn (ca. 1780–1850). In November 1836, McCall was elected a presidential elector, but did not attend the meeting of the New York Electoral College, and Jacob Sutherland was chosen to fill the vacancy.

He was buried at the McCall Cemetery in Podonque, a hamlet in Rushford.

== Sources ==
- The New York Civil List compiled by Franklin Benjamin Hough (pages 57, 125ff, 143, 182, 187, 189, 193f, 199, 289 and 328; Weed, Parsons and Co., 1858)
- Burial monument at Allegany Co. Local History
- McCall genealogy at Family Tree Maker

New York State Assembly
Preceded by John Sayre	New York State Assembly, Seneca Co. 1808–1809	Succeeded by Oliver C. Comstock
Preceded by Oliver C. Comstock	New York State Assembly, Seneca Co. 1812–1814	Succeeded by David Woodcock
Preceded by new district	New York State Assembly, Allegany Co. 1823	Succeeded by Lazarus S. Rathbun
New York State Senate
Preceded by Timothy H. Porter	New York State Senate; Eighth District (Class 1); 1824–1827	Succeeded by Timothy H. Porter
