= John Magee (New York politician) =

American politician from New York (1794–1868

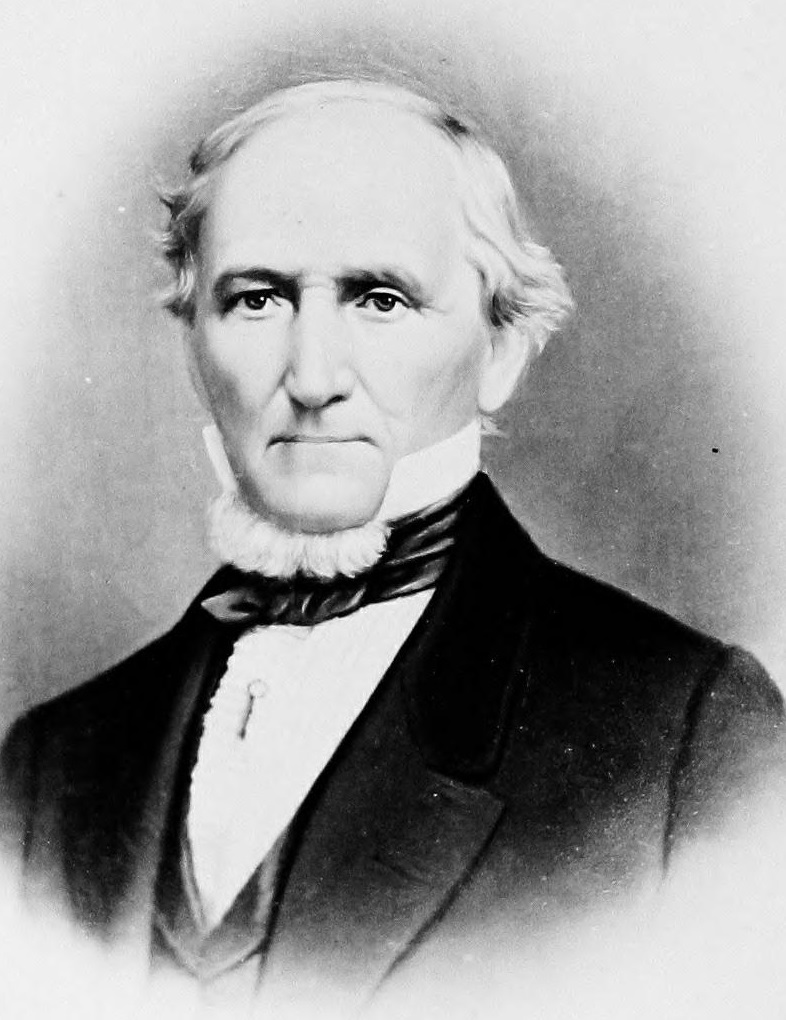

Member of the U.S. House of Representatives from New York's 28th district
- In office March 4, 1827 – March 3, 1831
- Preceded by: Timothy H. Porter
- Succeeded by: Grattan H. Wheeler

Personal details
- Born: September 3, 1794 Easton, Pennsylvania
- Died: April 5, 1868 (aged 73) Watkins, New York
- Party: Jacksonian
- Occupation: Banker, railroad executive

John Magee (September 3, 1794 – April 5, 1868) was an American veteran of the War of 1812 who served two terms as a member of the United States House of Representatives from New York from 1827 to 1831.

== Biography ==
Magee was born in Easton, Northampton County, Pennsylvania, where he attended public schools. He served in the United States Army in the War of 1812; moved to Bath, Steuben County, New York in 1812. He was elected constable in 1818 and served until 1820. He was appointed Sheriff of Steuben County, New York in 1821 and elected to that office in 1822.

=== Congress ===
Magee was elected to the U.S. House of Representatives in 1826 as a Jacksonian and was re-elected in 1828. He ran for re-election in 1830 but lost to the Anti-Masonic candidate, Grattan H. Wheeler. Magee served as a delegate to the State Constitutional Convention in 1867. His 1831 home in Bath was the Davenport Free Library from 1893 to 1999, and is a National Register site under the Davenport name. Currently called the Magee House, it now houses Steuben County Historical Society and the Steuben County Historian's office.

=== Later career and death ===
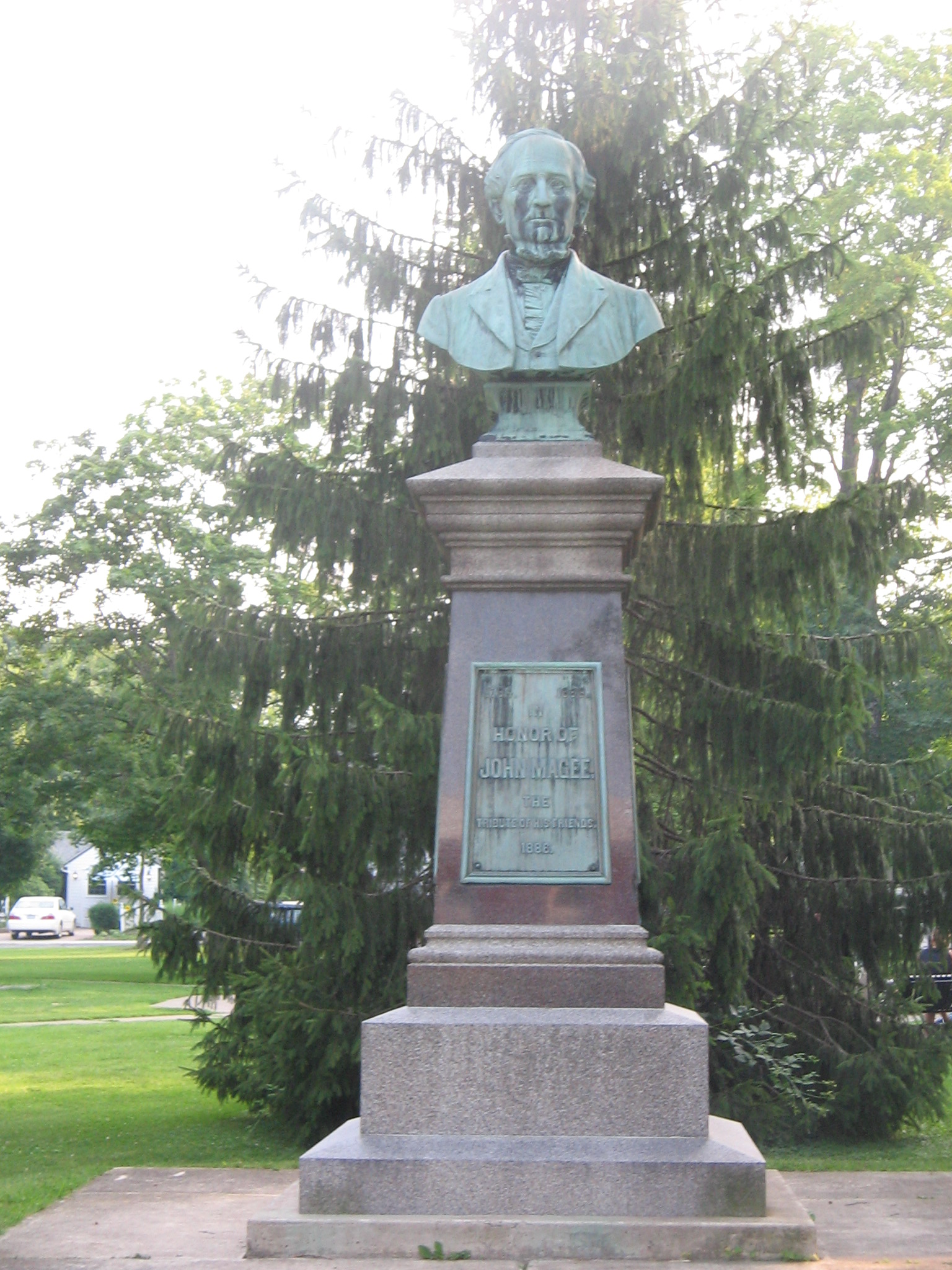
Monument to Magee in Wellsboro, Pennsylvania

Magee devoted the remaining years of his life to banking, railroading, and was also interested in mining. Magee died at Watkins, Schuyler County, New York on April 5, 1868 at the age of 73. He is interred in Glenwood Cemetery.

=== Legacy ===
Watkins Glen, New York and Wellsboro, Pennsylvania each have a Magee Street named for John Magee, or for his family. Duncan Township, in Tioga County, Pennsylvania, is named for one of this sons.

U.S. House of Representatives
Preceded by Timothy H. Porter	Member of the U.S. House of Representatives from New York's 28th congressional district March 4, 1827 – March 3, 1831	Succeeded by Grattan H. Wheeler
