= Silas Bowker =

American politician

Silas Bowker (April 26, 1763 Concord, Middlesex County, Massachusetts – October 14, 1834 Locke, Cayuga County, New York) was an American politician from New York.

== Life ==
He was the son of Silas Bowker (1739–1789) and Esther (Hobbs) Bowker (1739–1824). He married Amy Harding (1769–1843), and they had six children.

He was a member of the New York State Assembly (Cayuga Co.) in 1814 and 1814–15.

He was a member of the New York State Senate (7th D.) in 1823; and again of the State Assembly (Cayuga Co.) in 1824.

He was buried at a cemetery in Locke, known as the Bowker Family or the Abbott Farm Cemetery.

== Sources ==
- The New York Civil List compiled by Franklin Benjamin Hough (pages 125, 139, 188f and 200; Weed, Parsons and Co., 1858)

New York State Senate
| Preceded by new district | New York State Senate; Seventh District (Class 1); 1823 | Succeeded by Jedediah Morgan |
