= Richard McMichael =

American politician

Richard McMichael (c. 1788 – c. 1843) was an American politician from New York.

== Life ==
He was the son of James McMichael (1752–1828) and Maria (Hall) McMichael. On December 13, 1812, he married Maria Marselis (1795–1854), and they had eight children.

He was a member of the New York State Assembly (Schenectady Co.) in 1820-21.

He was a member of the New York State Senate (3rd D.) from 1825 to 1828, sitting in the 48th, 49th, 50th and 51st New York State Legislatures.

== Sources ==
- The New York Civil List compiled by Franklin Benjamin Hough (pages 126f, 143, 197 and 290; Weed, Parsons and Co., 1858)
- Contributions for the Genealogies of the Descendants of the First Settlers of the patent and City of Schenectady from 1662 to 1800 by Jonathan Pearson (Albany, 1873; reprinted 1998; pg. 112 and 117)
- Cemetery transcriptions at Schenectady History [says "died 1843, aged 55 years"]

New York State Senate
Preceded by Edward P. Livingston	New York State Senate; Third District (Class 2); 1825 - 1828	Succeeded by Lewis Eaton
