= Peter Hager II =

American politician

Peter Hager II (November 20, 1784 – January 26, 1854, in Hector, then in Tompkins Co., now in Schuyler County, New York) was an American politician from New York.

== Life ==
He was the son of Capt. John Hager (ca. 1762–1818) and Nancy (Patchen) Hager (1764–1849). He married Amanda Smith (b. 1787), and they had ten children. Later he married Abigail Platt (b. 1794).

Hager was a member of the New York State Assembly representing Tompkins County, New York in 1820–21, 1822, 1823 and 1824. He was also a member of the New York State Senate (6th D.) from 1826 to 1829, sitting in the 49th, 50th, 51st and 52nd New York State Legislatures.

He was Sheriff of Tompkins County, New York from 1832 to 1834.

Hager was buried at the Presbyterian Church Cemetery in Hector.

== Sources ==
- The New York Civil List compiled by Franklin Benjamin Hough (pages 126ff, 141, 199ff, 278 and 408; Weed, Parsons and Co., 1858)
- Hager genealogy at RootsWeb
- The Early Germans of New Jersey by Theodore Frelinghuysen Chambers (Dover NJ, 1895; reprinted 2000; pg. 392)

New York State Senate
Preceded by Tilly Lynde	New York State Senate; Sixth District (Class 3); 1826–1829	Succeeded by Levi Beardsley
