= John Crary =

American politician

John Crary (July 10, 1770 - May 18, 1848) was an American politician from New York.

== Life ==
Born in Hoosick Falls, New York on July 10, 1770, he studied law and became an attorney in Salem, New York.

From 1808 to 1809 he served as Clerk of Washington County. He was a member of the New York State Assembly (Washington Co.) in 1824.

He was a member of the New York State Senate (4th D.) from 1825 to 1828, sitting in the 48th, 49th, 50th and 51st New York State Legislatures.

In 1828, Crary ran on the Anti-Masonic ticket for Lieutenant Governor of New York, but was defeated by Democrat Enos T. Throop.

He died in Salem on May 18, 1848 and was buried at the Revolutionary Cemetery in Salem, New York.

== Sources ==
New York State Senate
| Preceded by Melancton Wheeler | New York State Senate; Fourth District (Class 2); 1825 - 1828 | Succeeded by John McLean Jr. |
