= Latham A. Burrows =

American politician (1792–1855)

Member of the New York Senate from the 6th district
- In office 1824–1827
- Preceded by: Samuel G. Hathaway
- Succeeded by: Grattan H. Wheeler

Personal details
- Born: Latham Avery Burrows; August 30, 1792 Groton, Connecticut, U.S.
- Died: September 25, 1855 (aged 63) Buffalo, New York, U.S.
- Spouse: Sarah Lester (m. 1816)
- Relatives: Lorenzo Burrows (brother)
- Occupation: Politician

Latham Avery Burrows (August 30, 1792 Groton, New London County, Connecticut – September 25, 1855 Buffalo, Erie County, New York) was an American politician from New York.

== Life ==
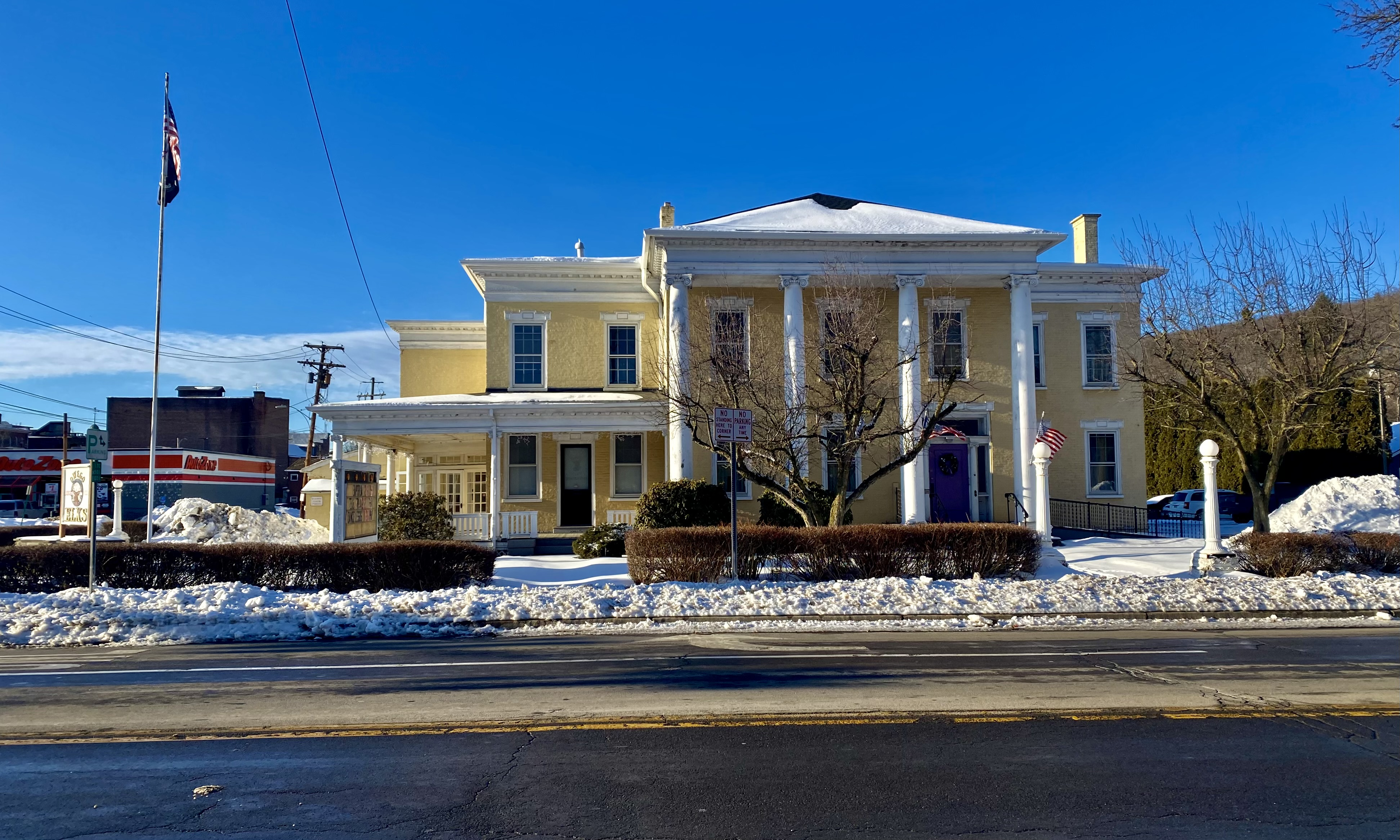
Burrows' former home in Owego, built in 1831 and now home of the local Elks lodge.

He was the son of Rev. Roswell Burrows (1768–1837) and Jerusha (Avery) Burrows (1771–1838). He removed to Owego, New York. In 1816, he married Sarah Lester.

He was a presidential elector in 1820, voting for James Monroe and Daniel D. Tompkins. Burrows was Clerk of Broome County, New York from 1821 to 1822.

He was a member of the New York State Senate (6th D.) from 1824 to 1827, sitting in the 47th, 48th, 49th and 50th New York State Legislatures.

In 1848, he was Collector of Tolls for the Erie Canal at Buffalo.

New York State Comptroller Lorenzo Burrows (1805–1885) was his brother.

== Sources ==
- History of the Town of Stonington, County of New London, Connecticut by Richard Anson Wheeler (1900; pg. 283)
- The New York Civil List compiled by Franklin Benjamin Hough (pages 125ff, 139, 326 and 386; Weed, Parsons and Co., 1858)
- Burrows genealogy at RootsWeb
- Marriage notice, transcribed from the Connecticut Courant, at RootsWeb
- The Buffalo Directory (1848; pg. 37)

New York State Senate
Preceded by Samuel G. Hathaway	New York State Senate; Sixth District (Class 1); 1824–1827	Succeeded by Grattan H. Wheeler
