= 1827 United States Senate election in New York =

- February 6, 1827

Majority vote of legislature needed to win
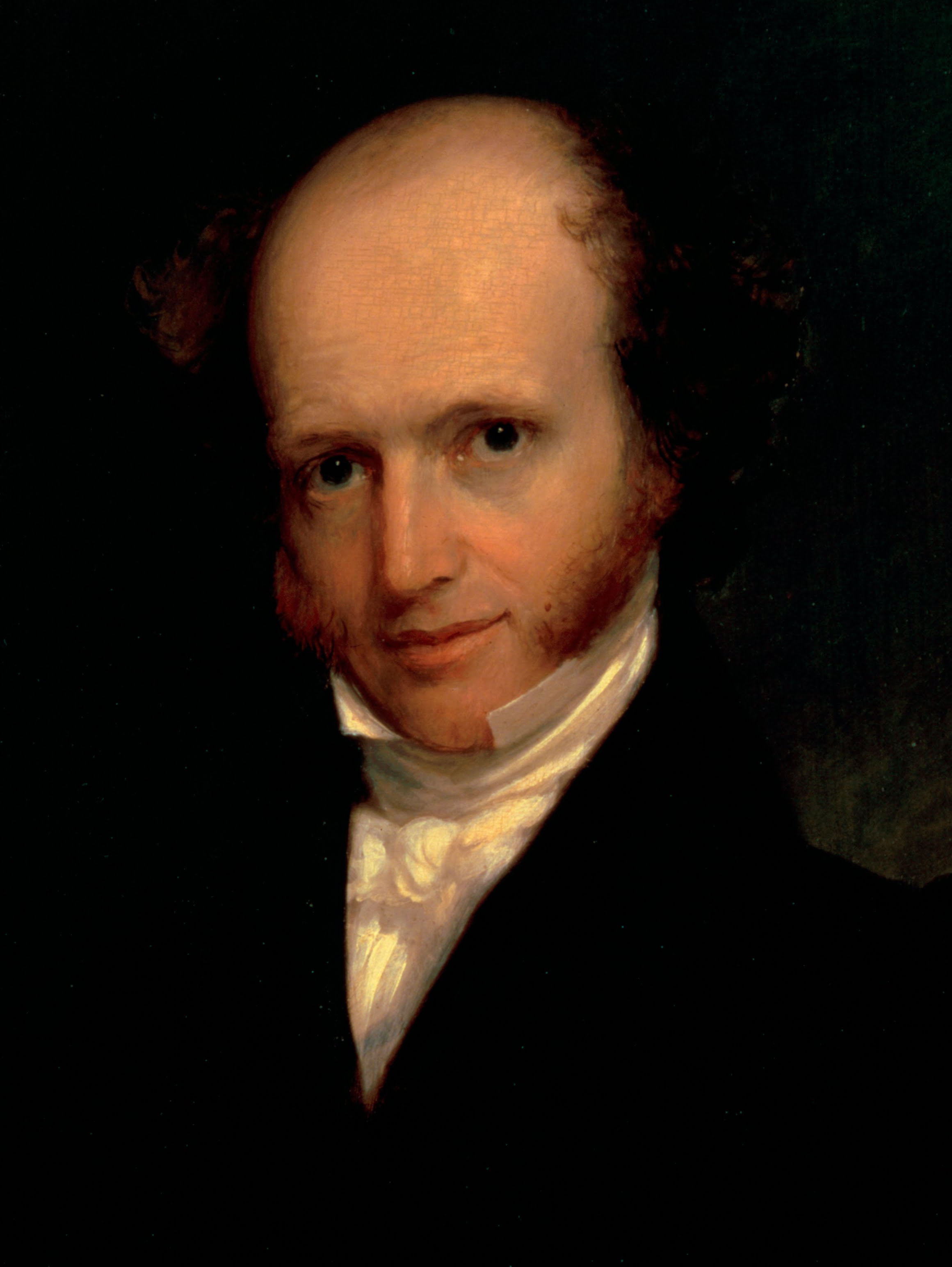

Nominee	Martin Van Buren	Stephen Van Rensselaer
Party	Democratic-Republican	Democratic-Republican
Alliance	Bucktails	DeWitt Clinton
Senator before election
Martin Van Buren
Democratic-Republican
Elected Senator
Martin Van Buren
Democratic-Republican

The 1827 United States Senate election in New York was held on February 6, 1827, by the New York State Legislature to elect a U.S. senator (Class 1) to represent New York in the Senate.

== Background ==
Martin Van Buren had been elected in 1821 to this seat, and his term would expire on March 3, 1827.

Although nominally in the same party, the Democratic-Republicans were split into two fiercely opposing factions: the "Clintonians" (allies of Governor DeWitt Clinton), and "Bucktails" (a combine of the Tammany members from New York City and Clinton's upstate adversaries led by Martin Van Buren). Both factions were divided into supporters of John Quincy Adams and Andrew Jackson, the Clintonian majority for Adams, the Bucktail majority for Jackson.

At the State election in November 1826, although Clinton was re-elected Governor, a Bucktails majority was elected to the Assembly, and eight of the ten State Senators elected were Bucktails. The 50th New York State Legislature met from January 2 to April 17, from June 27 to July 24 (Senate only), and from September 11 to December 4, 1827, at Albany, New York. The party strength in the Assembly as shown by the vote for Speaker was: 74 for Bucktail Erastus Root and 33 for Clintonian Francis Granger.

== Candidates ==
The Adams-Clintonians called a caucus of all Adams supporting State legislators which was held on January 26, 1827, but was attended by only two Adams-Bucktails. Since the U.S. Senator would be active in federal politics, the Adams-Clintonians thought it possible to form an Adams majority in the State Legislature across Clintonian-Bucktail party lines, to outvote the Bucktail majority. However, the Bucktails were unwilling to cross the line, and the incumbent U.S. Senator Van Buren, although behind the scenes maneuvering on behalf of Jackson, had not made public his choice, contending that he was neither for nor against the Adams administration. The caucus nominated Congressman and Canal Commissioner Stephen van Rensselaer, the man who was said to have cast the deciding vote for Adams in the presidential election of 1824 which had been referred to a vote in the U.S. House of Representatives.

The incumbent U.S. Senator Martin Van Buren ran for re-election as the Bucktails candidate.

== Result ==
Martin Van Buren received large majorities, including votes from the Jackson-Clintonians, in both the Assembly and the Senate, and was declared elected.

1827 United States Senator election result
Office	House	Dem.-Rep./Bucktails	Dem.-Rep./Clintonian
U.S. Senator	State Senate (32 members)	Martin Van Buren	Stephen Van Rensselaer
	State Assembly (128 members)	Martin Van Buren	Stephen Van Rensselaer

== Aftermath ==
Martin Van Buren resigned his seat on December 20, 1828, after his election as Governor of New York. The State Legislature held a special election to fill the vacancy in January 1829, and elected Charles E. Dudley.

== Sources ==
- The New York Civil List compiled in 1858 (see: pg. 63 for U.S. Senators; pg. 126f for State Senators 1827; pg. 204ff for Members of Assembly 1827)
- Members of the 20th United States Congress
- History of Political Parties in the State of New-York, Vol. II by Jabez Delano Hammond (State election, 1826: pg. 235f; possible U.S. Senate candidatures: pg. 240f; Speaker election, 1827: pg. 242; U.S. Senate election, 1827: pg. 245ff)
