= Grattan H. Wheeler =

American politician

Grattan Henry Wheeler
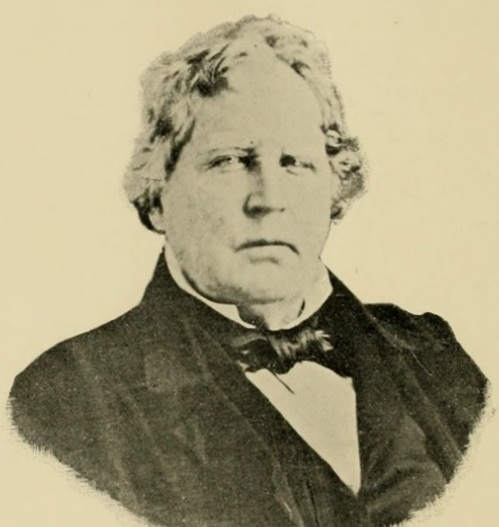
- Grattan H. Wheeler, Congressman from New York

Member of the New York Senate from the Sixth (Class 1) district
- In office 1828–1831
- Preceded by: Latham A. Burrows
- Succeeded by: John G. McDowell

Member of the U.S. House of Representatives from New York's 28th district
- In office March 4, 1831 – March 3, 1833
- Preceded by: John Magee
- Succeeded by: Frederick Whittlesey

Personal details
- Born: August 25, 1783 Providence, Rhode Island, United States
- Died: March 11, 1852 (aged 68) Wheeler, New York, United States
- Resting place: Wheeler Family Cemetery, Wheeler, New York, United States
- Party: Anti-Mason
- Other political affiliations: Whig

Grattan Henry Wheeler (August 25, 1783 – March 11, 1852) was an American politician from New York.

== Life ==
Wheeler was born near Providence, Rhode Island, on August 25, 1783. He was the son of Silas Wheeler (1752–1827), a veteran of the American Revolution who took part in the burning of the Gaspée.

Later in the Revolution, Silas Wheeler joined the crew of a privateer. He was captured by the British and jailed in Kinsale, Ireland. He escaped with the help of the Irish Patriot, Henry Grattan. In gratitude, Silas Wheeler named his son after Grattan.

Wheeler attended public and preparatory schools in Rhode Island. He moved to Steuben County, New York, with his parents in 1800, and became a farmer, lumberman and winemaker. The Wheeler family founded Wheeler, the Steuben County town that was named for them.

Wheeler was active in the New York Militia, and attained the rank of Lieutenant Colonel as a member of the 96th Infantry Regiment. He also served as Wheeler's Town Supervisor from 1823 to 1824.

He was a member of the New York State Assembly in 1822, 1824 and 1826.

He was a member of the New York State Senate from 1828 to 1831, sitting in the 51st, 52nd, 53rd and 54th New York State Legislatures.

Wheeler was elected as an Anti-Mason to the 22nd United States Congress, holding office from March 4, 1831, to March 3, 1833.

He was a presidential elector on the Whig ticket in 1840, voting for William Henry Harrison and John Tyler.

Wheeler died in Wheeler on March 11, 1852. He was buried at the Wheeler Family Cemetery in Wheeler.

New York State Senate
Preceded by Latham A. Burrows	New York State Senate; Sixth District (Class 1); 1828–1831	Succeeded by John G. McDowell
U.S. House of Representatives
Preceded by John Magee	Member of the U.S. House of Representatives from New York's 28th congressional district 1831–1833	Succeeded by Frederick Whittlesey
