= Ethan B. Allen =

American lawyer and politician

Ethan Benjamin Allen (October 21, 1781, Hillsdale, Columbia County, New York – April 19, 1835, Batavia, Genesee County, New York) was an American lawyer and politician from New York.

== Life ==
He was the son of Benjamin Allen and Hannah (Rowley) Allen. He married Harriet Eliza Seymour (1794–1867), and they had several children.

He was a member of the New York State Senate (8th D.) from 1826 to 1829, sitting in the 49th, 50th, 51st and 52nd New York State Legislatures.

== Sources ==
- The New York Civil List compiled by Franklin Benjamin Hough (pages 126ff and 138; Weed, Parsons and Co., 1858)
- Genealogical Journal of the Utah Genealogical Society (1995; pg. 19f) [gives birth year "1781"]

New York State Senate
Preceded by Heman J. Redfield	New York State Senate; Eighth District (Class 3); 1826–1829	Succeeded by Albert H. Tracy
