= Victory Birdseye =

American politician

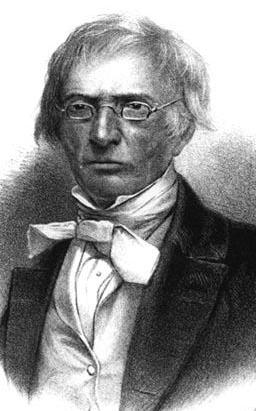

Member of the U.S. House of Representatives from New York
- In office March 4, 1841 – March 3, 1843
- Preceded by: Nehemiah H. Earll
- Succeeded by: Orville Robinson
- Constituency: 23rd district
- In office March 4, 1815 – March 3, 1817
- Preceded by: James Geddes
- Succeeded by: James Porter
- Constituency: 19th district

Member of the New York State Assembly from the Onondaga County district
- In office January 1, 1840 – December 31, 1840
- Preceded by: James R. Lawrence
- Succeeded by: Moses D. Burnet
- In office January 1, 1838 – December 31, 1838
- Preceded by: Daniel Denison
- Succeeded by: James R. Lawrence
- In office January 1, 1823 – December 31, 1823
- Preceded by: Silvester Gardner
- Succeeded by: Samuel L. Edwards

Member of the New York Senate from the 7th district
- In office January 1, 1827 – December 31, 1827
- Preceded by: Jedediah Morgan
- Succeeded by: George B. Throop

Personal details
- Born: December 25, 1782 Cornwall, Litchfield County, Connecticut, United States
- Died: September 16, 1853 (aged 70) Pompey, Onondaga County, New York
- Party: Democratic-Republican Whig
- Spouse: Electa Beebee Birdseye
- Children: Ellen Douglas Birdseye Wheaton
- Education: Williams College
- Profession: lawyer politician

Victory Birdseye (December 25, 1782 – September 16, 1853) was an American politician and a U. S. Representative from New York.

== Biography ==
Birdseye was born in Cornwall, Litchfield County, Connecticut attended the public schools at Cornwall, Connecticut. He graduated from Williams College in 1804. Then he studied law, was admitted to the bar in 1807, and commenced practice in partnership with Daniel Wood, Esquire, in Pompey Hill, New York until 1814. In 1813, he married Electa Beebee of Pompey. His daughter Ellen Douglas Birdseye married abolitionist Charles Augustus Wheaton. His great-grandson Clarence Birdseye developed the process for freezing food and founded Birds Eye Frozen Foods.

== Career ==
Elected as a Democratic-Republican to the 14th United States Congress, Birdseye held the office of United States Representative for the nineteenth district of New York from March 4, 1815, to March 3, 1817.

Birdseye was Postmaster of Pompey Hill from 1817 to 1838, D.A. of Onondaga County from 1818 to 1833, and a delegate to the New York State Constitutional Convention of 1821. He was a member of the New York State Assembly (Onondaga Co.) in 1823, and of the New York State Senate (7th D.) in 1827.

Birdseye served as the special counsel to conduct prosecution in the trial of parties for the alleged abduction of William Morgan, a man who threatened exposure of the Freemason's secrets and whose disappearance brought about powerful anti-masonic sentiments in the U.S., sparking the formation of the Anti-Masonic Party.

Birdseye was again a member of the State Assembly in 1838 and 1840. While serving the latter term, Birdseye drafted and ushered through a bill that provided for the rescue of New York State citizens who had been kidnapped and sold into slavery. Under the provisions of that law, Solomon Northup, who had been enslaved in Louisiana, was restored to freedom in 1853.

Elected as a Whig to the 27th United States Congress, Birdseye held the office of U. S. Representative for the twenty-third district of New York from March 4, 1841, to March 3, 1843. Afterwards he resumed the practice of law.

== Death ==
He died on September 16, 1853, in Pompey, Onondaga County, New York; and was buried at the Pompey Hill Cemetery there.

U.S. House of Representatives
Preceded by James Geddes	Member of the U.S. House of Representatives from New York's 19th congressional district 1815–1817	Succeeded by James Porter
New York State Senate
Preceded by Jedediah Morgan	New York State Senate; Seventh District (Class 1); 1827	Succeeded by George B. Throop
U.S. House of Representatives
Preceded by Nehemiah H. Earll, Edward Rogers	Member of the U.S. House of Representatives from New York's 23rd congressional district 1841–1843 with A. Lawrence Foster	Succeeded by Orville Robinson
