= George Brayton (New York politician) =

American politician

George Brayton (February 8, 1772 – March 7, 1837 Westernville, Oneida County, New York) was an American politician from New York.

== Life ==
He was the son of Assemblyman Isaac Brayton and Cynthia (Whipple) Brayton (b. 1746). On October 5, 1800, he married Sarah Swan (1777–1841).

George Brayton was a member of the New York State Assembly (Oneida Co.) in 1804–05, 1806, 1807.

In 1812, he was appointed Postmaster of Westernville. In 1814, he was appointed an associate judge of the Oneida County Court. He was again a member of the State Assembly (Oneida Co.) in 1818.

He was a member of the New York State Senate (5th D.) from 1825 to 1826, sitting in the 48th and 49th New York State Legislatures. He resigned his seat on April 18, 1826, the last day of that year's regular session of the Legislature.

In 1828, he was one of the original incorporators of the Black River Canal Company.

He was buried at the Presbyterian Church Cemetery in Westernville.

== Sources ==
- The New York Civil List compiled by Franklin Benjamin Hough (pages 126, 139, 178ff, 193 and 261; Weed, Parsons and Co., 1858)
- Laws of the State of New York (1828; pg. 85f)
- Brayton Family History by Clifford Ross Brayton (Vol. 2; pg. 57f)

New York State Senate
Preceded by Alvin Bronson	New York State Senate; Fifth District (Class 2); 1825–1826	Succeeded by Charles Dayan
