= Jedediah Morgan =

American politician

Jedediah Morgan (March 14, 1774 – December 10, 1826) was an American farmer and politician from New York.

== Life ==
He was born in North Groton, New London County, Connecticut, the son of Thomas Morgan (1742–1815) and Sarah (Leeds) Morgan (1744–1832). In 1792, he removed with his father to a farm about 3 miles south of the Village of Aurora, NY. In 1797, he married Amanda M. Stanton (d. 1811), and they had five children. On January 26, 1812, he married Harriet Steele, and they had eight children, among them the pioneering anthropologist, social theorist and state legislator, Lewis H. Morgan (1818–1881).

In 1822, he left the farm, and went to live in the Village of Aurora. In 1823, he was elected Supervisor of the Town of Ledyard, New York.

Jedediah Morgan was a member of the New York State Senate (7th D.) from 1824 to 1826, sitting in the 47th, 48th and 49th New York State Legislatures. In 1824, Morgan was one of only three State Senators who voted against the removal of DeWitt Clinton from the Erie Canal Commission. In 1826, he resigned his seat in the Senate due to ill health, and died soon afterwards, at Aurora, Cayuga County, New York.

== Sources ==
- Life Sketches of the State Officers, Senator, and Members of the Assembly, of the State of New York in 1868 by Samuel Ralph Harlow & Stephen C. Hutchins (pg. 103ff; "Lewis H. Morgan")
- The Promise of Progress: the Life and Work of Lewis Henry Morgan by Daniel Noah Moses (2009; pg. 9ff)
- The New York Civil List compiled by Franklin Benjamin Hough (pages 125f and 143; Weed, Parsons and Co., 1858)

New York State Senate
Preceded by Silas Bowker	New York State Senate; Seventh District (Class 1); 1824–1826	Succeeded by Victory Birdseye
