= Timothy H. Porter =

American lawyer and politician

Member of the U.S. House of Representatives from New York's 28th district
- In office March 4, 1825 – March 3, 1827
- Preceded by: William Woods
- Succeeded by: John Magee

Member of the New York Senate from the 8th district
- In office January 1, 1823 – December 31, 1823
- Succeeded by: James McCall
- In office January 1, 1828 – December 31, 1831
- Preceded by: James McCall
- Succeeded by: John Birdsall

Personal details
- Born: November 28, 1785 Waterbury, Connecticut, USA
- Died: December 16, 1845 (aged 60) Olean, New York, USA
- Resting place: Mount View Cemetery
- Party: Jacksonian (1829-1845)
- Other political affiliations: Democratic Republican (1823); National Republican (1825–1829)

Timothy Hopkins Porter (November 28, 1785 – December 16, 1845) was an American lawyer and politician from New York.

== Life ==
Born in Waterbury, New Haven County, Connecticut, he was the son of Dr. Timothy Porter (1735–1792) and Margaret (Skinner) Porter (1739–1813). After completing preparatory studies, he then studied law, was admitted to the bar and practiced in Hamilton, New York (now the City of Olean). On November 8, 1811, he married Lucy Moore, and they had twelve children.

He was a member of the New York State Assembly (Allegany and Steuben Co.) in 1816 and 1816–17. He was First Judge of the Cattaraugus County Court from 1817 to 1820. He was a member of the New York State Senate (8th D.) in 1823. He was District Attorney of Cattaraugus County from 1824 to 1827. In 1824, he was elected a presidential elector, but did not attend the meeting of the New York Electoral College, and William Mann, of Schoharie County was appointed to fill the vacancy.

Porter was elected as an Adams candidate to the 19th United States Congress, holding office from March 4, 1825, to March 3, 1827. He was again a member of the State Senate (8th D.) from 1828 to 1831, sitting in the 51st, 52nd, 53rd and 54th New York State Legislatures; and of the State Assembly (Cattaraugus Co.) in 1838 and 1840.

He died in Olean, Cattaraugus County, New York and was buried at the Mount View Cemetery in Olean.

== Sources ==
- United States Congress. "Timothy H. Porter (id: P000448)". Biographical Directory of the United States Congress.
- The New York Civil List compiled by Franklin Benjamin Hough (pages 71, 125, 127ff, 144, 190f, 220, 223, 298, 326 and 358; Weed, Parsons and Co., 1858)
- Original Portraits and Biographies of the Old Pioneers and Congressmen of Cattaraugus County compiled by John Manley (1857; pages 102f)
- The History of Waterbury, Connecticut by Henry Bronson ( pages 520ff)
- Death notice transcribed from the Cattaraugus Republican (issue of December 22, 1845)

New York State Senate
Preceded by new district	New York State Senate; Eighth District (Class 1); 1823	Succeeded by James McCall
Preceded by James McCall	New York State Senate; Eighth District (Class 1); 1828–1831	Succeeded by John Birdsall
U.S. House of Representatives
Preceded by William Woods	Member of the U.S. House of Representatives from New York's 28th congressional district 1825–1827	Succeeded by John Magee
