= Clarkson Crolius =

American politician

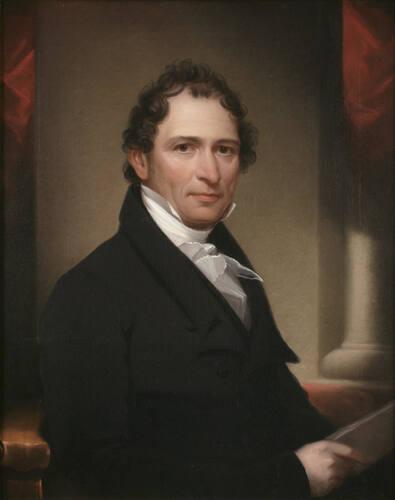
- Born: New York City
- Baptised: October 30, 1774
- Died: October 3, 1843; New York City
- Children: Clarkson Crolius Jr.

Clarkson Crolius (bapt. October 30, 1774 – October 3, 1843) was an American businessman and politician.

== Life ==
Born in New York City, Clarkson Crolius was the son of Johannes (John) Crolius and Maria Clarkson Crolius. His grandfather Johan Willem (William) Crolius, a manufacturer of stoneware, is said to have come from Germany to New York, and ran a pottery on Reade Street, near Broadway. William's son John Crolius acquired property on Reade Street, about one hundred feet (30 m) west of Centre Street, where the pottery and the family residence were maintained for many years, until Clarkson Crolius removed the works to 65 and 67 Bayard Street, the home still remaining in Reade Street.

In 1811, as Grand Sachem of the Tammany Society, he laid the foundation stone of the old Tammany Hall in Frankfort Street.

At the beginning of the War of 1812, he was a major in the Twenty-seventh Regiment of the State Militia, but resigned his commission and received an appointment to the same rank in the regular service. He finished the war as a colonel.

He was an alderman of New York City for many years. He was a member of the New York State Assembly from New York County in 1806, 1807, from 1816 to 1822, in 1824 and 1825, and was Speaker in 1825.

In 1830, he was one of the incorporators of the Canajoharie and Catskill Railroad.

In 1831, he was the leader of the National Republican Party in New York City.

He married Elizabeth Meyer (c. 1774–1856). Their son, Clarkson Crolius Jr. (born 1801), discontinued the manufacture of stoneware in Bayard Street in 1845, and the pottery was afterwards demolished. Crolius Jr. served as alderman for the Sixth Ward and as State Senator for New York's Fourth Senate District.

Crolius died at his home in New York City on October 3, 1843.

== Sources ==
- History of the NY Fire Department
- Art Inventory
- Early Railroad history
- Google Books The New York Civil List compiled by Franklin B. Hough (Weed, Parsons & Co., Albany NY, 1858)

Political offices
Preceded by Richard Goodell	Speaker of the New York State Assembly; 1825	Succeeded by Samuel Young
