= Heman J. Redfield =

American politician (1788–1877)

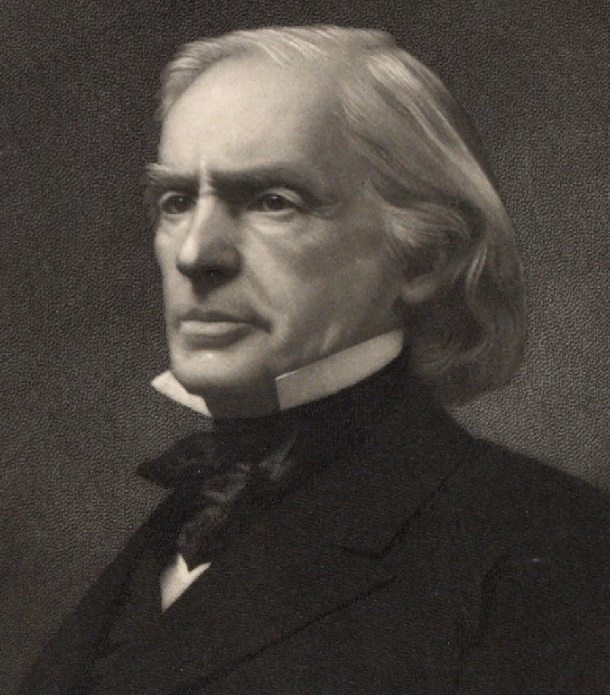

Collector of the Port of New York
- In office 1853 – July 1, 1857
- Appointed by: Franklin Pierce
- Preceded by: Greene C. Bronson
- Succeeded by: Augustus Schell

Member of the New York State Senate for the 8th District
- In office January 1, 1823 – December 31, 1825
- Succeeded by: Ethan B. Allen

Personal details
- Born: Heman Judd Redfield; December 27, 1788 Suffield, Connecticut
- Died: July 22, 1877 (aged 88) Batavia, New York
- Party: Democratic-Republican; Democrat
- Spouses: Abigail N. Gould (m. 1817; died 1841) Constance C. Bolles (m. 1846)
- Children: 18
- Education: Canandaigua Academy

Military service
- Allegiance: United States
- Rank: Private
- Battles/wars: War of 1812: • Battle of Queenston Heights

Heman Judd Redfield (December 27, 1788 – July 22, 1877) was an American politician from New York.

== Life ==
Redfield was born on December 27, 1788, in Suffield, Hartford County, Connecticut. He was the son of Peleg Redfield (1762–1852) and Mary (Judd) Redfield (1765–1844). The family were neighbors of Oliver Phelps who opened a land sales office in Suffield, Connecticut, after the Phelps and Gorham Purchase. The Redfields exchanged their small property in Suffield for 200 acres (0.81 km^{2}) of land in the Town of Farmington (in that part that was later separated as Manchester, Ontario County, New York) and moved to the West in 1800.

He attended Canandaigua Academy from 1808 to 1810, and then studied law with John Canfield Spencer.

== Career ==
During the War of 1812, he enlisted as a private and fought in the Battle of Queenston Heights, and in November 1813 at Fort George, Ontario where he received from the commanding general William Henry Harrison a brevet for gallant services.

He was admitted to the bar in 1815, and commenced practice at Le Roy.

He was appointed District Attorney of Genesee County in 1821. He was Postmaster of Le Roy for more than twenty years. He was a member of the New York State Senate from 1823 to 1825, representing the eighth district which consisted of Allegany, Cattaraugus, Chautauqua, Erie, Genesee, Livingston, Monroe, Niagara and Steuben counties.

In 1826, he was offered the position of Special Counsel to the New York State Attorney General for the trials against the abductors of William Morgan, but declined, recommending John Canfield Spencer who was chosen.

On May 9, 1835, Redfield was elected a Canal Commissioner by the New York State Legislature to fill the vacancy caused by the resignation of Michael Hoffman, but he declined to take office. The Legislature adjourned on May 11, and left Governor William L. Marcy to appoint John Bowman instead.

When the Holland Land Company sold out their land in 1836, he became land agent for the new proprietors and moved to Batavia, New York.

President Franklin Pierce appointed Redfield Naval Officer of the Port of New York, and on November 1, 1853, Collector of the Port of New York. He resigned on July 1, 1857, and retired from politics.

== Personal life ==
On January 27, 1817, he married Abigail Noyes Gould (1795–1841), and they had fourteen children.

On April 14, 1846, he married Constance Collins Bolles (1813–1909), and they had four children.

Redfield died in Batavia, New York on July 22, 1877.

Political offices
Preceded by Greene C. Bronson	Collector of the Port of New York; 1853–1857	Succeeded by Augustus Schell
New York State Senate
Preceded by	New York State Senate; Eighth District (Class 3); 1823–1825	Succeeded by Ethan B. Allen
