= John Bowman (New York politician) =

American politician (1782–1853)

John Bowman (August 29, 1782 in Peekskill, Westchester County, New York – September 14, 1853 in Clarkson, Monroe County, New York) was an American lawyer, banker and politician from New York.

== Life ==
He was the son of John Bowman and Ann Drake (1760–1831). On February 9, 1812, he married Lovice McCarty (1792–1870) at Colchester, Connecticut, and they had five children.

He was a delegate to the New York State Constitutional Convention of 1821. He was a member from Monroe County of the New York State Assembly in 1823.

From 1824 to 1826, he was Bucktails member of the New York State Senate where he introduced on April 12, 1824, the motion to remove Ex-Governor DeWitt Clinton from the Erie Canal Commission. Clinton had been the driving force behind the Erie Canal construction, but was hated by the Bucktails. The maneuver backfired, since the indignation caused by this ungrateful political move led to Clinton's re-election as Governor of New York in November of the same year.

In May 1835, Bowman was appointed a canal commissioner by Governor William L. Marcy to the vacancy caused by the declination to take office of Heman J. Redfield. Redfield had been elected to the vacancy caused by the resignation of Michael Hoffman two days before the adjournment of the New York State Legislature. In January 1836, the recess appointment was confirmed by the State Legislature, and Bowman remained in office until February 1840 when the new Whig majority removed all Democratic commissioners.

He was buried at the West Clarkson Cemetery in Clarkson, NY.

His son John M. Bowman (1817–1892) was part-owner of the Bacchus & Bowman factory in Brockport, New York which manufactured McCormick reapers.

== Sources ==
- The removal of Clinton in De Witt Clinton and the Rise of the People's Men by Craig & Mary L. Hanyan (McGill-Queen's Press - MQUP, 1996, ISBN 0-7735-1434-1, ISBN 978-0-7735-1434-8 ; pages 184ff)
- His son's obit, in NYT on February 7, 1892
- The New York Civil List compiled by Franklin Benjamin Hough (pages 42, 57, 125f, 139, 199 and 260; Weed, Parsons and Co., 1858)
- Political Graveyard
- Genealogy Forum
