= William Nelson (New York politician) =

American lawyer and judge (1784–1869)

Member of the U.S. House of Representatives from New York's 7th district
- In office March 4, 1847 – March 3, 1851
- Preceded by: Joseph H. Anderson
- Succeeded by: Abraham P. Stephens

Personal details
- Born: June 29, 1784 Hyde Park, New York, U.S.
- Died: October 3, 1869 (aged 85) Peekskill, New York, U.S.
- Party: Whig
- Spouse: Cornelia Mandeville Hardman
- Children: 12
- Profession: Attorney

William Nelson (June 29, 1784 – October 3, 1869) was an American lawyer and judge from Westchester County, New York. He represented New York in the U.S. Congress from 1847 to 1851.

== Biography ==
Born in Hyde Park, Dutchess County, New York, on June 29, 1784, Nelson attended the common schools and was graduated from Poughkeepsie Academy. He studied law and was admitted to the bar in 1807, and commenced practice in Peekskill, Westchester County, New York. He married Cornelia Mandeville Hardman, and they had 12 children.

== Career ==
Nelson was a member of New York state assembly from Westchester County from 1819 to 1821. He was a member of the New York state senate, 2nd District, from 1824 to 1827. He was a state court judge for the correction of errors in New York from 1824 to 1827. For thirty years he served as district attorney for Putnam, Rockland, and Westchester Counties.

Elected as a Whig to the Thirtieth and Thirty-first Congresses as U.S. Representative from New York for the 7th District, Nelson served from March 4, 1847 – March 3, 1851. He resumed the practice of his profession.

== Death ==
Nelson died in Peekskill, Westchester County, New York, on October 3, 1869. He is interred at Hillside Cemetery, Cortlandt town, Westchester County, New York.

U.S. House of Representatives
Preceded by Joseph H. Anderson	Member of the U.S. House of Representatives from New York's 7th congressional district 1847–1851	Succeeded by Abraham P. Stephens
