= Jacob Haight =

American politician

Jacob Haight (March 4, 1775 or 1776 – c. 1860 in Catskill, Greene County, New York) was an American politician.

== Life ==
He was a member of the New York State Senate from 1824 to 1827. In 1828, he was among the incorporators of the Catskill and Ithaca Railroad which was never built. He was New York State Treasurer from 1839 to 1842.

== Sources ==
- Political Graveyard
- The New York Civil List compiled by Franklin Benjamin Hough (pages 35 and 141; Weed, Parsons and Co., 1858) (Google Books)
- Early railroads, at Catskill Archive
- A Genealogical History of the Hoyt, Haight, and Hight Families by David Webster Hoyt (Printed for the author by the Providence Press Co., 1871; page 606)

Political offices
Preceded by Gamaliel H. Barstow	New York State Treasurer; 1839–1842	Succeeded by Thomas Farrington
