= David Gardiner (politician) =

American politician (1784–1844)

Member of the New York State Senate for Suffolk County
- In office January 1, 1824 – December 31, 1828
- Preceded by: John Alsop King
- Succeeded by: John I. Schenck

Personal details
- Born: May 29, 1784 East Hampton, New York, U.S.
- Died: February 28, 1844 (aged 59) Fort Washington, Maryland, U.S.
- Party: People's Party
- Spouse: Juliana McLachlan (m. 1815)
- Children: 4, including Julia Gardiner
- Education: Yale University (1804)

David Gardiner (May 29, 1784 – February 28, 1844) was an American lawyer and politician who served as a member of New York State Senate from 1824 to 1828. He was the father of Julia Gardiner Tyler, second wife of U.S. President John Tyler. He died in an explosion aboard the USS Princeton.

== Early life ==
Gardiner was born on May 29, 1784, the son of Abraham Gardiner (1763–1796) and Phebe Dayton (1757–1810). He was a descendant of Lion Gardiner (1599–1663) who was an early English settler and soldier that founded the first English settlement in what became the state of New York on Long Island, including Gardiners Island. He graduated from Yale University in 1804 along with future U.S. Senator from South Carolina, John Calhoun.

== Career ==
Gardiner practiced law for several years, but beginning in 1815 when he married Juliana McLachlan, one of the wealthiest women in New York, he also managed her extensive real estate holdings in Manhattan. He was elected to one four-year term as a member of the New York State Senate representing the 1st District of Suffolk County from 1824 to 1828. Gardiner was a supporter of John Quincy Adams, member of the People's Party, which was opposed to the emerging Democratic Party, led by Andrew Jackson.

He later lived at 430 Lafayette Street in Manhanttan, "when that section was one of the social centres of the city".

In the 1840s, he took his family to Washington, D.C., for several months of the year, in part to find an appropriate husband for his daughter Julia. His family became part of the social circle of President John Tyler and his family.

=== Death aboard the Princeton ===
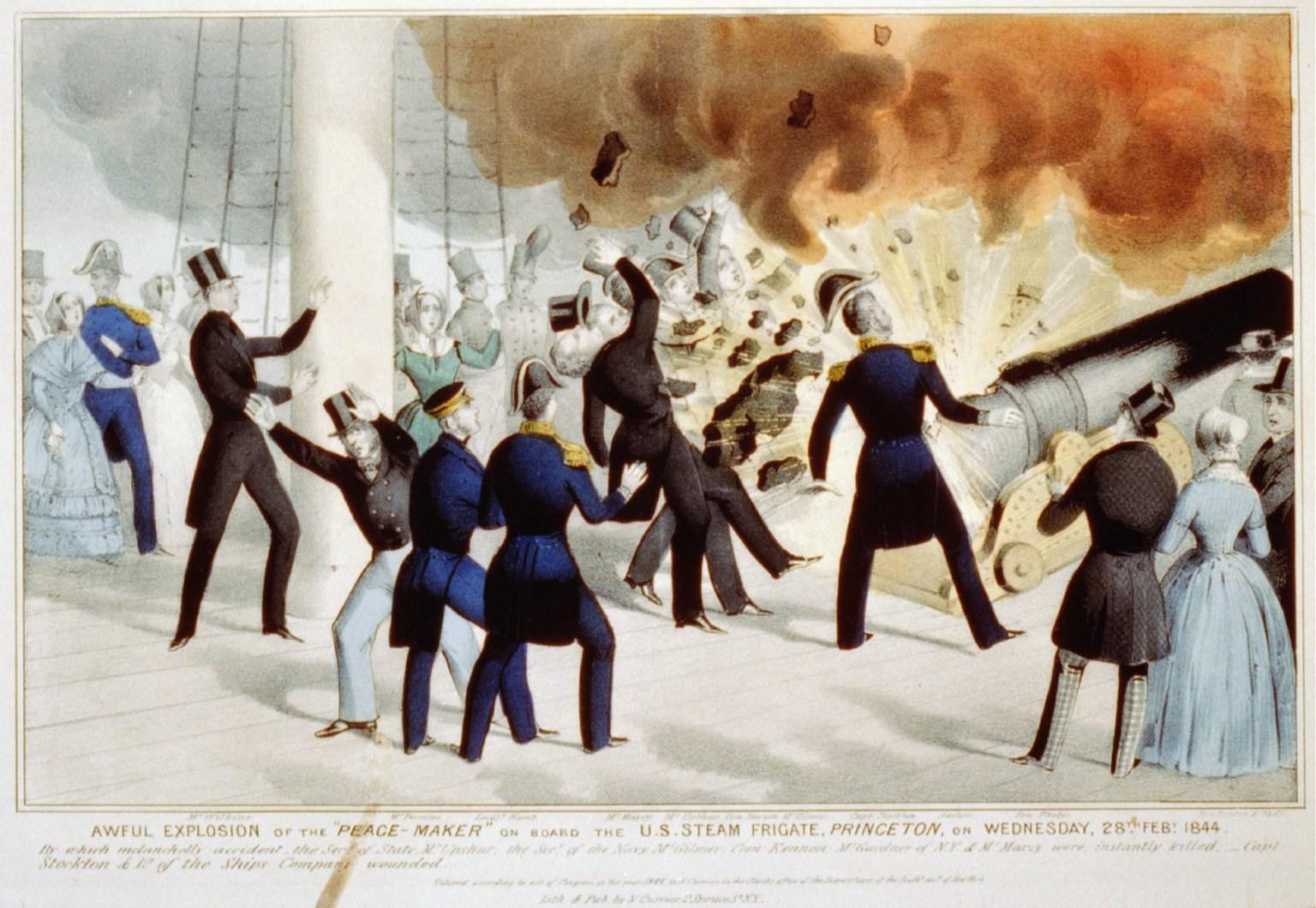
Contemporary Currier & Ives lithograph depicting the explosion

Gardiner died in an explosion aboard the USS Princeton on February 28, 1844. President Tyler had proposed to his daughter Julia in February 1843. She had refused him at first but sometime in 1843 they agreed to marry at some future time out of respect for the fact that the President had only been a widow since September 1842. David Gardiner and his daughters Julia and Margaret were aboard a pleasure cruise on the Potomac River. As the USS Princeton neared Mount Vernon, the world's biggest naval gun, The Peacemaker, which was being demonstrated, exploded, killing Gardiner and five others. Funeral services for the five white victims were held in the East Room of the White House. Gardiner was interred in the Public Vault at the Congressional Cemetery in Washington, D.C. His remains were later moved to the Gardiner family plot at the South End Cemetery in East Hampton, New York.

President Tyler proposed marriage several more times before being accepted. He and Julia Gardiner wed on June 26, 1844. They named their first child David Gardiner Tyler in honor of his maternal grandfather.

== Personal life ==
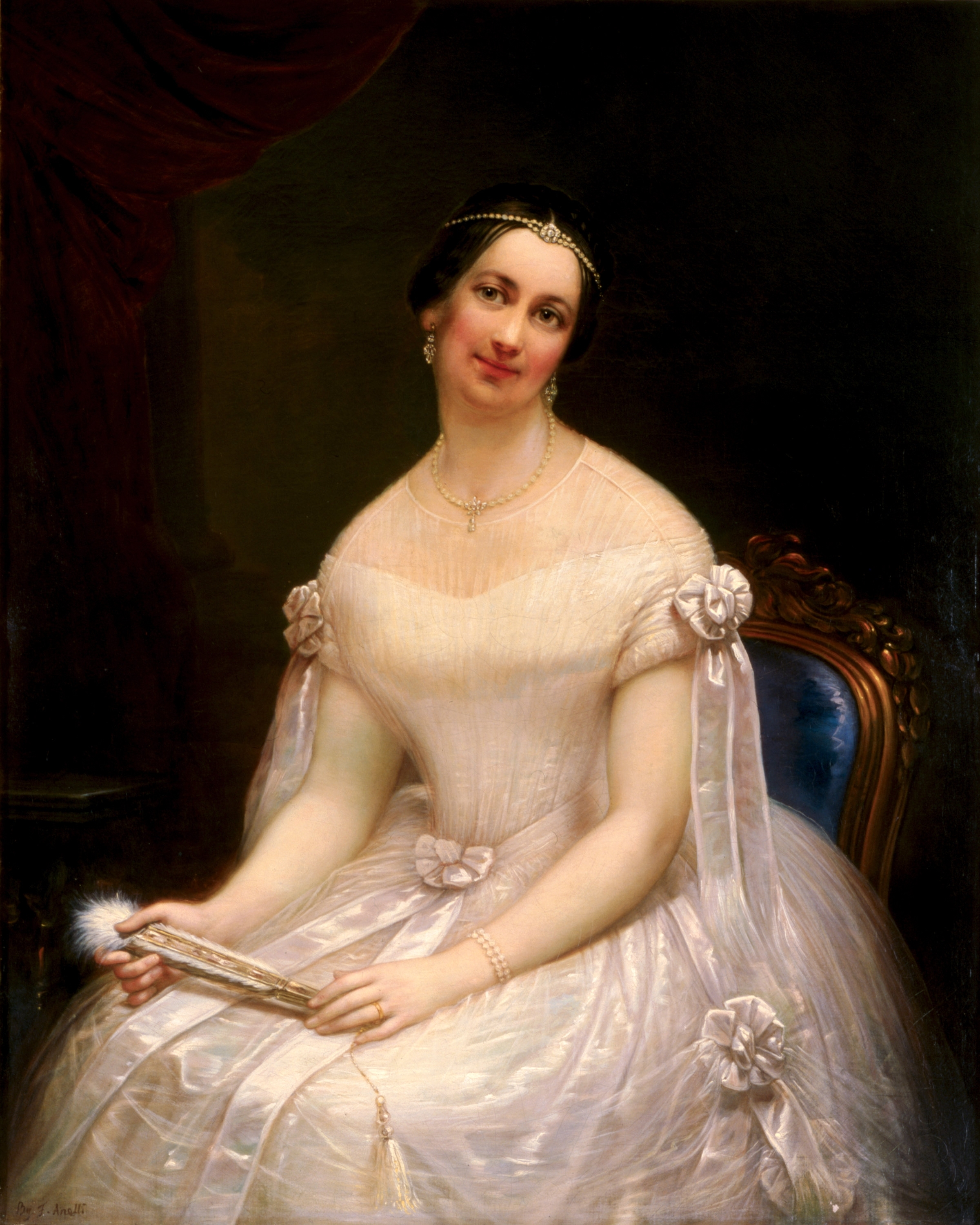
Portrait of Gardiner's daughter, Julia, September 1844

In 1815, he married Juliana McLachlan (1799–1864), the daughter of Michael McLachlan, who was born and raised in Jamaica, West Indies. His father had been a Scottish warrior in the Battle of Culloden in 1746, between the Jacobites and the military forces in the service of King of England, who was beheaded. The family moved from Jamaica to New York and established a successful brewery in lower Manhattan that led to their purchase of some thirteen pieces of commercial and residential Manhattan real estate, which Juliana inherited, making her one of the wealthiest women in New York.

The Gardiners lived for several years on Gardiners Island in East Hampton, New York, though David did not belong to the branch of the Gardiner family that owned that eponymous island. Together, they were the parents of:

- David Lion Gardiner (1816–1892), Princeton College graduate and lawyer and Gold Rush investor who owned Sagtikos Manor, and who married a distant cousin, Sarah Gardiner Thompson.
- Alexander Gardiner (1818–1851), who was the Clerk of the U.S. Circuit Court and an unofficial aide to President Tyler.
- Julia Gardiner (1820–1889), who married the 10th U.S. President John Tyler (1790–1862), shortly after Gardiner's death aboard the USS Princeton
- Margaret Gardiner (1822–1857), who married John H. Beeckman (d. 1850) on January 8, 1848. He was a New York merchant and the cousin of Henry Beeckman Livingston who both set up a mercantile operating during the Gold Rush.

=== Descendants ===
His grandchildren include: David Gardiner Tyler (1846–1927), a lawyer and public official, John Alexander Tyler (1848–1883), an engineer who was appointed U.S. surveyor of the Interior Department in 1879, and Dr. Lyon Gardiner Tyler (1853–1935), an author and legislator.

New York State Senate
Preceded by John Alsop King	New York State Senate; First district (Class 1); 1824-1828	Succeeded by John I. Schenck
