= 58th New York State Legislature =

New York state legislative session

←	57th	59th	→
- The Old State Capitol (1879)

Overview
- Legislative body: New York State Legislature
- Jurisdiction: New York, United States
- Term: January 1 – December 31, 1835

Senate
- Members: 32
- President: Lt. Gov. John Tracy (D)
- Party control: Democratic (28-4)

Assembly
- Members: 128
- Speaker: Charles Humphrey (D)
- Party control: Democratic (94-33)

Sessions
- 1st: January 6 – May 11, 1835

The 58th New York State Legislature, consisting of the New York State Senate and the New York State Assembly, met from January 6 to May 11, 1835, during the third year of William L. Marcy's governorship, in Albany.

== Background ==
Under the provisions of the New York Constitution of 1821, 32 senators were elected on general tickets in eight senatorial districts for four-year terms. They were divided into four classes, and every year eight Senate seats came up for election. Assemblymen were elected countywide on general tickets to a one-year term, the whole Assembly being renewed annually.

State Senator John Birdsall resigned on June 5; and State Senator Louis Hasbrouck died on August 20, 1834; leaving vacancies in the Fourth and Eighth District.

Surveyor General Simeon De Witt died on December 3, 1834, leaving a vacancy to be filled by the Legislature.

At this time there were two political parties: the Democratic Party and the Whig Party.

The Whig state convention nominated State Senator William H. Seward for Governor, and Silas M. Stilwell for Lieutenant Governor.

The Democratic state convention met on September 10 at Herkimer and nominated Gov. Marcy and Lt. Gov. Tracy for re-election.

== Elections ==
The State election was held from November 3 to 5, 1834. Gov. William L. Marcy and Lt. Gov. John Tracy were re-elected.

Coe S. Downing (1st D.), John P. Jones (2nd D.), Abraham L. Lawyer (3rd D.), Samuel Young (4th D.), Abijah Beckwith (5th D.), Levi Beardsley (6th D.), Chester Loomis (7th D.), Isaac Lacey (8th D.); and Assemblymen Jabez Willes (4th D.) and Chauncey J. Fox (8th D.) were elected to the Senate. Lacey and Fox were Whigs, the other eight were Democrats.

== Sessions ==
The Legislature met for the regular session at the Old State Capitol in Albany on January 6, 1835; and adjourned on May 11.

Charles Humphrey (D) was elected Speaker with 91 votes against 31 for Mark H. Sibley (W).

Upon taking their seats in the Senate, Young and Willes (4th D.), and Fox and Lacey (8th D.), drew lots to decide which one of the two senators elected in each district would serve the short term, and which one the full term. Young and Fox drew the short term, and Willes and Lacey the full term.

On January 20, the Legislature elected William Campbell as Surveyor General; and Amasa J. Parker as a regent of the University of the State of New York.

On February 2, the Legislature re-elected Attorney General Greene C. Bronson and State Treasurer Abraham Keyser.

On May 6, Canal Commissioner Michael Hoffman resigned.

On May 9, the Legislature elected Heman J. Redfield to succeed Hoffman; and Washington Irving as a regent of the University of the State of New York. Redfield declined to take office, and Gov. Marcy appointed John Bowman to fill the vacancy temporarily.

== State Senate ==
=== Districts ===
- The First District (4 seats) consisted of Kings, New York, Queens, Richmond and Suffolk counties.
- The Second District (4 seats) consisted of Delaware, Dutchess, Orange, Putnam, Rockland, Sullivan, Ulster and Westchester counties.
- The Third District (4 seats) consisted of Albany, Columbia, Greene, Rensselaer, Schenectady and Schoharie counties.
- The Fourth District (4 seats) consisted of Clinton, Essex, Franklin, Hamilton, Montgomery, St. Lawrence, Saratoga, Warren and Washington counties.
- The Fifth District (4 seats) consisted of Herkimer, Jefferson, Lewis, Madison, Oneida and Oswego counties.
- The Sixth District (4 seats) consisted of Broome, Chenango, Cortland, Otsego, Steuben, Tioga and Tompkins counties.
- The Seventh District (4 seats) consisted of Cayuga, Onondaga, Ontario, Seneca, Wayne and Yates counties.
- The Eighth District (4 seats) consisted of Allegany, Cattaraugus, Chautauqua, Erie, Genesee, Livingston, Monroe, Niagara and Orleans counties.
Note: There are now 62 counties in the State of New York. The counties which are not mentioned in this list had not yet been established, or sufficiently organized, the area being included in one or more of the abovementioned counties.

=== Members ===
The asterisk (*) denotes members of the previous Legislature who continued in office as members of this Legislature. Jabez Willes and Chauncey J. Fox changed from the Assembly to the Senate.

District	Senators	Term left	Party	Notes
First	Harman B. Cropsey*	1 year	Democrat	
First	Myndert Van Schaick*	2 years	Democrat	
First	Charles L. Livingston*	3 years	Democrat	
First	Coe S. Downing	4 years	Democrat	
Second	Allan Macdonald*	1 year	Democrat	also Postmaster of White Plains
Second	John Sudam*	2 years	Democrat	died on April 13, 1835
Second	Leonard Maison*	3 years	Democrat	
Second	John P. Jones	4 years	Democrat	
Third	John W. Edmonds*	1 year	Democrat	
Third	Peter Gansevoort*	2 years	Democrat	
Third	John C. Kemble*	3 years	Democrat	
Third	Abraham L. Lawyer	4 years	Democrat	
Fourth	Josiah Fisk*	1 year	Democrat	
Fourth	Samuel Young	2 years	Democrat	elected to fill vacancy, in place of Louis Hasbrouck; also a Canal Commissioner and First Judge of the Saratoga Co. Court
Fourth	Isaac W. Bishop*	3 years	Democrat	
Fourth	Jabez Willes*	4 years	Democrat	
Fifth	Robert Lansing*	1 year	Democrat	
Fifth	John G. Stower*	2 years	Democrat	resigned on September 29, 1835
Fifth	Francis Seger*	3 years	Democrat	
Fifth	Abijah Beckwith	4 years	Democrat	
Sixth	John G. McDowell*	1 year	Democrat	also Postmaster of Chemung
Sixth	John F. Hubbard*	2 years	Democrat	
Sixth	Ebenezer Mack*	3 years	Democrat	
Sixth	Levi Beardsley	4 years	Democrat	
Seventh	Jehiel H. Halsey*	1 year	Democrat	
Seventh	Samuel L. Edwards*	2 years	Democrat	
Seventh	Thomas Armstrong*	3 years	Democrat	
Seventh	Chester Loomis	4 years	Democrat	also Postmaster of Rushville
Eighth	Chauncey J. Fox*	1 year	Whig	elected to fill vacancy, in place of John Birdsall
Eighth	John Griffin*	2 years	Whig	
Eighth	Albert H. Tracy*	3 years	Whig	
Eighth	Isaac Lacey	4 years	Whig	

=== Employees ===
- Clerk: John F. Bacon

== State Assembly ==
=== Districts ===
- Albany County (3 seats)
- Allegany County (1 seat)
- Broome County (1 seat)
- Cattaraugus County (1 seat)
- Cayuga County (4 seats)
- Chautauqua County (2 seats)
- Chenango County (3 seats)
- Clinton County (1 seat)
- Columbia County (3 seats)
- Cortland County (2 seats)
- Delaware County (2 seats)
- Dutchess County (4 seats)
- Erie County (2 seats)
- Essex County (1 seat)
- Franklin County (1 seat)
- Genesee County (3 seats)
- Greene County (2 seats)
- Hamilton and Montgomery counties (3 seats)
- Herkimer County (3 seats)
- Jefferson County (3 seats)
- Kings County (1 seat)
- Lewis County (1 seat)
- Livingston County (2 seats)
- Madison County (3 seats)
- Monroe County (3 seats)
- The City and County of New York (11 seats)
- Niagara County (1 seat)
- Oneida County (5 seats)
- Onondaga County (4 seats)
- Ontario County (3 seats)
- Orange County (3 seats)
- Orleans County (1 seat)
- Oswego County (1 seat)
- Otsego County (4 seats)
- Putnam County (1 seat)
- Queens County (1 seat)
- Rensselaer County (4 seats)
- Richmond County (1 seat)
- Rockland County (1 seat)
- St. Lawrence County (2 seats)
- Saratoga County (3 seats)
- Schenectady County (1 seat)
- Schoharie County (2 seats)
- Seneca County (2 seats)
- Steuben County (2 seats)
- Suffolk County (2 seats)
- Sullivan County (1 seat)
- Tioga County (2 seats)
- Tompkins County (3 seats)
- Ulster County (2 seats)
- Warren County (1 seat)
- Washington (3 seats)
- Wayne County (2 seats)
- Westchester County (3 seats)
- Yates County (1 seat)
Note: There are now 62 counties in the State of New York. The counties which are not mentioned in this list had not yet been established, or sufficiently organized, the area being included in one or more of the abovementioned counties.

=== Assemblymen ===
The asterisk (*) denotes members of the previous Legislature who continued as members of this Legislature. Herman I. Quackenboss changed from the Senate to the Assembly.

The party affiliations follow the vote on State officers on January 20, February 2 and May 9.

District	Assemblymen	Party	Notes
Albany	Edward Livingston	Democrat	
Albany	Tobias T. E. Waldron	Whig	
Albany	(Henry G. Wheaton)		Wheaton did not claim or take the seat; contested
Albany	David G. Seger	Democrat	seated on January 9, 1835, in place of Wheaton
Allegany	Alvin Burr	Whig	
Broome	Neri Blatchly	Whig	
Cattaraugus	Albert G. Burke	Whig	
Cayuga	Cornelius Cuykendall*	Democrat	
Cayuga	Andrew Groom*	Democrat	
Cayuga	Noyes Palmer*	Democrat	
Cayuga	Andrews Preston	Democrat	
Chautauqua	Orrin McClure	Whig	
Chautauqua	John Woodward Jr.	Whig	
Chenango	Hendrick Crain	Democrat	
Chenango	Henry Crary	Democrat	
Chenango	Woodward Warren	Democrat	
Clinton	Lemuel Stetson	Democrat	
Columbia	Jacob Shafer	Democrat	
Columbia	Horace Stevens	Democrat	
Columbia	Julius Wilcoxson	Democrat	
Cortland	Aaron Brown	Whig	
Cortland	Barak Niles	Whig	
Delaware	Dubois Burhans	Democrat	
Delaware	William B. Ogden	Democrat	
Dutchess	Theodore V. W. Anthony*	Democrat	
Dutchess	David Barnes Jr.	Democrat	
Dutchess	Stoddard Judd	Democrat	
Dutchess	Stephen Thorn	Democrat	
Erie	William A. Moseley	Whig	
Erie	Ralph Plumb	Whig	
Essex	Thomas A. Tomlinson	Whig	
Franklin	Asa Hascall	Whig	
Genesee	Truman Lewis*	Whig	
Genesee	Samuel Richmond	Whig	
Genesee	Amos Tyrrel Jr.	Whig	
Greene	David Ingersoll	Democrat	
Greene	Anthony Van Bergen	Democrat	
Hamilton and Montgomery	Henry Adams	Democrat	
Hamilton and Montgomery	Ashbel Loomis	Democrat	
Hamilton and Montgomery	Collins Odell	Democrat	
Herkimer	Charles Gray	Democrat	
Herkimer	Peter P. Murphy	Democrat	
Herkimer	Henry Tillinghast	Democrat	
Jefferson	Calvin Clark	Whig	
Jefferson	Eli Farwell	Whig	
Jefferson	Charles Strong	Whig	
Kings	Philip Brasher*	Democrat	
Lewis	Charles Dayan	Democrat	
Livingston	Hollom Hutchinson	Whig	
Livingston	George W. Patterson	Whig	
Madison	Joseph Clark	Democrat	
Madison	William J. Hough	Democrat	
Madison	Jason W. Powers	Democrat	
Monroe	George Brown	Whig	
Monroe	Derick Sibley	Whig	
Monroe	Enoch Strong	Whig	
New York	Thomas N. Carr	Democrat	
New York	Charles P. Clinch	Democrat	
New York	Charles Henry Hall	Democrat	
New York	Job Haskell	Democrat	
New York	Thomas Herttell*	Democrat	
New York	Herman I. Quackenboss*	Democrat	previously a member from Delaware Co., and then from Greene Co.
New York	Christopher C. Rice	Democrat	
New York	Benjamin Ringgold*	Democrat	
New York	James I. Roosevelt	Democrat	
New York	Prosper M. Wetmore	Democrat	
New York	Andrew C. Wheeler	Democrat	
Niagara	Hiram McNeil	Whig	
Oneida	Merit Brooks	Democrat	
Oneida	Dan P. Cadwell	Democrat	
Oneida	Riley Shepard	Democrat	
Oneida	David Wager	Democrat	
Oneida	Amos Woodworth	Democrat	
Onondaga	David C. Lytle	Democrat	
Onondaga	Sandford C. Parker	Democrat	
Onondaga	George Pettit	Democrat	
Onondaga	John Wilkinson	Democrat	also Postmaster of Syracuse
Ontario	Ariel Hendee	Whig	
Ontario	William Hildreth	Whig	
Ontario	Mark H. Sibley	Whig	
Orange	Merit H. Cash*	Democrat	
Orange	Robert Denniston	Democrat	
Orange	(Robert Fowler)	Democrat	Fowler died before the beginning of the session; James Finch (D) was elected in a special election, and seated on January 23
Orleans	Asa Clark*	Democrat	
Oswego	Jesse Crowell	Democrat	
Otsego	Joseph Carpenter	Democrat	
Otsego	Henry Harvey	Democrat	
Otsego	Cornelius Jones	Democrat	
Otsego	Joseph Peck	Democrat	
Putnam	Daniel Kent	Democrat	
Queens	Thomas B. Jackson*	Democrat	
Rensselaer	Chester Griswold	Democrat	
Rensselaer	Jacob W. Lewis	Whig	
Rensselaer	Daniel Simmons	Whig	
Rensselaer	Martin Springer	Democrat	
Richmond	Lawrence Hillyer	Whig	
Rockland	Edward Suffern	Democrat	
St. Lawrence	Preston King	Democrat	
St. Lawrence	William S. Paddock	Democrat	
Saratoga	Eli Beecher	Democrat	
Saratoga	Asahel Philo	Democrat	
Saratoga	William B. Van Benthuisen	Democrat	resigned on March 11, 1835
Schenectady	David Ostrom	Democrat	
Schoharie	John F. Hiller	Democrat	
Schoharie	Jonas Krum	Democrat	
Seneca	Caleb Barnum	Democrat	
Seneca	John D. Coe*	Democrat	
Steuben	Jeremiah Baker	Democrat	
Steuben	Joshua Healy*	Democrat	
Suffolk	George L. Conklin	Democrat	
Suffolk	George S. Phillips	Democrat	
Sullivan	James Eldred	Democrat	
Tioga	Green Bennet	Democrat	
Tioga	George Fisher	Democrat	
Tompkins	Charles Humphrey*	Democrat	elected Speaker
Tompkins	Parvis A. Williams	Democrat	
Tompkins	Caleb Woodbury	Democrat	
Ulster	Henry I. Davis	Democrat	
Ulster	William Woodworth		
Warren	Truman B. Hicks	Democrat	
Washington	Jonathan K. Horton	Whig	
Washington	George McKie	Whig	
Washington	Allen R. Moore	Whig	
Wayne	Elisha Benjamin	Democrat	
Wayne	William D. Wylie	Democrat	
Westchester	Edwin Crosby*	Democrat	
Westchester	Horatio Lockwood*	Democrat	
Westchester	Prince W. Paddock	Democrat	
Yates	Meredith Mallory	Democrat	

=== Employees ===
- Clerk: Philip Reynolds Jr.
- Sergeant-at-Arms: Daniel Dygert
- Doorkeeper: Nathan Manson Jr.
- Assistant Doorkeeper: James M. D. Carr

== Sources ==
- The New York Civil List compiled by Franklin Benjamin Hough (Weed, Parsons and Co., 1858) [pg. 109 and 441 for Senate districts; pg. 130 for senators; pg. 148f for Assembly districts; pg. 216f for assemblymen]
- The History of Political Parties in the State of New-York, from the Ratification of the Federal Constitution to 1840 by Jabez D. Hammond (4th ed., Vol. 2, Phinney & Co., Buffalo, 1850; pg. 442 to 454)
