= 56th New York State Legislature =

New York state legislative session

←	55th	57th	→
- The Old State Capitol (1879)

Overview
- Legislative body: New York State Legislature
- Jurisdiction: New York, United States
- Term: January 1 – December 31, 1833

Senate
- Members: 32
- President: Lt. Gov. John Tracy (J)
- Party control: Jacksonian (25-7)

Assembly
- Members: 128
- Speaker: Charles L. Livingston (J)
- Party control: Jacksonian (101-27)

Sessions
- 1st: January 1 – April 30, 1833

The 56th New York State Legislature, consisting of the New York State Senate and the New York State Assembly, met from January 1 to April 30, 1833, during the first year of William L. Marcy's governorship, in Albany.

== Background ==
Under the provisions of the New York Constitution of 1821, 32 Senators were elected on general tickets in eight senatorial districts for four-year terms. They were divided into four classes, and every year eight Senate seats came up for election. Assemblymen were elected countywide on general tickets to a one-year term, the whole Assembly being renewed annually.

At this time, there were three political parties: the Jacksonian Democrats, the Anti-Masonic Party, and the National Republican Party.

The Anti-Masonic state convention met on June 21, and nominated again Assemblyman Francis Granger for governor and Samuel Stevens, of New York City, for lieutenant governor. They also nominated a full ticket of presidential electors, apparently composed of some supporters of William Wirt, and some of Henry Clay, but not pledged to any candidate.

The National Republican state convention met on July 26, Ambrose Spencer was chairman. They endorsed The Anti-Masonic nominees Granger and Stevens. They also endorsed the ticket of presidential electors nominated by the Anti-Masons, who—if they won the election—should vote for Henry Clay if this would help to defeat Jackson, otherwise for Wirt. In effect, both parties were in the process of merging, forming an Anti-Jacksonian bloc which eventually became the Whig Party.

The Jacksonian state convention met on September 19 at Herkimer, Samuel Young was chairman. They nominated U.S. Senator William L. Marcy for governor, and Judge John Tracy for lieutenant governor.

== Elections ==
The state election was held from November 5 to 7, 1832. William L. Marcy and John Tracy were elected governor and lieutenant governor; and the Andrew Jackson/Martin Van Buren electoral ticket won.

State Senator John F. Hubbard (6th D.) was re-elected. John Sudam (2nd D.), Peter Gansevoort (3rd D.), Louis Hasbrouck (4th D.), John G. Stower (5th D.), Samuel L. Edwards (7th D.), John Griffin (8th D.) and Assemblyman Myndert Van Schaick (1st D.) were also elected to the Senate. Griffin and Hasbrouck were Anti-Jacksonians, the other six were Jacksonians.

== Sessions ==
The Legislature met for the regular session at the Old State Capitol in Albany on January 1, 1833; and adjourned on April 30.

Charles L. Livingston (D) was re-elected Speaker with 99 votes against 22 for John C. Spencer (A-M).

On January 4, the Legislature elected State Comptroller Silas Wright, Jr. to the U.S. Senate, to fill the vacancy caused by the resignation of Gov. Marcy. Wright resigned the office of Comptroller on January 7.

On January 11, the Legislature elected Secretary of State Azariah C. Flagg to succeed Wright as State Comptroller. Flagg resigned the office of Secretary of State on January 12.

On January 15, the Legislature elected Adjutant General John Adams Dix to succeed Flagg as Secretary of State.

On February 4, the Legislature re-elected State Treasurer Abraham Keyser, Jr.

On February 5, the Legislature elected State Senator Nathaniel P. Tallmadge to succeed Charles E. Dudley as U.S. Senator for a six-year term beginning on March 4, 1833.

On February 21, the Legislature passed "An act for the construction of the Chenango Canal".

On March 23, the Legislature passed "An act authorising the appointment of an additional Canal Commissioner", and on April 4, the Legislature elected Michael Hoffman as such.

== State Senate ==
=== Districts ===
- The First District (4 seats) consisted of Kings, New York, Queens, Richmond and Suffolk counties.
- The Second District (4 seats) consisted of Delaware, Dutchess, Orange, Putnam, Rockland, Sullivan, Ulster and Westchester counties.
- The Third District (4 seats) consisted of Albany, Columbia, Greene, Rensselaer, Schenectady and Schoharie counties.
- The Fourth District (4 seats) consisted of Clinton, Essex, Franklin, Hamilton, Montgomery, St. Lawrence, Saratoga, Warren and Washington counties.
- The Fifth District (4 seats) consisted of Herkimer, Jefferson, Lewis, Madison, Oneida and Oswego counties.
- The Sixth District (4 seats) consisted of Broome, Chenango, Cortland, Otsego, Steuben, Tioga and Tompkins counties.
- The Seventh District (4 seats) consisted of Cayuga, Onondaga, Ontario, Seneca, Wayne and Yates counties.
- The Eighth District (4 seats) consisted of Allegany, Cattaraugus, Chautauqua, Erie, Genesee, Livingston, Monroe, Niagara and Orleans counties.
Note: There are now 62 counties in the State of New York. The counties which are not mentioned in this list had not yet been established, or sufficiently organized, the area being included in one or more of the abovementioned counties.

=== Members ===
The asterisk (*) denotes members of the previous Legislature who continued in office as members of this Legislature. Myndert Van Schaick changed from the Assembly to the Senate.

District	Senators	Term left	Party	Notes
First	Alpheus Sherman*	1 year	Jacksonian	
First	Jonathan S. Conklin*	2 years	Jacksonian	
First	Harman B. Cropsey*	3 years	Jacksonian	
First	Myndert Van Schaick*	4 years	Jacksonian	
Second	Nathaniel P. Tallmadge*	1 year	Jacksonian	on February 5, 1833, elected to the U.S. Senate, and resigned his seat on February 20
Second	David M. Westcott*	2 years	Jacksonian	
Second	Allan Macdonald*	3 years	Jacksonian	also Postmaster of White Plains
Second	John Sudam	4 years	Jacksonian	
Third	William Dietz*	1 year	Jacksonian	
Third	Herman I. Quackenboss*	2 years	Jacksonian	
Third	John W. Edmonds*	3 years	Jacksonian	until February 1833, also Recorder of the City of Hudson
Third	Peter Gansevoort	4 years	Jacksonian	
Fourth	Isaac Gere*	1 year	Jacksonian	
Fourth	William I. Dodge*	2 years	Jacksonian	
Fourth	Josiah Fisk*	3 years	Jacksonian	
Fourth	Louis Hasbrouck	4 years	Anti-Jacksonian	
Fifth	Alvin Bronson*	1 year	Jacksonian	
Fifth	Henry A. Foster*	2 years	Jacksonian	
Fifth	Robert Lansing*	3 years	Jacksonian	
Fifth	John G. Stower	4 years	Jacksonian	
Sixth	Levi Beardsley*	1 year	Jacksonian	
Sixth	Charles W. Lynde*	2 years	Anti-Jacksonian	
Sixth	John G. McDowell*	3 years	Jacksonian	also Postmaster of Chemung
Sixth	John F. Hubbard*	4 years	Jacksonian	
Seventh	Thomas Armstrong*	1 year	Jacksonian	also Supervisor of Butler, and Chairman of the Board of Supervisors of Wayne Co.
Seventh	William H. Seward*	2 years	Anti-Jacksonian	
Seventh	Jehiel H. Halsey*	3 years	Jacksonian	
Seventh	Samuel L. Edwards	4 years	Jacksonian	until February 1, 1833, also First Judge of Onondaga Co.
Eighth	Albert H. Tracy*	1 year	Anti-Jacksonian	
Eighth	Trumbull Cary*	2 years	Anti-Jacksonian	
Eighth	John Birdsall*	3 years	Anti-Jacksonian	
Eighth	John Griffin	4 years	Anti-Jacksonian	until April 26, 1833, also First Judge of Allegany Co.

=== Employees ===
- Clerk: John F. Bacon

== State Assembly ==
=== Districts ===
- Albany County (3 seats)
- Allegany County (1 seat)
- Broome County (1 seat)
- Cattaraugus County (1 seat)
- Cayuga County (4 seats)
- Chautauqua County (2 seats)
- Chenango County (3 seats)
- Clinton County (1 seat)
- Columbia County (3 seats)
- Cortland County (2 seats)
- Delaware County (2 seats)
- Dutchess County (4 seats)
- Erie County (2 seats)
- Essex County (1 seat)
- Franklin County (1 seat)
- Genesee County (3 seats)
- Greene County (2 seats)
- Hamilton and Montgomery counties (3 seats)
- Herkimer County (3 seats)
- Jefferson County (3 seats)
- Kings County (1 seat)
- Lewis County (1 seat)
- Livingston County (2 seats)
- Madison County (3 seats)
- Monroe County (3 seats)
- The City and County of New York (11 seats)
- Niagara County (1 seat)
- Oneida County (5 seats)
- Onondaga County (4 seats)
- Ontario County (3 seats)
- Orange County (3 seats)
- Orleans County (1 seat)
- Oswego County (1 seat)
- Otsego County (4 seats)
- Putnam County (1 seat)
- Queens County (1 seat)
- Rensselaer County (4 seats)
- Richmond County (1 seat)
- Rockland County (1 seat)
- St. Lawrence County (2 seats)
- Saratoga County (3 seats)
- Schenectady County (1 seat)
- Schoharie County (2 seats)
- Seneca County (2 seats)
- Steuben County (2 seats)
- Suffolk County (2 seats)
- Sullivan County (1 seat)
- Tioga County (2 seats)
- Tompkins County (3 seats)
- Ulster County (2 seats)
- Warren County (1 seat)
- Washington (3 seats)
- Wayne County (2 seats)
- Westchester County (3 seats)
- Yates County (1 seat)
Note: There are now 62 counties in the State of New York. The counties which are not mentioned in this list had not yet been established, or sufficiently organized, the area being included in one or more of the abovementioned counties.

=== Assemblymen ===
The asterisk (*) denotes members of the previous Legislature who continued as members of this Legislature.

The party affiliations follow the vote on U.S. senators and other State officers on January 4, 11 and 15; February 4 and 5; and April 4.

District	Assemblymen	Party	Notes
Albany	Edward Livingston	Jacksonian	
Albany	Jacob Settle	Jacksonian	
Albany	Israel Shear	Jacksonian	
Allegany	John B. Collins*	Anti-Jacksonian	
Broome	Vincent Whitney*	Anti-Jacksonian	
Cattaraugus	Chauncey J. Fox	Anti-Jacksonian	
Cayuga	John Beardsley*	Jacksonian	
Cayuga	George H. Brinkerhoff*	Jacksonian	
Cayuga	Simon Lathrop	Jacksonian	
Cayuga	John W. Sawyer*	Jacksonian	
Chautauqua	Alvin Plumb	Anti-Jacksonian	
Chautauqua	Nathaniel Gray	Anti-Jacksonian	
Chenango	Abel Chandler	Jacksonian	
Chenango	Austin Hyde	Jacksonian	
Chenango	William M. Patterson	Jacksonian	
Clinton	Miles Stevenson	Jacksonian	
Columbia	Anthony Boucher	Jacksonian	
Columbia	Bastian C. Lasher	Jacksonian	
Columbia	John Murdock	Jacksonian	
Cortland	Enos S. Halbert	Anti-Jacksonian	
Cortland	David Mathews	Anti-Jacksonian	
Delaware	John Edgerton	Jacksonian	
Delaware	Stoddard Stevens	Jacksonian	
Dutchess	Daniel D. Akin	Jacksonian	
Dutchess	Joel Brown	Jacksonian	
Dutchess	Henry Conklin	Jacksonian	
Dutchess	George Lambert	Jacksonian	
Erie	Horace Clark*	Anti-Jacksonian	
Erie	William Mills*	Anti-Jacksonian	
Essex	Almerin Smith	Anti-Jacksonian	
Franklin	Jabez Parkhurst	Anti-Jacksonian	
Genesee	Peter Patterson	Anti-Jacksonian	
Genesee	Rufus Robertson	Anti-Jacksonian	
Genesee	Charles Woodworth	Anti-Jacksonian	
Greene	Henry Goslee	Jacksonian	
Greene	William Pierson	Jacksonian	
Hamilton and Montgomery	William Carlisle	Jacksonian	
Hamilton and Montgomery	Douw A. Fonda	Jacksonian	
Hamilton and Montgomery	Cornelius Mabee	Jacksonian	
Herkimer	Dudley Burwell	Jacksonian	
Herkimer	Joseph M. Prendergast	Jacksonian	
Herkimer	Sherman Wooster	Jacksonian	
Jefferson	William H. Angel*	Jacksonian	
Jefferson	John Burch	Jacksonian	
Jefferson	Jotham Ives	Jacksonian	
Kings	Coe S. Downing*	Jacksonian	
Lewis	Eli Rogers Jr.	Jacksonian	
Livingston	George W. Patterson*	Anti-Jacksonian	
Livingston	Samuel W. Smith	Anti-Jacksonian	
Madison	Erastus Cleaveland	Jacksonian	
Madison	John Davis	Jacksonian	
Madison	Jesse Kilborn	Jacksonian	
Monroe	Timothy Childs	Anti-Jacksonian	
Monroe	Levi Pond	Anti-Jacksonian	
Monroe	Milton Sheldon	Anti-Jacksonian	
New York	Richard Cromwell	Jacksonian	
New York	Thomas Herttell	Jacksonian	
New York	Charles L. Livingston*	Jacksonian	re-elected Speaker
New York	John McKeon*	Jacksonian	
New York	Robert H. Morris	Jacksonian	
New York	Mordecai Myers*	Jacksonian	
New York	Gideon Ostrander*	Jacksonian	
New York	Benjamin Ringgold	Jacksonian	
New York	Silas M. Stilwell*	Jacksonian	
New York	Minthorne Tompkins	Jacksonian	
New York	Isaac L. Varian*	Jacksonian	
Niagara	Henry Norton*	Anti-Jacksonian	
Oneida	Ichabod C. Baker	Jacksonian	
Oneida	Levi Buckingham	Jacksonian	
Oneida	John Dewey	Jacksonian	
Oneida	Squire Utley	Jacksonian	
Oneida	David Wager	Jacksonian	
Onondaga	Asa Eastwood	Jacksonian	
Onondaga	Elisha Litchfield*	Jacksonian	
Onondaga	Myron L. Mills	Jacksonian	
Onondaga	Gabriel Tappen	Jacksonian	
Ontario	Ephraim W. Cleveland	Anti-Jacksonian	
Ontario	John C. Spencer	Anti-Jacksonian	
Ontario	James H. Woods	Anti-Jacksonian	
Orange	James Finch Jr.	Jacksonian	
Orange	Ezra Keeler	Jacksonian	
Orange	Isaac R. Van Duzer*	Jacksonian	
Orleans	Asahel Byington	Anti-Jacksonian	
Oswego	Avery Skinner*	Jacksonian	
Otsego	William Baker	Jacksonian	
Otsego	Philo Bennet	Jacksonian	
Otsego	Hiram Kinne	Jacksonian	
Otsego	Robert C. Lansing	Jacksonian	
Putnam	John Garrison	Jacksonian	
Queens	Thomas B. Jackson	Jacksonian	
Rensselaer	Alonzo G. Hammond	Jacksonian	
Rensselaer	William P. Haskin	Jacksonian	
Rensselaer	John I. Kittle	Jacksonian	
Rensselaer	Seth Parsons	Jacksonian	
Richmond	Jacob Mersereau*	Jacksonian	
Rockland	James D. L. Montanya	Jacksonian	
St. Lawrence	William Allen*	Jacksonian	
St. Lawrence	Sylvester Butrick	Jacksonian	
Saratoga	Ebenezer Couch*	Jacksonian	
Saratoga	George Reynolds	Jacksonian	
Saratoga	Ephraim Stevens	Jacksonian	
Schenectady	Cornelius C. Van Vranken	Jacksonian	
Schoharie	Jacob L. Lawyer	Jacksonian	
Schoharie	Martines Mattice	Jacksonian	
Seneca	Reuben D. Dodge*	Jacksonian	
Seneca	John De Mott	Jacksonian	
Steuben	William Hunter	Jacksonian	
Steuben	William Kernan	Jacksonian	
Suffolk	David Hedges Jr.	Jacksonian	
Suffolk	William Wicks	Jacksonian	
Sullivan	James C. Curtis	Jacksonian	also Supervisor of Cochecton
Tioga	Thomas Farrington	Jacksonian	
Tioga	Jacob Westlake	Jacksonian	
Tompkins	Thomas Bishop	Jacksonian	
Tompkins	Daniel B. Swartwood	Jacksonian	
Tompkins	Ira Tillotson	Jacksonian	
Ulster	Gordon Craig	Jacksonian	
Ulster	Joseph Jansen	Jacksonian	
Warren	Nicholas Roosevelt Jr.	Jacksonian	
Washington	Walter Cornell	Anti-Jacksonian	
Washington	Charles Rogers	Anti-Jacksonian	
Washington	David Abel Russell	Anti-Jacksonian	
Wayne	James Humeston*	Jacksonian	
Wayne	Ambrose Salisbury*	Jacksonian	
Westchester	Joseph H. Anderson	Jacksonian	
Westchester	Horatio Lockwood	Jacksonian	
Westchester	Israel H. Watson*	Jacksonian	
Yates	Joshua Lee	Jacksonian	

=== Employees ===
- Clerk: Francis Seger
- Sergeant-at-Arms: Cornelius A. Waldron
- Doorkeeper: Alonzo Crosby
- Assistant Doorkeeper: James Courter

== Sources ==
- The New York Civil List compiled by Franklin Benjamin Hough (Weed, Parsons and Co., 1858) [pg. 109 and 441 for Senate districts; pg. 129 for senators; pg. 148f for Assembly districts; pg. 213f for assemblymen]
- The History of Political Parties in the State of New-York, from the Ratification of the Federal Constitution to 1840 by Jabez D. Hammond (4th ed., Vol. 2, Phinney & Co., Buffalo, 1850; pg. 424 to 435)
