= 1833 United States Senate special election in New York =

The 1833 United States Senate special election in New York was held on January 4, 1833, by the New York State Legislature to elect a U.S. senator (Class 3) to represent the State of New York in the United States Senate.

== Background ==
William L. Marcy had been elected in 1831 to this seat. In November 1832, Marcy was elected Governor, and upon taking office resigned his Senate seat on January 1, 1833.

At the State election in November 1832, a very large Jacksonian-Democratic majority was elected to the Assembly, and six of the eight State Senators elected were Jacksonian Democrats. The 56th New York State Legislature met from January 1 to April 30, 1833, at Albany. The party strength in the Assembly as shown by the election for Speaker was: 99 for Jacksonian Democrat Charles L. Livingston and 22 for Anti-Mason John C. Spencer.

== Candidates ==
New York State Comptroller Silas Wright, Jr., was the candidate of the Jacksonian Democrats.

== Result ==
Silas Wright, Jr., was the choice of both the Assembly and the Senate, and was declared elected.

1833 United States Senate special election result
Office	Candidate	Party	Senate (32 members)	Assembly (128 members)
U.S. Senator	Silas Wright, Jr.	Jacksonian	24	99
	John C. Spencer	Anti-Mason	3	8
	James Burt		1	2
	Gerrit Smith		1	1
	James Kent			4
	Albert Gallatin			3
	Gideon Hawley			3
	John Birdsall	Anti-Mason		1
	Myron Holley			1
	William Thompson			1
	Albert H. Tracy	Anti-Mason		1
	Samuel A. Foot			1

== Aftermath ==
Wright took his seat on January 14, 1833, was re-elected twice (in 1837 and 1843) and remained in office until November 1844 when he resigned after his election as Governor of New York.

Comptroller Wright's election to the U.S. Senate produced a shuffle in the State's administration: Secretary of State Azariah C. Flagg succeeded Wright as Comptroller; Adjutant General John Adams Dix succeeded Flagg as Secretary of State; and Levi Hubbell was appointed Adjutant General of the State Militia.

== Sources ==
- The New York Civil List compiled in 1858 (see: pg. 63 for U.S. Senators; pg. 129 for State Senators 1833; pg. 213f for Members of Assembly 1833)
- Members of the 22nd United States Congress
- History of Political Parties in the State of New-York, Vol. II by Jabez Delano Hammond (State election, 1832: pg. 424; Speaker election, 1833: pg. 430; U.S. Senate special election, 1833: pg. 431)
- Journal of the Senate (56th Session) (1833; pg. 75f)
- Journal of the Assembly (56th Session) (1833; pg. 93f)
