= 57th New York State Legislature =

New York state legislative session

←	56th	58th	→
- The Old State Capitol (1879)

Overview
- Legislative body: New York State Legislature
- Jurisdiction: New York, United States
- Term: January 1 – December 31, 1834

Senate
- Members: 32
- President: Lt. Gov. John Tracy (J)
- Party control: Jacksonian (25-7)

Assembly
- Members: 128
- Speaker: William Baker (J)
- Party control: Jacksonian

Sessions
- 1st: January 7 – May 6, 1834

The 57th New York State Legislature, consisting of the New York State Senate and the New York State Assembly, met from January 7 to May 6, 1834, during the second year of William L. Marcy's governorship, in Albany.

== Background ==
Under the provisions of the New York Constitution of 1821, 32 Senators were elected on general tickets in eight senatorial districts for four-year terms. They were divided into four classes, and every year eight Senate seats came up for election. Assemblymen were elected countywide on general tickets to a one-year term, the whole Assembly being renewed annually.

At the time of the state election in 1833, there were three political parties: the Jacksonian Democrats, the Anti-Masonic Party, and the National Republican Party. The latter two parties had formed an Anti-Jacksonian bloc at the previous election.

== Elections ==
The State election was held from November 4 to 6, 1833. State Senators Thomas Armstrong (7th D.) and Albert H. Tracy (8th D.) were re-elected. Leonard Maison (2nd D.), John C. Kemble (3rd D.), Isaac W. Bishop (4th D.), Ebenezer Mack (6th D.); and Assembly Speaker Charles L. Livingston (1st D.) and Assembly Clerk Francis Seger (5th D.) were also elected to the Senate. Tracy was an Anti-Jacksonian, the other seven were Jacksonians.

== Sessions ==
The Legislature met for the regular session at the Old State Capitol in Albany on January 7, 1834; and adjourned on May 6.

William Baker (J) was elected Speaker unopposed.

On February 7, the Legislature re-elected State Treasurer Abraham Keyser, Jr.

On January 15, Assemblyman Samuel S. Bowne introduced "An act to abolish capital punishment, and to provide for the punishment of certain crimes". On March 8, the Assembly rejected the bill, after much debate, with a vote of 49 to 37.

About the time of the New York City election in April 1834, the Anti-Jacksonians assumed the name of Whig Party, and the Jacksonians became the Democratic Party.

The Whig state convention nominated State Senator William H. Seward for governor, and Silas M. Stilwell for lieutenant governor.

The Democratic state convention met on September 10 at Herkimer and nominated Gov. Marcy and Lt. Gov. Tracy for re-election.

== State Senate ==
=== Districts ===
- The First District (4 seats) consisted of Kings, New York, Queens, Richmond and Suffolk counties.
- The Second District (4 seats) consisted of Delaware, Dutchess, Orange, Putnam, Rockland, Sullivan, Ulster and Westchester counties.
- The Third District (4 seats) consisted of Albany, Columbia, Greene, Rensselaer, Schenectady and Schoharie counties.
- The Fourth District (4 seats) consisted of Clinton, Essex, Franklin, Hamilton, Montgomery, St. Lawrence, Saratoga, Warren and Washington counties.
- The Fifth District (4 seats) consisted of Herkimer, Jefferson, Lewis, Madison, Oneida and Oswego counties.
- The Sixth District (4 seats) consisted of Broome, Chenango, Cortland, Otsego, Steuben, Tioga and Tompkins counties.
- The Seventh District (4 seats) consisted of Cayuga, Onondaga, Ontario, Seneca, Wayne and Yates counties.
- The Eighth District (4 seats) consisted of Allegany, Cattaraugus, Chautauqua, Erie, Genesee, Livingston, Monroe, Niagara and Orleans counties.
Note: There are now 62 counties in the State of New York. The counties which are not mentioned in this list had not yet been established, or sufficiently organized, the area being included in one or more of the abovementioned counties.

=== Members ===
The asterisk (*) denotes members of the previous Legislature who continued in office as members of this Legislature. Charles L. Livingston changed from the Assembly to the Senate.

District	Senators	Term left	Party	Notes
First	Jonathan S. Conklin*	1 year	Jacksonian	
First	Harman B. Cropsey*	2 years	Jacksonian	
First	Myndert Van Schaick*	3 years	Jacksonian	
First	Charles L. Livingston*	4 years	Jacksonian	
Second	David M. Westcott*	1 year	Jacksonian	
Second	Allan Macdonald*	2 years	Jacksonian	also Postmaster of White Plains
Second	John Sudam*	3 years	Jacksonian	
Second	Leonard Maison	4 years	Jacksonian	
Third	Herman I. Quackenboss*	1 year	Jacksonian	
Third	John W. Edmonds*	2 years	Jacksonian	
Third	Peter Gansevoort*	3 years	Jacksonian	
Third	John C. Kemble	4 years	Jacksonian	
Fourth	William I. Dodge*	1 year	Jacksonian	
Fourth	Josiah Fisk*	2 years	Jacksonian	
Fourth	Louis Hasbrouck*	3 years	Anti-Jacksonian	died on August 20, 1834
Fourth	Isaac W. Bishop	4 years	Jacksonian	
Fifth	Henry A. Foster*	1 year	Jacksonian	
Fifth	Robert Lansing*	2 years	Jacksonian	
Fifth	John G. Stower*	3 years	Jacksonian	
Fifth	Francis Seger	4 years	Jacksonian	
Sixth	Charles W. Lynde*	1 year	Anti-Jacksonian	
Sixth	John G. McDowell*	2 years	Jacksonian	also Postmaster of Chemung
Sixth	John F. Hubbard*	3 years	Jacksonian	
Sixth	Ebenezer Mack	4 years	Jacksonian	
Seventh	William H. Seward*	1 year	Anti-Jacksonian	
Seventh	Jehiel H. Halsey*	2 years	Jacksonian	
Seventh	Samuel L. Edwards*	3 years	Jacksonian	
Seventh	Thomas Armstrong*	4 years	Jacksonian	
Eighth	Trumbull Cary*	1 year	Anti-Jacksonian	
Eighth	(John Birdsall*)	2 years	Anti-Jacksonian	did not take his seat during this session, and resigned on June 5, 1834
Eighth	John Griffin*	3 years	Anti-Jacksonian	
Eighth	Albert H. Tracy*	4 years	Anti-Jacksonian	

=== Employees ===
- Clerk: John F. Bacon

== State Assembly ==
=== Districts ===
- Albany County (3 seats)
- Allegany County (1 seat)
- Broome County (1 seat)
- Cattaraugus County (1 seat)
- Cayuga County (4 seats)
- Chautauqua County (2 seats)
- Chenango County (3 seats)
- Clinton County (1 seat)
- Columbia County (3 seats)
- Cortland County (2 seats)
- Delaware County (2 seats)
- Dutchess County (4 seats)
- Erie County (2 seats)
- Essex County (1 seat)
- Franklin County (1 seat)
- Genesee County (3 seats)
- Greene County (2 seats)
- Hamilton and Montgomery counties (3 seats)
- Herkimer County (3 seats)
- Jefferson County (3 seats)
- Kings County (1 seat)
- Lewis County (1 seat)
- Livingston County (2 seats)
- Madison County (3 seats)
- Monroe County (3 seats)
- The City and County of New York (11 seats)
- Niagara County (1 seat)
- Oneida County (5 seats)
- Onondaga County (4 seats)
- Ontario County (3 seats)
- Orange County (3 seats)
- Orleans County (1 seat)
- Oswego County (1 seat)
- Otsego County (4 seats)
- Putnam County (1 seat)
- Queens County (1 seat)
- Rensselaer County (4 seats)
- Richmond County (1 seat)
- Rockland County (1 seat)
- St. Lawrence County (2 seats)
- Saratoga County (3 seats)
- Schenectady County (1 seat)
- Schoharie County (2 seats)
- Seneca County (2 seats)
- Steuben County (2 seats)
- Suffolk County (2 seats)
- Sullivan County (1 seat)
- Tioga County (2 seats)
- Tompkins County (3 seats)
- Ulster County (2 seats)
- Warren County (1 seat)
- Washington (3 seats)
- Wayne County (2 seats)
- Westchester County (3 seats)
- Yates County (1 seat)
Note: There are now 62 counties in the State of New York. The counties which are not mentioned in this list had not yet been established, or sufficiently organized, the area being included in one or more of the abovementioned counties.

=== Assemblymen ===
The asterisk (*) denotes members of the previous Legislature who continued as members of this Legislature.

The party affiliations follow the vote on State officers on February 7 and April 17.

District	Assemblymen	Party	Notes
Albany	Aaron Livingston	Jacksonian	
Albany	Barent P. Staats	Jacksonian	
Albany	Prentice Williams Jr.	Jacksonian	
Allegany	Lewis Wood	Jacksonian	
Broome	David C. Case	Jacksonian	
Cattaraugus	Chauncey J. Fox*	Anti-Jacksonian	
Cayuga	Dennis Arnold	Jacksonian	
Cayuga	Cornelius Cuykendall	Jacksonian	
Cayuga	Andrew Groom	Jacksonian	
Cayuga	Noyes Palmer	Jacksonian	
Chautauqua	James Hall	Jacksonian	
Chautauqua	Thomas A. Osborne	Jacksonian	
Chenango	Joseph P. Chamberlin	Jacksonian	
Chenango	Milo Hunt	Jacksonian	
Chenango	Wells Wait	Jacksonian	
Clinton	Miles Stevenson*	Jacksonian	
Columbia	Henry C. Barnes		
Columbia	John F. Collin		
Columbia	John Snyder		
Cortland	Stephen Bogardus	Jacksonian	
Cortland	Oliver Kingman	Jacksonian	
Delaware	Samuel Gordon	Jacksonian	also Postmaster of Delhi
Delaware	Amasa J. Parker	Jacksonian	
Dutchess	Theodore V. W. Anthony	Jacksonian	
Dutchess	William H. Bostwick	Jacksonian	
Dutchess	Henry Conklin*	Jacksonian	
Dutchess	James Mabbett	Jacksonian	
Erie	Joseph Clary	Jacksonian	
Erie	Carlos Emmons	Anti-Jacksonian	
Essex	Barnabas Myrick	Jacksonian	
Franklin	Jabez Parkhurst*	Anti-Jacksonian	
Genesee	Truman Lewis	Anti-Jacksonian	
Genesee	Peter Patterson*	Anti-Jacksonian	
Genesee	Rufus Robertson*	Anti-Jacksonian	
Greene	Benedict Bagley		
Greene	Sylvester Nichols	Jacksonian	
Hamilton and Montgomery	Clark S. Grinnell	Jacksonian	
Hamilton and Montgomery	Azel Hough	Jacksonian	
Hamilton and Montgomery	Daniel Morrell	Jacksonian	
Herkimer	Augustus Beardslee	Jacksonian	
Herkimer	Timothy L. Campbell	Jacksonian	
Herkimer	Charles Dyer	Jacksonian	
Jefferson	William H. Angel*	Jacksonian	
Jefferson	Calvin McKnight	Jacksonian	
Jefferson	Eli West	Jacksonian	
Kings	Philip Brasher	Jacksonian	
Lewis	George D. Ruggles	Jacksonian	
Livingston	Salmon G. Grover		
Livingston	Tabor Ward	Jacksonian	
Madison	Sardis Dana	Jacksonian	
Madison	Benjamin Enos	Jacksonian	
Madison	Henry T. Sumner	Jacksonian	
Monroe	Elihu Church	Jacksonian	
Monroe	Fletcher Mathews Haight	Jacksonian	
Monroe	Jeremy S. Stone	Jacksonian	
New York	Abraham Cargill	Jacksonian	
New York	John W. Degrauw	Jacksonian	
New York	Daniel Dusenbury	Jacksonian	
New York	Thomas Herttell*	Jacksonian	
New York	Henry Hone	Jacksonian	
New York	John McKeon*	Jacksonian	
New York	Robert H. Morris*	Jacksonian	
New York	Mordecai Myers*	Jacksonian	
New York	Benjamin Ringgold*	Jacksonian	
New York	Peter S. Titus	Jacksonian	
New York	Minthorne Tompkins*	Jacksonian	
Niagara	Robert Fleming	Anti-Jacksonian	
Oneida	Pomeroy Jones	Jacksonian	
Oneida	Israel S. Parker	Jacksonian	
Oneida	Hiram Shays	Jacksonian	
Oneida	Aaron Stafford	Jacksonian	
Oneida	Ithai Thompson	Jacksonian	
Onondaga	Squire M. Brown	Jacksonian	
Onondaga	Jared H. Parker	Jacksonian	
Onondaga	Oliver R. Strong	Jacksonian	
Onondaga	Horace Wheaton	Jacksonian	
Ontario	Peter Mitchell	Jacksonian	
Ontario	Oliver Phelps	Jacksonian	
Ontario	Aaron Younglove	Jacksonian	
Orange	Merit H. Cash	Jacksonian	
Orange	Gilbert O. Fowler	Jacksonian	
Orange	Charles Winfield	Jacksonian	
Orleans	Asa Clark Jr.	Jacksonian	
Oswego	Orville Robinson	Jacksonian	also Surrogate of Oswego Co.
Otsego	William Baker*	Jacksonian	elected Speaker
Otsego	Samuel S. Bowne	Jacksonian	
Otsego	Ransom Spafard	Jacksonian	
Otsego	William Temple		
Putnam	Jonathan Morehouse	Jacksonian	
Queens	Thomas B. Jackson*	Jacksonian	
Rensselaer	Archibald Bull	Jacksonian	
Rensselaer	Smith Germond	Jacksonian	
Rensselaer	Nicholas B. Harris	Anti-Jacksonian	
Rensselaer	James Yates	Jacksonian	
Richmond	Paul Mersereau	Jacksonian	
Rockland	Daniel Johnson	Jacksonian	
St. Lawrence	Sylvester Butrick*	Jacksonian	
St. Lawrence	Jabez Willes	Jacksonian	
Saratoga	Solomon Ellithorp	Jacksonian	
Saratoga	Thomas J. Marvin	Jacksonian	
Saratoga	Eli M. Todd	Jacksonian	
Schenectady	Simeon Schermerhorn	Jacksonian	
Schoharie	Watson Orr	Jacksonian	
Schoharie	John G. Young	Jacksonian	
Seneca	Peter Bockoven	Jacksonian	
Seneca	John D. Coe	Jacksonian	
Steuben	Joshua Healy	Jacksonian	
Steuben	William Kernan*	Jacksonian	
Suffolk	William Sidney Smith	Jacksonian	
Suffolk	John Terry	Jacksonian	
Sullivan	Anthony Hasbrouck	Jacksonian	
Tioga	John R. Drake	Jacksonian	also First Judge of the Tioga Co. Court
Tioga	George Gardner	Jacksonian	
Tompkins	George B. Guinnip	Jacksonian	
Tompkins	Charles Humphrey	Anti-Jacksonian	
Tompkins	Thomas B. Sears		
Ulster	Samuel Culver	Jacksonian	
Ulster	Daniel Le Fever	Jacksonian	
Warren	Thomas Archibald	Jacksonian	
Washington	Charles F. Ingalls	Jacksonian	
Washington	Melancton Wheeler	Jacksonian	
Washington	James Wright	Jacksonian	
Wayne	James P. Bartle	Jacksonian	
Wayne	Russell Whipple	Jacksonian	
Westchester	Joseph H. Anderson*	Jacksonian	
Westchester	Edwin Crosby	Jacksonian	
Westchester	Horatio Lockwood*	Jacksonian	
Yates	James P. Robinson	Jacksonian	

=== Employees ===
- Clerk: Philip Reynolds Jr.
- Sergeant-at-Arms: Daniel Dygert
- Doorkeeper: Alonzo Crosby
- Assistant Doorkeeper: Samuel Campbell

== Sources ==
- The New York Civil List compiled by Franklin Benjamin Hough (Weed, Parsons and Co., 1858) [pg. 109 and 441 for Senate districts; pg. 130 for senators; pg. 148f for Assembly districts; pg. 214ff for assemblymen]
- The History of Political Parties in the State of New-York, from the Ratification of the Federal Constitution to 1840 by Jabez D. Hammond (4th ed., Vol. 2, Phinney & Co., Buffalo, 1850; pg. 435 to 442)
