= Isaac W. Bishop =

American politician

Isaac W. Bishop (born c. 1804) was an American lawyer and politician from New York.

== Life ==
He was admitted to the bar in 1829. He was a member of the New York State Assembly (Washington Co.) in 1832.

He was a member of the New York State Senate (4th D.) from 1834 to 1836, sitting in the 57th, 58th and 59th New York State Legislatures. In 1836, he and State Senator John C. Kemble were accused of corrupt and fraudulent stock trading. Kemble resigned his seat on May 20. State Senator Samuel Young moved to expel Bishop, but on May 21 a majority of the Senate voted against it. On May 23, Young and State Senator Myndert Van Schaick resigned their seats stating they would not sit together with persons who found Bishop "guilty of moral and official misconduct," and then refused to expel him. About half an hour later, Bishop resigned his seat too.

He was Supervisor of Granville in 1842 and 1843.

He was a presidential elector in 1852, voting for Franklin Pierce and William R. King.

In 1853, he became Vice President of the Bank of Salem.

In 1859, he was Postmaster of Granville.

An 1884 newspaper article noted the friendship between Bishop and former New York Governor William H. Seward, stating that when Seward was governor, "he was on a certain occasion the guest of the late Hon. Isaac W. Bishop of Granville, between whom and Gov. Seward there was strong personal friendship, not withstanding their political differences".

== Sources ==
- The New York Civil List compiled by Franklin Benjamin Hough (pages 130f, 138, 213, 259, 323 and 331; Weed, Parsons and Co., 1858)
- The Lives and Opinions of Benjamin Franklin Butler and Jesse Hoyt by William Lyon Mackenzie (Cook & Co., Boston, 1845; Ch. XXX: "Bishop and Kemble's Stock Jobbing", pg. 124ff)
- The New York State Register (1831; pg. 218)
- List of Post Offices in the United States (1859; pg. 63)

New York State Senate
Preceded by Isaac Gere	New York State Senate; Fourth District (Class 3); 1834–1836	Succeeded by John McLean Jr.
