= Senator Lansing =

Senator Lansing may refer to:

- Abraham Lansing (1835–1899), New York State Senate
- Frederick Lansing (1838–1894), New York State Senate
- Robert Lansing (state senator) (1799–1878), New York State Senate
