= Senator Fisk (disambiguation) =

James Fisk (politician) (1763–1844) was a U.S. Senator from Vermont from 1817 to 1818. Senator Fisk may also refer to:

- Josiah Fisk (1781–1844), New York State Senate
- Nelson W. Fisk (1854–1923), Vermont State Senate
