= 55th New York State Legislature =

New York state legislative session

←	54th	56th	→
- The Old State Capitol (1879)

Overview
- Legislative body: New York State Legislature
- Jurisdiction: New York, United States
- Term: January 1 – December 31, 1832

Senate
- Members: 32
- President: Lt. Gov. Edward P. Livingston (J)
- Party control: Jacksonian (24-8)

Assembly
- Members: 128
- Speaker: Charles L. Livingston (J)
- Party control: Jacksonian

Sessions
- 1st: January 3 – April 26, 1832
- 1st: June 21 – July 2, 1832

The 55th New York State Legislature, consisting of the New York State Senate and the New York State Assembly, met from January 3 to July 2, 1832, during the fourth year of Enos T. Throop's governorship, in Albany.

== Background ==
Under the provisions of the New York Constitution of 1821, 32 Senators were elected on general tickets in eight senatorial districts for four-year terms. They were divided into four classes, and every year eight Senate seats came up for election. Assemblymen were elected countywide on general tickets to a one-year term, the whole Assembly being renewed annually.

Canal Commissioner Henry Seymour (J) resigned in May 1831. Gov. Throop appointed Jonas Earll, Jr. (J) to fill the vacancy temporarily.

At this time, there were three political parties: the Jacksonian Democrats (supporting President Andrew Jackson; led by Martin Van Buren), the Anti-Masons, and the National Republicans (supporting Henry Clay for the presidency).

== Elections ==
The State election was held from November 7 to 9, 1831. Harman B. Cropsey (1st D.), Allan Macdonald (2nd D.), Josiah Fisk (4th D.), Robert Lansing (5th D.), Jehiel H. Halsey (7th D.); and Assemblymen John W. Edmonds (3rd D.), John G. McDowell (6th D.) and John Birdsall (8th D.) were elected to the Senate. Birdsall was an Anti-Mason, the other seven were Jacksonians.

== Sessions ==
The Legislature met for the regular session at the Old State Capitol in Albany on January 3, 1832; and adjourned on April 26.

Charles L. Livingston (J) was elected Speaker.

On January 9, the Legislature upheld Gov. Throop's recess appointment, electing Jonas Earll, Jr. as Canal Commissioner.

On February 6, the Legislature re-elected Secretary of State Azariah C. Flagg, State Comptroller Silas Wright, Jr., State Treasurer Abraham Keyser, Jr., Attorney General Greene C. Bronson and Surveyor General Simeon De Witt.

The Anti-Masonic state convention met on June 21, and nominated again Assemblyman Francis Granger for Governor and Samuel Stevens, of New York City, for Lieutenant Governor. They also nominated a full ticket of presidential electors, apparently composed of some supporters of William Wirt, and some of Henry Clay, but not pledged to any candidate.

The Legislature met for a special session on June 21; and the Assembly adjourned on June 30, the Senate on July 2. This session was called to re-apportion the congressional districts, and to direct sanitary measures concerning the cholera epidemic.

The National Republican state convention met on July 26, Ambrose Spencer was Chairman. They endorsed The Anti-Masonic nominees Granger and Stevens. They also endorsed the ticket of presidential electors nominated by the Anti-Masons, who—if they won the election—should vote for Henry Clay if this would help to defeat Jackson, otherwise for Wirt. In effect, both parties were in the process of merging, becoming eventually the Whig Party.

The Jacksonian state convention met on September 19 at Herkimer, Samuel Young was Chairman. They nominated U.S. Senator William L. Marcy for Governor, and Judge John Tracy for Lieutenant Governor.

== State Senate ==
=== Districts ===
- The First District (4 seats) consisted of Kings, New York, Queens, Richmond and Suffolk counties.
- The Second District (4 seats) consisted of Delaware, Dutchess, Orange, Putnam, Rockland, Sullivan, Ulster and Westchester counties.
- The Third District (4 seats) consisted of Albany, Columbia, Greene, Rensselaer, Schenectady and Schoharie counties.
- The Fourth District (4 seats) consisted of Clinton, Essex, Franklin, Hamilton, Montgomery, St. Lawrence, Saratoga, Warren and Washington counties.
- The Fifth District (4 seats) consisted of Herkimer, Jefferson, Lewis, Madison, Oneida and Oswego counties.
- The Sixth District (4 seats) consisted of Broome, Chenango, Cortland, Otsego, Steuben, Tioga and Tompkins counties.
- The Seventh District (4 seats) consisted of Cayuga, Onondaga, Ontario, Seneca, Wayne and Yates counties.
- The Eighth District (4 seats) consisted of Allegany, Cattaraugus, Chautauqua, Erie, Genesee, Livingston, Monroe, Niagara and Orleans counties.
Note: There are now 62 counties in the State of New York. The counties which are not mentioned in this list had not yet been established, or sufficiently organized, the area being included in one or more of the abovementioned counties.

=== Members ===
The asterisk (*) denotes members of the previous Legislature who continued in office as members of this Legislature. John W. Edmonds, John G. McDowell and John Birdsall changed from the Assembly to the Senate.

District	Senators	Term left	Party	Notes
First	Stephen Allen*	1 year	Jacksonian	
First	Alpheus Sherman*	2 years	Jacksonian	
First	Jonathan S. Conklin*	3 years	Jacksonian	
First	Harman B. Cropsey	4 years	Jacksonian	
Second	Samuel Rexford*	1 year	Jacksonian	
Second	Nathaniel P. Tallmadge*	2 years	Jacksonian	
Second	David M. Westcott*	3 years	Jacksonian	
Second	Allan Macdonald	4 years	Jacksonian	also Postmaster of White Plains
Third	Lewis Eaton*	1 year	Jacksonian	
Third	William Dietz*	2 years	Jacksonian	in November 1832, elected a presidential elector
Third	Herman I. Quackenboss*	3 years	Jacksonian	
Third	John W. Edmonds*	4 years	Jacksonian	also Recorder of the City of Hudson
Fourth	John McLean Jr.*	1 year	Jacksonian	
Fourth	Isaac Gere*	2 years	Jacksonian	
Fourth	William I. Dodge*	3 years	Jacksonian	
Fourth	Josiah Fisk	4 years	Jacksonian	
Fifth	William H. Maynard*	1 year	Anti-Mason	died on August 28, 1832
Fifth	Alvin Bronson*	2 years	Jacksonian	
Fifth	Henry A. Foster*	3 years	Jacksonian	
Fifth	Robert Lansing	4 years	Jacksonian	
Sixth	John F. Hubbard*	1 year	Jacksonian	
Sixth	Levi Beardsley*	2 years	Jacksonian	
Sixth	Charles W. Lynde*	3 years	Anti-Mason	
Sixth	John G. McDowell*	4 years	Jacksonian	also Postmaster of Chemung
Seventh	Hiram F. Mather*	1 year	Anti-Mason	
Seventh	Thomas Armstrong*	2 years	Jacksonian	also Supervisor of Butler
Seventh	William H. Seward*	3 years	Anti-Mason	
Seventh	Jehiel H. Halsey	4 years	Jacksonian	
Eighth	Philo C. Fuller*	1 year	Anti-Mason	
Eighth	Albert H. Tracy*	2 years	Anti-Mason	
Eighth	Trumbull Cary*	3 years	Anti-Mason	
Eighth	John Birdsall*	4 years	Anti-Mason	

=== Employees ===
- Clerk: John F. Bacon

== State Assembly ==
=== Districts ===
- Albany County (3 seats)
- Allegany County (1 seat)
- Broome County (1 seat)
- Cattaraugus County (1 seat)
- Cayuga County (4 seats)
- Chautauqua County (2 seats)
- Chenango County (3 seats)
- Clinton County (1 seat)
- Columbia County (3 seats)
- Cortland County (2 seats)
- Delaware County (2 seats)
- Dutchess County (4 seats)
- Erie County (2 seats)
- Essex County (1 seat)
- Franklin County (1 seat)
- Genesee County (3 seats)
- Greene County (2 seats)
- Hamilton and Montgomery counties (3 seats)
- Herkimer County (3 seats)
- Jefferson County (3 seats)
- Kings County (1 seat)
- Lewis County (1 seat)
- Livingston County (2 seats)
- Madison County (3 seats)
- Monroe County (3 seats)
- The City and County of New York (11 seats)
- Niagara County (1 seat)
- Oneida County (5 seats)
- Onondaga County (4 seats)
- Ontario County (3 seats)
- Orange County (3 seats)
- Orleans County (1 seat)
- Oswego County (1 seat)
- Otsego County (4 seats)
- Putnam County (1 seat)
- Queens County (1 seat)
- Rensselaer County (4 seats)
- Richmond County (1 seat)
- Rockland County (1 seat)
- St. Lawrence County (2 seats)
- Saratoga County (3 seats)
- Schenectady County (1 seat)
- Schoharie County (2 seats)
- Seneca County (2 seats)
- Steuben County (2 seats)
- Suffolk County (2 seats)
- Sullivan County (1 seat)
- Tioga County (2 seats)
- Tompkins County (3 seats)
- Ulster County (2 seats)
- Warren County (1 seat)
- Washington (3 seats)
- Wayne County (2 seats)
- Westchester County (3 seats)
- Yates County (1 seat)
Note: There are now 62 counties in the State of New York. The counties which are not mentioned in this list had not yet been established, or sufficiently organized, the area being included in one or more of the abovementioned counties.

=== Assemblymen ===
The asterisk (*) denotes members of the previous Legislature who continued as members of this Legislature.

The party affiliations follow the vote on the state officers on January 9 and February 6; and participation in the Jacksonian caucus on February 2.

District	Assemblymen	Party	Notes
Albany	Abijah C. Disbrow	Jacksonian	
Albany	Philip Lennebacker	Jacksonian	
Albany	William Seymour	Jacksonian	
Allegany	John B. Collins	Anti-Mason	
Broome	Vincent Whitney	Anti-Mason	
Cattaraugus	George A. S. Crooker	Nat. Rep.	
Cayuga	John Beardsley	Jacksonian	
Cayuga	George H. Brinkerhoff	Jacksonian	
Cayuga	John W. Sawyer	Jacksonian	
Cayuga	George S. Tilford*	Jacksonian	
Chautauqua	Theron Bly	Anti-Mason	
Chautauqua	Squire White*	Anti-Mason	
Chenango	Noah Ely	Anti-Mason	
Chenango	Joseph Juliand*	Anti-Mason	
Chenango	Edmond G. Per Lee	Anti-Mason	
Clinton	John Walker*	Jacksonian	died on January 13 or 14, 1832.
Clinton	John Palmer	Jacksonian	elected to fill vacancy, seated on February 24, 1832
Columbia	Medad Butler	Jacksonian	
Columbia	Tobias L. Hogeboom	Jacksonian	
Columbia	Leonard W. Ten Broeck	Jacksonian	
Cortland	Andrew Dickson	Jacksonian	
Cortland	Jonathan L. Woods	Jacksonian	
Delaware	James Coulter	Jacksonian	
Delaware	James Hughston	Jacksonian	
Dutchess	Robert Coffin	Jacksonian	
Dutchess	Ely Hamblin	Jacksonian	
Dutchess	Michael S. Martin	Jacksonian	
Dutchess	Israel Shadbolt	Jacksonian	
Erie	Horace Clark	Anti-Mason	
Erie	William Mills	Anti-Mason	
Essex	Isaac Vanderwarker	Jacksonian	
Franklin	James B. Spencer*	Jacksonian	
Genesee	Seth M. Gates	Anti-Mason	
Genesee	Henry Hawkins	Anti-Mason	
Genesee	James Sprague 2d	Anti-Mason	
Greene	Erastus Hamilton	Jacksonian	
Greene	Dumah Tuttle	Jacksonian	
Hamilton and Montgomery	Silas Philips	Jacksonian	
Hamilton and Montgomery	Jacob Van Arnum	Jacksonian	
Hamilton and Montgomery	Peter Wood	Jacksonian	
Herkimer	William C. Crain	Jacksonian	
Herkimer	Daniel Dygert	Jacksonian	
Herkimer	David Thorp	Jacksonian	
Jefferson	William H. Angel	Jacksonian	
Jefferson	Philip Maxwell	Jacksonian	
Jefferson	Nathan Strong	Jacksonian	
Kings	Coe S. Downing*	Jacksonian	
Lewis	Andrew W. Doig	Jacksonian	
Livingston	George W. Patterson	Anti-Mason	
Livingston	John Young	Anti-Mason	
Madison	Nehemiah Batcheler	Anti-Mason	
Madison	Daniel M. Gillet	Anti-Mason	
Madison	John Head 2d	Anti-Mason	
Monroe	Samuel G. Andrews*	Anti-Mason	
Monroe	Ira Bellows	Anti-Mason	
Monroe	William B. Brown	Anti-Mason	
New York	Nathan T. Arnold	Jacksonian	
New York	Judah Hammond	Jacksonian	
New York	Charles L. Livingston*	Jacksonian	elected Speaker
New York	John McKeon	Jacksonian	
New York	Philip E. Milledoler	Jacksonian	
New York	James Morgan*	Jacksonian	
New York	Mordecai Myers*	Jacksonian	
New York	Gideon Ostrander*	Jacksonian	
New York	Silas M. Stilwell*	Jacksonian	
New York	Myndert Van Schaick	Jacksonian	
New York	Isaac L. Varian*	Jacksonian	
Niagara	Henry Norton*	Anti-Mason	
Oneida	Nathaniel Fitch	Jacksonian	
Oneida	Lemuel Hough	Jacksonian	
Oneida	Rutger B. Miller	Jacksonian	
Oneida	David Moulton*	Jacksonian	in November 1832, elected a presidential elector
Oneida	Daniel Twitchell	Jacksonian	
Onondaga	Miles W. Bennett	Jacksonian	
Onondaga	Elijah W. Curtis	Jacksonian	
Onondaga	Elisha Litchfield*	Jacksonian	
Onondaga	Ichabod Ross	Jacksonian	
Ontario	Francis Granger	Anti-Mason	
Ontario	Jonathan Mason	Anti-Mason	
Ontario	Robert C. Nicholas	Anti-Mason	
Orange	John Barker	Jacksonian	
Orange	Isaac R. Van Duzer	Jacksonian	
Orange	Charles Winfield	Jacksonian	
Orleans	William J. Babbitt	Anti-Mason	
Oswego	Avery Skinner	Jacksonian	
Otsego	Samuel Colwell	Jacksonian	
Otsego	Gilbert Cone	Jacksonian	
Otsego	William Kirby	Jacksonian	
Otsego	Amasa Thompson	Jacksonian	
Putnam	Reuben D. Barnum	Jacksonian	
Queens	John A. King	Nat. Rep.	
Rensselaer	Hosea Bennett	Jacksonian	
Rensselaer	Henry J. Genet	Jacksonian	
Rensselaer	John C. Kemble	Jacksonian	
Rensselaer	Nicholas M. Masters	Jacksonian	
Richmond	Jacob Mersereau	Jacksonian	
Rockland	Isaac I. Blauvelt	Jacksonian	
St. Lawrence	William Allen	Jacksonian	
St. Lawrence	Edwin Dodge	Jacksonian	
Saratoga	James Brisbin Jr.	Jacksonian	
Saratoga	Ebenezer Couch	Jacksonian	
Saratoga	Oran G. Otis*	Jacksonian	
Schenectady	Abraham Dorn	Jacksonian	
Schoharie	Alexander Crookshank	Jacksonian	
Schoharie	Jedediah Miller	Nat. Rep.	
Seneca	Reuben D. Dodge	Jacksonian	
Seneca	Erastus Woodworth	Jacksonian	
Steuben	Edward Howell	Jacksonian	also D.A. of Steuben County; in November 1832, elected to the 23rd U.S. Congress
Steuben	John McBurney	Jacksonian	
Suffolk	Samuel L'Hommedieu Jr.	Jacksonian	
Suffolk	John M. Williamson	Jacksonian	
Sullivan	Hiram Bennett	Nat. Rep.	
Tioga	Nathaniel Smith	Jacksonian	
Tioga	Joel Tallmadge Jr.	Jacksonian	
Tompkins	John Ellis*	Anti-Mason	
Tompkins	Horace Mack	Jacksonian	
Tompkins	John James Speed Jr.	Jacksonian	
Ulster	Leonard Hardenbergh	Jacksonian	
Ulster	Heman Landon	Jacksonian	
Warren	Allen Anderson	Jacksonian	
Washington	Isaac W. Bishop	Jacksonian	
Washington	John McDonald	Nat. Rep.	
Washington	James Stevenson	Nat. Rep.	
Wayne	James Humeston	Jacksonian	
Wayne	Ambrose Salisbury	Jacksonian	
Westchester	John W. Frost	Nat. Rep.	
Westchester	Thomas Smith	Nat. Rep.	
Westchester	Israel H. Watson	Jacksonian	
Yates	Aaron Remer*	Jacksonian	

=== Employees ===
- Clerk: Francis Seger
- Sergeant-at-Arms: James D. Scollard
- Doorkeeper: Alonzo Crosby
- Assistant Doorkeeper: James Courter (1st session)
  - Oliver Scovil (2nd session)

== Sources ==
- The New York Civil List compiled by Franklin Benjamin Hough (Weed, Parsons and Co., 1858) [pg. 109 and 441 for Senate districts; pg. 129 for senators; pg. 148f for Assembly districts; pg. 212f for assemblymen]
- The History of Political Parties in the State of New-York, from the Ratification of the Federal Constitution to 1840 by Jabez D. Hammond (4th ed., Vol. 2, Phinney & Co., Buffalo, 1850; pg. 368 to 424)
