= Senator Davenport =

Senator Davenport may refer to:

- Ashley Davenport (1794–1874), New York State Senate
- Frank Davenport (1912–1995), New Jersey State Senate
- Franklin Davenport (1755–1832), New Jersey State Senate
- Frederick M. Davenport (1866–1956), New York State Senate
- Gail Davenport (born 1949), Georgia State Senate
- Ira Davenport (politician) (1841–1904), New York State Senate
- Jewett H. Davenport (1828–1892), Texas State Senate
- John Davenport (Ohio politician) (1788–1855), Ohio State Senate
- Stephen Davenport (1924–2011), Massachusetts State Senate
- William N. Davenport (1856–1933), Massachusetts State Senate
