= Senator Harsbrouck =

Senator Harsbrouck may refer to:

- Abraham J. Hasbrouck (1773–1845), New York State Senate
- Louis Hasbrouck (1777–1834), New York State Senate
