= Senator Dodge =

Senator Dodge may refer to:

== Members of the United States Senate ==
- Augustus C. Dodge (1812–1883), U.S. Senator from Iowa from 1848 to 1855
- Henry Dodge (1782–1867), U.S. Senator from Wisconsin from 1848 to 1857

== United States state senate members ==
- William C. Dodge (1880–1973), New York State Senate
- William I. Dodge (1780s–1873), New York State Senate
