= Goose Van Schaick =

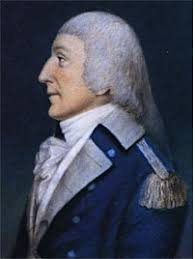
- Born: September 5, 1736; Albany, New York
- Died: July 4, 1789 (aged 53); Albany, New York
- Occupation: Military officer
- Spouse: Maria Ten Broeck (m. 1770)
- Children: 7, including Myndert
- Military career
- Allegiance: New York (1758–1762); United States (1775–1783)
- Branch: New York Provincial Forces (1758–1762); Continental Army (1775–1783)
- Rank: Colonel
- Conflicts: French and Indian War; Battle of Fort Frontenac; Battle of Fort Niagara; American Revolutionary War; Siege of Fort Ticonderoga; Battle of Monmouth
- Parent(s): Sybrant Van Schaick and Alida Rosebloom

Colonel Goose Van Schaick (September 5, 1736 – July 4, 1789) was a Continental Army officer who served during the American Revolutionary War.

== Early life ==
Van Schaick was born in Albany on September 5, 1736. He was the first child born to Sybrant Van Schaick, who served as Mayor of Albany, New York from 1756 to 1761, and Alida (née Rosebloom) Van Schaick.

His paternal grandparents were Albany trader and landholder Gosen Van Schaick and Catharina (née Staats) Van Schaick. Goose's cousin Catherine (née Van Schaick) Gansevoort and her husband Peter Gansevoort, the Sheriff of Albany County, were the grandparents of author Herman Melville.

== Career ==
In 1758, he was a captain in the New York Provincial Forces and participated in the Battle of Fort Frontenac and the Battle of Fort Niagara during the French and Indian War. From 1760 to 1762, he served as a lieutenant colonel in the Second New York Regiment and subsequently the First New York Regiment.

On June 28, 1775 he was commissioned as colonel of the 2nd New York Regiment of the Continental Army. On March 8, 1776 he was made colonel of the 1st New York Regiment. On July 6, 1777, he was wounded at the Siege of Fort Ticonderoga. He served under Gen. William Alexander at the Battle of Monmouth.

In April 1779, Van Schaick, at the head of a 558-strong force of American troops, set out from Fort Stanwix on an expedition against the British-allied Onondaga people, who had been attacking American settlements and military personnel. Van Schaick's troops attacked and captured the settlement of Onondaga together with large quantities of provisions, stores and cattle; they also took 34 people prisoner. Without losing a single man, they killed 12 Native Americans.

Despite Van Schaick's superior James Clinton ordering him to prevent his soldiers from assaulting any Onondaga women (noting that "Bad as the savages are, they never violate the chastity of any women"), the Americans committed numerous atrocities during the expedition. American soldiers "killed babies and raped women", and an Onondaga chief recounted to the British in 1782 how the Americans "put to death all the Women and Children, excepting some of the Young Women, whom they carried away for the use of their Soldiers & were afterwards put to death in a more shameful manner".

Afterwards, George Washington praised Van Schaick's conduct during the expedition which he claimed had brought "the highest honor" to him and his men. On May 10, 1779, an act of the Continental Congress stated that "Resolved, that the thanks of Congress be presented to Colonel Van Schaick and the officers and soldiers under his command, for their activity and good conduct in the late expedition against the Onondagas". At the time, the expedition was considered to be more effectual than the subsequent Sullivan Expedition.

He was appointed brevet brigadier general on October 10, 1783, and he served until November 1783.

== Personal life ==
On November 15, 1770, Van Schaick was married to Maria Ten Broeck (1750–1829), the eldest of ten daughters born to John Tobias Ten Broeck. By 1787, they were the parents of seven children, including:

- Alida Van Schaick (b. 1771)
- John Van Schaick (b. 1774)
- Sybrant Van Schaick (b. 1776)
- Tobias Van Schaick (b. 1779), who married Jane Staats (1783–1823), daughter of merchant Henry Staats in 1811.
- Myndert Van Schaick (1782–1865), who was a New York State Senator.
- Elizabeth Van Schaick (1786–1786), who died young.
- Abraham Van Schaick (b. 1787).

He died at his home on July 4, 1789, of cancer of his facial wound received in the battle of Fort Ticonderoga of 1777. The site of his burial is unclear. It appears he was buried in the family cemetery on Court St. in Albany until 1808, when he was reinterred in the Reformed Dutch Burial Grounds. Graves from the Dutch Cemetery were later reinterred in the Church Section of the Albany Rural Cemetery.
