= Morris Franklin =

American politician

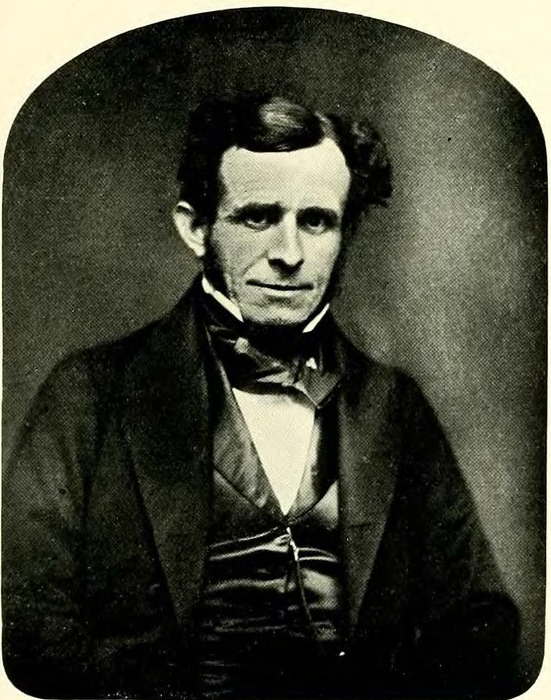

Member of the New York State Senate First District (Class 1)
- In office 1842–1843
- Preceded by: Minthorne Tompkins
- Succeeded by: David R. Floyd-Jones

Personal details
- Born: October 20, 1801 New York City
- Died: October 22, 1885 (aged 84) Flushing, Queens

Morris Franklin (October 20, 1801 – October 22, 1885) was an American lawyer, businessman and politician from New York.

== Early life ==
He was born on October 20, 1801, in New York City. He was the son of Mary (née Haviland) Franklin (1773–1854) and Thomas "Uncle Tommy" Franklin Jr. (1762–1830), a merchant and chief engineer of the Volunteer Fire Department from 1799 to 1812. He studied law and was admitted to the bar.

== Career ==
He was a member of the New York State Assembly (New York Co.) in 1837 and a member of the New York State Senate (1st D.) in 1842 and 1843.

In 1844, Franklin was the Whig candidate for Mayor of New York City, but was defeated by James Harper who ran as the candidate of the American Republican Party.

Franklin was President of the Board of Aldermen of New York City from 1847 to 1849.

He was President of the New York Life Insurance Company from 1848 until after 1870.

== Personal life ==
In 1837, Franklin married Ann Eliza Franklin (1814–1894). Together, they were the parents of:

- Lindley Murray Franklin (1838–1913), a banker.
- Edward Morris Franklin (1853–1928)
- Lindsay Murray Franklin (d. 1913)

He died on October 22, 1885, in Flushing, Queens.

== Sources ==
New York State Senate
| Preceded by Minthorne Tompkins | New York State Senate; First District (Class 1); 1842–1843 | Succeeded by David R. Floyd-Jones |
