= Horace Clark (assemblyman) =

American politician

Horace Clark was an American politician from New York.

== Life ==
He was an Anti-Masonic member of the New York State Assembly (Erie Co.) in 1832 and 1833.

== Sources ==
  - The New York Civil List compiled by Franklin Benjamin Hough (pages 212f and 265; Weed, Parsons and Co., 1858)
