= Jabez Willes =

American politician

Jabez Willes (December 6, 1790 – March 24, 1842 in Potsdam, St. Lawrence County, New York) was an American manufacturer and politician from New York.

== Life ==
He was the son of Sylvanus Willes (1756–1841) and Eunice (Davidson) Willes (1757–1849). He married Betsey Tupper (1795–1885), and they had eight children. In 1819, the family removed to Potsdam NY, and the next year Jabez Willes established an iron foundry there. He was an associate judge of the St. Lawrence County Court.

He was a member of the New York State Assembly (St. Lawrence Co.) in 1828 and 1834.

He was a member of the New York State Senate (4th D.) from 1835 to 1838, sitting in the 58th, 59th, 60th and 61st New York State Legislatures.

He was buried at the Bayside Cemetery in Potsdam NY.

== Sources ==
- The New York Civil List compiled by Franklin Benjamin Hough (pages 130f, 147, 207, 215 and 316; Weed, Parsons and Co., 1858)
- Willes genealogy at Descendant Chronicles
- The New York Annual Register for 1830 by Edwin Williams (pg. 248)

New York State Senate
Preceded by William I. Dodge	New York State Senate; Fourth District (Class 4); 1835–1838	Succeeded by Bethuel Peck
