= John W. Edmonds =

19th-century American politician and judge

John Worth Edmonds
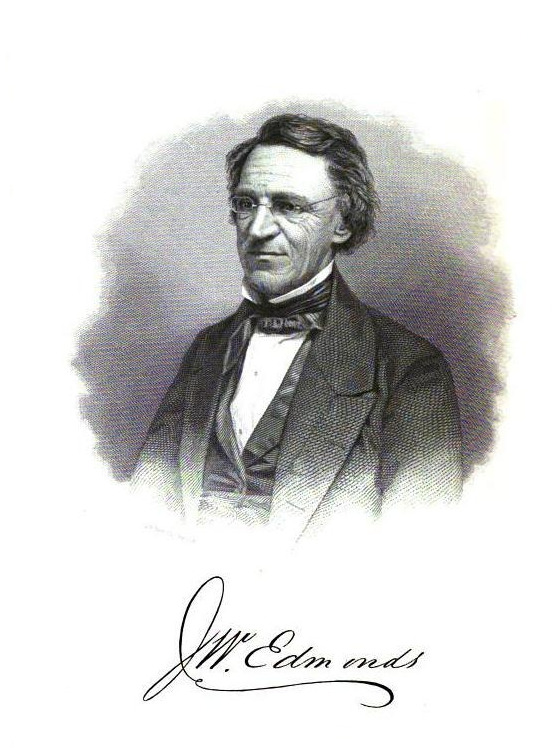
- Born: March 13, 1799; Hudson, New York, United States
- Died: April 5, 1874 (aged 75); New York City
- Occupations: Philanthropist, Children's Village co-founder

John Worth Edmonds (March 13, 1799 – April 5, 1874) was an American lawyer and politician from New York, and co-founder of Children's Village with 23 others.

== Life ==
He was the son of General Samuel Edmonds (1760–1825; assemblyman in 1803) and Lydia (Worth) Edmonds (1765–1841). He graduated from Union College in 1816. He was admitted to the bar in 1819, and commenced practice in Hudson. He married Sarah, and they had several children.

He was Recorder of the City of Hudson from 1827 to 1833. He was a member of the New York State Assembly (Columbia Co.) in 1831.

He was a member of the New York State Senate (3rd D.) from 1832 to 1835, sitting in the 55th, 56th, 57th and 58th New York State Legislatures.

In 1837, he was appointed U.S. Commissioner upon the Disturbance at the Potawatamie Payment—which had occurred in September 1836—and submitted a Report (1837; 42 pages; on-line version) to Commissioner of Indian Affairs Carey A. Harris.

In 1841, he removed to New York City, and resumed the practice of law there. In 1843, he was appointed a State Prison Inspector.

Edmonds was one of the defense lawyers for Monroe Edwards, a famous forger. Edwards tried to pay Edmonds for his services with a forged check.

He was Judge of the First Judicial District from 1845 to 1847, and a justice of the New York Supreme Court (1st D.) from 1847 to 1853.

In 1851 he became a Spiritualist, and published with Dr. George T. Dexter a work in two volumes on this belief:Spiritualism (Vol. I) (1853; on-line version) and Spiritualism (Vol. II) (1855; 542 pages; on-line version).

He died at his home at 71 Irving Place, in New York City, and was buried at the City Cemetery in Hudson.

== Sources ==
- The New York Civil List compiled by Franklin Benjamin Hough (pages 129f, 140, 210, 272, 350, 355 and 427; Weed, Parsons and Co., 1858)
- OBITUARY; Ex-Judge Edmonds in NYT on April 7, 1874
- Tombstone transcriptions from Hudson City Cemetery

Legal offices
| Preceded by William Kent | New York State Circuit Courts; First District; 1845–1847 | Succeeded by office abolished Jurisdiction taken over by the justices of the New York Supreme Court (1st D.) |
New York State Senate
| Preceded by Moses Warren | New York State Senate; Third District (Class 1); 1832–1835 | Succeeded by James Powers |
