= William Dietz (politician) =

American politician

New York State Senate (3rd D.)
- In office 1830–1833

Member of the U.S. House of Representatives from New York's 12th district
- In office March 4, 1825 – March 3, 1827
- Preceded by: Lewis Eaton
- Succeeded by: John I. De Graff

New York State Assembly (Schoharie Co.)
- In office 1814–1815
- In office 1823

Personal details
- Born: June 28, 1778 Schoharie, New York
- Died: August 24, 1848 (aged 70) Schoharie, New York
- Resting place: St. Paul’s Lutheran Cemetery
- Party: Jacksonian

Military service
- Allegiance: New York
- Branch/service: New York militia
- Rank: Colonel

William Dietz (June 28, 1778 – August 24, 1848) was an American farmer and politician from New York. From 1825 to 1827, he served one term in the U.S. House of Representatives.

== Life ==
He attended the district schools and engaged in agricultural pursuits. He was Town Clerk of Schoharie and Supervisor of Schoharie County.

=== Militia ===
He was a colonel of the State Militia.

=== State legislature ===
He was a member of the New York State Assembly (Schoharie Co.) in 1814, 1814–15 and 1823.

=== Congress ===
Dietz was elected as a Jacksonian to the 19th United States Congress, holding office from March 4, 1825, to March 3, 1827.

=== Return to legislature ===
He was a member of the New York State Senate (3rd D.) from 1830 to 1833, sitting in the 53rd, 54th, 55th and 56th New York State Legislatures.

=== Later career ===
He was a presidential elector in 1832, voting for Andrew Jackson and Martin Van Buren.

He was County Superintendent of the Poor from 1834 to 1835.

=== Death ===
He died on August 24, 1828, and was buried at the St. Paul's Lutheran Cemetery in Schoharie.

New York State Senate
Preceded by Ambrose L. Jordan	New York State Senate; Third District (Class 3); 1830–1833	Succeeded by John C. Kemble
U.S. House of Representatives
Preceded by Lewis Eaton	Member of the U.S. House of Representatives from New York's 12th congressional district 1825–1827	Succeeded by John I. De Graff
