= Henry Clay (1851 steamboat) =

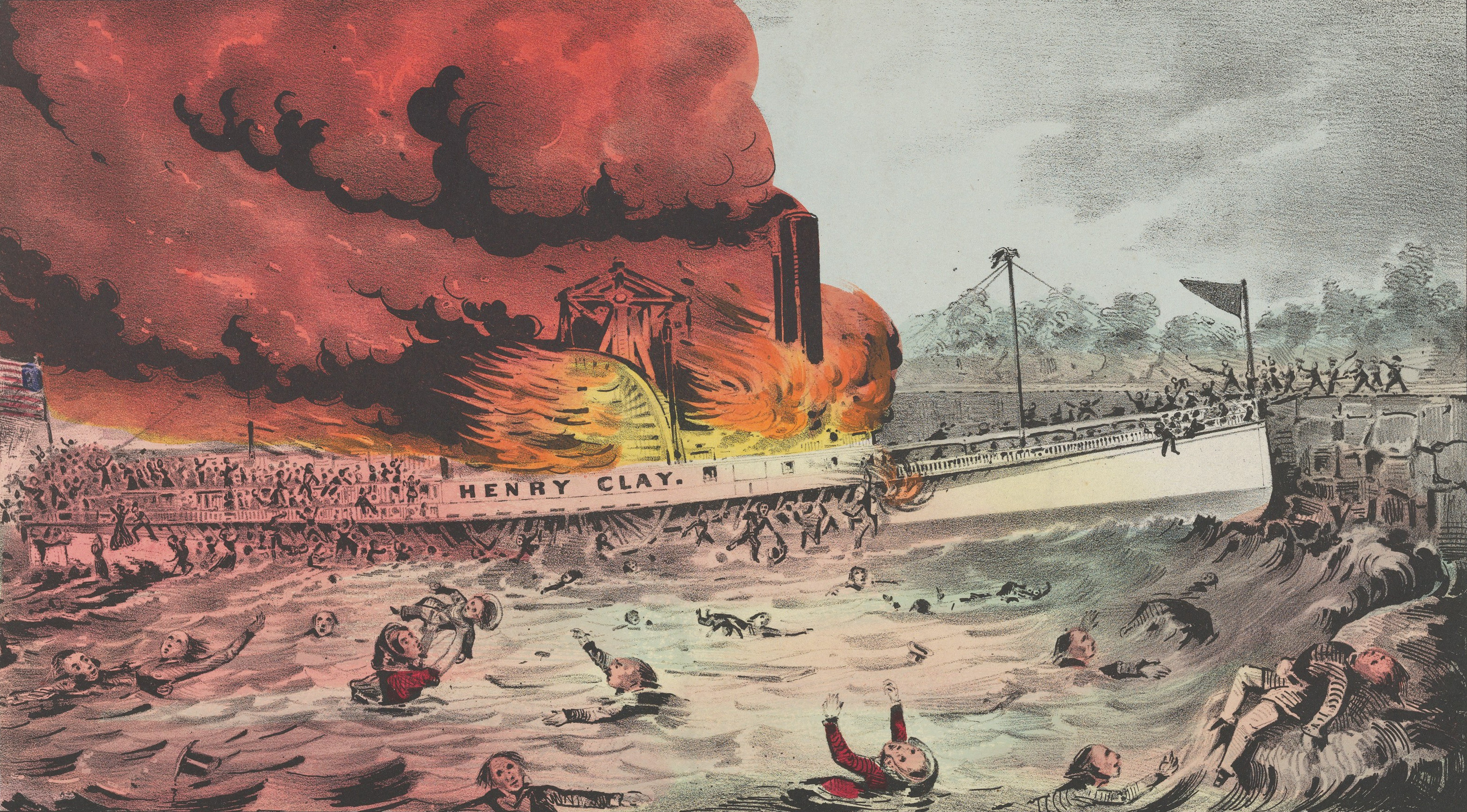
- Burning of Henry Clay - 1852 lithograph

History

United States
- Name: Henry Clay
- Namesake: Henry Clay
- Owner: Thomas Collyer, William Radford, & John Tallman
- Route: New York City – Albany
- Builder: Thomas Collyer, New York City
- Launched: August 1851
- Fate: Caught fire and destroyed, July 28, 1852

General characteristics
- Type: Side-wheel paddle steamer
- Length: 198 ft (60 m)
- Propulsion: Walking beam steam engine
- Capacity: 500 passengers

Henry Clay was an American side paddle wheel steamboat. Built in 1851, it caught fire while on a run on the Hudson River between Albany, New York and New York City on July 28, 1852. Between 50 and over 80 of its over 500 passengers died in what was the river's worst steam disaster, near Riverdale, in The Bronx, New York. It was the deadliest steamboat disaster in New York City, until the burning of the PS General Slocum in 1904.

The Clay competed with other steamships and the Hudson River Railroad, which was completed along the river's east shore to East Albany by 1851. On the day of the fire, the Henry Clay was racing another steamboat, a common practice of the day, as it was believed it would attract more passengers. In spite of the huge crowd aboard, there were only two lifeboats, which proved useless.

Similar to the latter sinking of the Titanic, many of the victims came from prestigious families, spurring excited press coverage. Among the known victims was Stephen Allen, a former mayor of New York City.

Several inquests and a high-publicity trial were held after the disaster. In spite of the media maelstrom, the owner and all the boat's officers were acquitted. However, the New York State Legislature soon passed a law prohibiting steamship racing on the Hudson, and Congress, previously reluctant to regulate steamboats, was forced by the public to push through aggressive new legislation.

== Background ==
The Henry Clay was built by Thomas Collyer in 1851. All that is known about its specifications is that it was 198 feet long, had a walking beam engine, and a promenade deck running its entire length. Collyer owned a five-eighths interest in it; William Radford, Esq. owned a two-eighths interest, and Captain John Tallman, the captain on the fateful run, owned the remaining one-eighth. The Henry Clay ran on routes up and down the Hudson River at various points of departure and varying distances between Albany, New York and New York City.

The Armenia, another Collyer built steamship, left Albany with the Clay on July 28, 1852. He was in command of the Clay, while the Armenia was owned and piloted by Captain Isaac Smith. According to Allynne Lange, curator of the Hudson River Maritime Museum, steamboat racing was common between captains. “The idea was the fastest boat would attract the most passengers.” As the Armenia and the Henry Clay raced south on the Hudson they made several stops to pick up passengers. The two steamboats had a minor collision while near Kingston Landing.

== Fire ==
As the Henry Clay passed Yonkers shortly before 3 p.m., the call of fire on board was heard. It roared up from the engine room and quickly engulfed the midsection. The pilot, Edward Hubbard, an experienced forty-three-year-old seaman, quickly turned the burning ship eastward to travel the mile distance to reach shore. Hubbard crashed the boat bow first onto the sands at Riverdale, New York, hoping to save his passengers. Those near the bow were easily able to jump to shore. However, the passengers aft of the fire were still in deep water and blocked from fleeing. Many could not swim and drowned either due to their heavy clothing or pulled below by others seeking to save their own lives. People that remained on the boat were burned to death.

Several passing boats including the Armenia and railcars from the Hudson River Railroad assisted victims. The railroad provided transportation to New York City and Albany for survivors and for the coffins of the dead.

== Notable victims ==
The disaster gained notoriety in part due to the great number of prestigious passengers – politicians, attorneys, professors, wealthy - aboard. Among them were:

- A. J. Downing – a landscape architect from Newburgh, New York, and editor of The Horticulturist, who set in motion the emergence of parks in cities. His home architecture brought people closer to nature. He was designing the grounds of the Smithsonian Institution at the time of his death.
- Caroline Amelia DeWindt – the granddaughter of the second President of the United States, John Adams, and the mother-in-law of A. J. Downing.
- Maria Louisa Hawthorne – youngest sister of author Nathaniel Hawthorne.
- Maria Slaughter-Bailey - wife of professor Jacob Whitman Bailey, and daughter (also named Maria). Bailey and nine year-old William Whitman Bailey survived. William became a prominent professor.
- Harriet and Eliza Kinsley - daughters of late West Point graduate and professor Z. J. D. Kinsley.
- Mrs. John L. Thompson – wife of the District Attorney of Lancaster County, Pennsylvania, and children Mary and Eugene.
- J. J. Speed, Esq. – a noted attorney from Philadelphia.
- Abraham Crist, Esq. – a noted attorney from Brooklyn and Member of the Common Council.
- Stephen Allen – a former Mayor of New York City.
- Harriet Elizabeth Proctor Colby - sister of U.S Senator Redfield Proctor and wife of Stoddard B. Colby

Unidentified victims of the Henry Clay fire are buried in a mass grave at St. John's Cemetery in Yonkers, New York, just north of where the disaster occurred.

== Inquest and trial ==
The principal inquest took place largely in Yonkers, New York. However, because several of the bodies were discovered in other towns, additional inquests were held in Manhattanville, New York, and Fort Lee and Hoboken, New Jersey. Survivors, relatives and family members were called to identify the dead and testify. As the days passed and details of the disaster emerged unrest among citizens and politicians, fueled by newspaper editorials, rose. The Inquest Panel charged the officers of the Henry Clay and its owner Thomas Collyer with murder.

More than a year later a trial commenced at the Circuit Court in New York City. Through political maneuvering the federal government had seized jurisdiction, deeming it regulated national waterways. Since there was no proof of premeditation on the part of the officers, the original charge of murder was reduced to manslaughter.

For two weeks the newspapers covered the trial testimony. Among the topics: who may have been in charge on the steamboat, that there were only two lifeboats on board, had there been enough water buckets on board in case of a fire, had the boat been overcrowded, had there been previous fires on the Henry Clay, and the possibility that the boiler safety valves were tied down to allow for more speed. The trial determined that while there had been racing it had occurred much farther upriver from the scene of the fire.

Also in question was the pilot Hubbard's action of running the steamboat bow first rather than coming along parallel to shore. Witnesses at the trial testified that Hubbard's action was correct and spared lives.

In spite of the maelstrom the media had created, all officers and the owner were acquitted of the charges against them. However, the New York State Legislature soon thereafter passed a law prohibiting steamship racing on the Hudson.

== Congressional legislation ==
The outcries across the country caused Congress to act. A month after the disaster Congress passed the Steamboat Act of 1852. It provided for stricter rules for steamboat operation and steamboat inspection and required licensing for pilots and engineers by the Steamboat Inspection Service whose responsibilities would eventually be folded into those of the U.S. Coast Guard.

== See also ==
- List of disasters in New York City by death toll
