= Herman I. Quackenboss =

American politician

Herman I. Quackenboss (January 8, 1792 Washington County, New York - November 19, 1874 Lansingburgh, Rensselaer County, New York) was an American politician from New York.

== Life ==
He was the son of John H. Quackenboss (1766–1853) and Catrina (Van Woert) Quackenboss (b. 1768). He married Elizabeth, and they had three children. Herman I. Quackenboss was a tanner.

He was a member of the New York State Assembly, from Delaware Co. in 1825; from Greene Co. in 1828; and from New York Co. in 1835.

He was a member of the New York State Senate (3rd D.) from 1831 to 1834, sitting in the 54th, 55th, 56th and 57th New York State Legislatures.

== Sources ==
- The New York Civil List compiled by Franklin Benjamin Hough (pages 128ff, 144, 202, 209, 216 and 298; Weed, Parsons and Co., 1858) [gives first name "Herman" on pg. 128ff, 144 and 216, "Harman" on pg. 202, "Harmon" on pg. 209, and erroneously "Henry" on pg. 129]
- Quackenboss genealogy at Family Tree Maker [gives first name "Harmen"]

New York State Senate
Preceded by John McCarty	New York State Senate; Third District (Class 4); 1831–1834	Succeeded by Abraham L. Lawyer
