= John G. McDowell =

American politician (1794–1866)

- Born: John Guy McDowell; February 25, 1794 Chemung, New York, U.S.
- Died: January 1, 1866 (aged 71) Chemung, New York, U.S.
- Resting place: Riverside Cemetery in Chemung
- Occupation: politician, bank president, associate judge
- Spouse: Laurinda Lowman (m. 1793–1859)
- Children: 9 children

John Guy McDowell (February 25, 1794 in Chemung, then in Tioga County, New York – January 1, 1866 in Chemung, now in Chemung County, New York) was an American politician from New York.

== Life ==
He was the son of Daniel McDowell (1763–1806) and Ruth (Drake) McDowell (1766–1854). He fought in the War of 1812 as a lieutenant. On December 21, 1815, he married Laurinda Lowman (1793–1859), and they had nine children.

He was a member of the New York State Assembly (Tioga Co.) in 1830 and 1831. At the same time, he was Postmaster of Chemung.

He was a member of the New York State Senate (6th D.) from 1832 to 1835, sitting in the 55th, 56th, 57th and 58th New York State Legislatures.

He was Postmaster of West Chemung (now Lowman, a hamlet in the Town of Chemung) from 1840 to 1842.

He secured the charter for, and was the first President of, the Chemung Canal Bank. He was also an associate judge of the Tioga County Court for some time.

McDowell was a presidential elector in the 1852 presidential election.

He was buried at the Riverside Cemetery in Chemung.

== Sources ==
- The New York Civil List compiled by Franklin Benjamin Hough (pages 129f, 143, 210f and 289; Weed, Parsons and Co., 1858)
- Table of the Post Offices in the United States (1831; pg. 72)
- Our County and Its People: A History of the Valley and County of Chemung by Ausburn Towner (1892; pg. 518)

New York State Senate
Preceded by Grattan H. Wheeler	New York State Senate; Sixth District (Class 1); 1832–1835	Succeeded by George Huntington
