= Harman B. Cropsey =

American politician

Harman Barkaloo Cropsey Jr. (circa 1775 – February 1859) was an American politician from New York.

== Life ==
He was the son of Lt. Harmanus Barkaloo Cropsey Sr. (1753–1830).

He was Sheriff of Richmond County, New York from 1829 to 1831.

He was a member of the New York State Senate (1st D.) from 1832 to 1835, sitting in the 55th, 56th, 57th and 58th New York State Legislatures.

In 1836, he was among the original incorporators of the Richmond County Mutual Insurance Company. In 1837, he was appointed one of the Commissioners in charge of building a new Richmond County courthouse. In 1839, he was appointed as one of the Commissioners to receive subscriptions for the capital stock of the New York and Staten Island Ferry Company, to be incorporated. In 1840, he was an associate judge of the Richmond County Court. In 1843, he was appointed the first Superintendent of Common Schools of Richmond County.

Painter Jasper F. Cropsey was his nephew.

== Sources ==
- The New York Civil List compiled by Franklin Benjamin Hough (pages 129f, 140 and 405; Weed, Parsons and Co., 1858)
- Laws of the State of New York (1836; pg. 117)
- Laws of the State of New York (1837; pg. 79)
- Laws of the State of New York (1839; pg. 157)
- The New York Annual Register for 1840 (pg. 415)
- Historic Richmond Town, Tysen Court and Center Street Reconstruction: Archaeological Sensitivity Assessment, by Joan H. Geismar (2001; pgs. 14 and 39)

New York State Senate
Preceded by John I. Schenck	New York State Senate; First District (Class 1); 1832–1835	Succeeded by Henry Floyd-Jones
