= Minthorne Tompkins =

American politician

Mangle Minthorne Tompkins (December 26, 1807 – June 5, 1881 New York City) was an American politician from New York.

== Life ==
He was the son of Daniel D. Tompkins (1774–1825) and Hannah (Minthorne) Tompkins (1781–1829). He was born while his father was Governor of New York. Assemblyman Jonathan G. Tompkins (1736–1823) was his grandfather; Congressman Caleb Tompkins (1759–1846) was his uncle.

He graduated from Union College in 1827.

In partnership with William J. Staples, he established the neighborhood of Stapleton, Staten Island.

He was a Jacksonian member of the New York State Assembly (New York Co.) in 1833 and 1834. He was a Democratic member of the New York State Senate (1st D.) in 1840 and 1841, while residing in Castleton, Staten Island. He resigned his seat on March 8, 1841.

In November 1852 he ran on the Free Democratic ticket for Governor of New York, but was defeated by Democrat Horatio Seymour.

"He broke with the Democratic Party over his opposition to slavery and was a founder of the Republican Party in New York State in 1855." As a colonel in the 73rd Regiment during the American Civil War, he raised 500 volunteers on Staten Island for the Union Army.

He was for some time a port warden of the Port of New York, and about 1869 was President of the Board of Port Wardens.

== Honor ==
Minthorne Street in Staten Island's Tompkinsville section is named for Minthorne Tompkins.

New York State Senate
Preceded by Henry Floyd-Jones	New York State Senate; First District (Class 1); 1840–1841	Succeeded by Morris Franklin
