= William Baker (New York politician) =

American lawyer and politician

William Baker (April 14, 1795 – November 6, 1871) was an American lawyer and politician.

== Life ==
Baker was born April 14, 1795, in Minden, Montgomery County, New York, the son of Thomas and Mary Baker. At the age of 22, he moved to Springfield, Otsego County, New York, to study law. In January 1826, he married Delia Bianca Crain of Warren, Herkimer County, New York. Her father was Rufus Crain, a prominent local physician, and her brother, William C. Crain, was Assembly Speaker in 1846.

Baker was a member of the New York State Assembly (Otsego Co.) in 1830, 1833 and 1834, and was Speaker in 1834.

On May 25, 1836, he was appointed a Canal Commissioner, and served until the removal of all Democratic commissioners by the newly elected Whig majority in the State Legislature in February 1840.

After his time in politics, he moved to Utica, where in 1845 he was chosen the first Recorder of the City (i.e. Deputy Mayor and City Judge). He was well known for his expertise in patent law.

Baker died on November 6, 1871, at his home in Utica, Oneida County, New York, and was interred in Forest Hill Cemetery in Utica.

== Sources ==
- History of Political Parties in the State of New-York by John Stilwell Jenkins (Alden & Markham, Auburn NY, 1846) [Name incorrectly given as William Baker, Jr.]
- List of Canal Commissioners at Rochester NY History
- Political Graveyard
- Google Books The New York Civil List compiled by Franklin B. Hough (pages 42 and 256; Weed, Parsons & Co., Albany NY, 1858)
- Obituary published in the Utica Weekly Herald on November 14, 1871

Political offices
Preceded by Charles L. Livingston	Speaker of the New York State Assembly; 1834	Succeeded by Charles Humphrey
