= Charles Winfield =

American politician

Charles Winfield was an American politician from New York.

== Life ==
He was a Jacksonian member of the New York State Assembly (Orange Co.) in 1832 and 1834.

== Sources ==
- The New York Civil List compiled by Franklin Benjamin Hough (pages 212, 215 and 317; Weed, Parsons and Co., 1858)
