= Mordecai Myers (New York politician) =

New York politician (1776–1871)

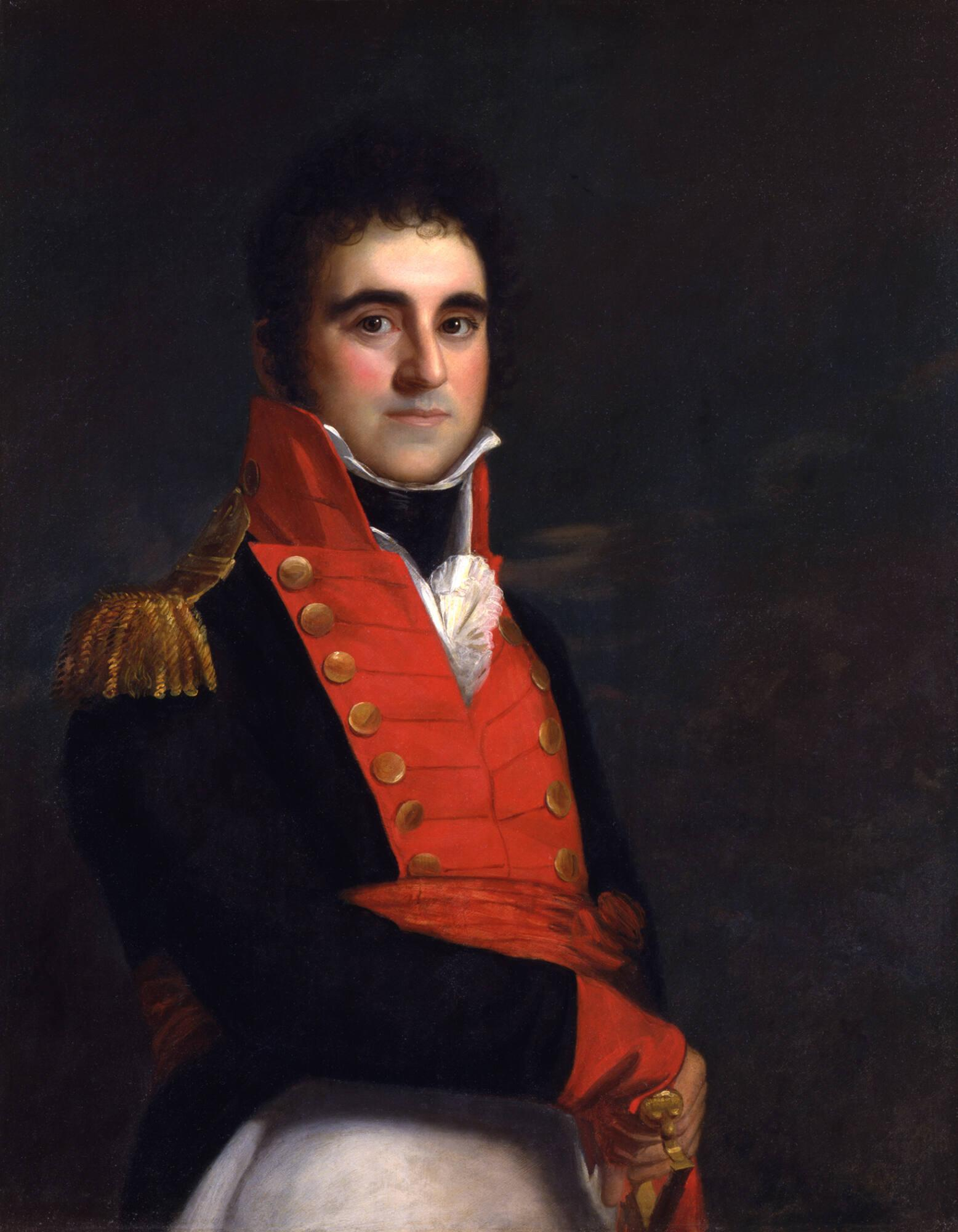
- Circa 1810 portrait by John Wesley Jarvis
- Born: May 31, 1776
- Died: January 20, 1871
- Spouse: Charlotte Bailey
- Children: Algernon Sydney Myers, Theodorus Bailey Myers
- Parents: Benjamin Myer (father); Rachel Myers (mother)

Mordecai Myers (May 31, 1776 – January 20, 1871) was a Jewish-American merchant, army officer, and politician from New York.

== Life ==
Myers was born on May 31, 1776, in Newport, Rhode Island. His father died that year, and in 1780 he moved to New York City, New York, with his family following the British evacuation from Newport. When the British acknowledged American independence in 1783, the family followed the Tories to Nova Scotia, Canada and lived there for a few years. He returned to New York City in 1787, and in 1789 he witnessed the first inauguration of George Washington.

Myers entered business as a young man and spent some time storekeeping with a partner in Richmond, Virginia. While there, he joined a military command under future Chief Justice of the United States John Marshall and had a hand in building the Kahal Kadosh Beth Shalome. Finding scant success in business, he returned to New York City. While there, he became a member of the New York Manumission Society and Tammany Hall. Following the advice of future Governor Daniel D. Tompkins, he began receiving military training under General De La Croix, one of Napoleon's generals. He was shortly afterwards commissioned a lieutenant, then a captain, of the first company of Col. Beekman's infantry regiment, the Seventh Regiment. He also did duty as major when the previous major died. Shortly afterwards, he became a captain in the 13th Infantry. He was twice wounded while fighting in the War of 1812, and while leading his men at the Battle of Crysler's Farm he was so badly wounded at the shoulder that 30 splinters had to be removed and he gave instruction for his interment and the disposal of his body.

Myers served in the New York State Assembly, representing New York County in 1829, 1831, 1832, 1833, and 1834. While in the Assembly, he served as Chairman of the Committee on Militia and Public Defense and secured the right for Quakers to decline military service (which until then was compulsory for all citizens regardless of religion). In 1836, he moved to Kinderhook and lived there for the next eight years. He returned to New York City due to financial reverses and spent some time in Chelsea. While living in Kinderhook, he was elected village president and, in that capacity, received and addressed Martin Van Buren upon his return to the village at the end of his term as President of the United States. He moved to Schenectady in 1848 and lived there for the rest of his life. He was elected mayor of Schenectady in 1851 and 1854. A Democrat, he unsuccessfully ran for a seat in the U.S. Congress in 1860 at the age of 84.

Myers joined the Freemasons in 1795. He was a charter member and first junior warden of a lodge in 1800 and served as its president in 1802, 1804, and 1805. He was Grand Marshal of the Grand Lodge of New York for many years and served as Chairman of the Committee of Arrangements for the Masonic reception given to the Marquis de Lafayette during his visit to America in 1824. He served as Deputy Grand Master of the Grand Lodge from 1829 to 1835 and was virtually the Grand Master, but he declined a nomination to serve as Grand Master and favored Morgan Lewis for the position. He was Grand Master of the Phillips Grand Lodge from 1852 to 1856 and the first Master of the Aurora Grata Lodge of Perfection. He was also a member of the Royal Arch Masonry, serving as Deputy Grand High Priest from 1831 to 1833 and as Grand High Priest in 1834.

Myers was a member of Congregation Shearith Israel in New York City by 1792, served as a trustee of the congregation from 1800 to 1805, and donated a large sum towards the construction of a new congregation in Greenwich Village. But following his marriage to a non-Jewish woman, he ceased his involvement with the Jewish community. While recovering from his wounds from the War of 1812, he was nursed back to health by Charlotte Bailey, the daughter of Judge William Bailey of Plattsburgh, the sister of Admiral Theodorus Bailey, and the niece of Senator Theodorus Bailey and Chancellor James Kent. They married in 1814. Their children included Charlotte (wife of architect Thomas R. Jackson), Kate, Henrietta (wife of Peter S. Hoes), Louisa, Edward, Mills, Theodore, Fannie (wife of Edgar M. Jenkins), and Colonel Theodorus Bailey. They had ten children.

Myers died in Schenectady on January 20, 1871. He was buried in his family plot at Vale Cemetery. His tombstone was designed by his son-in-law Thomas R. Jackson.
