= Allan Macdonald =

American politician

Allan Macdonald (November 21, 1794 White Plains, Westchester County, New York – January 1862) was an American politician from New York.

== Life ==
He was the son of Dr. Archibald Macdonald (d. 1813), a native of Scotland.

Allan Macdonald was Postmaster of White Plains from before 1825 until after 1833, and Sheriff of Westchester County from 1826 to 1828.

He was a member of the New York State Senate (2nd D.) from 1832 to 1835, sitting in the 55th, 56th, 57th and 58th New York State Legislatures.

He was Adjutant General of New York from 1836 to 1838; he succeeded Thomas W. Harman and was succeeded by Rufus King.

He was co-owner, with his brother Dr. James Macdonald (1803–1849), of a private insane asylum located since 1845 at Sanford Hall, the former residence of Chancellor Nathan Sanford (1777–1838) in Flushing, Queens.

New York State Senate
Preceded by Walker Todd	New York State Senate; Second District (Class 1); 1832–1835	Succeeded by John Hunter
