= Thomas W. Harman =

Adjutant General of New York (1836–1837)

Adjutant General of New York
- In office 1836–1837
- Preceded by: Allan Macdonald
- Succeeded by: Levi Hubbell

City Attorney of Albany, New York
- In office 1834–1837
- Preceded by: John Davis
- Succeeded by: William Parmalee

Military Secretary to the Governor of New York
- In office 1833–1835
- Preceded by: John T. Hildreth
- Succeeded by: Horatio Seymour

Clerk of the Albany County, New York Board of Supervisors
- In office 1832–1834
- Preceded by: James Van Ingen
- Succeeded by: Heman C. Whelpley

Personal details
- Born: 1807 Schenectady, New York, US
- Died: 11 March 1848 (aged 40–41) Albany, New York, US
- Resting place: Saint Georges Episcopal Church Cemetery, Schenectady, New York, US
- Party: Democratic
- Other political affiliations: Democratic-Republican; Jacksonian
- Spouse: Emily Van Benthuysen (m. 1834–1848)
- Children: 1
- Profession: Attorney

Thomas W. Harman (c. 1807 – 15 March 1848) was an American attorney and militia officer from New York. A native of Schenectady, he became active in politics, first as a Jacksonian, then as a Democrat. He served as Albany's city attorney from 1834 to 1837. After serving as military secretary for Governor William L. Marcy, he served as Adjutant General of New York from 1836 to 1837. Harman later moved back to Schenectady, where he resided until his death in 1848.

== Early life and start of career ==
Thomas W. Harman (Note: His last name is spelled as "Harmon" in some records.) was born in Schenectady, New York in 1807, (Note: Harman's gravestone gives his age as 40, which would make his birth year 1807 or 1808.) a son of Thomas Harman Jr. and Deborah (Dudley) Harman. He was raised and educated in Schenectady, then moved to Albany and became active in local politics and government, first as a Jacksonian, then as a Democratic-Republican. When the Jacksonian faction of the Democratic-Republicans began using the name Democrats, Harman continued his affiliation with the Democratic Party. Harman also studied law, and he was admitted to the bar as an attorney in April 1828. He was also appointed an examiner in chancery in April 1828, and in May 1831 he was admitted to practice as a counselor in the New York Court of Chancery.

Harman developed early in life a reputation as an effective orator and he was frequently call upon to give speeches at political meetings and public gatherings. In July 1829, he was the featured speaker at Albany's Independence Day celebration. In October 1830, he was a featured speaker at an Albany rally for Democratic-Republican candidates in the upcoming election for statewide offices. In April 1832, he was appointed a state commissioner of deeds, empowered to witness property transfers and other transactions. In September 1832, he was one of the leaders of and a featured speaker at a Democratic-Republican meeting that passed resolutions in support of the Andrew Jackson–Martin Van Buren ticket in that year's presidential election.

== Continued career ==
From 1832 to 1834, Harman served as clerk of the Albany County Board of Supervisors. From 1833 to 1835, he served as military secretary on the staff of William L. Marcy. From 1834 to 1837, he was Albany's city attorney. In October 1834, he was secretary of the city Third Ward Democratic Committee meeting the selected delegates to the upcoming county party convention, and he was selected as one of the delegates. In July 1835, he was a featured speaker at Albany's Independence Day commemoration, at which he delivered a well-received poem. In March 1836, Harman was one of the organizer's of the Hibernian Provident Society's St. Patrick's Day commemoration and gave one of the planned toasts. In September 1836, Marcy appointed Harman to succeed Levi Hubbell as Adjutant General of New York. In October 1836, he was a delegate to the combined Albany city and county Democratic convention that selected delegates to the upcoming state party convention. He served as adjutant general until January 1837 and was succeeded by Allan Macdonald.

In October 1837, he was a delegate to and a featured speaker at the Albany County Democratic convention. In June 1838, Harman was selected by the organizing committee for Albany's Independence Day commemoration to give its keynote address. In July 1838, he was a delegate to the Albany County Democratic convention, at which he was selected as a delegate to the upcoming state convention. In May 1839, he was a member of the First Ward Democratic meeting that nominated candidates for municipal office. Later that month, he was one of the election inspectors appointed by the city council to oversee voting in the First Ward. In July 1839, Harman was a member of the committee on arrangements that planned an Albany reception in honor of President Martin Van Buren. In September 1839, he was a delegate to the Albany County convention that nominated candidates for the New York State Assembly. In July 1840, Harman was one of the secretaries of the New York state Democratic meeting held to congratulate Van Buren on his signing of the Independent Treasury Act of 1840.

== Later career ==
Harman moved to Schenectady, New York in 1840, where he continued to practice law. In July 1841, he was one of the featured orators at Schenectady's Independence Day celebration, at which he delivered a poem that was received well by his audience. In November 1842, he was elected inspector of elections for Schenectady's Second Ward. In December 1842, Harman took part in a Democratic Party dinner organized by Schenectady Democrats; during the period for volunteers to offer toasts after completion of the formal program, he toasted Alonzo C. Paige and John C. Wright. In July 1843, he was again chosen as the Independence Day orator for Schenectady's public commemoration, which was praised in subsequent news accounts. In September 1844, Harman was one of the executive committee members of the county Democratic party who issued a call for delegates to attend a nominating convention to select candidates for the New York State Assembly and delegates to a nominating convention empowered to select a candidate for the United States House of Representatives.

In October 1847, Harman attended the Schenectady County Democratic convention as a delegate and was chosen as one of its secretaries. He died in Schenectady on 15 March 1848. Harman was buried at Saint Georges Episcopal Church Cemetery in Schenectady. In 1834, Harman married Emily Van Benthuysen of Albany. They were married until his death and were the parents of a son, Charles Dudley Harman, who was born in Albany in 1835. Charles Harman was an employee of the Pacific Mail Steamship Company when he died in Japan in 1892.
