= Isaac Gere =

American politician

Isaac Gere (1764 in Groton, New London County, Connecticut – May 12, 1849) was an American politician from New York.

== Life ==
He was the son of Isaac Gere and Mary (Leeds) Gere. He married Deborah Wright (1773–1849), and they had several children.

He was Supervisor of the Town of Galway in 1803, 1804, 1820 and 1821.

He was a member of the New York State Assembly (Saratoga Co.) in 1816 and 1824.

He was a member of the New York State Senate (4th D.) from 1830 to 1834, sitting in the 53rd, 54th, 55th and 56th New York State Legislatures.

He was buried at the Village Cemetery in Galway, NY.

== Sources ==
- The New York Civil List compiled by Franklin Benjamin Hough (pages 128f, 141, 191, 201 and 275; Weed, Parsons and Co., 1858)
- Tombstone transcriptions from Galway Village Cemetery
- History of Galway, NY (1899) transcription at Ray's Place
- Gere genealogy at

New York State Senate
Preceded by John L. Viele	New York State Senate; Fourth District (Class 3); 1830–1833	Succeeded by Isaac W. Bishop
