= Stephen Allen (American politician) =

American politician

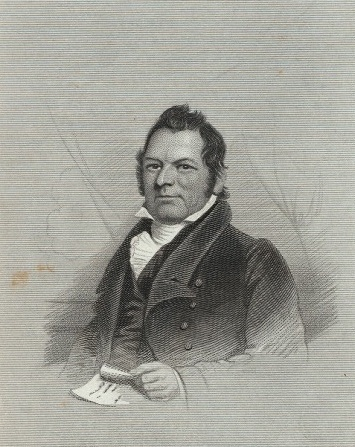

56th Mayor of New York
- In office December 1821 – 1824
- Preceded by: Cadwallader D. Colden
- Succeeded by: William Paulding, Jr.

Personal details
- Born: July 2, 1767 New York, Province of New York, British America
- Died: July 28, 1852 (aged 85) Riverdale, Bronx, U.S.
- Party: Federalist
- Relatives: Daisy Allen Story (granddaughter)

Stephen Allen (July 2, 1767 – July 28, 1852) was an American politician from New York. He was both mayor of New York City and a senator.

== Biography ==
Orphaned by the death of his parent(s) in the Revolutionary War, Allen grew to become a wealthy sailmaker.

Allen held many positions to include President of the Tradesman's Bank, the Mechanics Society, Director of the Mechanics Bank and the Hudson River Railroad company. He also played an important role in the introduction of water from the Croton Aqueduct to New York City.

He was the 56th Mayor of New York City from December 1821 to 1824, first appointed by the Council of Appointment in 1821 and then elected by the Board of Aldermen in 1823 and 1824.

He was a member of the New York State Assembly (New York Co.) in 1826.

He was a member of the New York State Senate (1st D.) from 1829 to 1832, sitting in the 52nd, 53rd, 54th and 55th New York State Legislatures.

In 1835, the same year as the Great Fire of New York, Allen moved to 1 Washington Square North, and led the commission that very quickly rebuilt New York's commercial center.

He died in the Henry Clay steamboat disaster on July 28, 1852, on the Hudson River near Riverdale in what was later called the Bronx and was buried at the New York City Marble Cemetery. A street in the Bronx is named in honor of Allen.

== See also ==
- List of mayors of New York City

== Sources ==
- List of Mayors at NYC website
- It Happened in Washington Square by Emily Kies Folpe (2002, Johns Hopkins University Press), ISBN 0-8018-7088-7
- The New York Civil List compiled by Franklin Benjamin Hough (pages 127ff, 138, 204, 255 and 428; Weed, Parsons and Co., 1858)

Political offices
Preceded by Cadwallader D. Colden	Mayor of New York City; 1821–1824	Succeeded by William Paulding, Jr.
New York State Senate
Preceded by Jacob Tyson	New York State Senate; First District (Class 2); 1829–1832	Succeeded by Myndert Van Schaick
