= John Griffin (Allegany County, New York) =

American politician

John Griffin (c. 1771 – February 9, 1846, Cuba, Allegany County, New York) was an American lawyer and politician from New York.

== Life ==
While living in Ontario County, New York, he fought in the War of 1812. He removed to Cuba NY in 1820. He was First Judge of the Allegany County Court from 1823 to 1833.

He was a member of the New York State Senate (8th D.) from 1833 to 1836, sitting in the 56th, 57th, 58th and 59th New York State Legislatures.

== Sources ==
- The New York Civil List compiled by Franklin Benjamin Hough (pages 129ff, 141 and 393; Weed, Parsons and Co., 1858)
- Death notice transcribed from the Cattaraugus Republican (issue of February 16, 1846)

New York State Senate
Preceded by Philo C. Fuller	New York State Senate; Fourth District (Class 2); 1833–1836	Succeeded by Samuel Works
