= William I. Dodge =

American politician

William Irving Dodge (c. 1789 Johnstown, then in Montgomery Co., now in Fulton County, New York – January 1873) was an American politician from New York.

== Biography ==
He was the son of Maj. Gen. Richard Dodge (1762–1832) and Ann Sarah (Irving) Dodge (1770–1808), a sister of Washington Irving (1783–1859). On January 23, 1812, he married Patience Akin (1793–1879), and they had five children. He fought in the War of 1812 as a captain, and took part in the Battle of Plattsburgh in September 1814.

== Career ==
He was a presidential elector in 1820, voting for James Monroe and Daniel D. Tompkins. He was District Attorney of Montgomery County from 1821 to 1830. In 1824, he ran for Congress in the 16th District, but was defeated by Henry Markell. He was a member of the New York State Senate (4th D.) from 1831 to 1834, sitting in the 54th, 55th, 56th and 57th New York State Legislatures. Afterwards he removed to Syracuse, New York, and resumed the practice of law there.

Col. Richard Irving Dodge was his nephew.

New York State Senate
Preceded by Duncan McMartin Jr.	New York State Senate; Fourth District (Class 4); 1831–1834	Succeeded by Jabez Willes
