= Charles L. Livingston =

American politician

Member of the New York State Senate (1st District)
- In office 1834–1837
- Preceded by: Alpheus Sherman
- Succeeded by: Gulian C. Verplanck

Speaker of the New York State Assembly
- In office 1832–1833
- Preceded by: George R. Davis
- Succeeded by: William Baker

Member of the New York State Assembly for New York County
- In office 1829-1833

Personal details
- Born: Charles Ludlow Livingston; 1800
- Died: April 1873 (aged 72–73)
- Party: Jacksonian
- Spouse: Margaret Allen (until 1873)
- Children: Catherine Livingston Langdon
- Parent(s): Cornelia Van Horne; Philip Peter Livingston
- Relatives: Philip Livingston (grandfather)

Charles Ludlow Livingston (1800 – April 1873) was an American politician from New York.

== Early life ==
Livingston was the son of Cornelia Van Horne Livingston (b. 1759) and Philip Peter Livingston (1740–1810), a New York State Senator from 1789 to 1793 and from 1795 to 1798. His surviving brother was Peter Van Brugh Livingston (1792–1868), the father of 9 children.

He was a grandson of Peter Van Brugh Livingston (1710–1792), a New York State Treasurer, and a great-great-grandson of Robert Livingston (1654–1728), the 2nd Lord of Livingston Manor.

== Career ==
Livingston was a member of the New York State Assembly (New York Co.) in 1829, 1830, 1831, 1832 and 1833; and was Speaker in 1832 and 1833. He was a Jacksonian.

He was a member of the New York State Senate (1st D.) from 1834 to 1837, sitting in the 57th, 58th, 59th and 60th New York State Legislatures.

== Personal life ==
He married Margaret Allen (1804–1873), and their only child was:

- Catherine Ludlow Livingston (1825–1883), who married to Walter Langdon (1822–1894), the son of Walter Langdon (1788–1847) and Dorothea Astor (1795–1874), in 1847. After her death, she was buried at St. James's Church in Hyde Park, New York.

Livingston died in April 1873.

Political offices
Preceded by George R. Davis	Speaker of the New York State Assembly; 1832–1833	Succeeded by William Baker
New York State Senate
Preceded by Alpheus Sherman	New York State Senate; First District (Class 3); 1834–1837	Succeeded by Gulian C. Verplanck
