= John C. Kemble =

American politician

John Cleveland Kemble (February 22, 1800 — April 14, 1843) was an American lawyer and politician from New York.

== Life ==
Kemble married Mary Ann Whipple on December 28, 1823. Their marriage produced two sons, Edward Cleveland Kemble and Rodney Albert Kemble, before Mary Ann (Whipple) Kemble died of consumption in 1831.

Kemble published the Troy Budget from 1827 to 1836 and was a member of the New York State Assembly representing Rensselaer County in 1832.

He was a member of the New York State Senate (3rd District) from 1834 to 1836, sitting in the 57th, 58th and 59th New York State Legislatures.

Kemble resigned his seat on May 22, 1836, after accusations of fraudulent stock trading.

Afterwards he removed to Rockford, Illinois, and practiced law there. In 1837, he married Charlotte M. Potts.

In 1840, Kemble became insane, and was taken to a mental hospital on the East Coast. He died three years later, and was buried at the Old South Cemetery in Ipswich, Massachusetts.

His son Edward Cleveland Kemble (1828–1886) took part in the Conquest of California, and edited the first English-language newspaper in California, the California Star. Edward Kemble was also the father of famous illustrator Edward Windsor Kemble (1861–1933).

== Sources ==
- The New York Civil List compiled by Franklin Benjamin Hough (pages 130f, 142, 213 and 285; Weed, Parsons and Co., 1858)
- The Lives and Opinions of Benjamin Franklin Butler and Jesse Hoyt by William Lyon Mackenzie (Cook & Co., Boston, 1845; Ch. XXX: "Bishop and Kemble's stock jobbing...", pg. 124ff)
- Marriage notice in The Rural Repository (Hudson NY, issue of October 14, 1837; pg. 71)
- History of Rockford and Winnebago County (Chapter X: "John C. Kemble: The First Lawyer")
- "Edward Kemble" at Media Museum of Northern California
- Short bio of E. W. Kemble at Book Rags

New York State Senate
Preceded by William Dietz	New York State Senate; Third District (Class 3); 1834–1836	Succeeded by Alonzo C. Paige
