= Josiah Fisk =

American politician

Josiah Fisk (September 8, 1781 in Haverhill, Grafton County, New Hampshire – August 10, 1844 in Keeseville, Clinton County, New York) was an American politician from New York.

== Life ==
He was the son of Amos Fisk and Mary (Wheeler) Fisk. In 1806, he married Phebe Peters (1785–1860), and they had seven children.

He was a member of the New York State Assembly (Clinton Co.) in 1825 and 1826.

He was a member of the New York State Senate (4th D.) from 1832 to 1835, sitting in the 55th, 56th, 57th and 58th New York State Legislatures.

He was President of the Temperance Society of Keeseville.

He was buried at the Keeseville Old Cemetery in Au Sable, New York.

== Sources ==
- The New York Civil List compiled by Franklin Benjamin Hough (pages 129f, 140, 202f and 273; Weed, Parsons and Co., 1858)

New York State Assembly
Preceded by Azariah C. Flagg	New York State Assembly; Clinton Co. 1825–1826	Succeeded by Bela Edgerton
New York State Senate
Preceded by Reuben Sanford	New York State Senate; Fourth District (Class 1); 1832–1835	Succeeded by David Spraker
