= Robert Lansing (state senator) =

American politician (1799–1878)

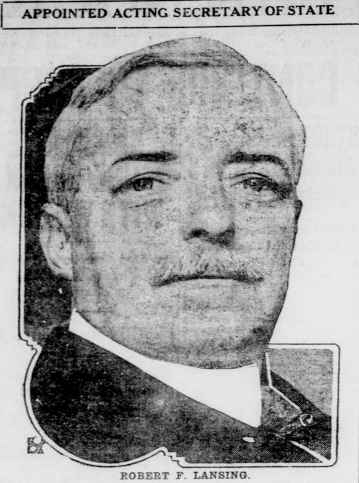
- Robert Lansing

Member of the New York State Senate 21st District
- In office 1854–1855
- Preceded by: Ashley Davenport
- Succeeded by: Gardner Towne

Member of the New York State Senate 5th District
- In office 1832–1835
- Preceded by: Nathaniel S. Benton
- Succeeded by: Micah Sterling

Personal details
- Born: February 2, 1799 Albany, New York
- Died: October 3, 1878 (aged 79)
- Spouses: Maria Hubbard (m. 1831; died 1839) Cornelia Hubbard (after 1841)
- Relations: Robert Lansing (grandson); John Lansing Jr. (uncle); Abraham G. Lansing (uncle); Gerrit Y. Lansing (cousin); Frederick Lansing (nephew)
- Parent(s): Sanders G. Lansing; Catherine Ten Eyck Lansing
- Education: Union College

Robert Lansing (/ˈlænsɪŋ/; February 2, 1799 – October 3, 1878) was an American lawyer and politician from New York.

== Early life ==
He was the son of Judge Sanders Gerritse Lansing (1766–1850) and Catherine (née Ten Eyck) Lansing (1769–1850). Chancellor John Lansing Jr. and State Treasurer Abraham G. Lansing were his uncles; Congressman Gerrit Y. Lansing was his first cousin; and Congressman Frederick Lansing was his nephew. His maternal grandparents were Abraham Ten Eyck and Annatje (née Lansing) Ten Eyck.

He attended Union College but did not graduate.

== Career ==
In 1817, he removed to Watertown, studied law there with Egbert Ten Eyck, and was admitted to the bar in 1820. He was District Attorney of Jefferson County from 1826 to 1833, when he was succeeded by George C. Sherman (the father-in-law of his nephew Frederick Lansing).

He was a member of the New York State Senate (4th D.) from 1832 to 1835, sitting in the 55th, 56th, 57th and 58th New York State Legislatures. Afterwards he practiced law in partnership with George C. Sherman, who was then his brother-in-law.

He was again District Attorney of Jefferson County from 1845 to 1846; First Judge of the Jefferson County Court from 1847 to 1851; Supervisor of the Town of Watertown in 1852; and again a member of the State Senate (21st D.) in 1854 and 1855.

== Personal life ==
On December 22, 1831, he married Maria Hubbard (1802–1839), the eldest daughter of Noadiah Hubbard and Eunice (née Ward) Hubbard. Together, they were the parents of several children, only one of whom lived to maturity:

- John Lansing (1832–1907), the father of U.S. Secretary of State Robert Lansing.

On February 2, 1841, Lansing married Cornelia Hubbard (1804–1885), a younger sister of his first wife. Together, they were parents of:

- Cornelia M. Lansing (1843–1926)

Lansing died on October 3, 1878. He was buried at the Brookside Cemetery in Watertown.

== Sources ==
- Lansing genealogy at RootsWeb

New York State Senate
Preceded by Nathaniel S. Benton	New York State Senate; Fifth District (Class 1); 1832–1835	Succeeded by Micah Sterling
Preceded by Ashley Davenport	New York State Senate; 21st District; 1854–1855	Succeeded by Gardner Towne
