= Myndert Van Schaick =

American politician (1782–1865)

Member of the New York State Senate First District (Class 2)
- In office January 1, 1833 – May 22, 1836
- Preceded by: Stephen Allen
- Succeeded by: Frederick A. Tallmadge

Personal details
- Born: September 2, 1782 Albany, New York
- Died: December 1, 1865 (aged 83) New York City, New York
- Resting place: New York Marble Cemetery
- Spouse: Elizabeth Hone (after 1815)
- Parent(s): Goose Van Schaick; Maria Ten Broeck
- Occupation: Philanthropist, co-founder of Children's Village

Myndert Van Schaick (September 2, 1782 in Albany, New York – December 1, 1865 in New York City) was an American politician from New York and co-founder of Children's Village with 23 others.

== Early life ==
He was the son of Brigadier General Goose Van Schaick (1736–1789), a Continental Army officer during the American Revolutionary War, and Maria (née Ten Broeck) Van Schaick (1750–1829).

His paternal grandparents were Sybrant Van Schaick, who served as Mayor of Albany, New York from 1756 to 1761, and Alida (née Rosebloom) Van Schaick. His mother was the eldest of ten daughters born to John Tobias Ten Broeck (himself the son of Dirck Wesselse Ten Broeck).

== Career ==
Van Schaick was a member of the New York State Assembly (New York Co.) in 1832, and an Alderman of New York City (5th Ward) in 1832–33. At the same time he was Treasurer of the Board of Health of New York City, while a cholera epidemic ravaged the city.

He was a member of the New York State Senate (1st D.) from 1833 to 1836, sitting in the 56th, 57th, 58th and 59th New York State Legislatures. He was also an Assistant Alderman of New York City (5th Ward) in 1835–36. He resigned his seat in the State Senate on May 22, 1836.

During his tenure in the City Council, Assembly and State Senate, he was the driving force behind the planning, and enacting of the pertinent legislation, of the construction of the Croton Aqueduct. When the aqueduct was inaugurated in 1842, Van Schaick was appointed to the Water Board, and remained in office until 1848, part of the time as chairman. He was President of the Board of Commissioners of the Croton Aqueduct Department from 1855 to 1860.

== Personal life ==
In 1815, he married Elizabeth Hone, daughter of John Hone and niece of Philip Hone (1780–1851), also a Mayor of New York City. Together, they were the parents of:

- Mary Van Schaick, who married William B. Oddie in 1849.
- Joanna Van Schaick (d. 1819), who died young.
- John Hone Van Schaick (d. 1841).
- Henry Van Schaick (1825–1914), who married Charlotte Sargent Gray (1832–1912), daughter of Samuel C. Gray.

Van Schaick died at his residence on December 1, 1865. He was buried at the New York Marble Cemetery.

=== Descendants ===
Through his daughter Elizabeth, he was the grandfather of Elizabeth Van Schaick Oddie, who married Grenville Winthrop (1837–1869), the son of Thomas Charles Winthrop (1797–1873) and brother of Robert Winthrop (1833–1892).

Through his son Henry, he was the grandfather of Mary Van Schaick (1858–1858), who died young, Henry Sybrant Van Schaick (1859–1901), who died unmarried, George Gray Van Schaick (1861–1924), who married Alice Monson (1871–1953), Elizabeth Van Schaick (b. 1863), who married Count Alexander in Florence, Italy on June 8, 1886, and Eugene Van Schaick (1865–1916), who married Minnie Delamater Haulenbeck (1863–1922), daughter of Peter Delamater and Ellen (née Kronkjeit) Haulenbeck.

New York State Senate
Preceded by Stephen Allen	New York State Senate; First District (Class 2); 1833–1836	Succeeded by Frederick A. Tallmadge
