= Ashley Davenport =

American politician

Member of the New York Senate from the 21st district
- In office 1852–1853
- Preceded by: Caleb Lyon
- Succeeded by: Robert Lansing

Personal details
- Born: February 12, 1794 Copenhagen, New York
- Died: February 10, 1874 (aged 79) Copenhagen, New York
- Party: Democratic

Ashley Davenport (February 12, 1794 – February 10, 1874) was an American farmer, merchant, county judge, high sheriff, and politician from New York.

== Life ==
Davenport was born in Copenhagen, New York. He was a member of the New York State Senate (21st D.) in 1852 and 1853. Davenport also held the positions of county judge and high sheriff for Lewis County, New York.

== Sources ==
- The New York Civil List compiled by Franklin Benjamin Hough (pp. 137 and 140; Weed, Parsons and Co., 1858)
- American Biographical Notes by Franklin B. Hough (p. 99)

New York State Senate
Preceded by Caleb Lyon	New York State Senate; 21st District; 1852–1853	Succeeded by Robert Lansing
