= Louis Hasbrouck =

American politician (1777–1834)

Louis Hasbrouck (April 22, 1777 - August 20, 1834) was an American lawyer and politician from New York.

== Life ==
He graduated from the College of New Jersey in 1797. Then he studied law with Josiah Ogden Hoffman in New York City, was admitted to the bar in 1801 and commenced practice in Ogdensburgh.

He was Clerk of St. Lawrence County from 1802 to 1811, and from 1813 to 1817.

He was a member of the New York State Assembly (St. Lawrence Co.) in 1814, noted as being the sole resident slaveholder from Ogdensburgh and a British sympathizer during the war of 1812.

He was a member of the New York State Senate (4th D.) from 1833 until his death, sitting in the 56th and 57th New York State Legislatures.

He died of apoplexy at his residence in Ogdensburg, and was buried at the Ogdensburg Cemetery.

Congressman Abraham J. Hasbrouck was his brother.

== Personal life ==
He was the son of Joseph Hasbrouck (1744–1808) and Elizabeth (Bevier) Hasbrouck (1749–1795), and was baptized at Shawangunk, Ulster County, New York. His father was a Lieutenant Colonel in the United States Army during the Revolutionary War, and then served as Brigadier General of the 3rd Ulster County Regiment of New York from 1784-1787. He also served as the Supervisor of the town of New Paltz in 1777 and from 1782 to 1783; was a member of the New York State Assembly (Ulster Co.) in 1786 and 1791-1792; and member of the New York State Senate from 1793 to 1796.

Louis descends from five of the 12 New Paltz patentees, or founders: Abraham Hasbrouck, Christian Deyo (four different lines), Louis Bevier, Louis DuBois (Huguenot), and Jean Hasbrouck (three different lines).

On December 29, 1802 in New Paltz, he married Catherine Banks (1778–1862), and they had at least six children:

1. Catherine Banks Hasbrouck (1804-1892); never married.
2. Elizabeth Bevier Hasbrouck (1806-1895); never married.
3. Sarah S. Hasbrouck (1809-1886); married Edwin Clark, had issue.
4. Louis Hasbrouck Jr. (1814-1880); married 1st Louise Seymour Allen (1817-1848); married 2nd, his cousin, Sarah Maria Hasbrouck (1823-1858), daughter of Levi Hasbrouck (1791-1861) and Hylah Bevier (1795-1874), and granddaughter of Josiah Hasbrouck.
  1. Louis Hasbrouck III (1840-1928)
  2. Philip Allen Hasbrouck (1842-1871)
  3. Harriet Louise Seymour Hasbrouck (1843-1909)
  4. Levi Hasbrouck (1851-1927)
  5. Bevier Hasbrouck (1853-1870)
  6. Laura Maria Hasbrouck (1857-1933)
5. Louisa Hasbrouck (1817-1869); married Richard Kruger, had issue.
6. Jane Hasbrouck (1819-1911); never married.

His first cousin was Abraham Bruyn Hasbrouck.

== Sources ==
- The New York Civil List compiled by Franklin Benjamin Hough (pages 129f, 141, 188, 279 and 393; Weed, Parsons and Co., 1858)
- History of New Paltz, and Its Old Families (Albany, 1909; pg. 385f)
- Death notice in American Railroad Journal (issue of August 30, 1834; pg. 541)
- Hasbrouck genealogy at Chrisman Families

New York State Assembly
Preceded by Roswell Hopkins	New York State Assembly; St. Lawrence Co. 1814	Succeeded by David A. Ogden
New York State Senate
Preceded by John McLean Jr.	New York State Senate; Fourth District (Class 2); 1833–1834	Succeeded by Samuel Young
