= John Birdsall (politician, born 1802) =

American politician

New York State Assembly
- In office January 1, 1831 – December 31, 1831
- Preceded by: Abner Hazeltine
- Succeeded by: Theron Bly

Personal details
- Born: 1802
- Died: July 22, 1839 (aged 36–37) Houston, Texas
- Party: Anti-Masonic
- Occupation: Politician

John Birdsall (1802 – July 22, 1839) was an American lawyer and politician from New York and Texas.

== Biography ==
=== New York ===
Born in the town of Greene in New York's Chenango County, he was the son of Maurice Birdsall (1774–1852) and Ann (Pixley) Birdsall (1778–1829). He married Ann Whiteside (1805–1833), and then Sarah Peacock (1816–1895). New York State Treasurer Alvah Hunt was Birdsall's brother-in-law.

He was admitted to the bar, and practiced in Mayville, New York.

He was Judge of the Eighth Circuit Court from 1826 to 1829.

He was a member of the New York State Assembly (Chautauqua Co.) in 1831 alongside Squire White

He was a member of the New York State Senate (6th D.) from 1832 to 1834, sitting in the 55th, 56th and 57th New York State Legislatures. He resigned his seat on June 5, 1834.

=== Texas ===
In 1837, he removed to Houston, then the capital of the independent Republic of Texas, and resumed the practice of law there. The same year, he was appointed Attorney General of the Republic of Texas. In November 1838, he was appointed by President Sam Houston as Chief Justice of the Supreme Court of the Republic of Texas, to fill the vacancy caused by the death of James Collinsworth, but the Texas Congress did not confirm the appointment, and instead elected Thomas Jefferson Rusk a few days after Houston left the presidency.

Afterwards he resumed the practice of law in partnership with Houston, but died a few months later in Houston at the age of 37 and was buried at the city's Glendale Cemetery.

Neither Collinsworth nor Birdsall ever convened the Supreme Court, the first session was held in January 1840, six months after Birdsall's death, with Rusk as chief justice.

Legal offices
Preceded by William B. Rochester	New York State Circuit Courts; Eighth District; 1826–1829	Succeeded by Addison Gardiner
New York State Senate
Preceded by Timothy H. Porter	New York State Senate; Eighth District (Class 1); 1832–1834	Succeeded by Chauncey J. Fox
Legal offices
Preceded by Peter W. Grayson	Attorney General of the Republic of Texas; 1837–1838	Succeeded by John Charles Watrous
Preceded by James Collinsworth	Chief Justice of the Supreme Court of the Republic of Texas; 1838	Succeeded by Thomas Jefferson Rusk
