= Jabez Parkhurst =

- Born: October 24, 1785; Sharon
- Died: October 31, 1865 (aged 80)
- Alma mater: University of Vermont
- Occupation: Lawyer, politician, abolitionist
- Position held: member of the New York State Assembly

Jabez Parkhurst (October 24, 1785 – October 31, 1865) was an American abolitionist, lawyer, and politician in Fort Covington, New York.

Jabez Parkhurst was born on October 24, 1785 in Sharon, Vermont, the ninth of twelve children of Ebenezer Parkhurst. He graduated from the University of Vermont in 1810. He was briefly at teacher at the Franklin Academy in Malone, New York.

Shortly after being admitted to the bar in 1814, he permanently relocated to Fort Covington to practice law. One of his cases was acting as one of four defense lawyers for Stephen Videto, who was tried and convicted of murdering Fanny Mosely in 1825.

Parkhurst was elected to the New York State Assembly in 1833 and 1834 as a member of the Anti-Masonic Party. He unsuccessfully ran again in 1841 as a member of the Liberty Party.

An ardent abolitionist, Parkhurst served as president of the Franklin Anti-Slavery Society and was vice-president of the New York State Anti-Slavery Society in 1840. His house was a stop on the Underground Railroad; runaway slaves were hidden there until they were taken to the Canadian border a half-mile away.

Jabez Parkhurst died on 31 October 1865.
