= Silas M. Stilwell =

American politician

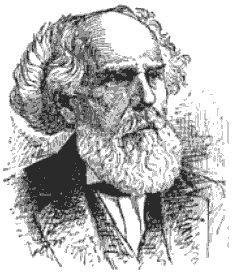
- Born: Silas Moore Stilwell; June 6, 1800; New York, New York
- Died: May 16, 1881 (aged 80); New York, New York
- Occupations: Lawyer, politician
- Political party: Whig
- Spouse: Caroline Norseworthy

Silas Moore Stilwell, Sr. (June 6, 1800 – May 16, 1881) was an American lawyer and politician.

== Biography ==
He was born on June 6, 1800, in New York City to Stephen Stilwell, who had fought in the American Revolutionary War and opened a glass factory in 1804 in Woodstock, New York.

Silas was educated at Woodstock Free Academy until 1812, then, after his father's bankruptcy, he went to New York City and began to work.

In 1814, he engaged in surveying in the west, and then settled in Tennessee. In 1822, he was a member of the Tennessee House of Representatives. Afterwards he removed to Virginia, and was Clerk of Tazewell County and a member of the Virginia House of Delegates. He was admitted to the bar in 1824.

He returned to New York in 1828, and was a member from New York County of the New York State Assembly from 1830 to 1833. In 1830, he proposed "An act to abolish imprisonment for debt and to punish fraudulent debtors" in the Assembly, which was enacted on April 26, 1831, and became known as the Stilwell Act.

In 1834, he ran for Lieutenant Governor of New York on the Whig ticket with William H. Seward, but they were defeated. He was an alderman in New York City in 1835, and chosen chairman of the Board of Aldermen. In this year, the political parties were equally divided, and as he had the casting vote on all appointments he became popularly known as "King Caucus". He was acting mayor at the time of the Great Fire of New York in 1835.

He was married Caroline Norseworthy (1820-?) around 1840, and one of their children was Silas Moore Stilwell, Jr. (1854–1891), a lawyer in New York City.

He was United States Marshal for the Southern District of New York during President John Tyler's administration from 1841 to 1845. At this time he was sent on a special mission to The Hague to negotiate a loan for the U.S. government. At the end of his term he resumed the practice of law.

He was the author of the National Banking Act in 1863.

He wrote on questions of finance, many of his articles appeared in the New York Herald from 1860 to 1872, under the pen-name of "Jonathan Oldbuck".

He died on May 16, 1881, in New York City.

== Works ==
- "The Stilwell Act of 1831" [An Act to abolish imprisonment for debt, punish fraudulent debtors passed April 26, 1831]. U.S. Library of Congress. Albany, New York: Elliott and Palmer. April 26, 1831. LCCN 92838635.
- "Silas M. Stilwell to James Madison, September 14, 1831". The James Madison Papers at the Library of Congress. U.S. Library of Congress. September 14, 1831.
- "Report of the Select Committee of the Assembly, on the Expediency of a Total Abolition of Capital Punishment in the state of New York". U.S. Library of Congress. Albany, New York: Packard, Hoffman & White. March 7, 1832. LCCN 92838634.
- "Silas M. Stilwell to James Madison, May 19, 1832". The James Madison Papers at the Library of Congress. U.S. Library of Congress. May 19, 1832.
- A System of Credit for a Republic and Plan of a Bank for the State of New York (1838).
- "A System of National Finance: Notes Explanatory of Mr. Chase's Plan of National Finance". Hathitrust Digital Library. U.S. Government Printing Office. 1861. OCLC 64750969.
- National Finances: a Philosophical Examination of Credit (1866)
- "Private History of the Origin and Purpose of the National Banking Law and System of Organized Credits for the United States". Hathitrust Digital Library. U.S. Government Printing Office. 1879. OCLC 29943072.
