= Selah R. Hobbie =

American politician

Selah Reeve Hobbie

Member of the U.S. House of Representatives from New York's 11th district
- In office March 4, 1827 – March 3, 1829
- Preceded by: Henry Ashley
- Succeeded by: Perkins King

Personal details
- Born: March 10, 1797 Newburgh, New York, U.S.
- Died: March 23, 1854 (aged 57) Washington, D.C., U.S.

Selah Reeve Hobbie (March 10, 1797 – March 23, 1854) was an American lawyer and politician who served one term as a U.S. representative from New York from 1827 to 1829.

== Biography ==
Born in Newburgh, New York, Hobbie studied law. He was admitted to the bar and commenced practice in Delhi, New York.

=== Career ===
He served as district attorney of Delaware County from 1823 to 1827. He was a member of the State assembly 1827 to 1829. He also served in the militia as brigade major and inspector.

=== Congress ===
Hobbie was elected as a Jacksonian to the Twentieth Congress (March 4, 1827 – March 3, 1829).

=== Later career and death ===
He was appointed Assistant Postmaster General and served from 1829 until 1851, when he resigned on account of ill health. He was appointed First Assistant Postmaster General and served from March 22, 1853, until his death in Washington, D.C., March 23, 1854.

He was interred in Congressional Cemetery, Washington, D.C., on March 26, 1854.

== Sources ==
- United States Congress. "Selah R. Hobbie (id: H000662)". Biographical Directory of the United States Congress.

U.S. House of Representatives
Preceded by Henry Ashley	Member of the U.S. House of Representatives from New York's 11th congressional district 1827–1829	Succeeded by Perkins King
