= Isaac H. Maynard =

American judge (1838–1896)

Isaac Horton Maynard (April 9, 1838 in Bovina, Delaware County, New York – June 13, 1896 in Albany, New York) was an American lawyer and politician from New York.

== Life ==
He was the son of Isaac Maynard and Jane (Falconer) Maynard. He graduated from Amherst College in 1862. Then he studied law at Delhi, New York, and was admitted to the bar in 1865. About that time, he entered politics and was a Town Supervisor and then President of the Board of Supervisors of Delaware County.

He was a member of the New York State Assembly (Delaware Co., 2nd D.) in 1876 and 1877. He was First Judge and Surrogate of the Delaware County Court from 1878 to 1885.

In 1883 he ran for Secretary of State of New York but was the only candidate defeated on the Democratic ticket. In 1886, he was appointed First Deputy New York Attorney General. Later that year, he was appointed Second Comptroller of the Treasury. In 1887, he was appointed by Charles S. Fairchild as Assistant U.S. Secretary of the Treasury and remained in office until the end of the First Cleveland administration.

Afterwards he was appointed Deputy New York Attorney General again. As such, in November 1891, he was counsel to the State Board of Canvassers (made up by the Secretary of State, State Treasurer, State Comptroller, Attorney General and State Engineer), when the electoral fraud in the Dutchess County senatorial election happened by which Governor David B. Hill gained control of the New York State Senate. The Republican incumbent, Gilbert A. Deane, had received more votes than his Democratic challenger Edward B. Osborne, but the County Board of Canvassers did not allow 31 votes, which had ink marks on the edge, which could have been made by printers' quads, and declared Osborne elected. The Republicans questioned the County Board's decision in court and, on December 5, Judge Barnard ordered the votes to be counted and instructed the County Clerk to inform the corrected result to the State Board. Judge Fursman ordered a stay of Barnard's decision. On December 19, Justice Edgar M. Cullen, of the New York Supreme Court, vacated Fursman's stay, and in the evening of December 21, County Clerk Emans mailed the corrected result to Albany.

On the same day however, Justice Ingraham had stayed Cullen's decision, and Emans was accused of contempt of court. Emans traveled to Albany himself and appeared at Maynard's home at half past 8 a.m. next morning demanding to have the corrected result returned to him. Maynard and Emans went to the New York State Comptroller's office, and Maynard subtracted the letter from the incoming-mail pile and handed it over to Emans, explaining to the office employees that the letter had been misdirected. Subsequently, the original result was canvassed by the State Board, and the Democratic candidate was declared elected, giving the Democrats a majority in the New York State Senate.

In January 1892, he was appointed to the New York Court of Appeals to fill the vacancy caused by the appointment of Robert Earl as Chief Judge after the death of William C. Ruger. Two weeks later, his connexion with the Emans letter became known to the public during Emans's trial for contempt. The Bar Association inquired, and Maynard had a lot of explaining to do. The New York State Legislature, having a Democratic majority, hurriedly looked at the case and found nothing to say. After some legal pettyfogging, the Democratic politicians continued to support Maynard, as reward for his service to the Party, but public indignation never subsided.

In January 1893, Maynard was re-appointed to the Court of Appeals, to fill the vacancy caused by the election of Charles Andrews as Chief Judge, although the Bar Association had urged the Governor against it.

At the New York state election, 1893, running on the Democratic ticket for a full term on the Court of Appeals, he was not only defeated by Republican Edward T. Bartlett, but weighed down the whole ticket so heavily that, although even the Republican-leaning New York Times had predicted a Democratic victory, the whole Republican ticket of political newcomers (with a house-painter as Secretary of State) was elected.

In 1896, he died suddenly of a heart attack in his room at the Kenmore Hotel in Albany. Maynard was buried at the Woodland Cemetery in Delhi.

== Marriage and Family ==
Isaac Horton Maynard married on June 28, 1871, Margaret Maxwell Marvin, daughter of Charles Marvin and Frances (Foote) Marvin, of Delhi, NY. Maynard may have owed at least some of his political appointments to his wife. Margaret Marvin came from a fairly prominent New York political family: her mother Frances was the daughter of Congressman Charles A. Foote, and Margaret's uncle Rensselaer William Foote died during the American Civil War as a major in the 6th United States Infantry.

== Sources ==
- Court of Appeals judges at New York Court History
- Portrait at the Court of Appeals
- Isaac Horton Maynard in NYT on October 7, 1893
- EX-JUDGE MAYNARD DEAD in NYT on June 13, 1896
- David Murray, LL. D., Delaware County, New York, Centennial History, Delhi, 1898.
- W..H. Munsell & Co. [publishers], History of Delaware County, N.Y., With Illustrations, Biographical Sketches and Portraits of Some Pioneers and Prominent Residents /1797–1880/, N.Y.C., 1880.

New York State Assembly
Preceded by George G. Decker	New York State Assembly; Delaware County, 2nd District; 1876–1877	Succeeded by Robert P. Cormack
