= Public Vault at the Congressional Cemetery =

- Public Vault
- U.S. Historic district – Contributing property
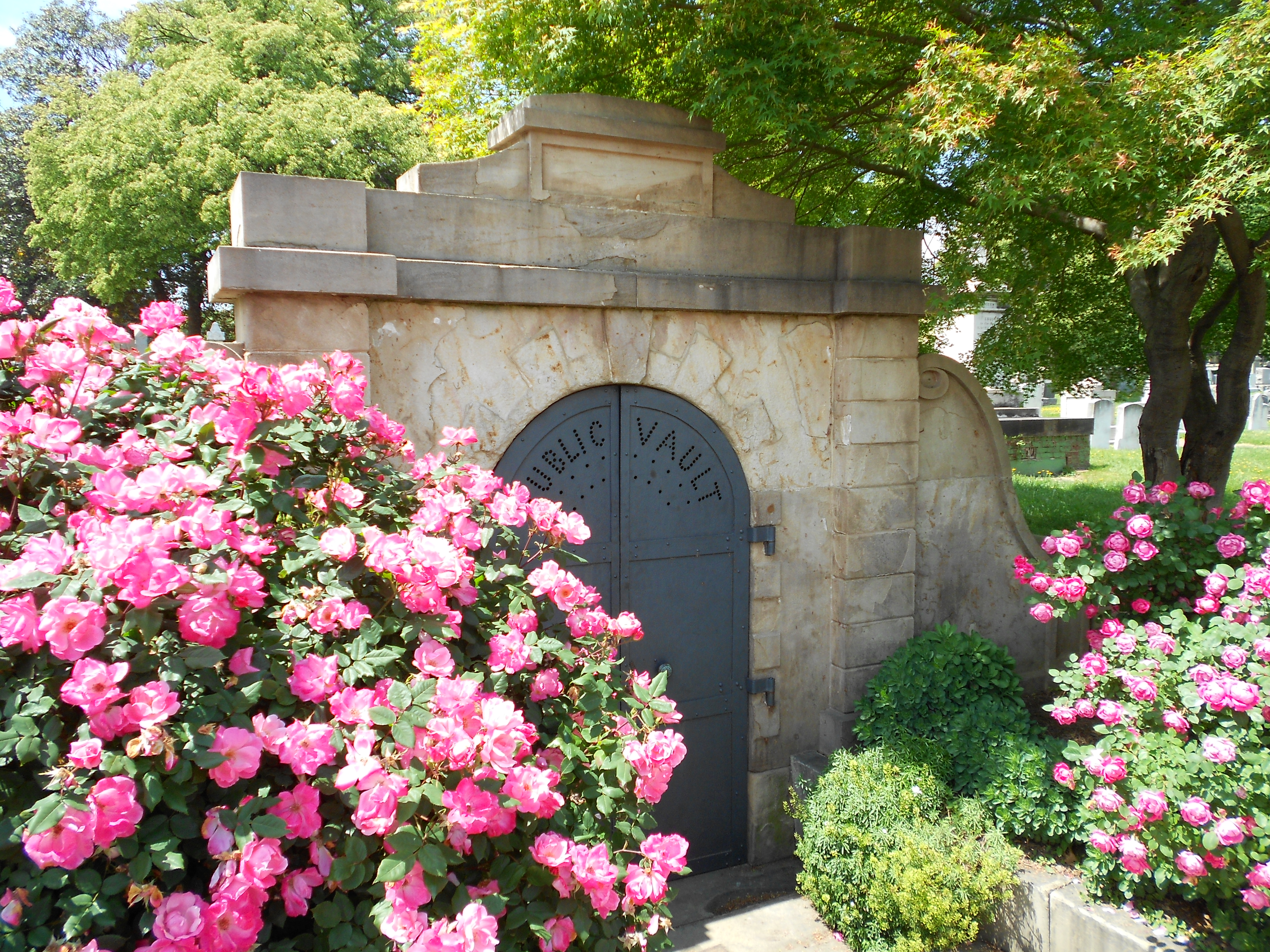
- Interactive map of Public Vault
- Location: SE Washington, D.C., U.S.
- Built: 1832–34
- Architectural style: Classical revival
- Part of: Congressional Cemetery (ID69000292)
- Designated CP: NHL

The Public Vault at the Congressional Cemetery in Washington, D.C. is an early classical revival structure built 1832–1834 with funds appropriated by the United States Congress to store the bodies of government officials and members of the public before burial. About 4,600 individuals were temporarily interred in the vault, including three U.S. presidents, First Lady Dolley Madison, and sixteen congressmen who died while serving in office.

As a contributing structure to the cemetery, the vault was listed on the National Register of Historic Places on June 23, 1969, and a National Historic Landmark in 2011.

== Construction ==
Congress approved an expenditure of $1,000 on July 14, 1832, to build "a substantial brick or stone vault in the Washington Parish Burial Ground, for the temporary interment of members of Congress". Additional appropriations of $1,600 on March 2, 1833, and $194 on June 30, 1834, were approved to complete the vault. These two bills included the name "Public Vault" and allowed the use by members of the public. Use by the government was permitted without further payment, and members of the public were to be charged $5.00 per temporary use. The sexton of Christ Church was to be given $1.50 of this sum for his services, with the remainder given to the vestry of Christ Church, which owns the burial ground, "to be expended in the improvement of the grounds and in keeping the same in order".

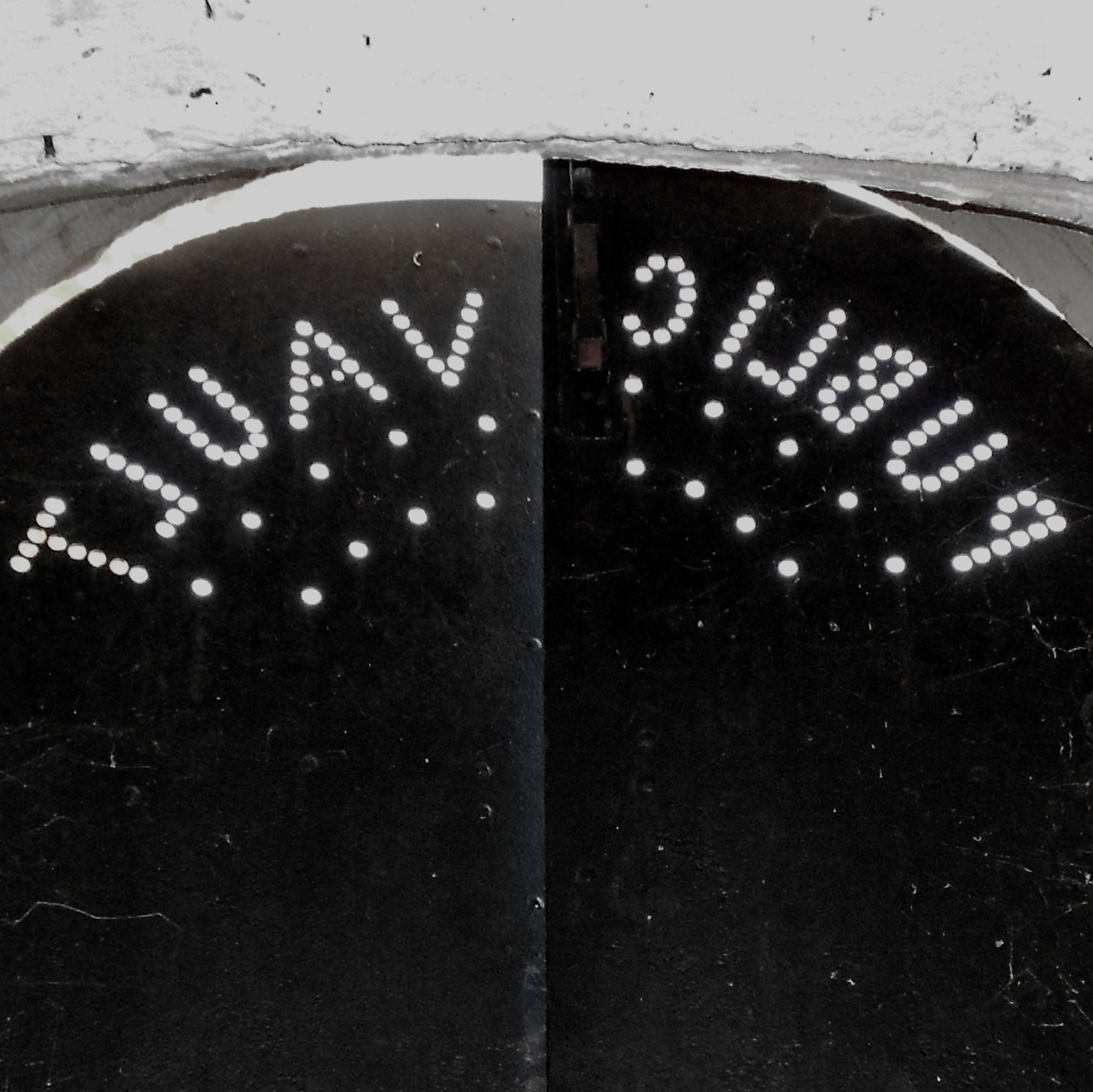
Vent holes from the interior

A classical marble facade with baroque scrolls decorates the partially subterranean vault. Double wrought iron doors have the words "PUBLIC VAULT" displayed through vent holes. The vault is constructed of Aquia Creek sandstone, which was also used to construct many important early structures in Washington, including the White House, the Capitol, and the Latrobe cenotaphs in the cemetery. The vault does not have any niches or shelves to hold coffins; the coffins were placed on the floor and stacked if necessary.

== History ==
Temporary interments have included three U.S. presidents: John Quincy Adams (February 26 – March 6, 1848), William Henry Harrison (April 7 – June 26, 1841), and Zachary Taylor (July 13 – October 26, 1850). President Harrison's body was kept in the vault almost three months, which was more than twice as long as the time he spent as president.

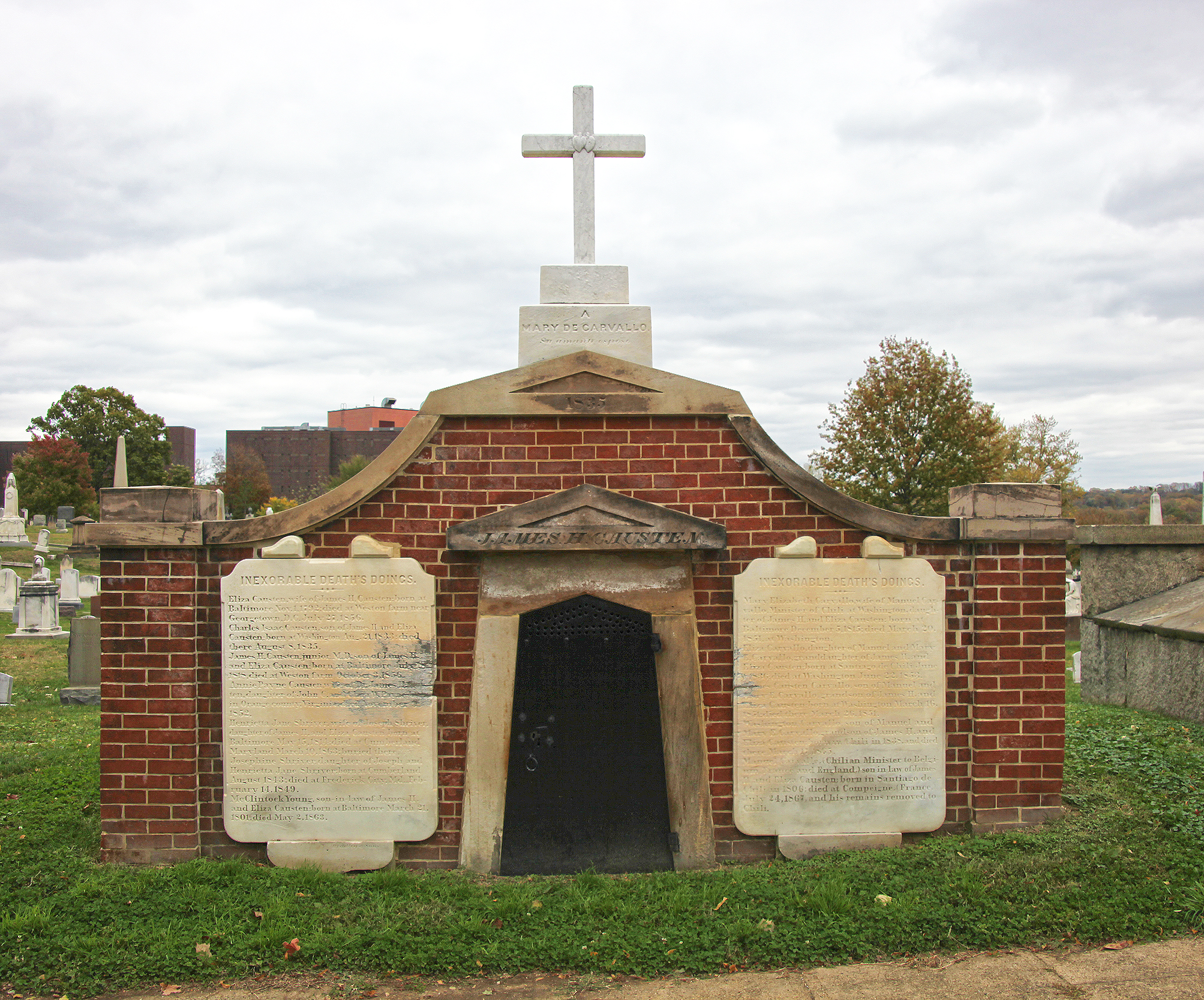
The Causten family vault, built 1835

Dolley Madison was interred in the Public Vault from July 16, 1849, to February 10, 1852, the longest known interment in the vault, while funds were being raised for her re-interment at Montpelier. Her body was transferred to the Causten family vault, directly to the west of the Public Vault, for another six years before the funds were raised. She was briefly joined in May 1852 in the Causten Vault by First Lady Louisa Catherine Adams, though it has been reported that Adams was interred in the Public Vault.

External videos
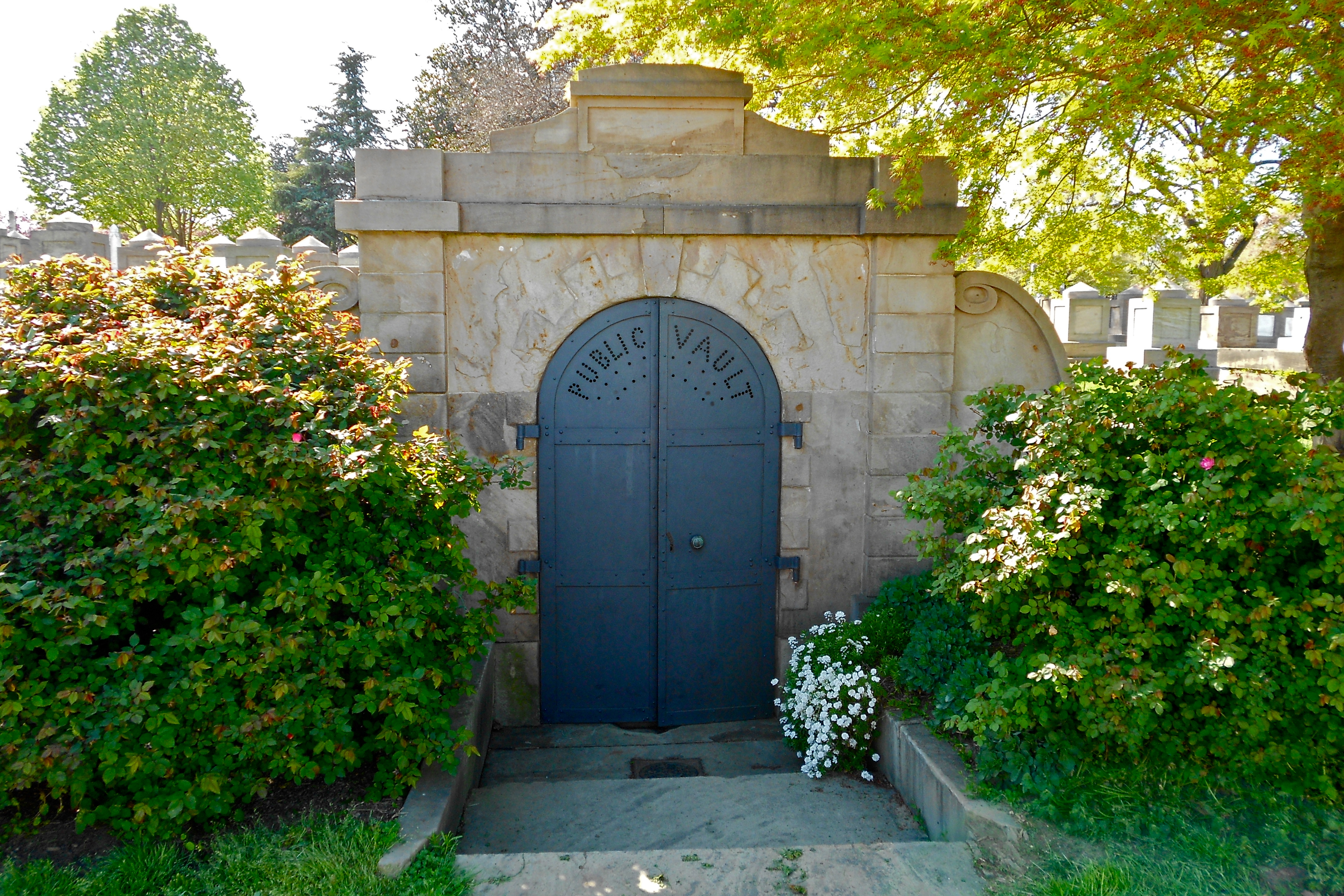
- American Artifacts: Congressional Cemetery, Public Vault & Dolley Madison, C-SPAN

Senator John C. Calhoun was interred in the Public Vault following a formal funeral and grand procession from the Capitol on April 2, 1850. He was encased in an early version of the Fisk metallic coffin, which slowed down decomposition. On April 22, his remains departed the vault for a trip by steamship to Charleston, South Carolina. While the development of transportation and mortuary technology increased the use of the vault, it also limited its use. For example, following Henry Clay's death in 1852, his remains were also encased in a Fisk metallic coffin and transported to his home state by railroad without an interval at the Public Vault.

On February 29, 1844, following an explosion on the USS Princeton, Secretary of State Abel P. Upshur, Secretary of the Navy Thomas Walker Gilmer, Commodore Beverly Kennon, and President John Tyler's prospective father-in-law, David Gardiner, were temporarily interred at the vault.

Several grand public or state funeral processions ended in front of the Public Vault, starting at the White House or the Capitol and then moving down Pennsylvania Avenue and E Street SE to the cemetery. These included the funerals for Presidents Harrison, J. Q. Adams, and Taylor; Senator Calhoun; First Ladies Dolley Madison and Louisa Adams; the victims of the USS Princeton disaster; and several other congressmen. Some of these processions were two miles long, led by military bands and troops for the funerals of military men, members of both houses of Congress and the administration, and pallbearers carefully chosen for political balance to symbolize unity and stability in government.

John Quincy Adams rode in a carriage in the funeral procession for President Harrison. He wrote in his diary, "The corpse was deposited in the receiving vault - with some difficulty from the excessive crowd, but not the slightest disorder."

South Carolina Congressman Preston Smith Brooks lay in the Public Vault in January 1857, within a year of brutally beating Senator Charles Sumner with a cane on the floor of the Senate, an attack that is viewed as an omen of the Civil War.

Legend says that Lewis Powell spent a night in the vault while avoiding pursuit for his role in the assassination of President Lincoln.

While the Public Vault was an important, if semi-official, national memorial during its first few decades, it was used less and less during the second half of the nineteenth century, and much of the twentieth century was unused. During the twentieth century, it became unclear whether the U.S. Government or Christ Church owned the Public Vault and several dozen burial lots. In 1953, a Congressional report suggested that the government clear the record by selling the otherwise unnamed "receiving vault" and the burial lots to the church for $100. As late as 2003, the vault was "empty and decaying." It has since been restored with funds provided by the federal government. During a c. 2010 Prohibition-based fundraiser, it was used as a cocktail bar.

== Sources ==
Media related to Public Vault (Congressional Cemetery) at Wikimedia Commons

- Johnson, Abby A.; Ronald M. Johnson (2012). In the Shadow of the United States Capitol: Congressional Cemetery and the Memory of the Nation. New Academia Publishing. p. 434. ISBN 9780986021626.
- Sienkewicz, Julia A. (2009). "Congressional Cemetery National Historic Landmark Nomination" (PDF). National Park Service. Archived from the original (PDF) on August 30, 2010.
