= Dandridge Featherston Hering =

LGBT activist

Dandridge Hering
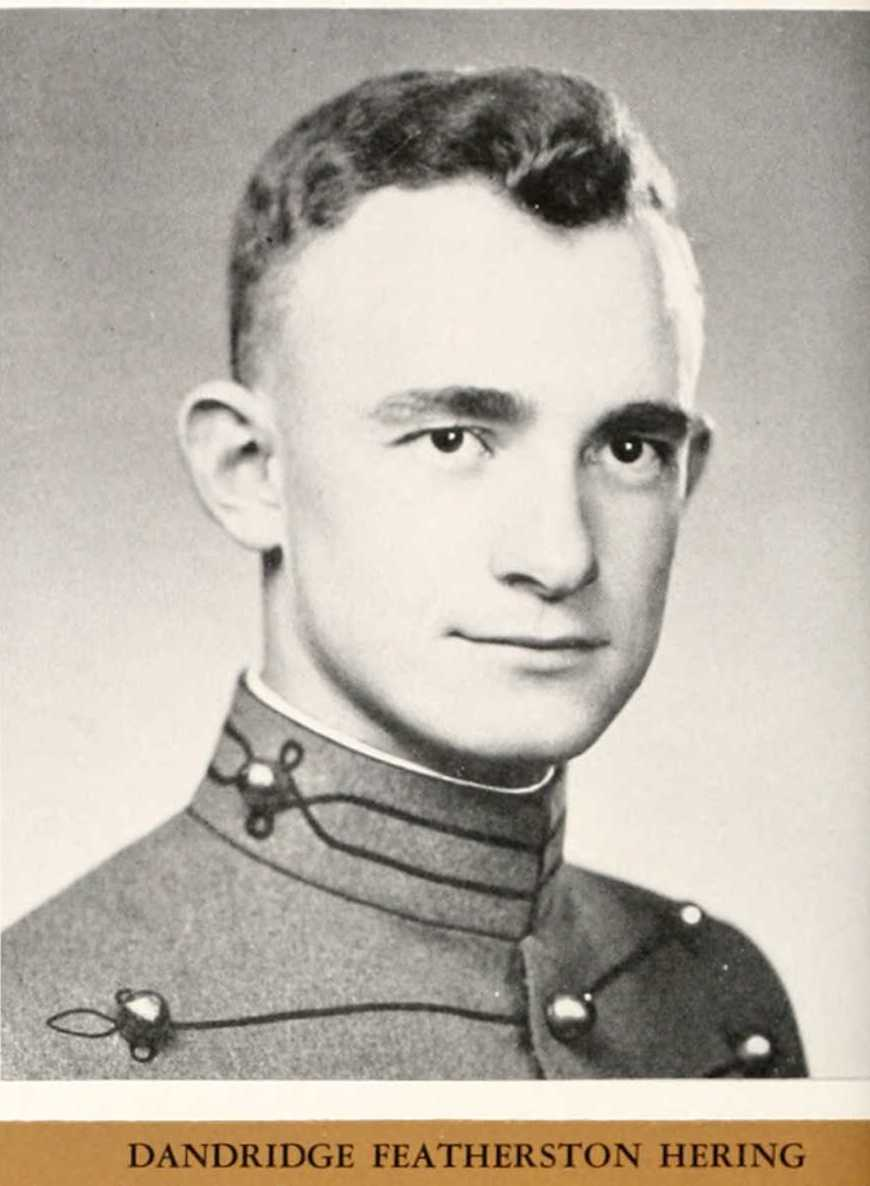
- Hering in the 1940s
- Born: July 24, 1925; Elizabeth River, Virginia, U.S
- Died: March 30, 2012 (aged 86)
- Occupation: Activist
- Partner(s): Joel Paul Leenaars (?–2012 (his death))

Dandridge Featherston Hering (July 24, 1925 – March 30, 2012) was a gay activist mainly involved in supporting the rights of LGBT people serving in the U.S. military.

== Early life ==
Dandridge Featherston Hering was born in Elizabeth River (Virginia), on July 24, 1925, the son of Earl Lee Hering (1888-1965) and Elizabeth Lucille Featherston (1892-1983).

In 1947 Hering graduated from the United States Military Academy, also known as West Point. In 1949 he graduated from the Randolph-Macon College.

== Career ==
Dan Hering served in the US Army for 20 years. In 1953 he was made Captain.

== Personal life ==
Dan Hering and his partner, Joel Paul Leenaars (born April 28, 1935), lived in San Francisco. They were among the first members of the Society for Individual Rights (SIR), one of the earliest gay rights group founded in 1964. They were also founding members of San Francisco's Barbary Coast Boating Club, the first known gay boat club.

Hering was a member of the Service Academy Gay & Lesbian Alumni (SAGLA) and Knights Out, the association grouping the gay West Point graduates.

Leenaars is also one of the most important private collectors of the works of H. C. Westermann, from the time the two of them shared an apartment in Chicago, while Westermann was a student at the Chicago Institute and Leenaars at Albion College.

Hering and his partner retired to Florida, and Hering died on March 30, 2012, in Naples, Florida. He is buried at Congressional Cemetery, Washington, D.C. His tombstone reads: Dandridge Featherston Hering, 1925~2012 USMA 1947, Gentleman - Warrior - Equestrian, Yachtsman - Bibliophile, Together 44 Years, Joel Leenaars, 1935-, Scholar.
