= Henry Ashley (American politician) =

American politician

Member of the U.S. House of Representatives from New York's 11th district
- In office March 4, 1825 – March 3, 1827
- Preceded by: Charles A. Foote
- Succeeded by: Selah R. Hobbie

Personal details
- Born: February 19, 1778 Winchester, Cheshire County, New Hampshire
- Died: January 14, 1829 (aged 50) Catskill, Greene County, New York
- Citizenship: United States
- Party: Jacksonian
- Spouse: Susan Haight Van Voorhis Ashley
- Children: Henry Ashley; George Ashley; Clarence Ashley; Charles Ashley (April 26, 1826, d. November 27, 1826); Charles Ashley
- Profession: tanner; politician

Henry Ashley (February 19, 1778 – January 14, 1829) was an American politician and a U.S. representative from New York from 1825 to 1827.

== Biography ==
Ashley was born the son of David Ashley in Winchester, Cheshire County, New Hampshire. He attended the common schools on December 14, 1817, at Catskill, Greene County, New York. Henry's estate was proved on January 29, 1829, at Catskill, Greene County, New York. They had five children, Henry, George, Clarence, Charles (April 26, 1826 – November 27, 1826), and Charles (born December 19, 1827).

== Career ==
Serving as Town Clerk of Winchester in 1811, Ashley was also a Justice of the Peace in 1817. Afterwards he moved to Catskill and married Susan Haight Van Voorhis there on December 14, 1817. They had five children. He was Chairman of the Catskill Tanners' Association in 1825.

=== Congress ===
Elected as a Jacksonian to the 19th United States Congress, Ashley was Representative for the eleventh district of New York from March 4, 1825, to March 3, 1827.

=== Later career ===
Afterwards he resumed his tanning business, and was President of the Board of Trustees of the Village of Catskill from 1828 until his death.

== Death ==
Ashley died in Catskill, Greene County, New York, on January 14, 1829 (age 50 years, 330 days). He was interred at the Catskill Village Cemetery on Thomson Street.

U.S. House of Representatives
Preceded by Charles A. Foote	Member of the U.S. House of Representatives from New York's 11th congressional district 1825–1827	Succeeded by Selah R. Hobbie
