= Mary Ann Hall =

American brothel owner

Coordinates: 38.8882°N 77.0158°W

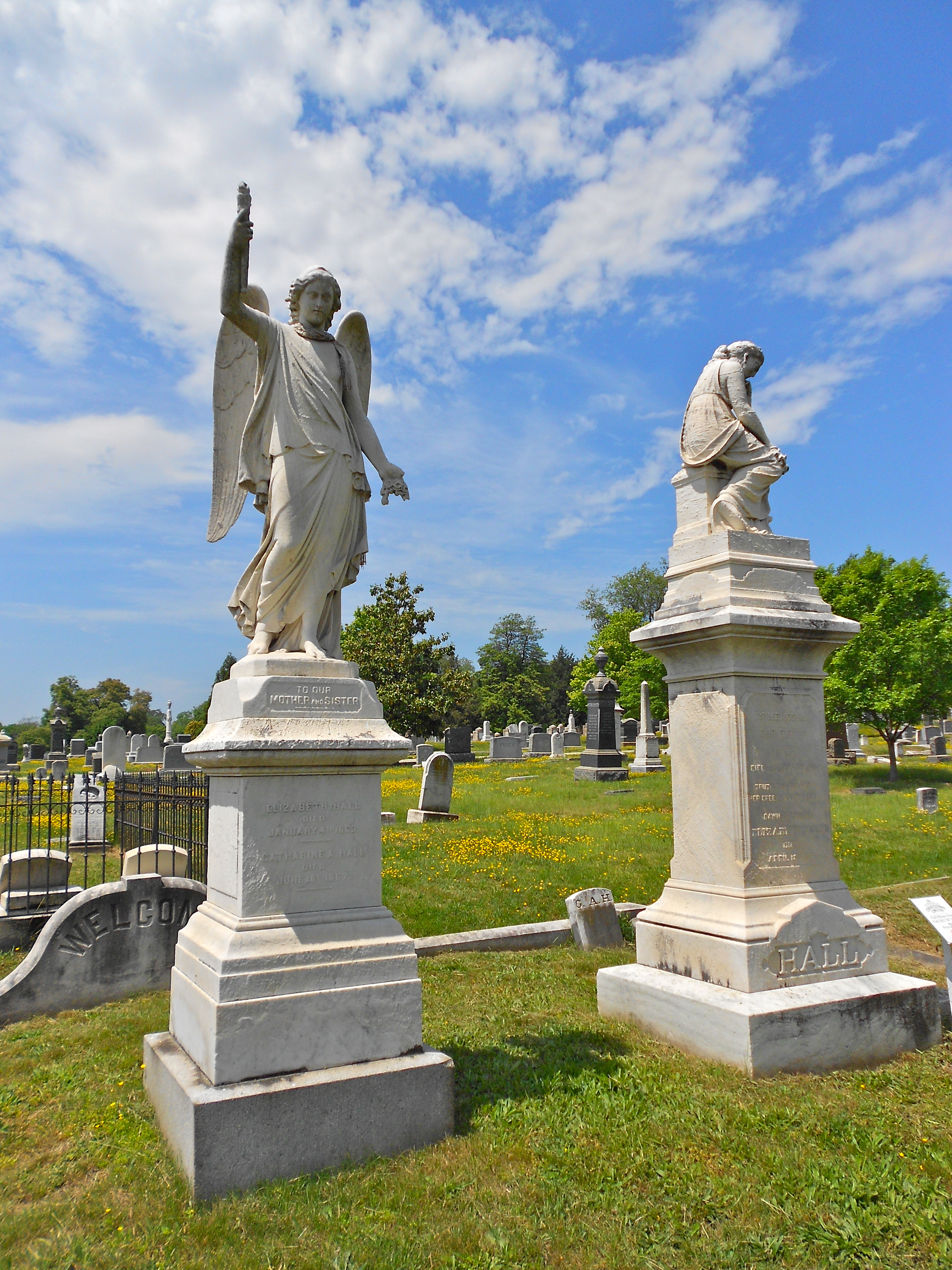
The graves of Hall and her family at Congressional Cemetery in Washington, D.C.

Mary Ann Hall (1814 or 1815 – January 29, 1886) ran a successful brothel from the 1840s until about 1878 at 349 Maryland Avenue S.W., Washington, D.C., about four blocks west of the United States Capitol.

== Washington, D.C. brothel ==
She built a three-story house on the site, which rose greatly in value. In 1864, the Union Army's Provost Marshal published a list of brothels in Washington, D.C., and Mary Ann Hall's had 18 "inmates", making it the largest in the city.

Before the National Museum of the American Indian was built on the site in 1999, the Smithsonian Institution conducted an archeological excavation of the foundations and garbage dump of the house. The expensive tableware in the garbage dump was made of ironstone and porcelain. Food remnants include meat, fowl, fish, and exotic fruits, including coconuts and berries. French champagne corks were especially numerous.

== Death ==
Hall died on January 29, 1886, with a net worth of $87,000, worth over $2,000,000 in 2005 dollars. She was interred with her sister and other family members under "large and dignified" memorials at the Congressional Cemetery in Washington, D.C.

== Legacy ==
Her summer home in Arlington County, Virginia, was later owned by Presley Marion Rixey and is now Marymount University.
