= Perkins King =

American politician

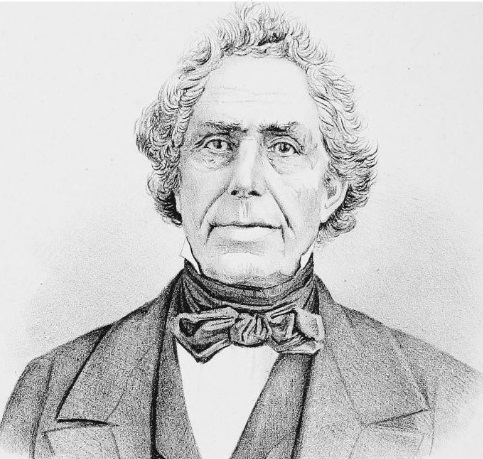
- From 1884's History of Greene County, New York

Member of the United States House of Representatives
- In office March 4, 1829 – March 3, 1831
- Preceded by: Selah R. Hobbie
- Succeeded by: Erastus Root
- Constituency: New York's 11th congressional district

First Judge of the Greene County, New York Court
- In office 1838–1847
- Preceded by: Dorrance Kirtland
- Succeeded by: Lyman Tremain

Member of the New York State Assembly
- In office January 1, 1827 – January 31, 1827 Serving with William Tuttle
- Preceded by: Addison Porter, Williams Seaman
- Succeeded by: Elisha Bishop, William Faulkner Jr.
- Constituency: Greene County

Personal details
- Born: Perkins King; January 12, 1784 New Marlborough, Massachusetts, U.S.
- Died: November 29, 1875 (aged 91) Freehold, New York, U.S.
- Resting place: Snyder Cemetery, Freehold, New York, U.S.
- Party: Democratic-Republican; Jacksonian; Democratic
- Spouse(s): Polly Jackson (m. 1812); Althea Barnes (m. 1852)
- Children: 7
- Profession: Attorney

Perkins King (January 12, 1784 – November 29, 1875) was an American lawyer, businessman, and politician from New York. Active in politics as a Democratic-Republican, Jacksonian, and Democrat, he served one term as a United States representative from 1829 to 1831.

== Biography ==
King was born in New Marlborough, Massachusetts on January 12, 1784, a son of Amos King and Lucy (Perkins) King. He was educated in New Marlborough, and moved to Greenville, New York in 1802.

=== Business career ===
After moving to New York, King studied law, and was admitted to the bar. He also became involved in business ventures, including a woolen mill.

== Political career ==
Active in politics as a Democratic-Republican, Jacksonian, and Democrat, he served as Greenville's town clerk in 1815, and was town supervisor from 1817 to 1820. He was a justice of the peace from 1818 to 1822. He was appointed a judge of the Greene County Court in 1823 and served until becoming First Judge in 1838. He was a member of the New York State Assembly (Greene Co.) in 1827.

=== Congress ===
King was elected as a Jacksonian to the Twenty-first Congress (March 4, 1829 – March 3, 1831). He did not run for reelection in 1830.

== Later career and death ==
He served as First Judge of the Greene County Court from 1838 to 1847.

King died in Freehold, New York, November 29, 1875. He was interred in Freehold's Snyder Cemetery.

== Family ==
In 1812, King married Polly Jackson, who died in 1849. In 1852 he married Althea Barnes, who died in 1867. With his first wife, King was the father of seven children.

U.S. House of Representatives
Preceded by Selah R. Hobbie	Member of the U.S. House of Representatives from New York's 11th congressional district 1829–1831	Succeeded by Erastus Root
