= Charles A. Foote =

American politician

Member of the U.S. House of Representatives from New York's 11th district
- In office March 4, 1823 – March 3, 1825
- Preceded by: John W. Taylor
- Succeeded by: Henry Ashley

Personal details
- Born: April 15, 1785 Newburgh, New York, US
- Died: August 1, 1828 (aged 43) Delhi, New York, US
- Party: Crawford
- Spouse: Margaret (Maria) Baldwin
- Profession: Lawyer

Charles Augustus Foote (April 15, 1785 – August 1, 1828) was a United States representative from New York.

== Biography ==
Foote was born in Newburgh, New York. He attended private schools in Newburgh and Kingston, New York, and graduated from Union College, Schenectady, New York, in 1805. He studied law, was admitted to the bar in 1808 and practiced in New York City and later in Delhi, New York. He served as colonel in the New York State Militia, Sixth Division. He became Trustee of Delaware Academy and served as president of the village of Delhi.

Foote was elected as a Crawford Democratic-Republican to the 18th United States Congress, serving from March 4, 1823 to March 3, 1825. He resumed the practice of law in Delhi, New York, where he died.

== Family ==
Charles A. Foote married 10 May 1808, Maria Baldwin, daughter of Jesse Baldwin and Margaretta de Hart of New York City, or Newark, New Jersey. Their children were, probably, born at Delhi, New York:

- Frances Foote, b. 1 August 1809; d. 27 July 1891; she m. 15 October 1832 Charles Marvin, son of Anthony Marvin and Abigail Paine [Marv. Fam.;378, Foote Hist;204-5]. They had: Margaret Maxwell Marvin, married to Isaac H. Maynard.
- Catherine Bruen Foote, b. 14 September 1811; died November, 1897; “Never married but spent her time and money on good works.”
- Harriet Baldwin Foote b. 21 January 1814; she d. at [Delhi?] 26 September 1814.
- Rensselaer William Foote, b. 12 November 1815; died June 26, 1862 “Capt. in 6th Infantry U. S. Army, Brevet Major and Acting Col. in the first battle in which he took part, and in which he was killed, Gaines' Mill. Was stationed in Arizona when war broke out."
- Charles Augustus Foote, b. 18 March 1818; died 28 February 1896 at Delhi; Inheriting good competence while still a child, he erected a building during his minority, and for over 60 years conducted there a mercantile and manufacturing business, meanwhile busied with numberless outside interests. Held most of the town offices, was county treasurer for three successive terms. One of the organizers and chief pillar of his church, like his father and grandfather, Trustee of Delaware Academy, Director of the Bank, Commissioner of Railroad, and for a few years in business in California where his building was twice swept away, first by the great flood, then by fire. Always gentle and courteous, the village papers said of him at his death, “The last gentleman of the old school in our midst has passed away.” married 11 September 1844 Adelia Johnson; children
  - Katherine Adelia Foote, b. 27 September 1845, Active in local affairs, and with a large social acquaintance outside Delhi. Member of D. A. R. and County Regent for a number of years. Secretary of State Charities Aid for 25 years. Secretary for Columbia Exposition, etc. She was an editor of a book on her gr. grandfather, Ebenezer Foote, she lived Delhi, visited Manhattan every season for Grand Opera during which time she would stay in a hotel just around the corner from the old Opera House.
  - Charles Augustus, 3rd, b. February 1862, d. February 1862.
- James Buren Foote, b. 16 April 1821; died 13 May 1910.

== Citations ==
- United States Congress. "Charles A. Foote (id: F000249)". Biographical Directory of the United States Congress.
- History of Delaware County, N.Y., With Illustrations, Biographical Sketches and Portraits of Some Pioneers and Prominent Residents. N.Y.C.: W. H. Munsell & Co. 1880.
- Foote, Abram W. (1907), The Foote Family, Comprising The Genealogy and History of Nathaniel Foote Of Weathersfield, Conn. And His Descendants..., Rutland

U.S. House of Representatives
Preceded by John W. Taylor	Member of the U.S. House of Representatives from New York's 11th congressional district 1823–1825	Succeeded by Henry Ashley
