= Rensselaer William Foote =

Rensselaer William Foote (November 12, 1815 – June 26, 1862) was an American Army officer, a "Regular" from New York who served in the Seminole Wars in Florida, against the Sioux in the West, in Arizona and California and in the Civil War on the Virginia Peninsular Campaign.

Foote was born (prob.) at Delhi, New York to Charles Augustus Foote (U.S. House of Representatives from Delhi) and Maria DeHart Baldwin, the daughter of importing merchants in Manhattan.

== Civil War ==
After a 24-year career of military service he died at Gaines' Mill, Virginia where he was buried on the field. There is a memorial marker in his family lot, Woodlawn Cemetery, Delhi New York.

== Uniform and Journal ==
Foote was an officer in the U.S. 6th Infantry, "Regulars" in the Seminole wars in 1841. After a term of service that included duty in Oklahoma, Arkansas and New Mexico territory, he died at the battle of Gaine's Mill. It was the first battle he participated in during the Civil War.

His letters, Journal kept in 1839–1842 mainly in Florida, and the hats and empaulets of Col. Foote are in the Collection of The Main Street Museum White River Jct. Vermont.

== Excerpts from the Journal ==
Pelatka, Fla. Dec 25, 1840... The day I left N York I had the blues horridly—at the idea of leaving so much comfort, but my duty required it. My two particular friends (Tyler & Fields,) went over to Governor's Island, with me to see me off, but I returned to the City <with them>, and took leave of them in Wall street. We had some agreeable ladies on board ship, and spent our time pleasantly. Mrs. Merrill, with her husband, who board at the Astor House, going to the South for his health, made us drink, champagne every day for sea sickness—a very agreeable medicine, truly...

Jan 12, 1841...Some Indians with their squaws are in camp this morning. They visit us most everyday—they are encamped a few miles from us. Uncle is holding another truce with them, in the vain hope that they will all come in, and they are very well satisfied to eat our provisions in the winter, and murder us in the summer. I would give a months ^pay^ to see them all hanging to some of the pine trees around us... [saw] three of the rascals, one of them appeared to be a negro...

...Adjutant gave me notice immediately after inspection that there would be a parade. I formed "F." Compy on the right in line of battle, and was not aware of the object of the parade, until I saw the prisoner in front who was to receive 50 lashes for desertion, with <clo?> some other punishment. After the proceedings and approval of the Court Martial were read, the prisoner was tied to three muskets stacked, and received the 50 lashes on his bare back, inflicted with a small rattan by the Chief Musician. He twisted and yelled a good deal, but I think he got off cheap. This was the first flogging I ever saw —

Friday, January 12.—Yesterday Col. L arrived here from Fort Clinch with some women and children and a few women's on their way to Tampa...

February 3d—Nothing wonderful happened to day—nothing to stir up the dull blood, or drive off ennui.—The Sun rose as usual, and has set behind the everlasting pine trees,—and the Moon is now shedding its soft and gentle rays upon us, occasionally obscured by some passing cloud which impudently thrust itself before her face. [p. 10]

...Occasionally the notes of a flute come wafted to our ears from the quarter of the soldiers mingled with the song and merry laughter of ^many a^ reckless son of Mars. Here is a group of them squatted round <a.> one who seems to be engrossing their attention with tales of hobgoblins, witches, ghosts, and wonderful scenes in which he himself has acted no mean part—he is eloquent, as you may see by their silent attention only interrupted at intervals by an exclamation of surprise or wonder. A little farther on another group may be seen whom frequent shouts and peals of laughter, are evidently occasioned by some witty jest, or stage buffoonery of the oracle of their little circle. The soldier is the same the world over, as soon as enlists he throws dull care away, and becomes a reckless, thoughtless, light hearted being—thinking of nothing but the p[r]esent, and regardless of the future.

== Citations ==
Clark, John D., Congressman Thirty-fourth District, 1921–1925 (1925). Arbor Hill, 1797–1925, with pl. Reprinted from an article by Floyd H. Lincoln and published in "The Walton Reporter," June 6, 1925.

"Charles Augustus Foote". Biographical Directory of the United States Congress, 1744–1989. Vol. Bicentennial Edition. U S Government Printing Office. 1989.

Purdy, Dorman S. (n.d.). Descendants of Francis Purdy. New York Genealogical and Biographical Society.

Margaret Maxwell Marvin [Maynard], through Frances Maynard [Ford] pp., copies of Bible of other records of births and marriages. Collection Main Street Museum.

Katherine Adelia Foote, Ebenezer Foote, the Founder; Being an Epistolary Light on His Time as Shed by Letters From His Files; Selected by his Great Granddaughter... Delhi, 1927.

Foote Family Record, embroidered sampler showing the children of C. A. Foote, and Foote Family Bible Record, ms. The Main Street Museum, White River Junction, Vermont.

History of Delaware County, N.Y., With Illustrations, Biographical Sketches and Portraits of Some Pioneers and Prominent Residents. N.Y.C.: W. H. Munsell & Co. 1880.

Foote, Abram W. (1907). The Foote Family, Comprising The Genealogy and History of Nathaniel Foote Of Weathersfield, Conn. And His Descendants... Rutland, VT: Tuttle.
