= 67th New York State Legislature =

New York state legislative session

| ← | 66th | 68th | → |
- The Old State Capitol (1879)

Overview
- Legislative body: New York State Legislature
- Jurisdiction: New York, United States
- Term: January 1 – December 31, 1844

Senate
- Members: 32
- President: Lt. Gov. Daniel S. Dickinson (D)
- Temporary President: Henry A. Foster (D), from February 8
- Party control: Democratic (26-6)

Assembly
- Members: 128
- Speaker: Elisha Litchfield (D)
- Party control: Democratic (92-36)

Sessions
- 1st: January 2 – May 7, 1844

The 67th New York State Legislature, consisting of the New York State Senate and the New York State Assembly, met from January 2 to May 7, 1844, during the second year of William C. Bouck's governorship, in Albany.

== Background ==
Under the provisions of the New York Constitution of 1821, 32 senators were elected on general tickets in eight senatorial districts for four-year terms. They were divided into four classes, and every year eight senate seats came up for election. Assemblymen were elected countywide on general tickets to a one-year term, the whole assembly being renewed annually.

State Senator William Ruger died on May 21, 1843, leaving a vacancy in the Fifth District.

At this time there were two major political parties: the Democratic Party and the Whig Party. About this time began the split of the Democratic Party into Barnburners and Hunkers. The radical abolitionists appeared as the Liberty Party. In New York City the American Republican Party nominated a full ticket

== Elections ==
The state election was held on November 7, 1843.

State Senator Morris Franklin (1st D.) was defeated for re-election.

1843 New York State Senate election result
| District | Democrat | | Whig | | Liberty | | American Republican | |
|---|---|---|---|---|---|---|---|---|
| First | David R. Floyd-Jones | 18,422 | Morris Franklin | 18,052 | Fan. | 119 | Mangle M. Quackenbos | 8,712 |
| Second | Joshua B. Smith | 22,296 | Wells | 17,443 | | 65 | | |
| Third | Stephen C. Johnson | 24,479 | More | 21,608 | | 710 | | |
| Fourth | Orville Clark | 25,242 | George A. Simmons | 20,345 | Campbell | 2,093 | | |
| Fifth | Thomas Barlow | 23,701 | Clark | 17,405 | Delong | 5,042 | | |
| Fifth | George C. Sherman | | | | | | | |
| Sixth | Clark Burnham | 23,609 | Henry S. Walbridge | 20,611 | | 1,824 | | |
| Seventh | Albert Lester | 21,733 | Maynard | 19,271 | Bradley | 3,055 | | |
| Eighth | Murphy | 18,928 | Frederick F. Backus | 22,143 | Plumb | 2,661 | | |

== Sessions ==
On January 1, the Democratic assemblymen met in caucus and nominated Elisha Litchfield (Hunker) for Speaker with 56 votes against 35 for Michael Hoffman (Barnburner).

The legislature met for the regular session at the Old State Capitol in Albany on January 2, 1844; and adjourned on May 7.

Elisha Litchfield (D) was elected Speaker with 90 votes against 28 for Samuel Stevens (W). James R. Rose (D) was elected Clerk of the Assembly with 89 votes against 33 for George W. Weed (W).

On February 5, the legislature re-elected State Treasurer Thomas Farrington (D).

On February 8, Henry A. Foster was elected president pro tempore of the Senate.

On May 6, the legislature enacted to reduce the number of canal commissioners from 6 to 4, and that the canal commissioners be elected statewide by popular ballot. This was the first time, since Independence, that any other office than governor and lieutenant governor was to be filled by a statewide popular election.

On June 17, U.S. Senator Nathaniel P. Tallmadge (W) resigned his seat, and was appointed as Governor of the Wisconsin Territory.

The Democratic state convention met on September 4 at Syracuse, Heman J. Redfield (Hunker) was chairman. They nominated U.S. Senator Silas Wright, Jr. for governor, Addison Gardiner for lieutenant governor; and an electoral ticket pledged to James K. Polk.

The Whig state convention met on September 11 at Syracuse, Francis Granger was chairman. They nominated Millard Fillmore for governor; Samuel J. Wilkin for lieutenant governor; and an electoral ticket pledged to Henry Clay.

U.S. Senator Silas Wright, Jr. (D) was elected Governor of New York, and resigned his seat in November 1844. On November 30, Gov. Bouck appointed Lt. Gov. Daniel S. Dickinson (D) and State Senator Henry A. Foster (D) to fill the two vacancies temporarily.

== State Senate ==
=== Districts ===
- The First District (4 seats) consisted of Kings, New York and Richmond counties.
- The Second District (4 seats) consisted of Dutchess, Orange, Putnam, Queens, Rockland, Suffolk, Sullivan, Ulster and Westchester counties.
- The Third District (4 seats) consisted of Albany, Columbia, Delaware, Greene, Rensselaer, Schenectady and Schoharie counties.
- The Fourth District (4 seats) consisted of Clinton, Essex, Franklin, Fulton, Hamilton, Herkimer, Montgomery, St. Lawrence, Saratoga, Warren and Washington counties.
- The Fifth District (4 seats) consisted of Jefferson, Lewis, Madison, Oneida, Oswego and Otsego counties.
- The Sixth District (4 seats) consisted of Allegany, Broome, Cattaraugus, Chemung, Chenango, Livingston, Steuben, Tioga and Tompkins counties.
- The Seventh District (4 seats) consisted of Cayuga, Cortland, Onondaga, Ontario, Seneca, Wayne and Yates counties.
- The Eighth District (4 seats) consisted of Chautauqua, Erie, Genesee, Monroe, Niagara, Orleans and Wyoming counties.
Note: There are now 62 counties in the State of New York. The counties which are not mentioned in this list had not yet been established, or sufficiently organized, the area being included in one or more of the abovementioned counties.

=== Members ===
The asterisk (*) denotes members of the previous legislature who continued in office as members of this legislature. David R. Floyd-Jones and Joshua B. Smith changed from the Assembly to the Senate.

| District | Senators | Term left | Party | Notes |
|---|---|---|---|---|
| First | John B. Scott* | 1 year | Democrat/Barnburner | |
| First | Isaac L. Varian* | 2 years | Democrat | |
| First | John A. Lott* | 3 years | Democrat/Hunker | |
| First | David R. Floyd-Jones* | 4 years | Democrat/Hunker | |
| Second | Robert Denniston* | 1 year | Democrat | |
| Second | Abraham Bockee* | 2 years | Democrat/Hunker | |
| Second | Abraham A. Deyo* | 3 years | Democrat | |
| Second | Joshua B. Smith* | 4 years | Democrat | |
| Third | Henry W. Strong* | 1 year | Democrat | resigned on December 3, 1844 |
| Third | Erastus Corning* | 2 years | Democrat/Hunker | |
| Third | John C. Wright* | 3 years | Democrat | |
| Third | Stephen C. Johnson | 4 years | Democrat | |
| Fourth | Sidney Lawrence* | 1 year | Democrat | |
| Fourth | Edmund Varney* | 2 years | Democrat | |
| Fourth | Thomas B. Mitchell* | 3 years | Democrat/Hunker | |
| Fourth | Orville Clark | 4 years | Democrat/Hunker | |
| Fifth | Henry A. Foster* | 1 year | Democrat/Hunker | on November 30, 1844, appointed a U.S. Senator from New York |
| Fifth | George C. Sherman | 2 years | Democrat/Barnburner | elected to fill vacancy, in place of William Ruger |
| Fifth | Carlos P. Scovil* | 3 years | Democrat | |
| Fifth | Thomas Barlow | 4 years | Democrat/Barnburner | also First Judge of the Madison County Court |
| Sixth | Nehemiah Platt* | 1 year | Whig | |
| Sixth | James Faulkner* | 2 years | Democrat | |
| Sixth | Calvin T. Chamberlain* | 3 years | Democrat | |
| Sixth | Clark Burnham | 4 years | Democrat | |
| Seventh | Elijah Rhoades* | 1 year | Whig | |
| Seventh | William Bartlit* | 2 years | Democrat/Hunker | |
| Seventh | John Porter* | 3 years | Democrat | |
| Seventh | Albert Lester | 4 years | Democrat | |
| Eighth | Samuel Works* | 1 year | Whig | |
| Eighth | Gideon Hard* | 2 years | Whig | |
| Eighth | Harvey Putnam* | 3 years | Whig | |
| Eighth | Frederick F. Backus | 4 years | Whig | |

=== Employees ===
- Clerk: Isaac R. Elwood
- Deputy Clerks: Charles Bryan, Hiram Leonard
- Sergeant-at-Arms: Charles Niven
- Doorkeeper: Joel Gillett
- Assistant Doorkeeper: Martin Miller

== State Assembly ==
=== Districts ===
- Albany County (3 seats)
- Allegany County (2 seats)
- Broome County (1 seat)
- Cattaraugus County (2 seats)
- Cayuga County (3 seats)
- Chautauqua County (3 seats)
- Chemung County (1 seat)
- Chenango County (3 seats)
- Clinton County (1 seat)
- Columbia County (3 seats)
- Cortland County (2 seats)
- Delaware County (2 seats)
- Dutchess County (3 seats)
- Erie County (3 seats)
- Essex County (1 seat)
- Franklin County (1 seat)
- Fulton and Hamilton counties (1 seat)
- Genesee County (2 seats)
- Greene County (2 seats)
- Herkimer County (2 seats)
- Jefferson County (3 seats)
- Kings County (2 seats)
- Lewis County (1 seat)
- Livingston County (2 seats)
- Madison County (3 seats)
- Monroe County (3 seats)
- Montgomery County (2 seats)
- The City and County of New York (13 seats)
- Niagara County (2 seats)
- Oneida County (4 seats)
- Onondaga County (4 seats)
- Ontario County (3 seats)
- Orange County (3 seats)
- Orleans County (1 seat)
- Oswego County (2 seats)
- Otsego County (3 seats)
- Putnam County (1 seat)
- Queens County (1 seat)
- Rensselaer County (3 seats)
- Richmond County (1 seat)
- Rockland County (1 seat)
- St. Lawrence County (2 seats)
- Saratoga County (2 seats)
- Schenectady County (1 seat)
- Schoharie County (2 seats)
- Seneca County (1 seat)
- Steuben County (3 seats)
- Suffolk County (2 seats)
- Sullivan County (1 seat)
- Tioga County (1 seat)
- Tompkins County (2 seats)
- Ulster County (2 seats)
- Warren County (1 seat)
- Washington (2 seats)
- Wayne County (2 seats)
- Westchester County (2 seats)
- Wyoming County (2 seats)
- Yates County (1 seat)
Note: There are now 62 counties in the State of New York. The counties which are not mentioned in this list had not yet been established, or sufficiently organized, the area being included in one or more of the abovementioned counties.

=== Assemblymen ===
The asterisk (*) denotes members of the previous legislature who continued as members of this legislature.

| District | Assemblymen | Party | Notes |
|---|---|---|---|
| Albany | Levi Shaw | | |
| Albany | Samuel Stevens | Whig | previously a member from Washington Co. |
| Albany | Simon Veeder | | |
| Allegany | Nathaniel Coe | Whig | |
| Allegany | Horatio R. Riddle | | |
| Broome | John B. Rogers | | |
| Cattaraugus | James Burt | | |
| Cattaraugus | Marcus H. Johnson | | |
| Cayuga | Ashbel Avery | | |
| Cayuga | Benjamin F. Hall | Whig | |
| Cayuga | Robert Hume | | |
| Chautauqua | Forbes Johnson | | |
| Chautauqua | Marcius Simons | | |
| Chautauqua | Elijah Waters | | |
| Chemung | Sylvester Hazen | | |
| Chenango | Rensselaer W. Clark | Democrat | |
| Chenango | Erastus Dickinson | | |
| Chenango | Daniel Noyes | Democrat | |
| Clinton | Julius C. Hubbell* | Democrat | |
| Columbia | William A. Carpenter | | |
| Columbia | Uriah Edwards | | |
| Columbia | Peter P. Rossman | | |
| Cortland | Platt F. Grow | | |
| Cortland | John Kingman Jr. | | |
| Delaware | Edward I. Burhans | Democrat | |
| Delaware | Jesse Palmer | | |
| Dutchess | Alexander H. Coffin | | |
| Dutchess | John K. Mead | | |
| Dutchess | Ambrose L. Pinney | Democrat | |
| Erie | Daniel Lee | | |
| Erie | Elisha Smith | | |
| Erie | Amos Wright | | |
| Essex | Gideon Hammond | Whig | |
| Franklin | Francis D. Flanders | Democrat | |
| Fulton and Hamilton | James Harris | | |
| Genesee | Charles P. Brown | | |
| Genesee | Chester Hannum | Whig | |
| Greene | Robert C. Field | Democrat | |
| Greene | Lemuel C. Stimson | Democrat | |
| Herkimer | Michael Hoffman | Democrat/Barnburner | |
| Herkimer | Peter H. Warren | | |
| Jefferson | Samuel Bond | | |
| Jefferson | William Carlisle | | |
| Jefferson | Eli West | | |
| Kings | William Burbank | | |
| Kings | Jacob Rapelje | | |
| Lewis | Alburn Foster | | |
| Livingston | Gardner Arnold | | |
| Livingston | Daniel D. Spencer* | Whig | |
| Madison | Ralph I. Gates | | |
| Madison | Thomas Keith | | |
| Madison | Alfred Medbery | | |
| Monroe | Ashley Sampson | Democrat | |
| Monroe | Moses Sperry | | |
| Monroe | Edward Wadhams | | |
| Montgomery | Clark B. Cochrane | Democrat | |
| Montgomery | Morgan L. Harris | | |
| New York | Joseph S. Bosworth | Democrat | |
| New York | Michael Burke | | |
| New York | Thomas N. Carr | | |
| New York | Auguste Davezac | Democrat | |
| New York | Joshua Fleet | | |
| New York | George G. Glasier* | Democrat | |
| New York | William H. Jansen | Democrat | |
| New York | Thomas Jeremiah | | |
| New York | George S. Mann | | |
| New York | John E. Ross | | |
| New York | Edward Sanford* | Democrat | |
| New York | James H. Suydam | | |
| New York | Richard S. Williams | | |
| Niagara | John Sweeney* | Whig | |
| Niagara | Luther Wilson | | |
| Oneida | Justus Childs | | |
| Oneida | James Douglass | | |
| Oneida | Richard Empey | | |
| Oneida | Horatio Seymour | Democrat/Hunker | |
| Onondaga | Warner Abbott | | |
| Onondaga | Thomas G. Alvord | Democrat | |
| Onondaga | Seth Hutchinson | | |
| Onondaga | Elisha Litchfield | Democrat/Hunker | elected Speaker |
| Ontario | Lorenzo Clark | | |
| Ontario | Israel Huntington | Whig | |
| Ontario | Henry Pardee | | |
| Orange | Leonard Lee* | Democrat/Barnburner | |
| Orange | David H. Smith | Democrat | |
| Orange | George W. Tuthill | Democrat | |
| Orleans | Sands Cole | | |
| Oswego | William F. Allen* | Democrat | |
| Oswego | Alban Strong* | Democrat | |
| Otsego | George S. Gorham | Democrat | |
| Otsego | William W. Snow | Democrat | |
| Otsego | Nahum Thompson | | |
| Putnam | Saxton Smith | Democrat | |
| Queens | Samuel Youngs* | Democrat | |
| Rensselaer | John L. Cole | | |
| Rensselaer | George B. Warren | | |
| Rensselaer | Jonathan E. Whipple | | |
| Richmond | William Nickles | | |
| Rockland | John Haring Jr. | | |
| St. Lawrence | Calvin T. Hulburd* | Democrat/Barnburner | |
| St. Lawrence | George Redington* | Democrat | |
| Saratoga | James Groom | | |
| Saratoga | Ezra Wilson | | |
| Schenectady | Archibald L. Linn | Whig | |
| Schoharie | Seth Eldredge | | |
| Schoharie | John Spickerman | | |
| Seneca | Helim Sutton | | |
| Steuben | John Jamison | | |
| Steuben | Asa McConnell | | |
| Steuben | Jeffery Smith | | |
| Suffolk | Silas Horton | | |
| Suffolk | Richard W. Smith | | |
| Sullivan | Amos Y. Grant | | |
| Tioga | Nathaniel W. Davis | | |
| Tompkins | Peter Lounsbury | | |
| Tompkins | Charles M. Turner | | |
| Ulster | Abraham D. Bevier | | |
| Ulster | Samuel Reynolds | | |
| Warren | John F. Sherrill | | |
| Washington | John Barker | | |
| Washington | John W. Proudfit | | |
| Wayne | Austin Roe | | |
| Wayne | Isaac R. Sanford | | |
| Westchester | Andrew Findlay* | Democrat | |
| Westchester | Charles Wright | | |
| Wyoming | Truman Benedict* | Whig | |
| Wyoming | Leverett Spring | Whig | |
| Yates | Thomas Seamans | | |

=== Employees ===
- Clerk: James R. Rose
- Sergeant-at-Arms: Jonathan P. Couch
- Doorkeeper: John P. Davis
- Assistant Doorkeeper: David E. Williams
- Second Assistant Doorkeeper: John Moore

== Sources ==
- The New York Civil List compiled by Franklin Benjamin Hough (Weed, Parsons and Co., 1858) [pg. 109 and 441 for Senate districts; pg. 134 for senators; pg. 148f for Assembly districts; pg. 228f for assemblymen]
- Political History of the State of New York from January 1, 1841, to January 1, 1847, Vol III, including the Life of Silas Wright (Hall & Dickson, Syracuse NY, 1848; pg. 368 to 565)
- The Whig Almanac and Politicians Register for 1844 (pg. 56)
