= Albert Lester =

American politician

Albert Lester (c. 1803 – March 14, 1867) was an American lawyer and politician.

== Life ==
Lester removed from Litchfield, Connecticut, to Canandaigua.

He was a Democratic member of the New York State Senate (7th D.) from 1844 to 1847, sitting in the 67th, 68th, 69th and 70th New York State Legislatures. On February 12, 1847, Lester was elected President pro tempore of the State Senate, to preside during the absence of the Lieutenant Governor. In May 1847, Lt. Gov. Addison Gardiner was elected to the New York Court of Appeals and took office on July 5. Gardiner thus vacated the office of lieutenant governor—who is ex officio President of the State Senate—and Lester became Acting Lieutenant Governor of New York. Urged by Governor John Young, the State Legislature passed on September 27 a law to hold a special election for lieutenant governor at the New York state election, 1847 to fill the vacancy, and Hamilton Fish was elected to take office on January 1, 1848.

Lester died in Canandaigua (town), New York, on March 14, 1867. He was buried at the West Avenue Cemetery in Canandaigua.

== Sources ==
- The American Almanac and Repository of Useful Knowledge by Jared Sparks, Francis Bowen & George Partridge Sanger (Gray and Bowen, 1847; page 245)
- The New York Civil List compiled by Franklin Benjamin Hough (pages 32, 134ff and 143; Weed, Parsons and Co., 1858)
- Political Graveyard
- Gravestone info, transcribed at NY GenWeb
- Political History of the State of New York from January 1, 1841, to January 1, 1847, Vol III, including the Life of Silas Wright by Jabez Delano Hammond (Hall & Dickson, Syracuse NY, 1848; pages 367f)
- The Regents of the University of the State of New York: 1784-1959 compiled by Albert Bickmore Corey (University of the State of New York, 1959; pages 23 and 33)

New York State Senate
Preceded by Lyman Sherwood	New York State Senate; Seventh District (Class 1); 1844–1847	Succeeded by district abolished
Political offices
Preceded by Addison Gardiner	Lieutenant Governor of New York; Acting; 1847	Succeeded by Hamilton Fish
