= 69th New York State Legislature =

New York state legislative session

←	68th	70th	→
- The Old State Capitol (1879)

Overview
- Legislative body: New York State Legislature
- Jurisdiction: New York, United States
- Term: January 1 – December 31, 1846

Senate
- Members: 32
- President: Lt. Gov. Addison Gardiner (D)
- Temporary President: Samuel Young, from April 29
- Party control: Democratic (25-6-1)

Assembly
- Members: 128
- Speaker: William C. Crain (D)
- Party control: Democratic (74-52-2)

Sessions
- 1st: January 6 – May 13, 1846

The 69th New York State Legislature, consisting of the New York State Senate and the New York State Assembly, met from January 6 to May 13, 1846, during the second year of Silas Wright's governorship, in Albany.

== Background ==
Under the provisions of the New York Constitution of 1821, 32 Senators were elected on general tickets in eight senatorial districts for four-year terms. They were divided into four classes, and every year eight Senate seats came up for election. Assemblymen were elected countywide on general tickets to a one-year term, the whole Assembly being renewed annually.

On May 13, 1845, an "Act recommending a Convention of the people of this State" was passed, submitting at the next State election to the people the question whether they wanted to call a convention to amend the State Constitution.

At this time there were two major political parties: the Democratic Party and the Whig Party. The Democratic Party was split into two factions: the "Barnburners" and the "Hunkers." The radical abolitionists appeared as the Liberty Party. The Anti-Rent Party nominated some candidates, but mostly cross-endorsed Whigs or Democrats, according to their opinion on the rent issue. In and near New York City, the originally called American Republican Party became now known as the "Native Americans", "Nativists" or "Know Nothings". (Note: Native American at this time described white citizens born in the United States ("native born citizen"), as opposed to immigrants who had been granted citizenship after their arrival; not to be confused with "Native American", a term of modern use referring to people who during the 19th century were called "Indians".)

== Elections ==
The State election was held on November 4, 1845. The question whether to hold a Constitutional convention was answered in the affirmative, with 213,084 votes for and 33,283 votes against it.

State Senator Gideon Hard (8th D.) was re-elected.

1845 New York State Senate election result
District	Democrat		Whig		Liberty	Native American	
First	Edward Sanford	20,301	Bradish	14,439	119	Ely	9,831
Second	Saxton Smith	19,929	Warren	15,723	94	Palen	361
Third	Nichols	18,846	William H. Van Schoonhoven	24,929	440		
Fourth	Samuel Young	21,488	James G. Hopkins	20,428	2,378		
Fifth	Lyman J. Walworth	18,908	Joshua A. Spencer	19,337	4,641		
Sixth	Thomas J. Wheeler	20,790	Dana	19,424	2,031		
Seventh	Richard H. Williams	19,422	John M. Holley	19,052	2,996		
Eighth	Stoddard	14, 701	Gideon Hard	20,543	2,390		

== Sessions ==
On January 5, the Democratic assemblymen met in caucus and nominated William C. Crain (Barnb.) for Speaker with 48 votes against 22 for Benjamin Bailey (Barnb.).

The Legislature met for the regular session at the Old State Capitol in Albany on January 6, 1846; and adjourned on May 13.

William C. Crain (D) was elected Speaker with 73 votes against 44 for John Young (W) and 7 for Ira Harris (A-R). William W. Dean (D) was elected Clerk of the Assembly with 77 votes against 48 for George W. Weed (W).

On February 2, the Legislature elected Adjutant General Thomas Farrington (Barnb.) to succeed Benjamin Enos (Hunker) as State Treasurer.

On March 7, Andrew G. Chatfield (Hunker) was elected Speaker pro tempore with 50 votes against 45 for Benjamin Bailey (Barnb.) and 3 for Alvah Worden (W), to preside over the Assembly during the absence of Speaker Crain.

On March 30, the Legislature re-apportioned the Assembly districts: Chautauqua, Chenango, Columbia, Cortland, Madison, Ontario and Wyoming counties lost one seat each; Albany, Erie, Kings and St. Lawrence counties gained one seat each; and New York City gained three seats. The total number of assemblymen remained 128.

On April 22, the Legislature enacted that the number of delegates to the Constitutional convention should be the same as the number of assemblymen, and that they should be elected according to the new Assembly apportionment.

The delegates to the Constitutional convention were elected on April 28.

On April 29, Samuel Young was elected president pro tempore of the Senate.

On May 13, the Legislature re-apportioned the Senate districts: Kings County was transferred from the 1st to the 2nd District; Ulster County from the 2nd to the 3rd District; and Schenectady County from the 3rd to the 4th District.

The Constitutional convention met at Albany on June 1; and adjourned on October 9. Ex-Lt. Gov. John Tracy (D) was elected President of the convention with 69 votes against a scattered vote of the Whigs. The amended Constitution abolished rotative renewal of the Senate, required all legislators to be elected in single districts, and made the State cabinet offices elective by popular ballot. The new Constitution was submitted to the electorate at the next State election, and was adopted by a large majority.

The Whig state convention met on September 23 at Utica; Philip Hone was Chairman. They nominated Assemblyman John Young for Governor; and Hamilton Fish for Lieutenant Governor.

The Democratic state convention met on October 1 at Syracuse; Chester Loomis was Chairman. They nominated Gov. Silas Wright and Lt. Gov. Addison Gardner for re-election.

The Anti-Rent state convention met in October at Beardsley's Hotel in Albany, and endorsed John Young (W) for Governor; and Lt. Gov. Addison Gardiner (D) for re-election.

The Native American state convention nominated Ogden Edwards for Governor; and State Senator George Folsom for Lieutenant Governor.

The Liberty state convention nominated Henry Bradley for Governor and William L. Chaplin for Lieutenant Governor.

== State Senate ==
=== Districts ===
- The First District (4 seats) consisted of Kings, New York and Richmond counties.
- The Second District (4 seats) consisted of Dutchess, Orange, Putnam, Queens, Rockland, Suffolk, Sullivan, Ulster and Westchester counties.
- The Third District (4 seats) consisted of Albany, Columbia, Delaware, Greene, Rensselaer, Schenectady and Schoharie counties.
- The Fourth District (4 seats) consisted of Clinton, Essex, Franklin, Fulton, Hamilton, Herkimer, Montgomery, St. Lawrence, Saratoga, Warren and Washington counties.
- The Fifth District (4 seats) consisted of Jefferson, Lewis, Madison, Oneida, Oswego and Otsego counties.
- The Sixth District (4 seats) consisted of Allegany, Broome, Cattaraugus, Chemung, Chenango, Livingston, Steuben, Tioga and Tompkins counties.
- The Seventh District (4 seats) consisted of Cayuga, Cortland, Onondaga, Ontario, Seneca, Wayne and Yates counties.
- The Eighth District (4 seats) consisted of Chautauqua, Erie, Genesee, Monroe, Niagara, Orleans and Wyoming counties.
Note: There are now 62 counties in the State of New York. The counties which are not mentioned in this list had not yet been established, or sufficiently organized, the area being included in one or more of the abovementioned counties.

=== Members ===
The asterisk (*) denotes members of the previous Legislature who continued in office as members of this Legislature. William H. Van Schoonhoven changed from the Assembly to the Senate.

District	Senators	Term left	Party	Notes
First	John A. Lott*	1 year	Democrat/Hunker	
First	David R. Floyd-Jones*	2 years	Democrat/Hunker	also a delegate to the Constitutional convention
First	George Folsom*	3 years	Native American	
First	Edward Sanford	4 years	Democrat	
Second	Abraham A. Deyo*	1 year	Democrat/Barnburner	
Second	Joshua B. Smith*	2 years	Democrat	
Second	Robert Denniston*	3 years	Democrat	
Second	Saxton Smith	4 years	Democrat	
Third	John C. Wright*	1 year	Democrat	
Third	Stephen C. Johnson*	2 years	Democrat/Barnburner	
Third	John P. Beekman*	3 years	Democrat	
Third	William H. Van Schoonhoven*	4 years	Whig/Anti-Rent	also a delegate to the Constitutional convention
Fourth	Thomas B. Mitchell*	1 year	Democrat/Hunker	
Fourth	Orville Clark*	2 years	Democrat/Hunker	
Fourth	Augustus C. Hand*	3 years	Democrat	
Fourth	Samuel Young	4 years	Democrat/Barnburner	on April 29, 1846, elected president pro tempore
Fifth	Carlos P. Scovil*	1 year	Democrat	
Fifth	Thomas Barlow*	2 years	Democrat/Barnburner	also First Judge of the Madison County Court
Fifth	Enoch B. Talcott*	3 years	Democrat/Barnburner	
Fifth	Joshua A. Spencer	4 years	Whig	
Sixth	Calvin T. Chamberlain*	1 year	Democrat	
Sixth	Clark Burnham*	2 years	Democrat	
Sixth	George D. Beers*	3 years	Democrat	
Sixth	Thomas J. Wheeler	4 years	Democrat	
Seventh	John Porter*	1 year	Democrat	
Seventh	Albert Lester*	2 years	Democrat	
Seventh	Henry J. Sedgwick*	3 years	Democrat/Barnburner	
Seventh	Richard H. Williams	4 years	Democrat	
Eighth	Harvey Putnam*	1 year	Whig	
Eighth	Frederick F. Backus*	2 years	Whig	
Eighth	Carlos Emmons*	3 years	Whig	
Eighth	Gideon Hard*	4 years	Whig	

=== Employees ===
- Clerk: Isaac R. Elwood

== State Assembly ==
=== Districts ===
- Albany County (3 seats)
- Allegany County (2 seats)
- Broome County (1 seat)
- Cattaraugus County (2 seats)
- Cayuga County (3 seats)
- Chautauqua County (3 seats)
- Chemung County (1 seat)
- Chenango County (3 seats)
- Clinton County (1 seat)
- Columbia County (3 seats)
- Cortland County (2 seats)
- Delaware County (2 seats)
- Dutchess County (3 seats)
- Erie County (3 seats)
- Essex County (1 seat)
- Franklin County (1 seat)
- Fulton and Hamilton counties (1 seat)
- Genesee County (2 seats)
- Greene County (2 seats)
- Herkimer County (2 seats)
- Jefferson County (3 seats)
- Kings County (2 seats)
- Lewis County (1 seat)
- Livingston County (2 seats)
- Madison County (3 seats)
- Monroe County (3 seats)
- Montgomery County (2 seats)
- The City and County of New York (13 seats)
- Niagara County (2 seats)
- Oneida County (4 seats)
- Onondaga County (4 seats)
- Ontario County (3 seats)
- Orange County (3 seats)
- Orleans County (1 seat)
- Oswego County (2 seats)
- Otsego County (3 seats)
- Putnam County (1 seat)
- Queens County (1 seat)
- Rensselaer County (3 seats)
- Richmond County (1 seat)
- Rockland County (1 seat)
- St. Lawrence County (2 seats)
- Saratoga County (2 seats)
- Schenectady County (1 seat)
- Schoharie County (2 seats)
- Seneca County (1 seat)
- Steuben County (3 seats)
- Suffolk County (2 seats)
- Sullivan County (1 seat)
- Tioga County (1 seat)
- Tompkins County (2 seats)
- Ulster County (2 seats)
- Warren County (1 seat)
- Washington (2 seats)
- Wayne County (2 seats)
- Westchester County (2 seats)
- Wyoming County (2 seats)
- Yates County (1 seat)
Note: There are now 62 counties in the State of New York. The counties which are not mentioned in this list had not yet been established, or sufficiently organized, the area being included in one or more of the abovementioned counties.

=== Assemblymen ===
The asterisk (*) denotes members of the previous Legislature who continued as members of this Legislature.

Party affiliations follow the vote on Speaker.

District	Assemblymen	Party	Notes
Albany	Ira Harris*	Whig/Anti-Rent	also a delegate to the Constitutional convention
Albany	Thomas L. Shafer	Democrat/Anti-Rent	
Albany	Robert D. Watson	Democrat/Anti-Rent	
Allegany	Nathaniel Coe*	Whig	
Allegany	John G. Collins*	Whig	
Broome	Salphronius H. French	Whig	
Cattaraugus	Elijah A. Rice	Whig	
Cattaraugus	Gideon Searl	Whig	
Cayuga	Samuel Bell	Whig	
Cayuga	William J. Cornwell	Whig	
Cayuga	John T. Rathbun	Whig	
Chautauqua	Madison Burnell	Whig	
Chautauqua	Valorus Lake	Whig	
Chautauqua	Elisha Ward	Whig	
Chemung	Abraham Primmer	Democrat	
Chenango	Solomon Ensign Jr.	Democrat	
Chenango	William G. Sands	Democrat	
Chenango	Hiram E. Storrs	Whig	
Clinton	Noyes P. Gregory*	Democrat	
Columbia	William E. Heermance	Democrat/Anti-Rent	
Columbia	Jeremiah Hover	Democrat/Anti-Rent	
Columbia	Levi Pitts	Democrat/Anti-Rent	
Cortland	Amos Graves	Democrat	
Cortland	John Miller	Whig	also a delegate to the Constitutional convention
Delaware	Orrin Foote	Anti-Rent	
Delaware	Reuben Lewis	Anti-Rent	
Dutchess	Elnathan Haxtun	Whig	
Dutchess	George T. Pierce	Democrat	unsuccessfully contested by Epenetus Crosby (W)
Dutchess	Daniel Sherwood	Democrat	
Erie	John T. Bush*	Whig	
Erie	Nathan K. Hall	Whig	on November 3, 1846, elected to the 30th U.S. Congress
Erie	James Wood	Whig	
Essex	Caleb D. Barton	Whig	
Franklin	Sidney Lawrence	Democrat	on November 3, 1846, elected to the 30th U.S. Congress
Fulton and Hamilton	Clark S. Grinnell	Democrat	
Genesee	Heman Blodgett	Whig	
Genesee	Aaron Long*	Whig	
Greene	Neely Lawrence	Democrat	
Greene	Peter W. Van Bergen	Democrat	
Herkimer	William C. Crain*	Democrat/Barnburner	elected Speaker
Herkimer	Henry Eysaman	Democrat	
Jefferson	Henderson Howk	Democrat	
Jefferson	Elihu M. McNeil	Democrat	
Jefferson	Levi Miller	Democrat	
Kings	Gamaliel King	Democrat	
Kings	John A. Voorhees	Democrat	
Lewis	Nelson J. Beach	Whig	
Livingston	William S. Fullerton	Whig	
Livingston	John Young*	Whig	on November 3, 1846, elected Governor of New York
Madison	Horace Hawks	Democrat	
Madison	Thomas T. Loomis	Democrat	
Madison	Stephen M. Potter	Democrat	
Monroe	Mathias L. Angle	Whig	
Monroe	William C. Bloss*	Whig	
Monroe	James R. Thompson	Whig	
Montgomery	Benjamin Baird	Democrat	
Montgomery	Theodore R. Lidelle	Democrat	
New York	Joseph C. Albertson	Democrat	
New York	Gerardus Boyce	Democrat	
New York	John E. Develin	Democrat	
New York	Joshua Fleet	Democrat	
New York	Robert H. Ludlow	Democrat	
New York	Wilson Small	Democrat	
New York	Thomas Spofford	Democrat	
New York	Jonathan D. Stevenson	Democrat	
New York	Alexander Stewart	Democrat	
New York	Samuel J. Tilden	Democrat	also a delegate to the Constitutional convention
New York	James H. Titus	Democrat	
New York	John Townsend	Democrat	
New York	Alexander Wells	Democrat	
Niagara	Lot Clark	Whig	
Niagara	Morgan Johnson	Whig	
Oneida	Chauncey C. Cook	Whig	
Oneida	Benjamin F. Cooper	Whig	
Oneida	Daniel G. Dorrance	Whig	
Oneida	Russel Fuller	Whig	
Onondaga	Julius C. Kinne*	Democrat	
Onondaga	Elihu L. Phillips	Whig	
Onondaga	Lake I. Tefft*	Democrat	
Onondaga	Alonzo Wood	Democrat	
Ontario	Elias Cost	Whig	
Ontario	Joseph C. Shelton	Whig	
Ontario	Alvah Worden*	Whig	also a delegate to the Constitutional convention
Orange	William L. Benedict	Democrat	
Orange	Wilkins Seacord	Democrat	
Orange	Robert R. Thompson	Democrat	
Orleans	Dexter Kingman	Whig	
Oswego	Reuben Drake	Democrat	
Oswego	Thomas Skelton*	Democrat	
Otsego	Ebenezer Blakely	Whig/Anti-Rent	
Otsego	Delos W. Dean	Democrat	
Otsego	Benjamin Morehouse	Democrat	
Putnam	Benjamin Bailey*	Democrat/Barnburner	
Queens	John Willis	Democrat	
Rensselaer	Henry Z. Hayner	Whig/Anti-Rent	
Rensselaer	Samuel McClellan	Whig/Anti-Rent	
Rensselaer	Justus Nolton	Whig/Anti-Rent	
Richmond	George H. Cole	Democrat	
Rockland	Samson Marks	Democrat	
St. Lawrence	Asa L. Hazelton*	Democrat	
St. Lawrence	Bishop Perkins	Democrat	also a delegate to the Constitutional convention
Saratoga	Chauncey Boughton	Whig	
Saratoga	James M. Marvin	Whig	
Schenectady	David M. Moore	Democrat	
Schoharie	Thomas Lawyer	Democrat	
Schoharie	Thomas Smith	Whig/Anti-Rent	
Seneca	Alanson Woodworth	Democrat	
Steuben	Andrew G. Chatfield	Democrat/Hunker	on March 7, 1846, elected Speaker pro tempore
Steuben	Otto F. Marshall	Democrat	
Steuben	William C. Rogers*	Democrat	
Suffolk	Samuel B. Gardiner	Democrat	
Suffolk	Richard A. Udall	Democrat	
Sullivan	Richard Oliver	Democrat	
Tioga	Gideon O. Chase*	Democrat	
Tompkins	James W. Montgomery	Democrat	
Tompkins	Henry S. Walbridge	Whig	
Ulster	Charles Drake	Democrat	
Ulster	Joseph W. Low	Democrat	
Warren	Winfield S. Sherwood	Democrat/Hunker	
Washington	James M. Foster	Whig	
Washington	Lodewecus S. Viele	Whig	
Wayne	Elias Durfee	Whig	
Wayne	James T. Wisner	Whig	
Westchester	John R. Hayward	Democrat	
Westchester	Ezra Marshall	Democrat	
Wyoming	Arden Woodruff	Whig	
Wyoming	Andrew W. Young*	Whig	also a delegate to the Constitutional convention
Yates	George W. Wolcott	Democrat	

=== Employees ===
- Clerk: William W. Dean
- Sergeant-at-Arms: Samuel S. Wood
- Doorkeeper: Horatio G. Pope
- Assistant Doorkeeper: Israel R. Neahr
- Second Assistant Doorkeeper: Francis N. Bradt

== Sources ==
- The New York Civil List compiled by Franklin Benjamin Hough (Weed, Parsons and Co., 1858) [pg. 58f for Constitutional convention; pg. 109 and 441 for Senate districts; pg. 135 for senators; pg. 148f for Assembly districts; pg. 231f for assemblymen]
- Political History of the State of New York from January 1, 1841, to January 1, 1847, Vol III, including the Life of Silas Wright (Hall & Dickson, Syracuse NY, 1848; pg. 570 to 686)
- Journal of the Senate (69th Session) (1846)
- The Whig Almanac for 1847 (pg. 60)
