= Senator Backus =

Senator Backus may refer to:

- Franklin Thomas Backus (1813–1870), Ohio State Senate
- Frederick F. Backus (1794–1858), New York State Senate
- Henry T. Backus (1809–1877), Michigan State Senate
- Jan Backus (born 1947), Vermont State Senate

== See also ==
- Spencer Bachus (born 1947), Alabama State Senate
