= Nelson J. Beach =

American politician

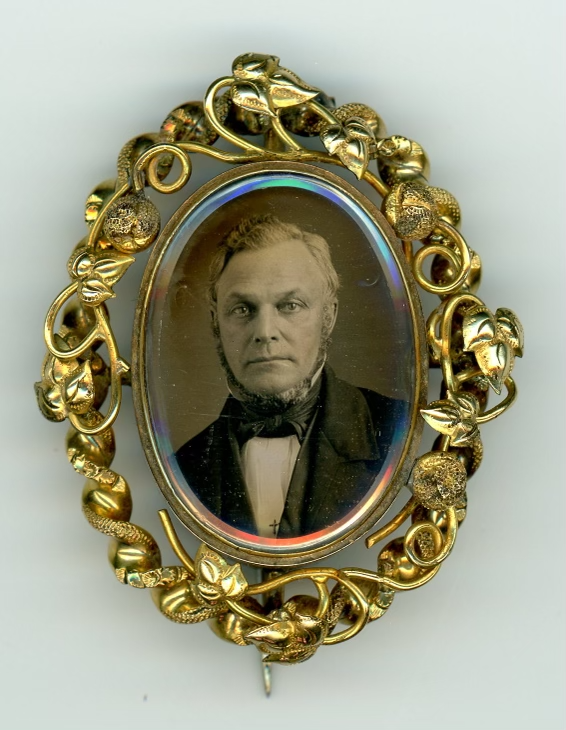
Nelson J. Beach

Nelson John Beach (September 21, 1800 Hebron, Tolland County, Connecticut - February 22, 1876 Watson, Lewis County, New York) was an American surveyor, businessman and politician from New York.

== Life ==
He was the son of John Beach (1770–1845). The family moved from Litchfield, Connecticut, to Watson, New York, in 1814. He married Emily Porter, and their children were George Byron Beach (d. 1870) and Anna Lydia Beach.

Beach became a land surveyor, and was engaged on the survey of a highway through the wilderness, projected to run from Crown Point on Lake Champlain to Carthage, Jefferson County, New York.

An Act, passed on March 29, 1828, by the New York State Legislature, allowed Nelson J. Beach to erect and exploit a toll bridge over the Black River between Lowville, NY, and Watson, New York.

He was Supervisor of the Town of Watson from 1831 to 1834, from 1837 to 1838, and in 1845. He was a Whig member of the New York State Assembly (Lewis Co.) in 1846, and of the New York State Senate (5th D.) in 1847. Here he advocated the construction of the Black River Canal.

He was one of the first three Canal Commissioners elected in 1847 under the New York State Constitution of 1846, and drew the two-year term, being in office from 1848 to 1849. In 1849, he ran for re-election on the Whig ticket, but was defeated by Frederick Follett. From January 1850 to November 1852, he was a Canal Appraiser. In 1854, he became Vice-President and Superintendent of Construction of the Hudson River Railroad. In 1855, he resigned this post, and accepted the appointment as Resident Engineer on the Eastern Division of the New York State Canals, remaining on the canal work for two years. Afterwards he took charge of the abandoned Ogdensburg, Clayton and Rome Railroad and closed up its affairs.

In 1862, President Abraham Lincoln appointed him Assessor of Internal Revenue for the counties of Jefferson, Lewis and Herkimer.

== See also ==
- List of New York state senators

== Sources ==
- Laws of the State of New York (Fifty-first Session, 1828)
- Short bio in A History of Lewis County, in the State of New York: From the Beginning of Its Settlement to the Present Time by Franklin Benjamin Hough (Munsell & Rowland, Albany NY, 1860; pages 218f)
- The New York Civil List compiled by Franklin Benjamin Hough (pages 42f, 135, 138, 232 and 258; Weed, Parsons and Co., 1858)
- Obit of his son G. B. Beach, in NYT on August 12, 1870
- Bios of canal engineers, at Rochester History

New York State Assembly
| Preceded by Dean S. Howard | New York State Assembly; Lewis County; 1846 | Succeeded by Thomas Baker |
New York State Senate
| Preceded by Carlos P. Scovil | New York State Senate; Fifth District (Class 4); 1847 | Succeeded by district abolished |
