= William Bartlit =

American politician

William Bartlit (1793 Conway, then in Hampshire Co., now in Franklin County, Massachusetts – February 19, 1871 Wellsville, Allegany County, New York) was a Democratic American politician from New York.

== Life ==
In 1814, he moved to Cortland, New York where he took of the occupation of being a harness and saddle maker.

He was a member of the New York State Senate (7th D.) from 1842 to 1845, sitting in the 65th, 66th, 67th and 68th New York State Legislatures.

He was buried at the cemetery in Cortland.

== Sources ==
- The New York Civil List compiled by Franklin Benjamin Hough (pages 133ff and 138; Weed, Parsons and Co., 1858)
- Obituary transcribed from the Cortland County Standard (issue of March 21, 1871), at RootsWeb

New York State Senate
Preceded by John Maynard	New York State Senate; Seventh District (Class 3); 1842–1845	Succeeded by Richard H. Williams
