= 66th New York State Legislature =

New York state legislative session

←	65th	67th	→
- The Old State Capitol (1879)

Overview
- Legislative body: New York State Legislature
- Jurisdiction: New York, United States
- Term: January 1 – December 31, 1843

Senate
- Members: 32
- President: Lt. Gov. Daniel S. Dickinson (D)
- Party control: Democratic (22-10)

Assembly
- Members: 128
- Speaker: George R. Davis (D)
- Party control: Democratic (92-36)

Sessions
- 1st: January 3 – April 18, 1843

The 66th New York State Legislature, consisting of the New York State Senate and the New York State Assembly, met from January 3 to April 18, 1843, during the first year of William C. Bouck's governorship, in Albany.

== Background ==
Under the provisions of the New York Constitution of 1821, 32 Senators were elected on general tickets in eight senatorial districts for four-year terms. They were divided into four classes, and every year eight Senate seats came up for election. Assemblymen were elected countywide on general tickets to a one-year term, the whole Assembly being renewed annually.

On April 5, 1842, the Legislature enacted that future state elections be held on a single day, fixing the date on the Tuesday next after the first Monday in November.

State Senator John W. Taylor resigned on August 19, 1842, leaving a vacancy in the Fourth District.

At this time there were two major political parties: the Democratic Party and the Whig Party. The radical abolitionists appeared as the Liberty Party.

On September 7, 1842, the Democratic state convention met at Syracuse, and nominated again William C. Bouck for governor, and Daniel S. Dickinson for lieutenant governor.

On the same day, the Whig state convention nominated Lt. Gov. Luther Bradish for governor, and State Senator Gabriel Furman for lieutenant governor.

The Liberty Party nominated Alvan Stewart for governor, and Charles O. Shepard for lieutenant governor.

== Elections ==
The state election was held on November 8, 1842. William C. Bouck and Daniel S. Dickinson were elected governor and lieutenant governor.

Abraham A. Deyo (2nd D.), John C. Wright (3rd D.), Sidney Lawrence, Thomas B. Mitchell (both 4th D.), Calvin T. Chamberlain (6th D.), John Porter (7th D.), Harvey Putnam (8th D.), and assemblymen John A. Lott (1st D.) and Carlos P. Scovil (5th D.) were elected to the Senate. Putnam was a Whig, the other eight were Democrats.

== Sessions ==
The Legislature met for the regular session at the Old State Capitol in Albany on January 3, 1843; and adjourned on April 18.

George R. Davis (D) was elected Speaker with 89 votes against 32 for Willis Hall (W). Henry N. Wales (D) was elected Clerk of the Assembly with 91 votes against 35 for Philander B. Prindle (W).

On January 21, the Legislature elected Edwin Croswell (D) to succeed Thurlow Weed as State Printer.

On February 6, the Legislature re-elected State Treasurer Thomas Farrington (D).

On February 7, the Legislature re-elected U.S. Senator Silas Wright, Jr. to a six-year term beginning on March 4, 1843.

== State Senate ==
=== Districts ===
- The First District (4 seats) consisted of Kings, New York and Richmond counties.
- The Second District (4 seats) consisted of Dutchess, Orange, Putnam, Queens, Rockland, Suffolk, Sullivan, Ulster and Westchester counties.
- The Third District (4 seats) consisted of Albany, Columbia, Delaware, Greene, Rensselaer, Schenectady and Schoharie counties.
- The Fourth District (4 seats) consisted of Clinton, Essex, Franklin, Fulton, Hamilton, Herkimer, Montgomery, St. Lawrence, Saratoga, Warren and Washington counties.
- The Fifth District (4 seats) consisted of Jefferson, Lewis, Madison, Oneida, Oswego and Otsego counties.
- The Sixth District (4 seats) consisted of Allegany, Broome, Cattaraugus, Chemung, Chenango, Livingston, Steuben, Tioga and Tompkins counties.
- The Seventh District (4 seats) consisted of Cayuga, Cortland, Onondaga, Ontario, Seneca, Wayne and Yates counties.
- The Eighth District (4 seats) consisted of Chautauqua, Erie, Genesee, Monroe, Niagara, Orleans and Wyoming counties.
Note: There are now 62 counties in the State of New York. The counties which are not mentioned in this list had not yet been established, or sufficiently organized, the area being included in one or more of the abovementioned counties.

=== Members ===
The asterisk (*) denotes members of the previous Legislature who continued in office as members of this Legislature. John A. Lott and Carlos P. Scovil changed from the Assembly to the Senate.

District	Senators	Term left	Party	Notes
First	Morris Franklin*	1 year	Whig	
First	John B. Scott*	2 years	Democrat	
First	Isaac L. Varian*	3 years	Democrat	
First	John A. Lott*	4 years	Democrat	
Second	John Hunter*	1 year	Democrat	
Second	Robert Denniston*	2 years	Democrat	
Second	Abraham Bockee*	3 years	Democrat	
Second	Abraham A. Deyo	4 years	Democrat	
Third	Erastus Root*	1 year	Whig	
Third	Henry W. Strong*	2 years	Democrat	also Recorder of Troy
Third	Erastus Corning*	3 years	Democrat	
Third	John C. Wright	4 years	Democrat	until February 9, 1843, also First Judge of the Schoharie County Court
Fourth	James G. Hopkins*	1 year	Whig	
Fourth	Sidney Lawrence	2 years	Democrat	elected to fill vacancy, in place of John W. Taylor; until March 31, 1843, also Surrogate of Franklin Co.
Fourth	Edmund Varney*	3 years	Democrat	
Fourth	Thomas B. Mitchell	4 years	Democrat	
Fifth	Sumner Ely*	1 year	Democrat	
Fifth	Henry A. Foster*	2 years	Democrat	
Fifth	William Ruger*	3 years	Democrat	died on May 21, 1843
Fifth	Carlos P. Scovil*	4 years	Democrat	
Sixth	Andrew B. Dickinson*	1 year	Whig	
Sixth	Nehemiah Platt*	2 years	Whig	
Sixth	James Faulkner*	3 years	Democrat	
Sixth	Calvin T. Chamberlain	4 years	Democrat	
Seventh	Lyman Sherwood*	1 year	Democrat	
Seventh	Elijah Rhoades*	2 years	Whig	
Seventh	William Bartlit*	3 years	Democrat	
Seventh	John Porter	4 years	Democrat	
Eighth	Abram Dixon*	1 year	Whig	
Eighth	Samuel Works*	2 years	Whig	
Eighth	Gideon Hard*	3 years	Whig	
Eighth	Harvey Putnam	4 years	Whig	until January 14, 1843, also Surrogate of Wyoming Co.

=== Employees ===
- Clerk: Isaac R. Elwood
- Deputy Clerks: Charles Bryan, Robert F. Salvidge
- Sergeant-at-Arms: Charles Niven
- Doorkeeper: Joel Gillett
- Assistant Doorkeeper: Martin Miller

== State Assembly ==
=== Districts ===
- Albany County (3 seats)
- Allegany County (2 seats)
- Broome County (1 seat)
- Cattaraugus County (2 seats)
- Cayuga County (3 seats)
- Chautauqua County (3 seats)
- Chemung County (1 seat)
- Chenango County (3 seats)
- Clinton County (1 seat)
- Columbia County (3 seats)
- Cortland County (2 seats)
- Delaware County (2 seats)
- Dutchess County (3 seats)
- Erie County (3 seats)
- Essex County (1 seat)
- Franklin County (1 seat)
- Fulton and Hamilton counties (1 seat)
- Genesee County (2 seats)
- Greene County (2 seats)
- Herkimer County (2 seats)
- Jefferson County (3 seats)
- Kings County (2 seats)
- Lewis County (1 seat)
- Livingston County (2 seats)
- Madison County (3 seats)
- Monroe County (3 seats)
- Montgomery County (2 seats)
- The City and County of New York (13 seats)
- Niagara County (2 seats)
- Oneida County (4 seats)
- Onondaga County (4 seats)
- Ontario County (3 seats)
- Orange County (3 seats)
- Orleans County (1 seat)
- Oswego County (2 seats)
- Otsego County (3 seats)
- Putnam County (1 seat)
- Queens County (1 seat)
- Rensselaer County (3 seats)
- Richmond County (1 seat)
- Rockland County (1 seat)
- St. Lawrence County (2 seats)
- Saratoga County (2 seats)
- Schenectady County (1 seat)
- Schoharie County (2 seats)
- Seneca County (1 seat)
- Steuben County (3 seats)
- Suffolk County (2 seats)
- Sullivan County (1 seat)
- Tioga County (1 seat)
- Tompkins County (2 seats)
- Ulster County (2 seats)
- Warren County (1 seat)
- Washington (2 seats)
- Wayne County (2 seats)
- Westchester County (2 seats)
- Wyoming County (2 seats)
- Yates County (1 seat)
Note: There are now 62 counties in the State of New York. The counties which are not mentioned in this list had not yet been established, or sufficiently organized, the area being included in one or more of the abovementioned counties.

=== Assemblymen ===
The asterisk (*) denotes members of the previous Legislature who continued as members of this Legislature.

Party affiliations follow the result given in Niles' Register.

District	Assemblymen	Party	Notes
Albany	Willis Hall	Whig	
Albany	Aaron Van Schaack	Whig	
Albany	John I. Slingerland	Whig	
Allegany	Robert Flint	Whig	
Allegany	Samuel Russell	Whig	
Broome	Gilbert Dickinson	Democrat	
Cattaraugus	Alonzo Hawley	Whig	
Cattaraugus	Elijah A. Rice	Whig	
Cayuga	Vincent Kenyon	Democrat	
Cayuga	Alfred Lyon	Democrat	
Cayuga	Darius Monroe	Democrat	
Chautauqua	Odin Benedict	Whig	
Chautauqua	Adolphus S. Morrison	Whig	
Chautauqua	Emory F. Warren*	Whig	
Chemung	Samuel G. Hathaway Jr.*	Democrat	
Chenango	Edward Cornell	Democrat	
Chenango	Samuel Medbury	Democrat	
Chenango	Danforth Wales	Democrat	
Clinton	Julius C. Hubbell	Democrat	
Columbia	Anson Brown	Democrat	
Columbia	Lucas Hoes	Democrat	
Columbia	Peter Poucher	Democrat	
Cortland	Harry McGraw	Whig	
Cortland	George N. Niles	Democrat	
Delaware	Milton Bostwick	Democrat	
Delaware	Nelson K. Wheeler	Democrat	
Dutchess	Gilbert Bentley	Democrat	
Dutchess	John Elseffer	Democrat	
Dutchess	John M. Ketcham*	Democrat	
Erie	George R. Babcock	Whig	
Erie	Wells Brooks	Whig	
Erie	Milton McNeal	Whig	
Essex	Samuel Shumway	Whig	
Franklin	Joseph H. Jackson	Whig	
Fulton and Hamilton	John L. Hutchinson	Democrat	
Genesee	Robinson Smiley*	Whig	
Genesee	Ira Wait	Whig	
Greene	Aaron Bushnell	Democrat	
Greene	Philip Teats	Democrat	
Herkimer	Walter Booth	Democrat	
Herkimer	John T. Hall	Democrat	
Jefferson	Elihu C. Church*	Democrat	
Jefferson	Joseph Graves	Democrat	
Jefferson	Job Lamson	Democrat	
Kings	William Conselyea Jr.	Democrat	
Kings	William M. Udall*	Democrat	
Lewis	Amos Buck	Democrat	
Livingston	Daniel H. Fitzhugh	Whig	
Livingston	Daniel D. Spencer	Whig	
Madison	Venoni W. Mason	Democrat	
Madison	Henry Palmer	Democrat	
Madison	Lorenzo Sherwood	Democrat	
Monroe	Jerome Fuller	Whig	
Monroe	Robert Haight	Whig	
Monroe	Enoch Strong	Whig	
Montgomery	John Bowdish	Democrat	
Montgomery	John I. Zoller	Democrat	
New York	Elbridge G. Baldwin*	Whig	
New York	Charles P. Daly	Democrat	
New York	George G. Glasier	Democrat	
New York	Timothy R. Hibbard	Democrat	
New York	David R. Floyd-Jones*	Democrat	
New York	William McMurray*	Democrat	
New York	Absalom E. Miller	Democrat	
New York	George Paulding	Democrat	
New York	Daniel C. Pentz*	Democrat	
New York	Edward Sanford	Democrat	
New York	Robert Smith	Whig	
New York	James T. Thomson	Democrat	
New York	Edward H. White	Democrat	
Niagara	Thomas T. Flagler*	Whig	
Niagara	John Sweeney	Whig	
Oneida	Dan P. Cadwell	Democrat	
Oneida	Amos S. Fassett	Democrat	
Oneida	David Murray	Democrat	
Oneida	John H. Tower	Democrat	
Onondaga	Benjamin French	Democrat	
Onondaga	Thomas McCarthy	Democrat	
Onondaga	Thomas Sherwood	Democrat	
Onondaga	Charles R. Vary	Democrat	
Ontario	Sylvester Austin	Whig	
Ontario	James C. Brown	Whig	
Ontario	Jedediah Dewey Jr.	Whig	
Orange	Leonard Lee	Democrat	
Orange	John W. Martin	Democrat	
Orange	John Van Duzer	Democrat	
Orleans	Elisha Wright	Whig	
Oswego	William F. Allen	Democrat	
Oswego	Alban Strong	Democrat	
Otsego	Silas Burleson	Democrat	
Otsego	John R. Griggs	Democrat	
Otsego	Harvey Hunt	Democrat	
Putnam	Sylvenus Warren	Democrat	
Queens	Samuel Youngs	Democrat	
Rensselaer	George R. Davis*	Democrat	elected Speaker; also First Judge of the Rensselaer County Court
Rensselaer	Samuel Douglass	Democrat	
Rensselaer	Henry Vandenbergh	Democrat	
Richmond	Henry Cole*	Democrat	
Rockland	Cornelius M. Demarest	Democrat	
St. Lawrence	Calvin T. Hulburd*	Democrat	
St. Lawrence	George Redington*	Democrat	
Saratoga	Lyndes Emerson	Democrat	
Saratoga	Azariah E. Stimson	Democrat	
Schenectady	Edward H. Walton	Democrat	
Schoharie	John Osterhout	Democrat	
Schoharie	Abraham Richtmeyer	Democrat	
Seneca	Matthew West	Democrat	
Steuben	Morris Brown	Democrat	
Steuben	Francis E. Erwin*	Democrat	
Steuben	Ziba A. Leland*	Democrat	
Suffolk	Samuel B. Nicoll	Democrat	
Suffolk	Joshua B. Smith	Democrat	
Sullivan	Jonathan Stratton	Democrat	
Tioga	Simeon R. Griffin	Democrat	
Tompkins	Sylvanus Larned	Democrat	
Tompkins	George T. Spink	Democrat	
Ulster	William Soper	Democrat	
Ulster	Edmund Suydam	Democrat	
Warren	Pelatiah Richards	Whig	
Washington	Anson Bigelow	Whig	
Washington	James W. Porter	Whig	
Wayne	Frederick U. Sheffield	Democrat	
Wayne	Philip Sours	Democrat	
Westchester	Andrew Findlay	Democrat	
Westchester	Samuel L. Holmes	Democrat	
Wyoming	Eleazer Baldwin*	Whig	
Wyoming	Truman Benedict	Whig	
Yates	Richard H. Williams	Democrat	

=== Employees ===
- Clerk: Henry N. Wales
- Sergeant-at-Arms: Pliny M. Bromley
- Doorkeeper: John W. Turner
- Assistant Doorkeeper: Isaac Satterlee
- Second Assistant Doorkeeper: Henry Rankin

== Sources ==
- The New York Civil List compiled by Franklin Benjamin Hough (Weed, Parsons and Co., 1858) [pg. 109 and 441 for Senate districts; pg. 134 for senators; pg. 148f for Assembly districts; pg. 227f for assemblymen]
- Political History of the State of New York from January 1, 1841, to January 1, 1847, Vol III, including the Life of Silas Wright (Hall & Dickson, Syracuse NY, 1848; pg. 311 to 368)
