= Nehemiah Platt =

American politician

Nehemiah Platt (July 25, 1797 – March 29, 1851) was an American politician from New York.

== Life ==
He married Diantha Wilson (1804–1866), and they had several children. He was Supervisor of the Town of Nichols from 1825 to 1827.

He was a member of the New York State Senate (3rd D.) from 1841 to 1844, sitting in the 64th, 65th, 66th and 67th New York State Legislatures.

U.S. Senator Thomas C. Platt (1833–1910) was his nephew.

== Sources ==
- The New York Civil List compiled by Franklin Benjamin Hough (pages 133f and 144; Weed, Parsons and Co., 1858)
- History of Nichols, NY transcribed at Ray's History

New York State Senate
Preceded by Daniel S. Dickinson	New York State Senate; Sixth District (Class 2); 1841–1844	Succeeded by George D. Beers
