= Isaac L. Varian =

American politician (1793–1864)

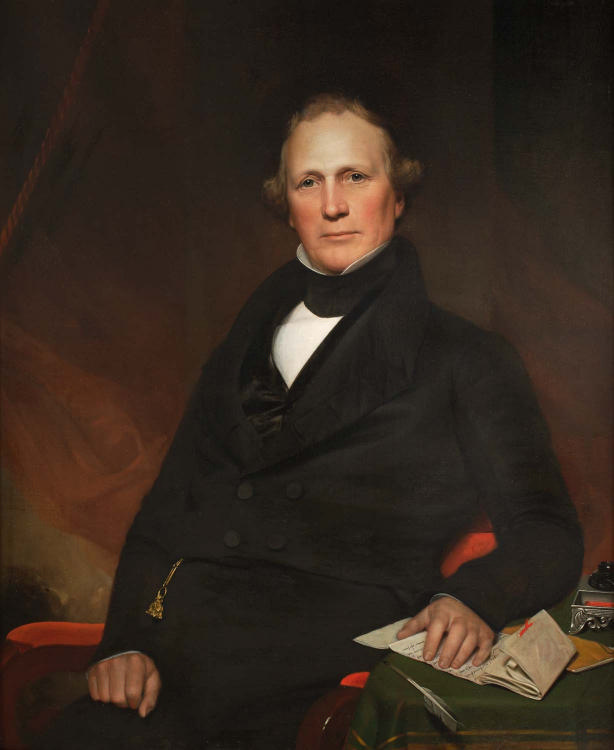
- Portrait of Varian, c. 1842

64th Mayor of New York City
- In office 1839–1841
- Preceded by: Aaron Clark
- Succeeded by: Robert Morris

Personal details
- Born: June 25, 1793 New York, New York, U.S.
- Died: August 10, 1864 (aged 71) Peekskill, New York, U.S.
- Party: Democratic
- Spouse: Catharine Hopper Dusenbury

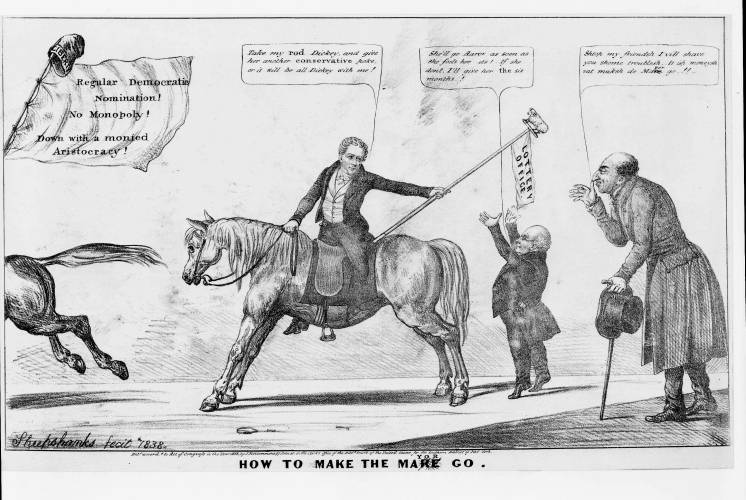
An 1838 cartoon, "How to Make the ~~Mare~~ Mayor Go", depicts Varian (exiting stage left) and Clark (on a stalled mare). The Jew (right) suggests it's money that makes the mayor go.

Isaac Leggett Varian (June 25, 1793 – August 10, 1864) was a New York state legislator and the 64th Mayor of New York City.

== Political career ==
Varian was a Democrat and led Tammany Hall from 1835 until 1842. He was a member of the New York State Assembly (New York Co.) in 1831, 1832 1833; 64th Mayor of New York City from 1839 to 1841; and a member of the New York State Senate (1st D.) from 1842 to 1845, sitting in the 65th, 66th, 67th and 68th New York State Legislatures.

As Tammany Hall leader, Varian presided over a critical period in Democratic history, which saw the defection, and return of the Locofoco faction, which was in existence from 1835 until 1840, and was the decisive factor in the 1837 mayoral election won by Whigs against the divided Democrats.

Varian first ran for mayor in 1838, losing to Whig Aaron Clark by only 519 votes in an election tainted with allegations of massive Whig fraud and intimidation. In 1839, Varian beat Clark by 1,067 votes despite blatant electoral misconduct. During Varian's first term, the legislature passed a bill that mandated voter registration and made it a lot harder to commit electoral fraud.

== Personal ==
In 1811 Varian married Catharine Hopper Dusenbury (1789–1870). They had nine children, seven of whom survived infancy:

- Andrew Hopper (1812–1826)
- Tamar Letitia (b. 1813)
- Isaac (1815–1816)
- Matilda Campbell (b. 1817)
- Mary Elizabeth (1819–1868)
- Isaac (b. 1823)
- Catharine Emeline (b. 1826)
- Jacob Harsen (twin) (b. 1828)
- Hannah (twin) (1828–1830)

In 1845 Varian quit politics and retired to Peekskill, where he died in 1864. He is buried in the New York City Marble Cemetery.

== The Valentine-Varian House ==
The Valentine-Varian House (1758) is a historic farmhouse that still stands on what used to be the Varian dairy farm in the Bronx along the route from New York City to Boston. The Varian family occupied the house from 1791 until 1905. At present, the building houses the Museum of Bronx History. A public park and an elementary school in the area are named after Varian.

== Sources ==
- Gustavus Myers,, Ch. XIV, New York City (1901)
- Varian family genealogy
- Political Graveyard listing for Isaac Varian
- 1838 political cartoon about the mayoral election
- Valentine-Varian House profile from the Historic House Trust
- Valentine-Varian House profile from the Bronx Historical Society
- Varian House Park from the NYC Dept. of Parks & Recreation

New York State Senate
Preceded by Gulian C. Verplanck	New York State Senate; First District (Class 3); 1842–1845	Succeeded by Edward Sanford
