= Enoch B. Talcott =

American lawyer and politician (1811–1868)

Enoch B. Talcott (April 30, 1811 in Herkimer, Herkimer County, New York – June 21, 1868 in Utica, Oneida County, New York) was an American lawyer and politician from New York.

== Life ==
He was the son of Enoch Talcott (1780–1814) and Lydia (Barton) Talcott. He graduated from Union College in 1836. Then he studied law, was admitted to the bar and commenced practice in Oswego. On July 6, 1842, he married Mary G. Doolittle, and they had six children.

He was a member of the New York State Senate (5th D.) from 1845 to 1847, sitting in the 68th, 69th and 70th New York State Legislatures.

He was Collector of Customs for the District of Oswego from May 1853 to March 1858. In October 1858, he was appointed Receiver of the Agricultural Bank of Herkimer, and the Dairymen's Bank of Newport.

In 1866, he removed to Utica, and continued the practice of law there.

== Sources ==
- The New York Civil List compiled by Franklin Benjamin Hough (pages 135 and 146; Weed, Parsons and Co., 1858)
- The Bankers' Magazine (1858; pg. 677)
- Obit in The American annual Cyclopaedia for 1868 (Appleton, 1869; pg. 569)
- Talcott genealogy
- The District of Oswego with list of Collectors

New York State Senate
Preceded by Henry A. Foster	New York State Senate; Fifth District (Class 2); 1845–1847	Succeeded by district abolished
