= Harvey Putnam =

American politician (1793–1855)

Member of the U.S. House of Representatives from New York
- In office March 4, 1847 – March 3, 1851
- Preceded by: Albert Smith
- Succeeded by: Augustus P. Hascall
- Constituency: 33rd district
- In office November 7, 1838 – March 3, 1839
- Preceded by: William Patterson
- Succeeded by: Seth M. Gates
- Constituency: 29th district

New York State Senator from the Eighth District
- In office 1843–1846
- Preceded by: Henry Hawkins
- Succeeded by: Francis H. Ruggles

Personal details
- Born: January 5, 1793 Brattleboro, Vermont, U.S.
- Died: September 20, 1855 (aged 62) Attica, New York, U.S.
- Resting place: Forest Hill Cemetery; Attica, New York, U.S.
- Party: Whig
- Spouse: Myra Osborne (m. 1817)
- Children: James O. Putnam
- Parent(s): Asa Putnam; Anna (Collins) Putnam
- Occupation: Lawyer; politician

Harvey Putnam (January 5, 1793 – September 20, 1855) was an American lawyer and politician. He was a Whig member of the U.S. House of Representatives, and served in the New York Senate.

== Early life ==
Putnam was born in Brattleboro, Windham County, Vermont, the youngest of nine children of Asa Putnam and Anna (Collins) Putnam. His father died while he was an infant, and he went with his mother to live with relatives in Williamstown, Massachusetts, and later with relatives in Cobleskill, New York.

He attended the common schools and studied law in Skaneateles, New York, supporting himself by teaching. In 1816, he was admitted to the bar and began the practice of law in Attica, New York, in 1817.

== Political career ==
He became involved in politics and held several offices in Attica, He was elected as a Whig to the 25th United States Congress, to fill the vacancy caused by the death of William Patterson, holding office from November 7, 1838, to March 3, 1839.

Putnam was appointed as Surrogate of Genesee County in 1840, an office he held until the division of the county. He was then appointed as Surrogate of Wyoming County, remaining in office until 1843.

He was a member of the New York State Senate (Eight District) from 1843 to 1846, sitting in the 66th, 67th, 68th and 69th Legislatures.

He was elected as a Whig to the 30th and 31st United States Congresses, holding office from March 4, 1847, to March 3, 1851. After leaving Congress, he resumed the practice of law.

Putnam died on September 20, 1855, in Attica, and is interred in Forest Hill Cemetery in Attica.

== Family life ==
Putnam married Myra Osborne of Skaneateles, New York, on August 5, 1817. Their son was James O. Putnam, New York State Senator and U.S. Minister to Belgium.

U.S. House of Representatives
Preceded by William Patterson	Member of the U.S. House of Representatives from New York's 29th congressional district 1838–1839	Succeeded by Seth M. Gates
New York State Senate
Preceded by Henry Hawkins	New York State Senate; Eighth District (Class 4); 1843–1846	Succeeded by Francis H. Ruggles
U.S. House of Representatives
Preceded by Albert Smith	Member of the U.S. House of Representatives from New York's 33rd congressional district 1847–1851	Succeeded by Augustus P. Hascall
