= Edward Sanford (New York politician) =

American politician

Edward Sanford (1805 – 1876) was an American lawyer, poet, essayist, political writer and politician from New York.

== Life ==
He was the son of Chancellor Nathan Sanford (1777–1838). He graduated from Union College in 1824. Then he studied law with Benjamin F. Butler, and was admitted to the bar in 1825. He practiced law for a few years, but abandoned this to become a writer and newspaper editor.

Edward Sanford was a member of the New York State Assembly (New York Co.) in 1843 and 1844; and a member of the New York State Senate (1st D.) in 1846 and 1847.

In the New York state election, 1847, he ran on the Democratic and Anti-Rent tickets for Secretary of State of New York, but was defeated by Whig Christopher Morgan.

His sister Mary Sanford (1814–1841) was married to State Senator Peter Gansevoort (1788–1876).

== Sources ==
- The New York Civil List compiled by Franklin Benjamin Hough (pages 135, 145, 227, 229 and 301; Weed, Parsons and Co., 1858)
- Edward Sanford in Cyclopaedia of American Literature by Evert A. & George L. Duyckinck (Charles Scribner, New York City, 1856; Vol. II, pg. 406–412)

New York State Senate
Preceded by Isaac L. Varian	New York State Senate; First District (Class 3); 1846–1847	Succeeded by district abolished
