= Azel Backus =

American educator

- Portrait of Azel Backus
- Born: October 13, 1765; Franklin, Connecticut, U.S.
- Died: December 28, 1816 (aged 51); Clinton, New York, U.S.
- Resting place: Hamilton College Cemetery; 43.05218°N 75.40318°W
- Education: Yale College
- Occupations: Preacher and Educator
- Spouse: Melicent Demming

Azel Backus (October 13, 1765 – December 28, 1816) was an American educator, born in Franklin, Connecticut. After having a long preaching career, he was elected as the first President of Hamilton College in New York. He died on December 28, 1816, in Clinton, New York, at the age of 51 and is buried in Hamilton College Cemetery.

== Early life ==
Azel was born to Congregationalist parents, Jabez Jr. and Deborah Backus on October 13, 1765 in Franklin, Connecticut. He lost his father, Jabez, at the age of five which resulted in devolving of his education entirely on his mother, Deborah, for several years. He went to live with his uncle, Rev. Charles Backus at the age of seventeen. His uncle, Charles Backus, was a Congregational minister at Somers, Connecticut. Azel was fitted to attend College under his instruction. In 1783, he entered Yale College. While he was at Yale, he grew deistic opinions and graduated in 1787 from there. After graduation he was faced with a difficult choice of profession, as his religious opinion inclined him to the ministry, but he preferred to join the Army. When he decided to enter the Army, his uncle, Charles Backus, induced him to work in the ministry. Later he studied theology with his uncle Charles, and was licensed to preach by the Association of Tolland County Ministers on June 1, 1790.

== Career ==
Soon after he left college, he joined as a teacher in a Grammar school at Wethersfield, Connecticut. After receiving his license to preach from Association of Tolland County, he preached at Ellington, Connecticut, on several Sabbaths and soon received multiple invitations to preach and become their pastor.

Backus, in 1798, was appointed by Oliver Wolcott, the first governor of Connecticut, to preach before the Legislature, The Annual Election Sermon, as well as Wolcott's funeral.

He was chosen General Association of Connecticut's Moderator in June 1808. Shortly after that, in 1810, the College of New Jersey (later Princeton) honored him with Doctor of Divinity degree.

After moving to Bethlehem, Connecticut, he founded a select school for preparing students for College admission.

Backus was elected as the first president of Hamilton College in September 1812.

== Personal life and death ==
In February 1791, Backus married Melicent Demming of Wethersfield. Backus was survived by five of eight children, including F. F. Backus, a practicing physician at Rochester for many years after graduating from Yale College in 1813. F. F. Backus was a member of the New York Senate for four years, from 1844 to 1847.

Backus fell ill with typhus fever in December 1816. He died on December 28, 1816. His daughter Wealtha Ann married Hamilton's first valedictorian, Gerrit Smith, but died young of encephalitis. His wife Melicent died at the age 88 in October 1853.

== Writings ==
- Sermons on Important Subjects, by the late Rev. Azel Backus, S.T.D. First President of Hamilton College to which is prefixed, A Sketch of the Life of the Author. Utica, New York. 1824.
