= Gideon Hard =

American politician (1797–1885)

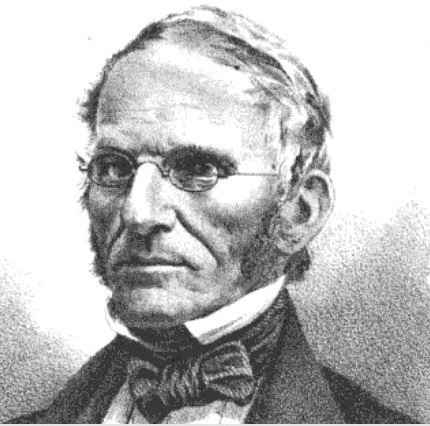
- Gideon, "Pioneer History of Orleans County, New York" (1871)

Member of the U.S. House of Representatives from New York's 33rd district
- In office March 4, 1833 – March 3, 1837
- Succeeded by: Charles F. Mitchell

Member of the New York Senate from the 8th district
- In office January 1, 1842 – December 31, 1847
- Preceded by: William A. Moseley

Personal details
- Born: April 29, 1797 Arlington, Vermont, USA
- Died: April 27, 1885 (aged 87) Albion, New York, USA
- Resting place: Mount Albion Cemetery
- Party: Anti-Masonic; Anti-Jacksonian; Whig

Gideon Hard (April 29, 1797 in Arlington, Bennington County, Vermont – April 27, 1885 in Albion, Orleans County, New York) was an American lawyer and politician from New York.

== Life ==
He graduated from Union College in 1822. Then he studied law, was admitted to the bar in 1825, and commenced practice in Newport (now Albion), New York, in 1826.

Hard was elected as an Anti-Mason to the 23rd, and re-elected as an Anti-Jacksonian to the 24th United States Congress, holding office from March 4, 1833, to March 3, 1837.

He was Commissioner of Schools of Barre, New York from 1841 to 1848; and a member of the New York State Senate from 1842 to 1847, sitting in the 65th, 66th, 67th, 68th, 69th and 70th New York State Legislatures.

He was a Canal Appraiser from 1849 to 1850. Afterwards he resumed the practice of law. He was First Judge and Surrogate of the Orleans County Court from 1856 to 1860.

He was buried at the Mount Albion Cemetery.

U.S. House of Representatives
New district	Member of the U.S. House of Representatives from New York's 33rd congressional district 1833–1837	Succeeded by Charles F. Mitchell
New York State Senate
Preceded by William A. Moseley	New York State Senate; Eighth District (Class 3); 1842–1847	Succeeded by district abolished
