= John Townsend (New York City) =

American politician

John Townsend (1789–1863) was an American politician from New York.

== Life ==
He was the son of Israel Townsend (1742–1832) and Phebe (Weeks) Townsend (1752–1836). The family lived in Armonk, a hamlet in the Town of North Castle, Westchester County, New York. John Townsend married Eliza P. Horton, and they had six children.

He fought in the War of 1812, and was an associate judge of the Westchester County Court from 1816 to 1834. Afterwards he removed to New York City.

He was a member of the New York State Assembly (New York Co.) in 1846; and a member of the New York State Senate (1st D.) in 1847.

== Sources ==
- The New York Civil List compiled by Franklin Benjamin Hough (pages 135, 146, 232 and 310; Weed, Parsons and Co., 1858)
- A Memorial of John, Henry and Richard Townsend and Their Descendants (1865; pg. 202f)
- North Castle History (Vol. 28, 2008) [with "Israel Townsend House" on the front cover]

New York State Senate
Preceded by John A. Lott	New York State Senate; First District (Class 4); 1847	Succeeded by district abolished
