= George C. Sherman =

American politician

George Corlis Sherman (December 14, 1799 in Providence, Rhode Island – April 23, 1853 in Watertown, Jefferson County, New York) was an American lawyer and politician from New York.

== Life ==
He was the son of Phineas Sherman (1773–1813) and Emma (Thornton) Sherman (1774–1847). He studied law at Watertown, and was admitted to the bar in 1823. On January 3, 1828, he married Mary Ann Hubbard (1806–1892), a sister of the two wives of State Senator Robert Lansing (1799–1878), and they had six children.

He was District Attorney of Jefferson County from 1833 to 1840. From 1836 to 1846, he practiced law in partnership with Robert Lansing. From 1843 to 1847, Sherman was an associate judge of the Jefferson County Court. He was a member of the New York State Senate (5th D.) in 1844 and 1845. He was Supervisor of the Town of Watertown in 1848.

Congressman Frederick Lansing (1838–1894) was his son-in-law.

== Sources ==
- The New York Civil List compiled by Franklin Benjamin Hough (pages 134f, 145 and 375; Weed, Parsons and Co., 1858)
- Sherman genealogy at NY Gen Web [gives 1863 as death year]
- Geographical Gazetteer of Jefferson County (e-book; pg. 93)
- History of Watertown transcribed at Ray's Place

New York State Senate
Preceded by William Ruger	New York State Senate; Fifth District (Class 3); 1844–1845	Succeeded by Joshua A. Spencer
