= Carlos P. Scovil =

American politician

Carlos Philander Scovil (February 26, 1804 – April 25, 1904) was an American lawyer and politician from New York. He was born in Collinsville, Lewis County, New York and died in Lowville, Lewis Co., New York.

== Life ==
He was the son of Hezekiah Scovil (1779–1855) and Catherine (Brown) Scovil (1783–1850). He studied law in Collinsville, Turin and Martinsburg (then the county seat of Lewis County), and was admitted to the bar in 1830. He practiced law in partnership with Francis Seger in 1831.

He was Clerk of Lewis County from 1832 to 1840. On August 18, 1834, he married Mary Rockwell and they had two children. He was a member of the New York State Assembly (Lewis Co.) in 1842.

He was a member of the New York State Senate (5th D.) from 1843 to 1846, sitting in the 66th, 67th, 68th and 69th New York State Legislatures.

He was First Judge and Surrogate of the Lewis County Court from 1864 to 1874. He removed to Lowville, the county seat since 1864. He retired from the bench at the end of 1874 when he reached the constitutional age limit.

He was buried at the Lowville Rural Cemetery.

His daughter Christine Kellogg Scovil (b. 1840) was married to Assemblyman Henry A. Phillips (b. 1834).

== Sources ==
- The New York Civil List compiled by Franklin Benjamin Hough (pages 134f, 145, 226, 302 and 389; Weed, Parsons and Co., 1858)
- ONE HUNDRED YEARS in The Syracuse Journal on February 27, 1904
- OLDEST EX-ASSEMBLYMAN DEAD in NYT on April 28, 1904
- The New York Civil List compiled by Franklin Benjamin Hough, Stephen C. Hutchins and Edgar Albert Werner (1867; pg. 434)
- Phillips genealogy at RootsWeb

New York State Assembly
Preceded by Eliphalet Sears	New York State Assembly; Lewis Co. 1842	Succeeded by Amos Buck
New York State Senate
Preceded by Joseph Clark	New York State Senate; Fifth District (Class 4); 1843–1846	Succeeded by Nelson J. Beach
