= Stephen C. Johnson (politician) =

American politician

Stephen C. Johnson was an American lawyer and politician from New York.

== Life ==
He was the son of Jotham Johnson and Hannah (Crosby) Johnson, and was born in Thompson, Windham County, Connecticut. In November 1826, he removed to Delhi, New York, where he studied law, first with his brother Noadiah Johnson (1795–1839) who was District Attorney of Delaware County from 1827 to 1833, and then with Amasa J. Parker. Stephen was admitted to the bar in 1830, and on January 6, 1831, he married Mary Ann Swift (1808–1886).

He was a member of the New York State Senate (3rd D.) from 1844 to 1847, sitting in the 67th, 68th, 69th and 70th New York State Legislatures.

== Sources ==
- The New York Civil List compiled by Franklin Benjamin Hough (pages 134f and 142; Weed, Parsons and Co., 1858)
- The American Biographical Sketch Book by William Hunt (1849; pg. 216–219)

New York State Senate
Preceded by Erastus Root	New York State Senate; Third District (Class 1); 1844–1847	Succeeded by district abolished
