= Orville Clark =

American politician

Orville Clark (June 29, 1801 – March 19, 1862) was an American lawyer and politician from New York.

== Life ==
He was born on June 29, 1801, in Mount Holly, Rutland County, Vermont. His family removed to Ohio in 1815. He graduated from the American Literary, Scientific and Military Academy at Norwich, Vermont. In 1828, he removed to Sandy Hill, New York, and practiced law there. He married Delice Marice Martindale (1805–1881), daughter of Congressman Henry C. Martindale (1780–1860), and they had two children.

Clark was a member of the New York State Senate (4th D.) from 1844 to 1847, sitting in the 67th, 68th, 69th and 70th New York State Legislatures.

He was a major general of the New York State Militia.

He was President of the Des Moines Navigation and Railroad Company, and died of "congestion of the lungs" while on a business trip in Des Moines, Iowa, on March 19, 1862.

== Sources ==
- The New York Civil List compiled by Franklin Benjamin Hough (pages 134f and 139; Weed, Parsons and Co., 1858)
- The New York Almanac for 1857 (pg. 215)
- Journal of the House of Representatives of the State of Iowa (5th Session) (1855; Appendix, pg. 49)
- The Vermont Historical Gazetteer (1877; Vol. III, pg. 860)

New York State Senate
Preceded by James G. Hopkins	New York State Senate; Fourth District (Class 1); 1844–1847	Succeeded by district abolished
