= Clark Burnham =

American politician

Clark Burnham (May 22, 1802 Windham, Windham County, Connecticut – December 30, 1871 Utica, Oneida County, New York) was an American politician from New York.

== Life ==
He lived in Sherburne, Chenango County, New York, and was a contractor on the Chenango Canal. He married Fanny Avery (1808–1872).

He was a member of the New York State Assembly (Chenango Co.) in 1842.

He was a member of the New York State Senate (6th D.) from 1844 to 1847, sitting in the 67th, 68th, 69th and 70th New York State Legislature.

In 1851, he removed to Utica. In the New York state election, 1854 he ran on the Hard-shell Democratic and Know Nothing tickets for Canal Commissioner, but was defeated by Whig Henry Fitzhugh.

== Sources ==
- The New York Civil List compiled by Franklin Benjamin Hough (pages 134ff, 139, 226 and 262; Weed, Parsons and Co., 1858)
- Burnham genealogy at RootsWeb

New York State Senate
| Preceded by Andrew B. Dickinson | New York State Senate; Sixth District (Class 1); 1844 – 1847 | Succeeded by district abolished |
