= 70th New York State Legislature =

New York state legislative session

←	69th	71st	→
- The Old State Capitol (1879)

Overview
- Legislative body: New York State Legislature
- Jurisdiction: New York, United States
- Term: January 1 – December 31, 1847

Senate
- Members: 32
- President: Lt. Gov. Addison Gardiner (D), until July 4
- Temporary President: Albert Lester (D), from February 12
- Party control: Democratic (21-10-1)

Assembly
- Members: 128
- Speaker: William C. Hasbrouck (W)
- Party control: Whig (72-56)

Sessions
- 1st: January 5 – May 13, 1847
- 2nd: September 8 – December 15, 1847

The 70th New York State Legislature, consisting of the New York State Senate and the New York State Assembly, met from January 5 to December 15, 1847, during the first year of John Young's governorship, in Albany.

== Background ==
Under the provisions of the New York Constitution of 1821, 32 Senators were elected on general tickets in eight senatorial districts for four-year terms. They were divided into four classes, and every year eight Senate seats came up for election. Assemblymen were elected countywide on general tickets to a one-year term, the whole Assembly being renewed annually.

On May 13, 1845, an "Act recommending a Convention of the people of this State" was passed, submitting at the next State election to the people the question whether they wanted to call a convention to amend the State Constitution. At the State election in November 1845, the question was answered in the affirmative. The Constitutional convention met from June 1 to October 9, 1846. The amended Constitution abolished rotative renewal of the Senate, required all legislators to be elected in single districts, made the State cabinet offices elective by popular ballot, and made major changes in the judicial system. The new Constitution was submitted to the electorate at the next State election for ratification.

On March 30, 1846, the Legislature re-apportioned the Assembly districts: Chautauqua, Chenango, Columbia, Cortland, Madison, Ontario and Wyoming counties lost one seat each; Albany, Erie, Kings and St. Lawrence counties gained one seat each; and New York City gained three seats. The total number of assemblymen remained 128.

On May 13, 1846, the Legislature re-apportioned the Senate districts: Kings County was transferred from the 1st to the 2nd District; Ulster County from the 2nd to the 3rd District; and Schenectady County from the 3rd to the 4th District.

At this time there were two major political parties: the Democratic Party and the Whig Party. The Democratic Party was split into two factions: the "Barnburners" and the "Hunkers." The radical abolitionists appeared as the Liberty Party. The Anti-Rent Party nominated some candidates, but mostly cross-endorsed Whigs or Democrats, according to their opinion on the rent issue.

The Whig state convention met on September 23 at Utica, and nominated Assemblyman John Young for Governor; and Hamilton Fish for Lieutenant Governor.

The Democratic state convention met on October 1 at Syracuse, and nominated Gov. Silas Wright and Lt. Gov. Addison Gardner for re-election.

The Anti-Rent state convention met in October at Beardsley's Hotel in Albany, and endorsed John Young (W) for Governor; and Lt. Gov. Addison Gardiner (D) for re-election.

The Native American state convention nominated Ogden Edwards for Governor; and State Senator George Folsom for Lieutenant Governor.

The Liberty state convention nominated Henry Bradley for Governor and William L. Chaplin for Lieutenant Governor.

== Elections ==
The 1846 New York state election was held on November 3. John Young (W) was elected Governor; and Lt. Gov. Addison Gardiner (D) was re-elected. The new Constitution was adopted by a large majority, with 221,528 votes for and 92, 436 against it.

Harvey R. Morris (2nd D.), Thomas Crook (4th D.), Samuel H. P. Hall (6th D.), Abraham Gridley (7th D.), Francis H. Ruggles (8th D.); and assemblymen John Townsend (1st D.), Ira Harris (3rd D.) and Nelson J. Beach (5th D.) were elected to the State Senate.

== Sessions ==
The Legislature met for the regular session at the Old State Capitol in Albany on January 5, 1847; and adjourned on May 13.

William C. Hasbrouck (W) was elected Speaker with 71 votes against 50 for J. Lawrence Smith (D).

On February 12, Albert Lester (D) was elected president pro tempore of the State Senate, to preside during the absence of Lt. Gov. Gardiner.

On June 7, the 1847 New York special judicial election, was held to fill the judicial offices elective under the new State Constitution, for example the judges of the New York Court of Appeals, the justices of the district benches of the New York Supreme Court, county judges, surrogates, district attorneys etc. Lt. Gov. Gardiner was elected to the Court of Appeals. State Senators Ira Harris and Augustus C. Hand; and Assemblyman William B. Wright were elected to the Supreme Court.

On July 5, Lt. Gov. Gardiner took office on the Court of Appeals, and President pro tempore Albert Lester became Acting Lieutenant Governor.

The Legislature met for a special session on September 8, 1847; and adjourned on December 15.

On September 27, the Legislative passed "An Act to provide for the election of a Lieutenant Governor", to fill the vacancy at the next State election.

On November 15, the Legislature elected Thomas Clowes (W) as a Canal Commissioner, to fill the vacancy caused by the resignation of Nathaniel Jones (D).

== State Senate ==
=== Districts ===
- The First District (4 seats) consisted of New York and Richmond counties.
- The Second District (4 seats) consisted of Dutchess, Kings, Orange, Putnam, Queens, Rockland, Suffolk, Sullivan and Westchester counties.
- The Third District (4 seats) consisted of Albany, Columbia, Delaware, Greene, Rensselaer, Schoharie and Ulster counties.
- The Fourth District (4 seats) consisted of Clinton, Essex, Franklin, Fulton, Hamilton, Herkimer, Montgomery, St. Lawrence, Saratoga, Schenectady, Warren and Washington counties.
- The Fifth District (4 seats) consisted of Jefferson, Lewis, Madison, Oneida, Oswego and Otsego counties.
- The Sixth District (4 seats) consisted of Allegany, Broome, Cattaraugus, Chemung, Chenango, Livingston, Steuben, Tioga and Tompkins counties.
- The Seventh District (4 seats) consisted of Cayuga, Cortland, Onondaga, Ontario, Seneca, Wayne and Yates counties.
- The Eighth District (4 seats) consisted of Chautauqua, Erie, Genesee, Monroe, Niagara, Orleans and Wyoming counties.
Note: There are now 62 counties in the State of New York. The counties which are not mentioned in this list had not yet been established, or sufficiently organized, the area being included in one or more of the abovementioned counties.

=== Members ===
The asterisk (*) denotes members of the previous Legislature who continued in office as members of this Legislature. John Townsend, Ira Harris and Nelson J. Beach changed from the Assembly to the Senate.

Under the provisions of the new State Constitution, all senators were legislated out of office at the end of the year 1847, and all 32 seats were to be filled at the election in November 1847 with senators elected to a two-year term in single districts.

District	Senators	Term left	Party	Notes
First	David R. Floyd-Jones*	1 year	Democrat/Hunker	
First	George Folsom*	2 years	Native American	
First	Edward Sanford*	3 years	Democrat	
First	John Townsend*	4 years	Democrat	
Second	Joshua B. Smith*	1 year	Democrat	
Second	Robert Denniston*	2 years	Democrat	
Second	Saxton Smith*	3 years	Democrat	
Second	Harvey R. Morris	4 years	Democrat	
Third	Stephen C. Johnson*	1 year	Democrat/Barnburner	
Third	John P. Beekman*	2 years	Democrat	
Third	William H. Van Schoonhoven*	3 years	Whig/Anti-Rent	
Third	Ira Harris*	4 years	Whig/Anti-Rent	resigned his seat during the recess, after election to the New York Supreme Court
Fourth	Orville Clark*	1 year	Democrat/Hunker	
Fourth	Augustus C. Hand*	2 years	Democrat	resigned his seat during the recess, after election to the New York Supreme Court
Fourth	Samuel Young*	3 years	Democrat/Barnburner	
Fourth	Thomas Crook	4 years	Democrat	
Fifth	Thomas Barlow*	1 year	Democrat/Barnburner	until July 4, 1847, also First Judge of the Madison County Court
Fifth	Enoch B. Talcott*	2 years	Democrat/Barnburner	
Fifth	Joshua A. Spencer*	3 years	Whig	
Fifth	Nelson J. Beach*	4 years	Whig	on November 2, 1847, elected a Canal Commissioner
Sixth	Clark Burnham*	1 year	Democrat	
Sixth	George D. Beers*	2 years	Democrat	
Sixth	Thomas J. Wheeler*	3 years	Democrat	
Sixth	Samuel H. P. Hall	4 years	Whig	
Seventh	Albert Lester*	1 year	Democrat	on February 12, 1847, elected president pro tempore: from July 5, 1847, Acting Lieutenant Governor
Seventh	Henry J. Sedgwick*	2 years	Democrat/Barnburner	
Seventh	Richard H. Williams*	3 years	Democrat	
Seventh	Abraham Gridley	4 years	Whig	
Eighth	Frederick F. Backus*	1 year	Whig	
Eighth	Carlos Emmons*	2 years	Whig	
Eighth	Gideon Hard*	3 years	Whig	
Eighth	Francis H. Ruggles	4 years	Whig	

=== Employees ===
- Clerk: Isaac R. Elwood
- Deputy Clerk: John P. Lott
- Sergeant-at-Arms: Charles Bryan
- Doorkeeper: Jared S. Halsey
- Assistant Doorkeeper: Martin Miller
- Janitor: Burgess Wands
- Messengers: John H. Finnegan, Joseph Courtney Jr.

== State Assembly ==
=== Districts ===
- Albany County (4 seats)
- Allegany County (2 seats)
- Broome County (1 seat)
- Cattaraugus County (2 seats)
- Cayuga County (3 seats)
- Chautauqua County (2 seats)
- Chemung County (1 seat)
- Chenango County (2 seats)
- Clinton County (1 seat)
- Columbia County (2 seats)
- Cortland County (1 seat)
- Delaware County (2 seats)
- Dutchess County (3 seats)
- Erie County (4 seats)
- Essex County (1 seat)
- Franklin County (1 seat)
- Fulton and Hamilton counties (1 seat)
- Genesee County (2 seats)
- Greene County (2 seats)
- Herkimer County (2 seats)
- Jefferson County (3 seats)
- Kings County (3 seats)
- Lewis County (1 seat)
- Livingston County (2 seats)
- Madison County (2 seats)
- Monroe County (3 seats)
- Montgomery County (2 seats)
- The City and County of New York (16 seats)
- Niagara County (2 seats)
- Oneida County (4 seats)
- Onondaga County (4 seats)
- Ontario County (2 seats)
- Orange County (3 seats)
- Orleans County (1 seat)
- Oswego County (2 seats)
- Otsego County (3 seats)
- Putnam County (1 seat)
- Queens County (1 seat)
- Rensselaer County (3 seats)
- Richmond County (1 seat)
- Rockland County (1 seat)
- St. Lawrence County (3 seats)
- Saratoga County (2 seats)
- Schenectady County (1 seat)
- Schoharie County (2 seats)
- Seneca County (1 seat)
- Steuben County (3 seats)
- Suffolk County (2 seats)
- Sullivan County (1 seat)
- Tioga County (1 seat)
- Tompkins County (2 seats)
- Ulster County (2 seats)
- Warren County (1 seat)
- Washington (2 seats)
- Wayne County (2 seats)
- Westchester County (2 seats)
- Wyoming County (1 seat)
- Yates County (1 seat)
Note: There are now 62 counties in the State of New York. The counties which are not mentioned in this list had not yet been established, or sufficiently organized, the area being included in one or more of the abovementioned counties.

=== Assemblymen ===
The asterisk (*) denotes members of the previous Legislature who continued as members of this Legislature.

Party affiliations follow the vote on Clerk, except Keyser and Walsh (both NYC).

District	Assemblymen	Party	Notes
Albany	John Fuller	Democrat	
Albany	John I. Gallup	Democrat	
Albany	Valentine Treadwell	Whig	
Albany	Robert D. Watson*	Democrat/Anti-Rent	
Allegany	Grover Leavens	Whig	
Allegany	Samuel Russell	Whig	
Broome	Oliver C. Crocker	Democrat	
Cattaraugus	Rufus Crowley	Whig	
Cattaraugus	Joseph E. Weeden	Whig	
Cayuga	Samuel Bell*	Whig	
Cayuga	William J. Cornwell*	Whig	
Cayuga	John T. Rathbun*	Whig	
Chautauqua	Madison Burnell*	Whig	
Chautauqua	Charles J. Orton	Whig	
Chemung	William Maxwell	Democrat	previously a member from Tioga Co.
Chenango	Ransom Balcom	Whig	
Chenango	David McWhorter	Whig	
Clinton	Rufus Heaton	Democrat	
Columbia	John S. Gould	Whig	
Columbia	William M. Miller	Democrat	
Cortland	Timothy Green	Whig	
Delaware	Jonathan C. Allaben	Democrat	
Delaware	Donald Shaw	Whig	
Dutchess	Epenetus Crosby	Whig	
Dutchess	Walter Sherman	Whig	
Dutchess	Aves I. Vanderbilt	Whig	
Erie	Obadiah J. Green	Whig	
Erie	John D. Howe	Whig	
Erie	Horatio Shumway	Whig	
Erie	William H. Pratt	Whig	
Essex	William H. Butrick	Whig	
Franklin	Joseph R. Flanders	Democrat	
Fulton and Hamilton	Darius Moore	Whig	
Genesee	Heman Blodgett*	Whig	
Genesee	Alonzo S. Upham	Whig	
Greene	William V. B. Adams	Whig	
Greene	Almeron Marks	Democrat	
Herkimer	Abijah Beckwith	Democrat	
Herkimer	Jefferson Tillinghast	Democrat	
Jefferson	John Boyden	Democrat	
Jefferson	Samuel J. Davis	Democrat	
Jefferson	John D. Davison	Democrat	
Kings	John A. Emmons	Democrat	
Kings	Ebenezer W. Peck	Whig	
Kings	Abraham D. Soper	Democrat	
Lewis	Thomas Baker	Democrat	
Livingston	William S. Fullerton*	Whig	
Livingston	Andrew Sill	Whig	
Madison	George T. Taylor (politician)	Whig	
Madison	Peter Van Valkenburgh	Whig	
Monroe	William C. Bloss*	Whig	
Monroe	John McGonegal	Whig	
Monroe	John B. Smith	Whig	
Montgomery	Gamaliel Bowdish	Whig	
Montgomery	Andrew S. Gray	Whig	
New York	Alexander M. Alling	Democrat	
New York	Charles Baxter	Democrat	resigned on January 12, 1847, to fight in the Mexican–American War
New York	John H. Bowie	Democrat	
New York	Lyman Candee	Democrat	
New York	Edward R. Carpentier	Democrat	
New York	David J. Chatfield	Democrat	
New York	John E. Develin*	Democrat	
New York	Dennis Garrison	Democrat	
New York	Henry Keyser	Democrat	
New York	James C. Rutherford	Democrat	
New York	Daniel E. Sickles	Democrat	
New York	Wilson Small*	Democrat	
New York	Norman B. Smith	Democrat	
New York	Alexander Stewart*	Democrat	
New York	Michael Walsh	Democrat	
New York	Uzziah Wenman	Whig/Nat. Am.	
Niagara	Benjamin Carpenter	Whig	
Niagara	Christopher H. Skeele	Whig	
Oneida	Nathan Burchard	Whig	
Oneida	Abel E. Chandler	Democrat	
Oneida	Isaac Curry	Whig	
Oneida	John Dean	Democrat	
Onondaga	William Henderson	Democrat	
Onondaga	John Lakin	Democrat	
Onondaga	Manoah Pratt	Democrat	
Onondaga	Joseph Prindle	Whig	
Ontario	Emery B. Pottle	Whig	
Ontario	Ezra Pierce	Whig	
Orange	Joseph Davis	Democrat	
Orange	William C. Hasbrouck	Whig	elected Speaker
Orange	Hudson McFarlin	Whig	
Orleans	Abner Hubbard	Whig	
Oswego	Oren R. Earl	Whig	
Oswego	M. Lindley Lee	Whig	
Otsego	Cyrus Brown	Democrat	
Otsego	Francis U. Fenno	Democrat	
Otsego	William Temple	Democrat	
Putnam	Benjamin B. Benedict	Democrat	
Queens	Wessell S. Smith	Whig	
Rensselaer	Joseph Gregory	Whig	
Rensselaer	Amos K. Hadley	Whig	
Rensselaer	David S. McNamara	Whig	
Richmond	George H. Cole*	Democrat	
Rockland	John A. Haring	Democrat	
St. Lawrence	Phineas Atwater	Democrat	
St. Lawrence	Henry Barber	Democrat	
St. Lawrence	Bishop Perkins*	Democrat	
Saratoga	Joseph Daniels	Whig	
Saratoga	Thomas C. Morgan	Whig	
Schenectady	David Caw	Whig	
Schoharie	Elisha Hammond	Democrat	
Schoharie	Thomas Smith*	Whig/Anti-Rent	
Seneca	Ansel Bascom	Whig	
Steuben	Hiram Chapman	Democrat	
Steuben	William Diven	Whig	
Steuben	William Hunter	Democrat	
Suffolk	Henry Landon	Democrat	
Suffolk	J. Lawrence Smith	Democrat	
Sullivan	William B. Wright	Whig	resigned his seat during the recess, after election to the New York Supreme Court
Tioga	Charles R. Barstow	Whig	
Tompkins	Samuel Lawrence	Whig	
Tompkins	Henry W. Sage	Whig	
Ulster	Jacob H. De Witt	Whig	
Ulster	John D. L. Montanye	Whig	unsuccessfully contested by Isaac L. Hasbrouck (D)
Warren	John Hodgson 2d	Democrat	
Washington	Adolphus F. Hitchcock	Whig	
Washington	Samuel McDoual	Whig	
Wayne	Samuel Moore	Whig	
Wayne	Israel R. Southard	Whig	
Westchester	James E. Beers	Whig	unsuccessfully contested by John R. Hayward (D)
Westchester	Ezra Marshall*	Democrat	
Wyoming	Arden Woodruff*	Whig	
Yates	Nehemiah Raplee	Democrat	

=== Employees ===
- Clerk: Philander B. Prindle
- Sergeant-at-Arms: Daniel B. Davis
- Doorkeeper: Asa W. Carpenter
- Assistant Doorkeeper: DeWitt C. Crooker
- Second Assistant Doorkeeper: Robert Grant

== Sources ==
- The New York Civil List compiled by Franklin Benjamin Hough (Weed, Parsons and Co., 1858) [pg. 109 and 441 for Senate districts; pg. 135f for senators; pg. 148f for Assembly districts; pg. 232ff for assemblymen]
