= James W. Porter (politician) =

American politician

James W. Porter was an American politician.

He was a member of the New York State Assembly in 1843, representing Washington County during the 66th New York State Legislature as a Whig.
