= David D. Spencer =

American journalist (1799–1855)

New York State Prison Inspector
- In office January 1, 1848 – December 31, 1850

Personal details
- Born: 1799 Bristol, New York, U.S.
- Died: February 18, 1855 (aged 55–56) Ithaca, New York, U.S.
- Party: Whig
- Spouse: Melissa Lord (m. 1823)
- Children: 5, including Charles S. Spencer
- Occupation: Politician, editor

David D. Spencer (1799 Bristol, Ontario County, New York – February 18, 1855 Ithaca, Tompkins County, New York) was an American editor and politician from New York.

== Life ==
In 1810, his family removed to the town of Canandaigua, New York, where he learned to be a printer. In 1820, he began publishing with Henry R. Stockton the Republican Chronicle in Ithaca, New York. In 1823, he married Melissa Lord, and they had five children. From 1828 to 1853, he published with Anson Spencer the Ithaca Chronicle.

He was a delegate to the 1839 Whig National Convention. He was one of the first three Inspectors of State Prisons elected on the Whig ticket in 1847 under the New York State Constitution of 1846, and drew the three-year term, being in office from 1848 to 1850.

His son Charles S. Spencer (b. 1824) was a member of the New York State Assembly in 1859 and 1874.

== Sources ==
- The New York Civil List compiled by Franklin Benjamin Hough (page 45; Weed, Parsons and Co., 1858)
- Death of Hon. David D. Spencer in NYT on February 23, 1855
- Newspaper history in Gazetteer and Business Directory for Tompkins County, NY (1868; page 30)
