= Thomas J. Wheeler =

American judge

Thomas Jefferson Wheeler (November 16, 1803 Middlefield, Otsego County, New York – February 8, 1875 Conewango, Cattaraugus County) was an American medical doctor and politician from New York.

== Life ==
He came to Conewango about 1825, settled in the hamlet of Rutledge, and practiced medicine. He was Postmaster of Conewango for some time, and an associate judge of the Cattaraugus County Court from about 1834 to 1847. He was a presidential elector in 1836, voting for Martin Van Buren and Richard M. Johnson.

Wheeler was a member of the New York State Senate (6th D.) in 1846 and 1847.

He was buried at the Rutledge Cemetery in Conewango.

== Sources ==
- The New York Civil List compiled by Franklin Benjamin Hough (pages 135f, 147 and 329; Weed, Parsons and Co., 1858)
- New York Annual Register (1834; pg. 81)
- Rutledge Cemetery records
- Biography transcribed from The History of Cattaraugus County (1879), at RootsWeb

New York State Senate
Preceded by James Faulkner	New York State Senate; Sixth District (Class 3); 1846 – 1847	Succeeded by district abolished
