= Thomas Barlow (New York politician) =

American lawyer and politician

Thomas Barlow (March 14, 1805 Duanesburg, Schenectady County, New York – September 18, 1896 Canastota, Madison County, New York) was an American lawyer and politician from New York.

== Life ==
He was the son of Thomas Barlow (1772–1840) and Mary (Clark) Barlow (1772–1860). He studied law, was admitted to the bar in 1831, and commenced practice in Canastota. On January 16, 1834, he married Cornelia Genet Rowe (1806–1851), and they had six children.

He was First Judge of the Madison County Court from 1843 to 1847. He was a member of the New York State Senate (5th D.) from 1844 to 1847, sitting in the 67th, 68th, 69th and 70th New York State Legislature.

He formed a cabinet in natural history, gathering, mounting and arranging birds, animals, and especially insects. He lectured on natural history, and especially on entomology. In 1853, he was elected a member of the American Association for the Advancement of Science. On June 14, 1854, he married Charlotte (Spriggs) Sleeper, and they had a son.

He was buried at Lenox Rural Cemetery, in Lenox.

State Senator Elisha Barlow (1750–1828) was his grandfather; timber tycoon Thomas Barlow Walker (1840–1928) was his nephew.

== Sources ==
- The New York Civil List compiled by Franklin Benjamin Hough (pages 134f, 138 and 361; Weed, Parsons and Co., 1858)
- Barlow genealogy at RootsWeb

New York State Senate
Preceded by Sumner Ely	New York State Senate; Fifth District (Class 1); 1844 – 1847	Succeeded by district abolished
