= Richard H. Williams (New York politician) =

American politician

Richard H. Williams (born August 3, 1807 in Aurora, Cayuga County, New York) was an American politician from New York.

He was the son of Richard Montgomery Williams (1776–1837) and Amy (Hart) Williams (1779–1862). On October 23, 1834, he married Phebe Ryder, and they had five children. He was Postmaster of Middlesex, New York and later of Potter, New York, until 1842.

He was a member of the New York State Assembly (Yates Co.) in 1843; and of the New York State Senate (7th D.) in 1846 and 1847.

In 1863, he removed to New York City.

== Personal life ==
He married Phebe Ryder of Sing Sing in 1834, with whom he had several children. She survived him, dying a widow in 1897.

== Sources ==
- The New York Civil List compiled by Franklin Benjamin Hough (pages 135f, 147, 228 and 316; Weed, Parsons and Co., 1858)
- Table of the Post Offices in the United States (1831; pg. 76)
- Register of All Officers and Agents, Civil, Military, and Naval, in the Service of the United States (1843; pg. 130)
- Potter biographies

New York State Assembly
Preceded by Henry Spence	New York State Assembly; Yates Co. 1843	Succeeded by Thomas Seamans
New York State Senate
Preceded by William Bartlit	New York State Senate; Seventh District (Class 3); 1846–1847	Succeeded by district abolished
