= John C. Wright (New York politician) =

American lawyer and politician

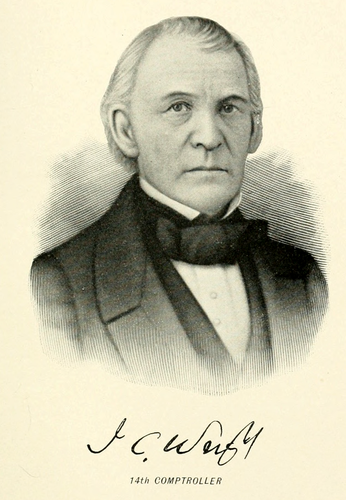

New York State Comptroller
- In office 1852–1853

Member of the New York Senate from the 3rd district
- In office 1843–1846

Personal details
- Born: 1801 Greene, New York
- Died: January 24, 1862 (aged 60–61) Schenectady, New York
- Occupation: Politician and lawyer

John Calvin Wright (1801 in Greene, Chenango County, New York – January 24, 1862 in Schenectady, New York) was an American lawyer and politician.

== Life ==
He was the son of Calvin Wright 1770–1843) and Sarah (Treadway) Wright (1765–1839). He graduated from Union College in 1820. He practiced law in Esperance, New York. On December 5, 1833, he married Louisa Marsh (1812–1843). He was First Judge of the Schoharie County Court from 1838 to 1843.

He was a member of the New York State Senate from 1843 to 1846, sitting in the 66th, 67th, 68th and 69th New York State Legislatures. In February 1844, he married Caroline Frost (1806–1846). After his tenure in the Senate he removed to Schenectady. On June 7, 1847, he married Sarah Brown (Worcester) Bouck (1819–1859).

He was New York State Comptroller from 1852 to 1853, elected on the Democratic ticket at the New York state election, 1851.

He was buried at the Cemetery in Esperance.

== Sources ==
- Google Books The New York Civil List compiled by Franklin Benjamin Hough (pages 34, 147 and 364; Weed, Parsons and Co., 1858)
- History of Schoharie County (pg. 322f)
- Wright genealogy at RootsWeb
- History of Schoharie County by William E. Roscoe (Syracuse NY, 1882; reprinted 2007; Vol. 2, pg. 370)
- The Worcester Family by Jonathan Fox Worcester (1856; pg. 51)

New York State Senate
Preceded by Alonzo C. Paige	New York State Senate; Third District (Class 4); 1843–1846	Succeeded by Ira Harris
Political offices
Preceded by Philo C. Fuller	New York State Comptroller; 1852–1853	Succeeded by James M. Cook
