= 1847 New York state election =

- November 2, 1847

The 1847 New York state election was held on November 2, 1847, to elect the lieutenant governor in a special election, the secretary state, the state comptroller, the attorney general, the state treasurer, the state engineer, three Canal Commissioners and three Inspectors of State Prisons, as well as all members of the New York State Assembly and the New York State Senate. The 1847 New York special judicial election was held in June as well.

== History ==
The New York State Constitution of 1846 legislated the incumbent state officers and members of legislature out of office. It required a number of state officers, who had been elected by the state legislature, to be elected by general ballot.

At the first judicial election under the Constitution of 1846, Lieutenant Governor Addison Gardiner was elected to the New York Court of Appeals, and took office on July 4, 1847, thus vacating the lieutenant governorship. To fill the vacancy, on September 27, an Act by the state legislature authorized a special election, to be held at the annual state election.

The Democratic state convention met in September in Syracuse, New York. The party split over the slavery question, and the Barnburners abandoned the convention. Orville Hungerford defeated Azariah C. Flagg for the nomination for Comptroller with 59 votes to 47.

The Barnburners held a separate state convention on October 26 at Herkimer, New York, but did not nominate a ticket. They told their followers "to vote as they must do when no regular nominations have been made," suggesting to support the Whig nominees rather than the Hunkers on the Democratic ticket.

The Anti-Rent state convention nominated Shepard for Lieutenant Governor with 11 votes for him, and 10 for Fish, on the second ballot.

== Results ==
The whole Whig state ticket was elected. None of the incumbents ran for re-election this time.

The Canal Commissioners and Prison Inspectors, upon taking office, were classified by drawing lots, so that every following year one commissioner and one inspector would be elected to a three-year term. Cook and Gedney drew the one-year term, Hinds and Comstock the two-year term, and Beach and Spencer the three-year term.

24 Whigs and 8 Democrats were elected to a two-year term (1848–1849) in the New York State Senate.

93 Whigs and 35 Democrats were elected to the New York State Assembly of the 71st New York State Legislature.

1847 state election results
Office	Whig ticket		Democratic ticket		Anti-Rent ticket		Liberty ticket		National Reform ticket
Lieutenant Governor	Hamilton Fish	170,072	Nathan Dayton	139,623	Charles O. Shepard	8,518	Charles O. Shepard	4,911	Hugh T. Brooks
Secretary of State	Christopher Morgan	169,470	Edward Sanford	144,133	Edward Sanford				
Comptroller	Millard Fillmore	174,756	Orville Hungerford	136,027	Millard Fillmore				
Attorney General	Ambrose L. Jordan	174,763	Levi S. Chatfield	139,481	Ambrose L. Jordan				
Treasurer	Alvah Hunt	169,422	George W. Cuyler	145,966	George W. Cuyler				
State Engineer	Charles B. Stuart	173,003	Orville W. Childs	134,944	Charles B. Stuart				
Canal Commissioners	Charles Cook	169,860	John C. Mather	147,124	John C. Mather				
	Jacob Hinds	175,095	Elisha B. Smith	139,395	Jacob Hinds				
	Nelson J. Beach	174,948	Frederick Follett	139,217	Nelson J. Beach				
Inspector of State Prisons	John B. Gedney		Norman B. Smith						
	Isaac N. Comstock		George Caldwell						
	David D. Spencer		John Fisher						

== Sources ==
- Result for Lt. Gov. in Manual of the Corporation of the City of New York, 1852, p. 367)
- Results in The Whig Almanac and United States Register 1848

== See also ==
- New York gubernatorial elections
- New York state elections
