= Calvin T. Chamberlain =

American politician

Calvin Tibbetts Chamberlain (December 5, 1795 in Mount Vernon, then in Lincoln County, Massachusetts, now in Kennebec County, Maine – June 27, 1878 in Cuba, Allegany County, New York) was an American politician from New York.

== Life ==
He was the son of Benjamin Chamberlain (1757–1847) and Tryphena (née Tibbetts, widowed Kenney) Chamberlain. In 1816, he removed to a place then located in the Town of Friendship, about two miles from a settlement which was later incorporated as the Village of Cuba, in Allegany County. The next year, he established a saw mill there. He married Betsey Moore (d. 1845). In 1835, he opened a public house and general store, and was appointed Postmaster of Cuba.

He was a member of the New York State Assembly (Allegany Co.) in 1836 and 1837.

He was a member of the New York State Senate (6th D.) from 1843 to 1846, sitting in the 66th, 67th, 68th and 69th New York State Legislatures. On May 14, 1846, he married Sarah (Russell) Waters.

He was a brigadier general of the New York State Militia.

== Sources ==
- The New York Civil List compiled by Franklin Benjamin Hough (pages 134f, 139, 217, 219 and 264; Weed, Parsons and Co., 1858)
- History of the Pioneer Settlement of Phelps and Gorham's Purchase by O. Turner (Rochester NY, 1852; pg. 557f)
- Table of the Post Offices in the United States (1836; pg. 38)
- Manual for the Use of the Legislature (1865; pg. 400)
- Calvin T. Chamberlain at Gen Forum

New York State Assembly
Preceded by Alvin Burr	New York State Assembly; Allegany Co. 1836–1837 with Azel Fitch in 1837	Succeeded by Seth H. Pratt, Samuel Russell
New York State Senate
Preceded by Alvah Hunt	New York State Senate; Sixth District (Class 4); 1843–1846	Succeeded by Samuel H. P. Hall
