= Matthew West (politician) =

American politician (1801–1880)

Matthew West (1801 - March 26, 1880) was an American politician.

From Seneca County, New York, West served in the New York State Assembly in 1843. He lived in Winnebago County, Wisconsin from 1850 until his death on March 26, 1880, at the age of seventy-nine.
