= Thomas B. Mitchell =

American politician

Thomas B. Mitchell (died 1876) was an American lawyer and politician from New York.

== Life ==
He practiced law in Canajoharie.

He was a member of the New York State Senate (6th D.) from 1843 to 1846, sitting in the 66th, 67th, 68th and 69th New York State Legislatures. He was a delegate to the 1844 Democratic National Convention in Baltimore.

Afterwards he removed to Schenectady. He was Tempoarary Chairman of the Hard-Shell Democratic state convention, held in July 1854 at Syracuse.

Congressman William Mitchell (1807–1865) was his brother.

== Sources ==
- The New York Civil List compiled by Franklin Benjamin Hough (pages 134f and 143; Weed, Parsons and Co., 1858)
- THE ADAMANTINE CONVENTION in NYT on July 13, 1854

New York State Senate
Preceded by Bethuel Peck	New York State Senate; Fourth District (Class 4); 1843–1846	Succeeded by Thomas Crook
