= James Faulkner (Livingston County, New York) =

American politician

James Faulkner (January 21, 1790 in Cambridge, Washington County, New York – October 19, 1884 in Dansville, Livingston County, New York) was an American medical doctor, manufacturer, banker and politician from New York.

== Life ==
He was the son of Samuel Faulkner (1765–1805) and Catherine (Phoenix) Faulkner (b. 1768). In 1796, his family removed to Dansville, then a settlement in the Town of Sparta, in Ontario County, now a village in the Town of North Dansville in Livingston County. In 1801, he and his father remove to Geneseo where his father died in 1805.

In 1807, Faulkner went to Painted Post to study medicine. In 1811, he was licensed to practice, and commenced the practice of medicine in Bath. On May 12, 1812, he married Minerva Hammond (1795–1855), and returned to Dansville. They had nine children, among them Assemblyman James Faulkner Jr. (b. 1833). He took part in the War of 1812 as an army surgeon. He was also a Justice of the Peace, Town Clerk, and for 26 years Postmaster of Dansville.

Faulkner was Supervisor of the Town of North Dansville from 1815 to 1821, and a member of the New York State Assembly (Livingston Co.) in 1825 and 1826. In 1835, he was appointed an associate judge of the Livingston County Court.

He was a member of the New York State Senate (6th D.) from 1842 to 1845, sitting in the 65th, 66th, 67th and 68th New York State Legislatures.

He established paper mills, a tannery, grist mills and the First National Bank at Dansville. He was president of the bank from 1863 until his death.

== Sources ==
- The New York Civil List compiled by Franklin Benjamin Hough (pages 133ff, 140, 202, 204 and 273; Weed, Parsons and Co., 1858)
- Faulkner genealogy at RootsWeb
- Death of a Nonogenarian NY Times. October 24, 1884

New York State Senate
Preceded by Laurens Hull	New York State Senate; Sixth District (Class 3); 1842–1845	Succeeded by Thomas J. Wheeler
