= Carlos Emmons (politician) =

American politician

Carlos Emmons (June 17, 1799 Hartland, Windsor County, Vermont – December 12, 1875 Springville, Erie County, New York) was an American physician and politician from New York.

== Life ==
He was the son of Seth Emmons (1768–1814) and Esther (Paine) Emmons (1768–1832).

He began to practice medicine in Springville in 1823. He married Harriet Eaton, and they had three daughters.

He entered politics as a Whig, and in 1856 joined the Republican Party. He was a member of the New York State Assembly (Erie Co.) in 1834 and 1841.

He was a member of the New York State Senate (8th D.) from 1845 to 1847, sitting in the 68th, 69th and 70th New York State Legislatures.

On October 21, 1847, he married Caroline Wiltse (b. 1812), and their daughter was Kate Lucia (Emmons) Cummings (1848–1925). He held the rank of Assistant Hospital Surgeon during the Civil War. He was buried at the Maplewood Cemetery in Springville.

== Sources ==
- The New York Civil List compiled by Franklin Benjamin Hough (pages 135f, 140, 215, 224 and 272; Weed, Parsons and Co., 1858)
- Emmons genealogy at RootsWeb

New York State Senate
Preceded by Samuel Works	New York State Senate; Eighth District (Class 2); 1845–1847	Succeeded by district abolished
