= 68th New York State Legislature =

New York state legislative session

←	67th	69th	→
- The Old State Capitol (1879)

Overview
- Legislative body: New York State Legislature
- Jurisdiction: New York, United States
- Term: January 1 – December 31, 1845

Senate
- Members: 32
- President: Lt. Gov. Addison Gardiner (D)
- Party control: Democratic (27-4-1)

Assembly
- Members: 128
- Speaker: Horatio Seymour (D)
- Party control: Democratic (67-45-16)

Sessions
- 1st: January 7 – May 14, 1845

The 68th New York State Legislature, consisting of the New York State Senate and the New York State Assembly, met from January 7 to May 14, 1845, during the first year of Silas Wright's governorship, in Albany.

== Background ==
Under the provisions of the New York Constitution of 1821, 32 Senators were elected on general tickets in eight senatorial districts for four-year terms. They were divided into four classes, and every year eight Senate seats came up for election. Assemblymen were elected countywide on general tickets to a one-year term, the whole Assembly being renewed annually.

On May 6, 1844, the Legislature enacted to reduce the number of canal commissioners from 6 to 4, and that the canal commissioners be elected statewide by popular ballot.

U.S. Senator Nathaniel P. Tallmadge (W) resigned his seat on June 17, 1844, to take office as Governor of the Wisconsin Territory. U.S. Senator Silas Wright (D) was elected Governor of New York, and resigned his seat on November 26, 1844. On November 30, Gov. William C. Bouck appointed Lt. Gov. Daniel S. Dickinson (D) and State Senator Henry A. Foster (D) to fill the two vacancies temporarily.

At this time there were two major political parties: the Democratic Party and the Whig Party. The Democratic Party was split into two factions: the "Barnburners" and the "Hunkers." The radical abolitionists appeared as the Liberty Party. In the First District, the American Republican Party nominated tickets for the Senate and Assembly. About this time the Anti-Rent War began, and the Anti-Renters cross-endorsed Whigs or Democrats, according to their opinion on the rent issue.

The Democratic state convention met on September 4 at Syracuse, and nominated U.S. Senator Silas Wright for governor, Addison Gardiner for lieutenant governor, and an electoral ticket pledged to James K. Polk.

The Whig state convention met on September 11 at Syracuse, and nominated Millard Fillmore for governor, Samuel J. Wilkin for lieutenant governor, and an electoral ticket pledged to Henry Clay.

== Elections ==
The 1844 New York state election was held on November 5. Silas Wright and Addison Gardiner were elected governor and lieutenant governor, and four Democrats were elected canal commissioners. Also the Democratic electoral ticket won, and New York's 36 votes were cast for James K. Polk and George M. Dallas.

State Senator Robert Denniston (2nd D.) was re-elected. George Folsom (1st D.), John P. Beekman (3rd D.), Augustus C. Hand (4th D.), Enoch B. Talcott (5th D.), George D. Beers (6th D.), Henry J. Sedgwick (7th D.) and Carlos Emmons (8th D.) were also elected to the Senate. Folsom was an American Republican, Emmons was a Whig, the other six were Democrats.

== Sessions ==
On January 6, the Democratic assemblymen met in caucus and nominated Horatio Seymour (Hunker) for Speaker with 35 votes against 30 for William C. Crain (Barnburner).

The Legislature met for the regular session at the Old State Capitol in Albany on January 7, 1845; and adjourned on May 14.

Horatio Seymour (D) was elected Speaker.

On January 18, the Legislature elected John A. Dix (Barnb.) to succeed Henry A. Foster (Hunk.) as U.S. Senator, to fill the vacancy caused by the resignation of Silas Wright; and Daniel S. Dickinson (Hunker) to succeed himself, to fill the vacancy caused by the resignation of U.S. Senator Nathaniel P. Tallmadge.

On February 3, the Legislature re-elected State Comptroller Azariah C. Flagg (D); and elected Nathaniel S. Benton (Hunker) to succeed Samuel Young (Barnb.) as Secretary of State; Benjamin Enos (Hunker) to succeed Thomas Farrington (Barnb.) as State Treasurer; John Van Buren (Barnb.) to succeed George P. Barker (D) as Attorney General; and Hugh Halsey (Barnb.) to succeed Nathaniel Jones (D) as Surveyor General.

On February 4, the Legislature re-elected U.S. Senator Daniel S. Dickinson (Hunker) to a six-year term beginning on March 4, 1845.

On May 13, an "Act recommending a Convention of the people of this State" was passed, calling for a convention to amend the State Constitution. This bill had been debated throughout the whole session, and was finally approved by the votes of the Barnburners, Whigs and American Republicans, against fierce opposition of the Hunkers.

== State Senate ==
=== Districts ===
- The First District (4 seats) consisted of Kings, New York and Richmond counties.
- The Second District (4 seats) consisted of Dutchess, Orange, Putnam, Queens, Rockland, Suffolk, Sullivan, Ulster and Westchester counties.
- The Third District (4 seats) consisted of Albany, Columbia, Delaware, Greene, Rensselaer, Schenectady and Schoharie counties.
- The Fourth District (4 seats) consisted of Clinton, Essex, Franklin, Fulton, Hamilton, Herkimer, Montgomery, St. Lawrence, Saratoga, Warren and Washington counties.
- The Fifth District (4 seats) consisted of Jefferson, Lewis, Madison, Oneida, Oswego and Otsego counties.
- The Sixth District (4 seats) consisted of Allegany, Broome, Cattaraugus, Chemung, Chenango, Livingston, Steuben, Tioga and Tompkins counties.
- The Seventh District (4 seats) consisted of Cayuga, Cortland, Onondaga, Ontario, Seneca, Wayne and Yates counties.
- The Eighth District (4 seats) consisted of Chautauqua, Erie, Genesee, Monroe, Niagara, Orleans and Wyoming counties.
Note: There are now 62 counties in the State of New York. The counties which are not mentioned in this list had not yet been established, or sufficiently organized, the area being included in one or more of the abovementioned counties.

=== Members ===
The asterisk (*) denotes members of the previous Legislature who continued in office as members of this Legislature.

District	Senators	Term left	Party	Notes
First	Isaac L. Varian*	1 year	Democrat	
First	John A. Lott*	2 years	Democrat/Hunker	
First	David R. Floyd-Jones*	3 years	Democrat/Hunker	
First	George Folsom	4 years	American Republican	
Second	Abraham Bockee*	1 year	Democrat	
Second	Abraham A. Deyo*	2 years	Democrat/Barnburner	
Second	Joshua B. Smith*	3 years	Democrat	
Second	Robert Denniston*	4 years	Democrat	
Third	Erastus Corning*	1 year	Democrat/Hunker	
Third	John C. Wright*	2 years	Democrat	
Third	Stephen C. Johnson*	3 years	Democrat/Barnburner	
Third	John P. Beekman	4 years	Democrat	
Fourth	Edmund Varney*	1 year	Democrat/Barnburner	
Fourth	Thomas B. Mitchell*	2 years	Democrat/Hunker	
Fourth	Orville Clark*	3 years	Democrat/Hunker	
Fourth	Augustus C. Hand	4 years	Democrat	
Fifth	George C. Sherman*	1 year	Democrat/Barnburner	
Fifth	Carlos P. Scovil*	2 years	Democrat	
Fifth	Thomas Barlow*	3 years	Democrat/Barnburner	also First Judge of the Madison County Court
Fifth	Enoch B. Talcott	4 years	Democrat/Barnburner	
Sixth	James Faulkner*	1 year	Democrat	
Sixth	Calvin T. Chamberlain*	2 years	Democrat	
Sixth	Clark Burnham*	3 years	Democrat	
Sixth	George D. Beers	4 years	Democrat	
Seventh	William Bartlit*	1 year	Democrat/Hunker	
Seventh	John Porter*	2 years	Democrat	
Seventh	Albert Lester*	3 years	Democrat	
Seventh	Henry J. Sedgwick	4 years	Democrat/Barnburner	
Eighth	Gideon Hard*	1 year	Whig	
Eighth	Harvey Putnam*	2 years	Whig	
Eighth	Frederick F. Backus*	3 years	Whig	
Eighth	Carlos Emmons	4 years	Whig	

=== Employees ===
- Clerk: Isaac R. Elwood
- Deputy Clerk: Hiram Leonard
- Sergeant-at-Arms: Charles Niven, until February 1
  - Charles Bryan, from February 1
- Doorkeeper: Jared S. Halsey
- Assistant Doorkeeper: Martin Miller
- Janitor: Burgess Wands
- Messengers: John H. Finigan, Joseph Courtney Jr.

== State Assembly ==
=== Districts ===
- Albany County (3 seats)
- Allegany County (2 seats)
- Broome County (1 seat)
- Cattaraugus County (2 seats)
- Cayuga County (3 seats)
- Chautauqua County (3 seats)
- Chemung County (1 seat)
- Chenango County (3 seats)
- Clinton County (1 seat)
- Columbia County (3 seats)
- Cortland County (2 seats)
- Delaware County (2 seats)
- Dutchess County (3 seats)
- Erie County (3 seats)
- Essex County (1 seat)
- Franklin County (1 seat)
- Fulton and Hamilton counties (1 seat)
- Genesee County (2 seats)
- Greene County (2 seats)
- Herkimer County (2 seats)
- Jefferson County (3 seats)
- Kings County (2 seats)
- Lewis County (1 seat)
- Livingston County (2 seats)
- Madison County (3 seats)
- Monroe County (3 seats)
- Montgomery County (2 seats)
- The City and County of New York (13 seats)
- Niagara County (2 seats)
- Oneida County (4 seats)
- Onondaga County (4 seats)
- Ontario County (3 seats)
- Orange County (3 seats)
- Orleans County (1 seat)
- Oswego County (2 seats)
- Otsego County (3 seats)
- Putnam County (1 seat)
- Queens County (1 seat)
- Rensselaer County (3 seats)
- Richmond County (1 seat)
- Rockland County (1 seat)
- St. Lawrence County (2 seats)
- Saratoga County (2 seats)
- Schenectady County (1 seat)
- Schoharie County (2 seats)
- Seneca County (1 seat)
- Steuben County (3 seats)
- Suffolk County (2 seats)
- Sullivan County (1 seat)
- Tioga County (1 seat)
- Tompkins County (2 seats)
- Ulster County (2 seats)
- Warren County (1 seat)
- Washington (2 seats)
- Wayne County (2 seats)
- Westchester County (2 seats)
- Wyoming County (2 seats)
- Yates County (1 seat)
Note: There are now 62 counties in the State of New York. The counties which are not mentioned in this list had not yet been established, or sufficiently organized, the area being included in one or more of the abovementioned counties.

=== Assemblymen ===
The asterisk (*) denotes members of the previous Legislature who continued as members of this Legislature.

Party affiliations follow the statement given by the Schenectady Cabinet.

District	Assemblymen	Party	Notes
Albany	Clarkson F. Crosby	Whig	
Albany	Ira Harris	Whig/Anti-Rent	
Albany	Leonard Litchfield	Whig	
Allegany	Nathaniel Coe*	Whig	
Allegany	John G. Collins	Whig	
Broome	Cyrus Johnson	Whig	
Cattaraugus	Seth Field	Whig	
Cattaraugus	Roderick White	Whig	
Cayuga	David Gould	Democrat	
Cayuga	Leonard Searing	Democrat	
Cayuga	William Titus	Democrat	
Chautauqua	Samuel A. Brown	Whig	
Chautauqua	Henry C. Frisbee	Whig	
Chautauqua	Jeremiah Mann	Whig	
Chemung	Patrick McKey	Democrat	
Chenango	Joel Burdick	Democrat	
Chenango	Solomon S. Hall	Democrat	
Chenango	Charles B. Miller	Democrat	
Clinton	Noyes P. Gregory	Democrat	
Columbia	Peter I. Bachman	Democrat	
Columbia	Elijah Bagg	Democrat	
Columbia	William M. Bunker	Democrat	
Cortland	George J. J. Barber	Whig	unsuccessfully contested by Abraham Acker (D)
Cortland	John Pierce 2d	Democrat	
Delaware	John McDonald	Democrat	
Delaware	Linus Porter	Democrat	
Dutchess	Epenetus Crosby	Whig	
Dutchess	Freeborn Garretson	Whig	
Dutchess	Walter Sherman	Whig	
Erie	John T. Bush	Whig	
Erie	Truman Dewey	Whig	
Erie	Daniel Lee*	Whig	
Essex	John T. Hammond	Whig	
Franklin	Hiram Horton	Whig	
Fulton and Hamilton	Garret A. Newkirk	Democrat	
Genesee	Chester Hannum*	Whig	
Genesee	Aaron Long	Whig	
Greene	Deliverance B. Hervey	Democrat	
Greene	Gerret W. Sager	Democrat	
Herkimer	Alexander H. Buell	Democrat	
Herkimer	William C. Crain	Democrat/Barnburner	
Jefferson	Lysander H. Brown	Democrat	
Jefferson	Azel W. Danforth	Democrat	
Jefferson	Edward S. Salisbury	Democrat	
Kings	Richard L. Wyckoff	American Republican	
Kings	Daniel D. Wynant	American Republican	
Lewis	Dean S. Howard	Democrat	
Livingston	Harlow W. Wells	Whig	
Livingston	John Young	Whig	
Madison	Stephen G. Sears	Democrat	
Madison	William Smith	Democrat	
Madison	John I. Walrath	Democrat	
Monroe	William C. Bloss	Whig	
Monroe	John McVean	Whig	
Monroe	Isaac T. Raymond	Whig	
Montgomery	John L. Bevens	Democrat	
Montgomery	Peter H. Fonda	Democrat	
New York	Eli C. Blake	American Republican	
New York	John Culver	American Republican	
New York	John J. R. De Puy	American Republican	
New York	Jacob L. Fenn	American Republican	
New York	Harvey Hunt	American Republican	
New York	James Jarvis	American Republican	
New York	Frederick E. Mather	American Republican	
New York	Roderick N. Morrison	American Republican	
New York	Severn D. Moulton	American Republican	
New York	Thomas H. Oakley	American Republican	
New York	William S. Ross	American Republican	
New York	Abraham G. Thompson Jr.	American Republican	
New York	David E. Wheeler	American Republican	
Niagara	Levi F. Bowne	Whig	
Niagara	John Sweeney*	Whig	
Oneida	Andrew Billings	Democrat	
Oneida	Merit Brooks	Democrat	
Oneida	Calvert Comstock	Democrat	
Oneida	Horatio Seymour*	Democrat/Hunker	elected Speaker
Onondaga	Julius C. Kinne	Democrat	
Onondaga	Dennis McCarthy	Democrat	
Onondaga	David Preston	Democrat	
Onondaga	Lake I. Tefft	Democrat	
Ontario	Timothy Buel Jr.	Whig	
Ontario	Israel Huntington*	Whig	
Ontario	Alvah Worden	Whig	
Orange	John Brooks	Democrat	
Orange	Thornton M. Niven	Democrat	
Orange	Richard M. Tuthill Jr.	Democrat	
Orleans	Gardner Goold	Whig	
Oswego	Thomas Skelton	Democrat	
Oswego	Luny Thayer	Democrat	
Otsego	Franklin B. Carpenter	Democrat/Barnburner	
Otsego	Christopher D. Fellows	Democrat	
Otsego	Harry G. Harden	Democrat/Barnburner	
Putnam	Benjamin Bailey	Democrat	
Queens	Elbert Floyd-Jones	Democrat	
Rensselaer	Harry Betts	Whig/Anti-Rent	
Rensselaer	Ryer Heermance	Whig/Anti-Rent	
Rensselaer	William H. Van Schoonhoven	Whig/Anti-Rent	
Richmond	Peter Mersereau	American Republican	
Rockland	Joseph P. Brower	Democrat	
St. Lawrence	Asa L. Hazelton	Democrat	
St. Lawrence	John L. Russell	Democrat	
Saratoga	Edward Edwards	Whig	
Saratoga	William Wilcox	Whig	
Schenectady	William Gifford	Whig	
Schoharie	Seymour Boughton	Democrat/Anti-Rent	
Schoharie	Henry Tibbets	Whig/Anti-Rent	
Seneca	Robert L. Stevenson	Democrat	
Steuben	William C. Rogers	Democrat	
Steuben	Ansel C. Smith	Democrat	
Steuben	Jacob Van Valkenburgh	Democrat	
Suffolk	John H. Dayton	Democrat	also Collector of Customs at Sag Harbor
Suffolk	Darling B. Whitney	Democrat	
Sullivan	Harvey R. Morris	Democrat	
Tioga	Gideon O. Chase	Democrat	
Tompkins	Sherman Miller	Democrat	
Tompkins	Lyman Strobridge	Democrat	
Ulster	Reuben H. Hine	Democrat	
Ulster	Irwin Pardee	Democrat	
Warren	James Cameron	Democrat	
Washington	James Rice	Whig	
Washington	John Stevenson	Whig	
Wayne	John J. Dickson	Democrat	
Wayne	Alanson M. Knapp	Democrat	
Westchester	J. Anthony Constant	Democrat	
Westchester	Thomas R. Lee	Democrat	
Wyoming	Leverett Spring	Whig	
Wyoming	Andrew W. Young	Whig	
Yates	Ezekiel Casner	Whig	

=== Employees ===
- Clerk: James R. Rose
- Sergeant-at-Arms: David B. Grout
- Doorkeeper: Elbridge B. Fenn
- Assistant Doorkeeper: Israel B. Neahr
- Second Assistant Doorkeeper: Isaac C. Sheldon

== Sources ==
- The New York Civil List compiled by Franklin Benjamin Hough (Weed, Parsons and Co., 1858) [pg. 109 and 441 for Senate districts; pg. 134f for senators; pg. 148f for Assembly districts; pg. 230f for assemblymen; pg. 322 and 330 for presidential election]
- Political History of the State of New York from January 1, 1841, to January 1, 1847, Vol III, including the Life of Silas Wright (Hall & Dickson, Syracuse NY, 1848; pg. 503 to 570)
- Journal of the Senate (68th Session) (1845)
- The Anti-Rent Era in New York Law and Politics 1839 to 1865 by Charles W. McCurdy (The University of South Carolina Press, 2001; pg. 162 and 362)
