= Oren R. Earl =

American politician

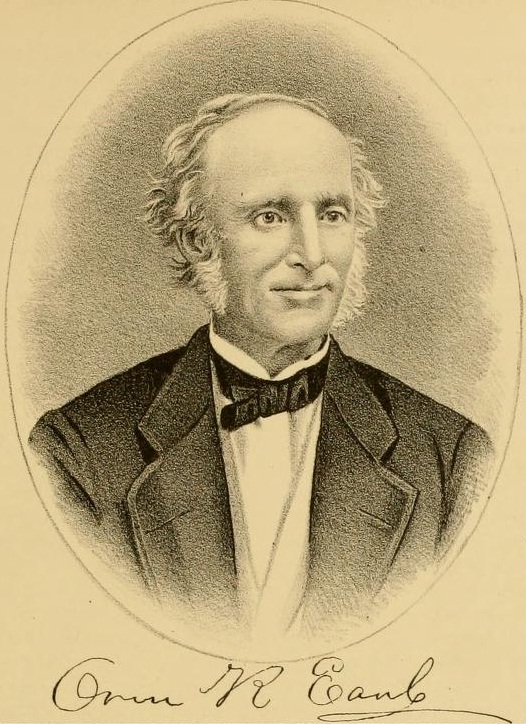
Oren R. Earl (1877)

Oren R. Earl (November 2, 1813 – January 15, 1901) was an American farmer, businessman, banker and politician from New York.

== Life ==
He was born on November 2, 1813, in Ellisburg, Jefferson County, New York, the son of Pardon Earl (died 1844) and Nancy (Sherman) Earl (died 1825). He worked on the family farm until 1844 when he bought a farm for himself in the Town of Sandy Creek, located about a mile north of the Village of Sandy Creek, in Oswego County. On June 20, 1845, he married Jennett Salisbury. From 1857 to 1868, he ran a tannery. Then he was vice President of the Syracuse Northern Railroad, and in 1870 he opened the first bank in Sandy Creek.

Earl entered politics as a Whig, and in 1856 became a Republican. He was Supervisor of the Town of Sandy Creek in 1845 and 1846; a member of the New York State Assembly in 1847; and again Supervisor of Sandy Creek from 1850 to 1855, in 1863 and 1864, and from 1869 to 1871.

He died on January 11, 1901, at his home in Sandy Creek; and was buried at the Woodlawn Cemetery there.
