= William H. Van Schoonhoven =

American lawyer and politician

William Henry Van Schoonhoven (January 5, 1810 Waterford, Saratoga County, New York – January 16, 1855 Troy, Rensselaer County, New York) was an American lawyer and politician from New York.

== Life ==
He was the son of Jacobus (or James) Van Schoonhoven (1781–1865) and Alida (Lansing) Van Schoonhoven (1789–1824). The family moved to Troy around 1820 when Jacobus Van Schoonhoven took up the position of Cashier of the Farmers' Bank of Troy.

William H. Van Schoonhoven graduated from Union College in 1829. Then he studied law and was admitted to the bar. On September 1, 1834, he married Margaret Brinkerhoff (1818–1897), and their daughter was Phoebe Van Schoonhoven (1838–1923).

He was a member of the New York State Assembly (Rensselaer Co.) in 1840, 1841 and 1845.

He was a member of the New York State Senate (3rd D.) in 1846 and 1847; and a delegate to the New York State Constitutional Convention of 1846.

He was again a member of the State Senate (12th D.) in 1852 and 1853.

State Senator Jacobus Van Schoonhoven (1744–1814) was his grandfather; State Senator Guert Van Schoonhoven (1765–1847) was his uncle. Julia Thorne (1944–2006), the first wife of U.S. Senator John Kerry, was a great-great-granddaughter of Phoebe Van Schoonhoven (1838–1923).

== Sources ==
- The New York Civil List compiled by Franklin Benjamin Hough (pages 59, 135, 137, 147, 224f, 231 and 312; Weed, Parsons and Co., 1858)
- Death notice in The Country Gentleman (issue of January 25, 1855; pg. 65)
- Van Schoonhoven genealogy at Schenectady History
- Van Schoonhoven genealogy at RootsWeb

New York State Senate
Preceded by Erastus Corning	New York State Senate; Third District (Class 3); 1846 – 1847	Succeeded by district abolished
Preceded by Thomas B. Carroll	New York State Senate; Twelfth District; 1852 – 1853	Succeeded by Elisha N. Pratt
