= Harvey R. Morris =

American politician

Harvey R. Morris (February 27, 1807 – November 17, 1886) was an American politician from New York.

== Life ==
He married Catherine Miller (1815–1844) who "was killed by being thrown from a wagon." He then married Elizabeth Banks (1821–1904), and they had several children.

He was a member of the New York State Assembly (Sullivan Co.) in 1845; and a member of the New York State Senate (2nd D.) in 1847.

He was Postmaster of Wurtsboro, New York during the Franklin Pierce administration.

== Sources ==
- The New York Civil List compiled by Franklin Benjamin Hough (pages 135, 143, 231 and 293; Weed, Parsons and Co., 1858)
- Post Office Directory (1857; pg. 122)
- Sylvan Cemetery, Wurtsboro records

New York State Senate
| Preceded by Abraham A. Deyo | New York State Senate; Second District (Class 4); 1847 | Succeeded by district abolished |
