= Joshua B. Smith =

American politician (1801–1860)

Joshua Brewster Smith (February 9, 1801 – June 17, 1860) was an American politician from New York.

== Life ==
He was the son of State Senator Joshua Smith (1763–1845) and Deborah Smith (1771–1809), and was born and died at the family estate in the Smithtown section of Hauppauge. He married Mary Rogers (1808–1878), and they had seven children, six of whom died in infancy.

He was a member of the New York State Assembly (Suffolk Co.) in 1839 and 1843.

He was a member of the New York State Senate (2nd D.) from 1844 to 1847, sitting in the 67th, 68th, 69th and 70th New York State Legislatures.

He was again a member of the State Senate (1st D.) in 1858 and 1859.

He was buried at the Hauppauge Rural Cemetery.

== Sources ==
- The New York Civil List compiled by Franklin Benjamin Hough (pages 134f, 145, 222, 228, 305 and 435; Weed, Parsons and Co., 1858)
- Joshua B. Smith at Long Island Surnames

New York State Senate
Preceded by John Hunter	New York State Senate; Second District (Class 1); 1844–1847	Succeeded by district abolished
Preceded by James Rider	New York State Senate; 1st District; 1858–1859	Succeeded by Edward A. Lawrence
