= Ogdensburg, Clayton and Rome Railroad =

Ogdensburg, Clayton and Rome Railroad was founded to compete with the Black River and Utica on April 7, 1853. Both railroads were to head from their respective cities north to Boonville. From there, the BR&U took the low route and the OC&R took the high route. Everyone was agreed that the region could support only one railroad, and before either railroad could be completed, the Civil War intervened. No portion of the OC&R was completed, but grading was commenced at various points. By 1856, work was suspended, and the company lost its charter in 1859.

== Route ==
The chosen route is generally known to have been up the Lansing Kill Gorge to Boonville, then west of the Black River up to Carthage. Very little of it is known to have been built. Some cuts were blasted out north of Houseville, which were later reused by the Glenfield and Western Railroad. In Lansing Kill Gorge there can be found a "long embankment running across the Nightingale farm below Dunn Brook." Near Pixley Falls Park may be found the remains of a tunnel. A portion of embankment is on the property of the Happy Hollow Campground between Lowville and Castorland. These are the only documented portions, but there may be many more hiding in the woods and fields of the Tug Hill Plateau.
