= William Ruger (politician) =

American politician

William Ruger (died May 21, 1843) was an American lawyer and politician from New York.

== Life ==
About 1828, he opened a select school in Watertown, New York, and taught mathematics there. He published A New System of Arithmeticks (on-line copy; 1836; 264 pages). He also studied law, and was admitted to the bar in 1831. He practiced law in partnership with Charles Mason from 1835 to 1838.

Ruger was a member of the New York State Senate (5th D.) in 1842 and 1843.

Chief Judge William C. Ruger (1824–1892) was his nephew.

== Sources ==
- The New York Civil List compiled by Franklin Benjamin Hough (pages 133f and 145; Weed, Parsons and Co., 1858)

New York State Senate
Preceded by Avery Skinner	New York State Senate; Fifth District (Class 3); 1842–1843	Succeeded by George C. Sherman
