= James G. Hopkins =

American politician

James G. Hopkins (June 15, 1801 – July 6, 1860) was an American lawyer and politician from New York.

== Life ==
He lived in Ogdensburg, New York. He married Elizabeth Rosseel (1813–1864). He was Clerk of St. Lawrence County from 1826 to 1831.

He was a Whig member of the New York State Senate (4th D.) from 1840 to 1843, sitting in the 63rd, 64th, 65th and 66th New York State Legislatures.

He was Secretary of the Northern Railroad Company.

He died while on vacation at Saratoga Springs, New York, and was buried at the Ogdensburg Cemetery.

== Sources ==
- The New York Civil List compiled by Franklin Benjamin Hough (pages 132ff, 142 and 393; Weed, Parsons and Co., 1858)
- American Railroad Journal (issue of November 11, 1848; pg. 725)

New York State Senate
| Preceded by David Spraker | New York State Senate; Fourth District (Class 1); 1840–1843 | Succeeded by Orville Clark |
