= Frederick F. Backus =

American physician and politician

Frederick Fanning Backus (June 15, 1794 Bethlehem, Litchfield County, Connecticut – November 4, 1858 Rochester, Monroe County, New York) was an American medical doctor and politician from New York.

== Life ==
He was the son of Rev. Azel Backus D.D. (1765–1817?), the first President of Hamilton College, and Mellicent (Deming) Backus (1766–1853). He graduated from Yale College in 1813. Then he studied medicine with Dr. Eli Ives in New Haven, received a medical degree, and commenced the practice of medicine in Rochester in 1816. In 1818, he married Rebecca A. Fitzhugh (1791–1869), daughter of William Fitzhugh (1761–1839), one of the founders of Rochester, and they had five children.

He was a member of the New York State Senate (8th D.) from 1844 to 1847, sitting in the 67th, 68th, 69th and 70th New York State Legislature.

He died in 1858, after a series of strokes. He was buried at the Mount Hope Cemetery, Rochester.

His sister Wealtha Ann Backus (1800–1819) was the first wife of abolitionist Gerrit Smith (1797–1874). Canal Commissioner Henry Fitzhugh (1801–1866) was a brother of Backus's wife Rebecca and of Gerrit Smith's second wife, Ann Carroll Fitzhugh (1805–1879). Another sister of Rebecca's, Elizabeth Potts Fitzhugh, was the second wife of abolitionist James G. Birney.

His son Gerrit Smith Backus (1825-1877) was one of Peru's chief engineers starting in 1861; he was highly notable in Peru at the time. His specialty was mountain rail location.

== Notes ==
New York State Senate
Preceded by Abram Dixon	New York State Senate; Eighth District (Class 1); 1844 – 1847	Succeeded by district abolished
