= Jacob Hinds =

American politician

Jacob Hinds (c. 1800 – October 20, 1873) was an American politician from New York.

== Life ==
In 1826, he married Almira Waldron (1805–1874), and they had five children, among them Franklin Hinds, Harrison Hinds, Mary Katherine Hinds (1832–1913) and Minerva A. Hinds (1830–1890).

Sometime around 1830, he moved to Murray, Orleans County, New York, and was among the founders of the village of Hindsburgh (now Hinsburg).

During the administration of Governor William H. Seward, he was appointed Superintendent of Canal Repairs for a section of the Erie Canal.

He was one of the first three Canal Commissioners elected under the New York State Constitution of 1846, and drew the three-year term, being in office from 1848 to 1850. In 1850, he was accused of misadministration, but defended himself successfully before a special committee of the New York State Legislature.

== Sources ==
- The New York Civil List compiled by Franklin Benjamin Hough (page 42; Weed, Parsons and Co., 1858) [gives "Tonawanda" as residence for Hinds]
- The New York Annual Register (1840; page 394)
- Reimbursement of his legal fees, in The Laws of the State of New York (Seventy-eighth Session, 1855; pages 1024f)
- The New York Mercantile Union Business Directory (1849; page 412) [gives "Hindsville" as residence for Hinds]
- The Pioneer History of Orleans County, NY, Chapter XXIV, The Village of Hindsburgh by Arad Thomas
- Burial records from Mt. Albion Cemetery, Albion NY, at RootsWeb
- Burial records from Transit Cemetery, Murray NY, at RootsWeb
- Waldron genealogy
