= Julius C. Hubbell =

American politician (1863–1949)

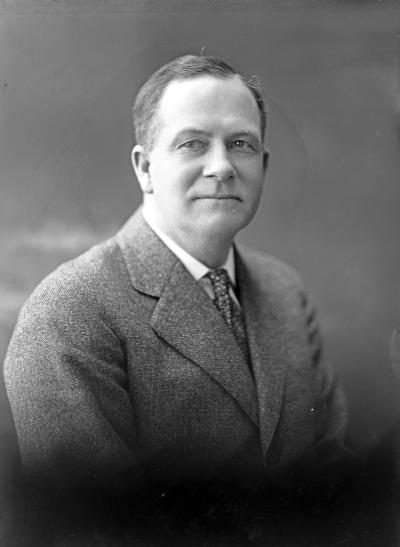
- Hubbell in 1917

Member of the Washington House of Representatives for the 19th district
- In office 1909–1933

Personal details
- Born: June 4, 1863 Chazy, New York, United States
- Died: October 17, 1949 (aged 86) Ellensburg, Washington, United States
- Party: Republican

Julius Caesar Hubbell (June 4, 1863 – October 17, 1949) was an American politician in the state of Washington. He served in the Washington House of Representatives from 1909 to 1933 for district 19.
