= Daniel S. Dickinson =

American politician and lawyer (1800–1866)

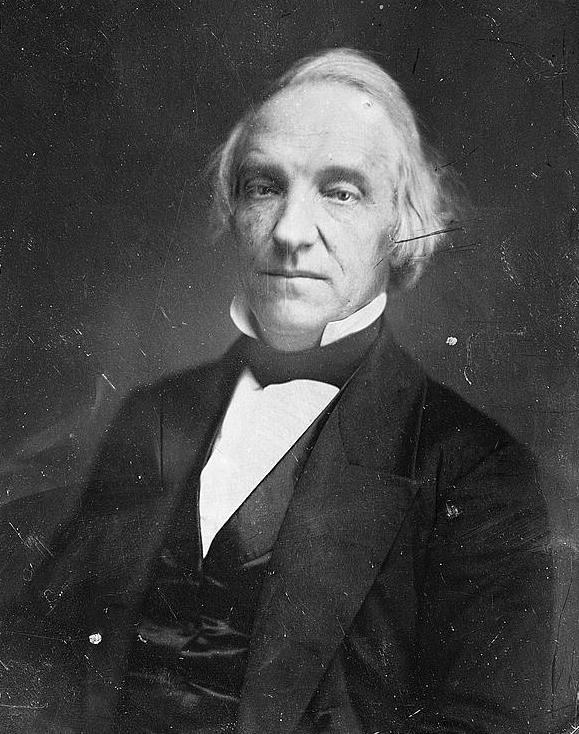
- Dickinson, c. 1844–1860

27th Attorney General of New York
- In office January 1, 1862 – December 31, 1863
- Governor: Edwin D. Morgan; Horatio Seymour
- Preceded by: Charles G. Myers
- Succeeded by: John Cochrane

United States Senator from New York
- In office November 30, 1844 – March 3, 1851
- Preceded by: Nathaniel P. Tallmadge
- Succeeded by: Hamilton Fish

Lieutenant Governor of New York
- In office January 1, 1843 – December 31, 1844
- Governor: William C. Bouck
- Preceded by: Luther Bradish
- Succeeded by: Addison Gardiner

Member of the New York State Senate from the Sixth District
- In office January 1, 1837 – December 31, 1840 Serving with Various (multiple member district)
- Preceded by: John F. Hubbard, Ebenezer Mack, Levi Beardsley, George Huntington
- Succeeded by: Laurens Hull, Alvah Hunt, Andrew B. Dickinson, Nehemiah Platt

Personal details
- Born: Daniel Stevens Dickinson; September 11, 1800 Goshen, Connecticut, U.S.
- Died: April 12, 1866 (aged 65) New York City, New York, U.S.
- Resting place: Spring Forest Cemetery; Binghamton, New York, U.S.
- Party: Democratic
- Spouse: Lydia Knapp (m. 1822)
- Children: 4
- Relatives: Tracy Dickinson Mygatt (great-granddaughter)

Daniel Stevens Dickinson (September 11, 1800 – April 12, 1866) was an American politician and lawyer, most notable as a United States senator from 1844 to 1851.

== Biography ==
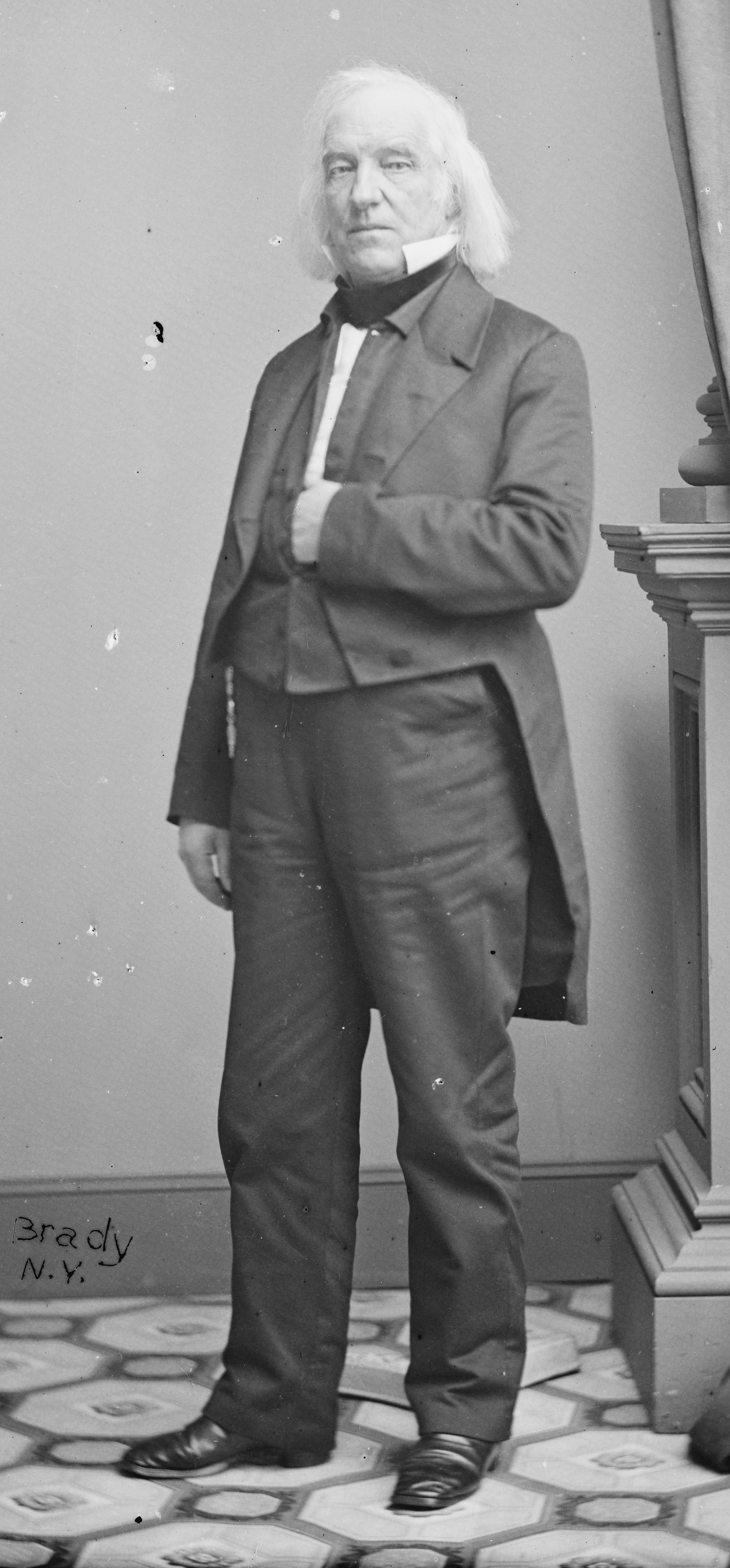
Daniel S. Dickinson

Born in Goshen, Connecticut, he moved with his parents to Guilford, Chenango County, New York, in 1806. He attended the common schools, was apprenticed to a clothier, and taught school at Wheatland, New York from 1821 on. In 1822, he married Lydia Knapp, with whom he had four children: Virginia, Manco, Lydia, and Mary; Virginia died at age 20 in 1846, and Manco in 1851. He also engaged in land surveying, studied law, and was admitted to the bar in 1828. He commenced practice in Guilford, and served as Postmaster of Guilford from 1827 to 1832. He moved to Binghamton, New York and served as its first Village President in 1834.

He was a member of the New York State Senate (6th D.) from 1837 to 1840, sitting in the 60th, 61st, 62nd and 63rd New York State Legislatures. He was Lieutenant Governor of New York from 1843 to 1844. In 1844, he was a presidential elector, voting for James K. Polk and George M. Dallas.

In 1844, he was appointed as a Democrat to the U.S. Senate to fill the vacancy caused by the resignation of Nathaniel P. Tallmadge, and was subsequently elected to a full term, holding office from November 30, 1844, to March 3, 1851. He was Chairman of the United States Senate Committee on Finance (1849–1850), a member of the Committee on Manufactures (Twenty-ninth and Thirtieth United States Congresses), and a member of the Committee on Private Land Claims (Thirty-first United States Congress). As a senator and after, Dickinson was the leader of the conservative Hunker faction of the New York Democratic Party, and would eventually become leader of the "Hards" who opposed reconciliation with the more radical Barnburner faction which had left the party in 1848 to join the Free Soilers. Dickinson resumed the practice of law in 1851. He was delegate to the 1852 Democratic National Convention, where, on the 48th ballot, after efforts to nominate Franklin Pierce had fallen short, Virginia dramatically switched its votes from Pierce to Dickinson. The enthusiastic reaction in the hall suggested that a delegate-stampede to Dickinson might have ensued, but Dickinson then addressed the convention and "eloquently withdrew his own name," enabling Pierce to obtain the nomination on the next ballot. In 1853, President Pierce appointed him as Collector of the Port of New York, but he declined to take office. In 1860, he supported John C. Breckinridge for president.

He supported the Union during the American Civil War. He was elected New York State Attorney General in November 1861 on a ticket nominated by the Independent People's state convention (War Democrats), and endorsed by the Republicans. He was appointed United States Commissioner for the final settlement of the Hudson Bay and Puget Sound agricultural claims in 1864.

Dickinson was considered as a possible vice presidential candidate when Abraham Lincoln ran for reelection in 1864 and desired a pro-war Democrat on the Republican ticket to demonstrate support for his war policy, but the nomination went to Andrew Johnson. Dickinson supported Lincoln's reelection, and was appointed United States Attorney for the Southern District of New York in 1865, an office in which he served until his death.

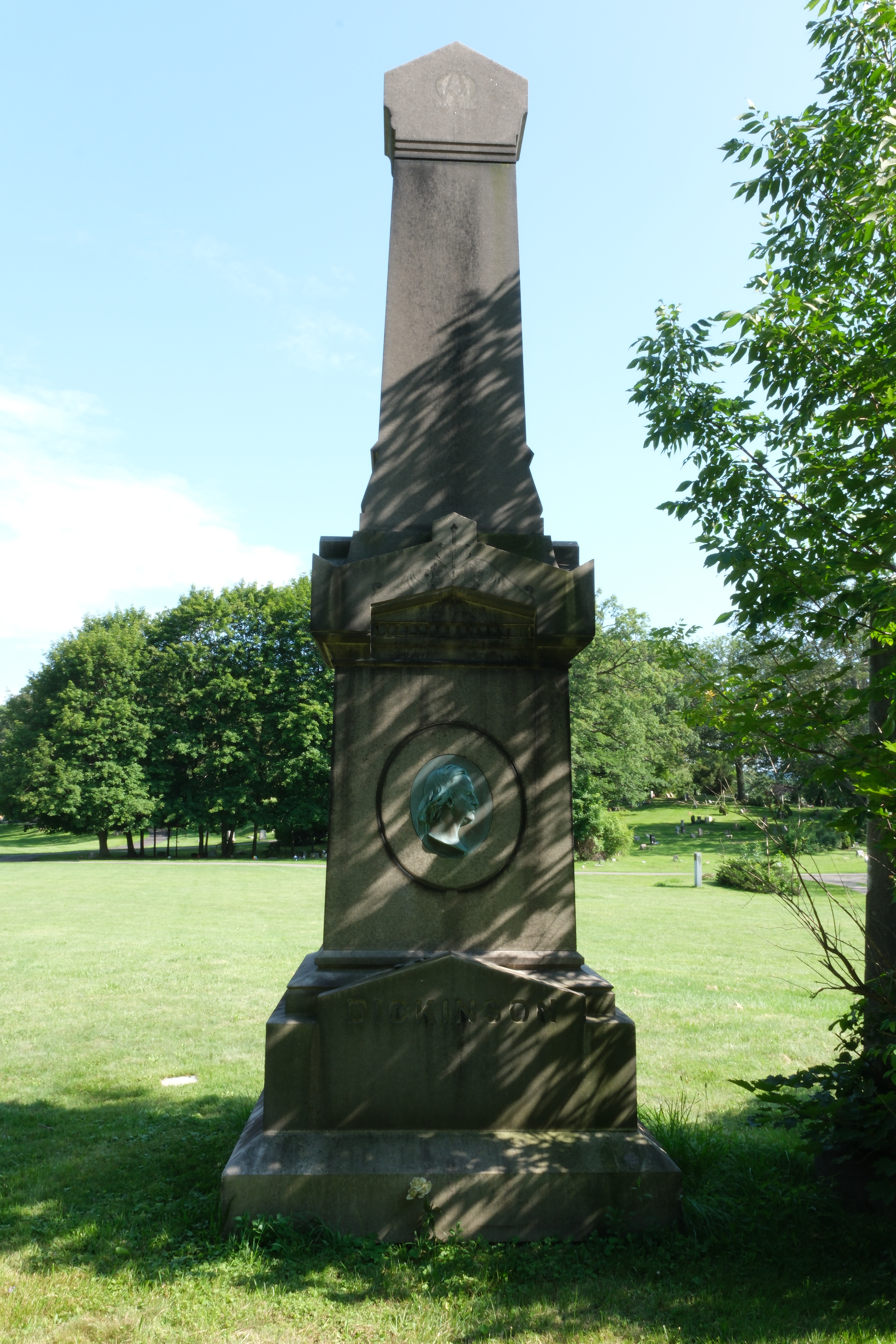
Grave of Dickinson in Spring Forest Cemetery

On April 12, 1866, Dickinson died suddenly in New York City at the residence of his son-in-law Samuel G. Courtney, and was buried at the Spring Forest Cemetery in Binghamton. His cause of death was reported as a hernia.

== Legacy ==
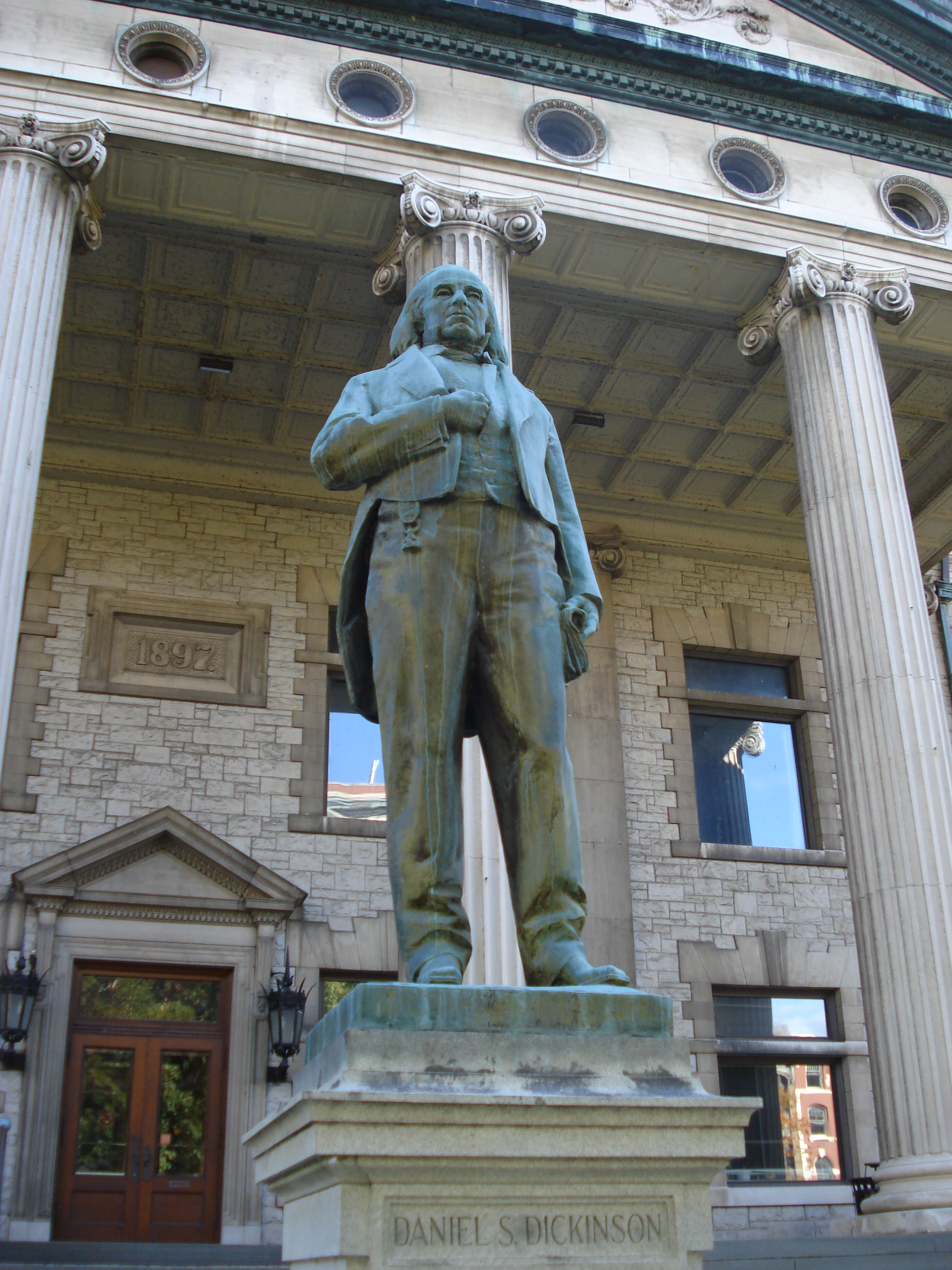
Statue of Dickinson at the Broome County Courthouse

Daniel S. Dickinson is the namesake of the village of Port Dickinson, New York (and the encompassing town), Dickinson County, Iowa, and Dickinson County, Kansas. Dickinson street in Binghamton is named after Dickinson. A bronze statue of Dickinson by Allen George Newman was erected in front of the Broome County Courthouse in Binghamton, New York in 1924.

His great-granddaughter Tracy Dickinson Mygatt was a Socialist playwright and pacifist.

== Notes ==
New York State Senate
Preceded by John F. Hubbard	New York State Senate; Sixth District (Class 2); 1837–1840	Succeeded by Nehemiah Platt
Political offices
Preceded by Luther Bradish	Lieutenant Governor of New York; 1843–1844	Succeeded by Addison Gardiner
U.S. Senate
Preceded by Nathaniel P. Tallmadge	U.S. senator (Class 1) from New York; 1844–1851; Served alongside: Henry A. Foster, John A. Dix and William H. Seward	Succeeded by Hamilton Fish
Preceded by Charles G. Atherton; New Hampshire	Chairman of the U.S. Senate Committee on Finance; 1849–1850	Succeeded by Robert M.T. Hunter; Virginia
Legal offices
Preceded by Charles G. Myers	New York Attorney General; 1862–1863	Succeeded by John Cochrane
