= 62nd New York State Legislature =

New York state legislative session

←	61st	63rd	→
- The Old State Capitol (1879)

Overview
- Legislative body: New York State Legislature
- Jurisdiction: New York, United States
- Term: January 1 – December 31, 1839

Senate
- Members: 32
- President: Lt. Gov. Luther Bradish (W)
- Party control: Democratic (18-14)

Assembly
- Members: 128
- Speaker: George W. Patterson (W)
- Party control: Whig (82-46)

Sessions
- 1st: January 1 – May 7, 1839

The 62nd New York State Legislature, consisting of the New York State Senate and the New York State Assembly, met from January 1 to May 7, 1839, during the first year of William H. Seward's governorship, in Albany.

== Background ==
Under the provisions of the New York Constitution of 1821, 32 Senators were elected on general tickets in eight senatorial districts for four-year terms. They were divided into four classes, and every year eight Senate seats came up for election. Assemblymen were elected countywide on general tickets to a one-year term, the whole Assembly being renewed annually.

In 1838, Fulton County was split from Montgomery County. Fulton and Hamilton counties were joined in one Assembly district and apportioned 1 seat, the remaining 2 seats of the previous Hamilton-Montgomery district were apportioned to the now smaller Montgomery County.

At this time there were two political parties: the Democratic Party and the Whig Party.

On September 12, 1838, the Whig state convention met at Utica, and nominated William H. Seward for Governor, and Speaker Luther Bradish for Lieutenant Governor. On the same day, the Democratic state convention met at Herkimer, and nominated Gov. William L. Marcy and Lt. Gov. John Tracy unanimously for re-election.

On October 3, 1838, a state convention of former Democrats met under the name of "Conservatives" (among them U.S. Senator Nathaniel P. Tallmadge) at Syracuse, and endorsed the Whig nominees Seward and Bradish.

== Elections ==
The State election was held from November 5 to 7, 1838. William H. Seward and Luther Bradish were elected Governor and Lieutenant Governor.

State Senator Chester Loomis (7th D.) was defeated for re-election.

1838 New York State Senate election result
District	Whig		Democrat	
First	Gabriel Furman	23,398	Minthorne Tompkins	22,731
Second	Ebenezer Lounsbery	23,256	Daniel Johnson	24,524
Third	Harvey Watson	24,516	Alonzo C. Paige	24,563
Fourth	Bethuel Peck	24,185	Hiram Barber	23,244
Fifth	Jonathan D. Ledyard	21,311	Joseph Clark	23,645
Sixth	Alvah Hunt	24,324	Ebenezer Mack	23,025
Seventh	Robert C. Nicholas	24,129	Chester Loomis	22,428
Eighth	Henry Hawkins	26,711	Addison Gardiner	17,360

== Sessions ==
The Legislature met for the regular session at the Old State Capitol in Albany on January 1, 1839; and the Assembly adjourned on May 6, the Senate on May 7.

On January 1, George W. Patterson (W) was elected Speaker. In the Senate, the mode of appointing the standing committees was changed. The committees had usually been appointed by the lieutenant governor (who is ex officio President of the Senate). At this session, the lieutenant governor was a member of the minority party, and the Democratic majority voted to appoint the committees by ballot.

On January 26, Canal Commissioner Stephen Van Rensselaer died.

On February 4, the Legislature elected John C. Spencer (W) to succeed John A. Dix (D) as Secretary of State; Bates Cooke (W) to succeed Azariah C. Flagg (D) as State Comptroller; Willis Hall (W) to succeed Samuel Beardsley (D) as Attorney General; and Jacob Haight (W) to succeed Gamaliel H. Barstow (W) as State Treasurer.

On February 5, the Legislature failed to elect a U.S. Senator to succeed Nathaniel P. Tallmadge, and the seat became vacant on March 4, 1839.

On February 18, the Legislature elected Samuel B. Ruggles (W) a Canal Commissioner, to fill the vacancy caused by the death of Van Rensselaer.

== State Senate ==
=== Districts ===
- The First District (4 seats) consisted of Kings, New York and Richmond counties.
- The Second District (4 seats) consisted of Dutchess, Orange, Putnam, Queens, Rockland, Suffolk, Sullivan, Ulster and Westchester counties.
- The Third District (4 seats) consisted of Albany, Columbia, Delaware, Greene, Rensselaer, Schenectady and Schoharie counties.
- The Fourth District (4 seats) consisted of Clinton, Essex, Franklin, Fulton, Hamilton, Herkimer, Montgomery, St. Lawrence, Saratoga, Warren and Washington counties.
- The Fifth District (4 seats) consisted of Jefferson, Lewis, Madison, Oneida, Oswego and Otsego counties.
- The Sixth District (4 seats) consisted of Allegany, Broome, Cattaraugus, Chemung, Chenango, Livingston, Steuben, Tioga and Tompkins counties.
- The Seventh District (4 seats) consisted of Cayuga, Cortland, Onondaga, Ontario, Seneca, Wayne and Yates counties.
- The Eighth District (4 seats) consisted of Chautauqua, Erie, Genesee, Monroe, Niagara and Orleans counties.
Note: There are now 62 counties in the State of New York. The counties which are not mentioned in this list had not yet been established, or sufficiently organized, the area being included in one or more of the abovementioned counties.

=== Members ===
The asterisk (*) denotes members of the previous Legislature who continued in office as members of this Legislature.

District	Senators	Term left	Party	Notes
First	Henry Floyd-Jones*	1 year	Democrat	resided in Queens Co., elected in the old 1st D.
First	Frederick A. Tallmadge*	2 years	Whig	
First	Gulian C. Verplanck*	3 years	Whig	
First	Gabriel Furman	4 years	Whig	
Second	John Hunter*	1 year	Democrat	
Second	Henry H. Van Dyck*	2 years	Democrat	
Second	Henry A. Livingston*	3 years	Whig	
Second	Daniel Johnson	4 years	Democrat	
Third	James Powers*	1 year	Democrat	
Third	Noadiah Johnson*	2 years	Democrat	died on April 4, 1839
Third	Edward P. Livingston*	3 years	Democrat	resigned on October 9, 1839
Third	Alonzo C. Paige	4 years	Democrat	
Fourth	David Spraker*	1 year	Democrat	
Fourth	Samuel Young*	2 years	Democrat	also a Canal Commissioner
Fourth	Martin Lee*	3 years	Whig	
Fourth	Bethuel Peck	4 years	Whig	
Fifth	Micah Sterling*	1 year	Democrat	
Fifth	David Wager*	2 years	Democrat	
Fifth	Avery Skinner*	3 years	Democrat	also Postmaster of Union Square
Fifth	Joseph Clark	4 years	Democrat	
Sixth	George Huntington*	1 year	Democrat	
Sixth	Daniel S. Dickinson*	2 years	Democrat	
Sixth	Laurens Hull*	3 years	Whig	
Sixth	Alvah Hunt	4 years	Whig	
Seventh	John Beardsley*	1 year	Democrat	
Seventh	Samuel L. Edwards*	2 years	Democrat	
Seventh	John Maynard*	3 years	Whig	
Seventh	Robert C. Nicholas	4 years	Whig	
Eighth	Chauncey J. Fox*	1 year	Whig	resided in Cattaraugus Co., elected in the old 8th D.
Eighth	Samuel Works*	2 years	Whig	
Eighth	William A. Moseley*	3 years	Whig	
Eighth	Henry Hawkins	4 years	Whig	

=== Employees ===
- Clerk: John F. Bacon
- Deputy Clerk: Chauncey Wasson
- Sergeant-at-Arms: James Livingston
- Doorkeeper: James D. Wasson

== State Assembly ==
=== Districts ===
- Albany County (3 seats)
- Allegany County (2 seats)
- Broome County (1 seat)
- Cattaraugus County (2 seats)
- Cayuga County (3 seats)
- Chautauqua County (3 seats)
- Chemung County (1 seat)
- Chenango County (3 seats)
- Clinton County (1 seat)
- Columbia County (3 seats)
- Cortland County (2 seats)
- Delaware County (2 seats)
- Dutchess County (3 seats)
- Erie County (3 seats)
- Essex County (1 seat)
- Franklin County (1 seat)
- Fulton and Hamilton counties (1 seat)
- Genesee County (4 seats)
- Greene County (2 seats)
- Herkimer County (2 seats)
- Jefferson County (3 seats)
- Kings County (2 seats)
- Lewis County (1 seat)
- Livingston County (2 seats)
- Madison County (3 seats)
- Monroe County (3 seats)
- Montgomery County (2 seats)
- The City and County of New York (13 seats)
- Niagara County (2 seats)
- Oneida County (4 seats)
- Onondaga County (4 seats)
- Ontario County (3 seats)
- Orange County (3 seats)
- Orleans County (1 seat)
- Oswego County (2 seats)
- Otsego County (3 seats)
- Putnam County (1 seat)
- Queens County (1 seat)
- Rensselaer County (3 seats)
- Richmond County (1 seat)
- Rockland County (1 seat)
- St. Lawrence County (2 seats)
- Saratoga County (2 seats)
- Schenectady County (1 seat)
- Schoharie County (2 seats)
- Seneca County (1 seat)
- Steuben County (3 seats)
- Suffolk County (2 seats)
- Sullivan County (1 seat)
- Tioga County (1 seat)
- Tompkins County (2 seats)
- Ulster County (2 seats)
- Warren County (1 seat)
- Washington (2 seats)
- Wayne County (2 seats)
- Westchester County (2 seats)
- Yates County (1 seat)
Note: There are now 62 counties in the State of New York. The counties which are not mentioned in this list had not yet been established, or sufficiently organized, the area being included in one or more of the abovementioned counties.

=== Assemblymen ===
The asterisk (*) denotes members of the previous Legislature who continued as members of this Legislature.

District	Assemblymen	Party	Notes
Albany	John Davis		
Albany	James S. Lowe		
Albany	Rufus Watson		
Allegany	Seth H. Pratt*	Whig	
Allegany	William Welch	Whig	
Broome	John Stoughton		
Cattaraugus	George A. S. Crooker	Whig	
Cattaraugus	Hollis Scott		
Cayuga	Henry R. Filley*	Whig	
Cayuga	John McIntosh	Whig	
Cayuga	Nathan G. Morgan*		
Chautauqua	Waterman Ellsworth	Whig	
Chautauqua	Timothy Judson	Whig	
Chautauqua	Abner Lewis*	Whig	
Chemung	Jonathan P. Crouch		
Chenango	Samuel Drew		
Chenango	Demas Hubbard, Jr.*	Whig	
Chenango	Josiah G. Olney		
Clinton	Abijah North	Democrat	
Columbia	Harry Cornwell		
Columbia	Henry Hogeboom		
Columbia	Peter R. Livingston	Whig	
Cortland	George S. Green		
Cortland	George Isaacs		
Delaware	Ichabod Bartlett		
Delaware	Jonas More		
Dutchess	Henry Conklin	Whig	
Dutchess	Jacob Sisson*		
Dutchess	Daniel Toffey	Whig	
Erie	Jacob A. Barker	Whig	
Erie	Truman Cary	Whig	
Erie	Henry Johnson	Whig	
Essex	Gideon Hammond*	Whig	
Franklin	Asa Hascall	Whig	
Fulton and Hamilton	James Yawney		
Genesee	Andrew H. Green*	Whig	
Genesee	John Head*	Whig	
Genesee	Horace Healy	Whig	
Genesee	Alva Jefferson	Whig	
Greene	Platt Adams		
Greene	Thomas B. Cooke*	Whig	
Herkimer	Benjamin Carver		
Herkimer	Atwater Cooke Jr.		
Jefferson	Calvin Clark	Whig	
Jefferson	Charles E. Clarke	Whig	
Jefferson	Philip P. Gaige	Whig	
Kings	Cornelius Bergen*	Whig	
Kings	Jeremiah Lott		
Lewis	Sanford Coe		
Livingston	Elias Clark	Whig	
Livingston	George W. Patterson*	Whig	elected Speaker
Madison	Friend Barnard		
Madison	Benjamin Enos	Democrat	
Madison	Uriah Leland		
Monroe	William S. Bishop		
Monroe	Henry P. Norton		
Monroe	John P. Stull		
Montgomery	Isaac S. Frost		
Montgomery	Isaac Jackson		
New York	George W. Bruen	Whig	
New York	Alfred Carhart*	Whig	
New York	Loring D. Chapin	Whig	
New York	Heman W. Childs*	Whig	
New York	Noah Cook	Whig	
New York	Thomas J. Doyle	Whig	
New York	John I. Labagh*	Whig	
New York	Thomas McElrath	Whig	
New York	Samuel T. McKinney	Whig	
New York	Frederick Pentz	Whig	
New York	Stephen Potter	Whig	
New York	John B. Scoles*	Whig	
New York	George Zabriskie*	Whig	
Niagara	Davis Hurd*	Whig	
Niagara	Peter B. Porter, Jr.*	Whig	
Oneida	Jesse Armstrong		
Oneida	Ward Hunt	Democrat	
Oneida	Amasa S. Newberry		
Oneida	Israel Stoddard		
Onondaga	Phares Gould*	Whig	
Onondaga	James R. Lawrence*	Whig	
Onondaga	Azariah Smith*	Whig	
Onondaga	James L. Voorhees	Whig	
Ontario	Augustus Sawyer		
Ontario	Z. Barton Stout		
Ontario	Henry W. Taylor*	Whig	
Orange	Edward Blake	Democrat	
Orange	Robert Denniston	Democrat	
Orange	Joseph Slaughter		
Orleans	Horatio Reed*	Whig	
Oswego	Samuel Hawley		
Oswego	Edward B. Judson		
Otsego	Jonathan W. Brewer		
Otsego	Levi S. Chatfield	Democrat	
Otsego	Daniel Gilchrist		
Putnam	Herman R. Stephens		
Queens	Elias Hicks		
Rensselaer	Richard P. Herrick	Whig	
Rensselaer	Day O. Kellogg		
Rensselaer	Gideon Reynolds	Whig	
Richmond	Israel Oakley*		
Rockland	Benjamin Blackledge		
St. Lawrence	Myron G. Peck*	Democrat	
St. Lawrence	Asa Sprague	Democrat	
Saratoga	John Stewart	Whig	
Saratoga	Calvin Wheeler*	Whig	
Schenectady	Silas H. Marsh*	Whig	
Schoharie	Harvey Bliss		
Schoharie	George F. Fox		
Seneca	Gardner Welles		
Steuben	Andrew G. Chatfield	Democrat	
Steuben	Abram M. Lybolt	Democrat	
Steuben	Johnson N. Reynolds		
Suffolk	J. Wickham Case		
Suffolk	Joshua B. Smith	Democrat	
Sullivan	William F. Brodhead		
Tioga	Wright Dunham	Democrat	
Tompkins	David Bower		
Tompkins	Jesse McKinney		
Ulster	Jacob H. DeWitt	Whig	
Ulster	Henry C. Hornbeck	Whig	
Warren	William Griffing		
Washington	Salmon Axtell		
Washington	Jesse S. Leigh		
Wayne	Thomas Armstrong	Democrat	
Wayne	Ambrose Salisbury	Democrat	
Westchester	Samuel B. Ferris	Democrat	
Westchester	Joseph Strang	Democrat	
Yates	Miles Benham*	Whig	

=== Employees ===
- Clerk: Jarvis N. Lake
- Sergeant-at-Arms: William DeForest
- Doorkeeper: Samuel Francis Jr.
- Assistant Doorkeeper: Washington P. Lewis

== Sources ==
- The New York Civil List compiled by Franklin Benjamin Hough (Weed, Parsons and Co., 1858) [pg. 109 and 441 for Senate districts; pg. 132 for senators; pg. 148f for Assembly districts; pg. 221ff for assemblymen]
- The History of Political Parties in the State of New-York, from the Ratification of the Federal Constitution to 1840 by Jabez D. Hammond (4th ed., Vol. 2, Phinney & Co., Buffalo, 1850; pg. 486ff and 506 to 517)
- The Politician's Register published by Horace Greeley (1840; pg. 10f)
- Journal of the Senate (62nd Session) (1839)
