= 60th New York State Legislature =

New York state legislative session

←	59th	61st	→
- The Old State Capitol (1879)

Overview
- Legislative body: New York State Legislature
- Jurisdiction: New York, United States
- Term: January 1 – December 31, 1837

Senate
- Members: 32
- President: Lt. Gov. John Tracy (D)
- Party control: Democratic (27-5)

Assembly
- Members: 128
- Speaker: Edward Livingston (D)
- Party control: Democratic (94-34)

Sessions
- 1st: January 3 – May 16, 1837

The 60th New York State Legislature, consisting of the New York State Senate and the New York State Assembly, met from January 3 to May 16, 1837, during the fifth year of William L. Marcy's governorship, in Albany.

== Background ==
Under the provisions of the New York Constitution of 1821, 32 senators were elected on general tickets in eight senatorial districts for four-year terms. They were divided into four classes, and every year eight Senate seats came up for election. Assemblymen were elected countywide on general tickets to a one-year term, the whole Assembly being renewed annually.

State Senator John C. Kemble resigned on May 20, 1836; and State Senator Isaac W. Bishop on May 23; leaving vacancies in the Third and Fourth District.

On May 23, 1836, the Legislature re-apportioned the Senate and Assembly districts, according to the State census of 1835. Queens and Suffolk counties were transferred from the First to the Second District; Delaware County from the Second to the Third; Herkimer County from the Fifth to the Fourth; Otsego from the Sixth to the Fifth; Allegany, Cattaraugus and Livingston counties from the Eighth to the Sixth; and Cortland County from the Sixth to the Seventh. The total number of assemblymen remained 128. The new county of Chemung was apportioned one seat. Allegany, Cattaraugus, Chautauqua, Erie, Genesee, Kings, Niagara, Oswego and Steuben counties gained one seat each; New York County gained two; and Cayuga, Dutchess, Herkimer, Oneida, Otsego, Rensselaer, Saratoga, Seneca, Tioga, Tompkins, Washington and Westchester counties lost one seat each.

At this time there were two major political parties: the Democratic Party and the Whig Party. In New York City, a radical faction of the Democratic Party organized as the Equal Rights Party, and became known as the Locofocos.

The Democratic state convention met on September 14 at Herkimer and nominated Gov. William L. Marcy and Lt. Gov. John Tracy for re-election; and an electoral ticket pledged to Martin Van Buren for president and Richard M. Johnson for vice president.

The Whig state convention nominated Jesse Buel for Governor, and Gamaliel H. Barstow for Lieutenant Governor; and an electoral ticket pledged to William Henry Harrison for president.

The Equal Rights state convention met on September 15 at Utica, and nominated Isaac S. Smith for Governor; and Moses Jaques for Lieutenant Governor. In New York City, they nominated Frederick A. Tallmadge for the State Senate; and a full ticket for the Assembly, among them Clinton Roosevelt and Robert Townsend Jr. Tallmadge, Roosevelt and Townsend were then endorsed by the Whigs, and elected.

== Elections ==
The State election was held from November 7 to 9, 1836. Gov. William L. Marcy and Lt. Gov. John Tracy were re-elected to a third term. Also, the Democratic electoral ticket won; the 42 New York votes were cast for Martin Van Buren and Richard M. Johnson. In New York City, the combined vote of the Whigs and Locofocos upset the Tammany Hall political machine, electing the State Senator of the First District, and 7 of 13 assemblymen.

State Senators Samuel Young (4th D.), David Wager (5th D.) and Samuel L. Edwards (7th D.) were re-elected.

1836 New York State Senate election result
District	Democrat		Whig	
First	Morgan L. Smith	18,992	Frederick A. Tallmadge	20,173
Second	Henry H. Van Dyck	20,824	Stephen W. Fullerton	12,040
Third	Alonzo C. Paige	23,243	Elisha Jenkins	16,812
Third	Noadiah Johnson	23,218	Amos Briggs	15,805
Fourth	Samuel Young	23,575	Gerrit Wendell	14,707
Fourth	John McLean	20,616	Anthony C. Brown	14,251
Fifth	David Wager	17,851	Samuel Comstock	17,241
Sixth	Daniel S. Dickinson	21,497	Peter Robinson	17,813
Seventh	Samuel L. Edwards	20,316	James R. Lawrence	17,227
Eighth	Alexis Ward	15,894	Samuel Works	22,346

== Sessions ==
The Legislature met for the regular session at the Old State Capitol in Albany on January 3, 1837; and adjourned on May 16.

Edward Livingston (D) was elected Speaker with 80 votes against 27 for Luther Bradish (W).

Upon taking their seats in the Senate, Johnson and Paige (3rd D.), and McLean and Young (4th D.), drew lots to decide which one of the two senators elected in each district would serve the short term, and which one the full term. Paige and McLean drew the short term, and Johnson and Young the full term.

On February 6, State Treasurer Abraham Keyser was re-elected.

On February 7, the Legislature re-elected U.S. Senator Silas Wright, Jr. to a six-year term beginning on March 4, 1837.

Near the end of the session, the Panic of 1837 erupted.

== State Senate ==
=== Districts ===
- The First District (4 seats) consisted of Kings, New York and Richmond counties.
- The Second District (4 seats) consisted of Dutchess, Orange, Putnam, Queens, Rockland, Suffolk, Sullivan, Ulster and Westchester counties.
- The Third District (4 seats) consisted of Albany, Columbia, Delaware, Greene, Rensselaer, Schenectady and Schoharie counties.
- The Fourth District (4 seats) consisted of Clinton, Essex, Franklin, Hamilton, Herkimer, Montgomery, St. Lawrence, Saratoga, Warren and Washington counties.
- The Fifth District (4 seats) consisted of Jefferson, Lewis, Madison, Oneida, Oswego and Otsego counties.
- The Sixth District (4 seats) consisted of Allegany, Broome, Cattaraugus, Chemung, Chenango, Livingston, Steuben, Tioga and Tompkins counties.
- The Seventh District (4 seats) consisted of Cayuga, Cortland, Onondaga, Ontario, Seneca, Wayne and Yates counties.
- The Eighth District (4 seats) consisted of Chautauqua, Erie, Genesee, Monroe, Niagara and Orleans counties.
Note: There are now 62 counties in the State of New York. The counties which are not mentioned in this list had not yet been established, or sufficiently organized, the area being included in one or more of the abovementioned counties.

=== Members ===
The asterisk (*) denotes members of the previous Legislature who continued in office as members of this Legislature.

Senators who resided in counties which were transferred to a different district continued to represent the district in which they were elected.

District	Senators	Term left	Party	Notes
First	Charles L. Livingston*	1 year	Democrat	
First	Coe S. Downing*	2 years	Democrat	
First	Henry Floyd-Jones*	3 years	Democrat	resided in Queens Co., elected in the old 1st D.
First	Frederick A. Tallmadge	4 years	Locofoco/Whig	
Second	Leonard Maison*	1 year	Democrat	
Second	John P. Jones*	2 years	Democrat	
Second	John Hunter*	3 years	Democrat	
Second	Henry H. Van Dyck	4 years	Democrat	
Third	Alonzo C. Paige	1 year	Democrat	elected to fill vacancy, in place of John C. Kemble; also Reporter of the New York Court of Chancery
Third	Abraham L. Lawyer*	2 years	Democrat	
Third	James Powers*	3 years	Democrat	
Third	Noadiah Johnson	4 years	Democrat	
Fourth	John McLean	1 year	Democrat	elected to fill vacancy, in place of Isaac W. Bishop; also First Judge of the Washington County Court
Fourth	Jabez Willes*	2 years	Democrat	
Fourth	David Spraker*	3 years	Democrat	
Fourth	Samuel Young*	4 years	Democrat	also a Canal Commissioner and First Judge of the Saratoga Co. Court
Fifth	Francis Seger*	1 year	Democrat	
Fifth	Abijah Beckwith*	2 years	Democrat	resided in Herkimer Co., elected in the old 5th D.
Fifth	Micah Sterling*	3 years	Democrat	
Fifth	David Wager*	4 years	Democrat	
Sixth	Ebenezer Mack*	1 year	Democrat	
Sixth	Levi Beardsley*	2 years	Democrat	resided in Otsego Co., elected in the old 6th D.
Sixth	George Huntington*	3 years	Democrat	
Sixth	Daniel S. Dickinson	4 years	Democrat	
Seventh	Thomas Armstrong*	1 year	Democrat	
Seventh	Chester Loomis*	2 years	Democrat	also Postmaster of Rushville
Seventh	John Beardsley*	3 years	Democrat	
Seventh	Samuel L. Edwards*	4 years	Democrat	
Eighth	Albert H. Tracy*	1 year	Whig	
Eighth	Isaac Lacey*	2 years	Whig	
Eighth	Chauncey J. Fox*	3 years	Whig	resided in Cattaraugus Co., elected in the old 8th D.
Eighth	Samuel Works	4 years	Whig	

=== Employees ===
- Clerk: John F. Bacon

== State Assembly ==
=== Districts ===
- Albany County (3 seats)
- Allegany County (2 seats)
- Broome County (1 seat)
- Cattaraugus County (2 seats)
- Cayuga County (3 seats)
- Chautauqua County (3 seats)
- Chemung County (1 seat)
- Chenango County (3 seats)
- Clinton County (1 seat)
- Columbia County (3 seats)
- Cortland County (2 seats)
- Delaware County (2 seats)
- Dutchess County (3 seats)
- Erie County (3 seats)
- Essex County (1 seat)
- Franklin County (1 seat)
- Genesee County (4 seats)
- Greene County (2 seats)
- Hamilton and Montgomery counties (3 seats)
- Herkimer County (2 seats)
- Jefferson County (3 seats)
- Kings County (2 seats)
- Lewis County (1 seat)
- Livingston County (2 seats)
- Madison County (3 seats)
- Monroe County (3 seats)
- The City and County of New York (13 seats)
- Niagara County (2 seats)
- Oneida County (4 seats)
- Onondaga County (4 seats)
- Ontario County (3 seats)
- Orange County (3 seats)
- Orleans County (1 seat)
- Oswego County (2 seats)
- Otsego County (3 seats)
- Putnam County (1 seat)
- Queens County (1 seat)
- Rensselaer County (3 seats)
- Richmond County (1 seat)
- Rockland County (1 seat)
- St. Lawrence County (2 seats)
- Saratoga County (2 seats)
- Schenectady County (1 seat)
- Schoharie County (2 seats)
- Seneca County (1 seat)
- Steuben County (3 seats)
- Suffolk County (2 seats)
- Sullivan County (1 seat)
- Tioga County (1 seat)
- Tompkins County (2 seats)
- Ulster County (2 seats)
- Warren County (1 seat)
- Washington (2 seats)
- Wayne County (2 seats)
- Westchester County (2 seats)
- Yates County (1 seat)
Note: There are now 62 counties in the State of New York. The counties which are not mentioned in this list had not yet been established, or sufficiently organized, the area being included in one or more of the abovementioned counties.

=== Assemblymen ===
The asterisk (*) denotes members of the previous Legislature who continued as members of this Legislature.

Party affiliations follow the vote on State officers on February 6 and 7;, the result given by the Whig Almanac, and the result for New York City given in Niles' Register.

District	Assemblymen	Party	Notes
Albany	Richard Kimmey	Democrat	
Albany	Edward Livingston	Democrat	elected Speaker
Albany	Abraham Verplanck	Democrat	
Allegany	Calvin T. Chamberlain*	Democrat	also Postmaster of Cuba
Allegany	Azel Fitch	Democrat	
Broome	Judson Allen*	Democrat	also Postmaster of Harpursville
Cattaraugus	Tilly Gilbert	Democrat	
Cattaraugus	Phineas Spencer	Democrat	
Cayuga	Curtiss C. Cady	Democrat	
Cayuga	Charles E. Shepard*	Democrat	
Cayuga	William Wilbur*	Democrat	
Chautauqua	Alvin Plumb	Whig	
Chautauqua	Calvin Rumsey	Whig	
Chautauqua	William Wilcox	Whig	
Chemung	Jacob Westlake	Democrat	
Chenango	John F. Hill	Democrat	
Chenango	Squire Smith*	Democrat	
Chenango	Isaac Stokes	Democrat	
Clinton	Cornelius Halsey	Democrat	
Columbia	William W. Hoysradt	Democrat	
Columbia	Rufus Reed	Democrat	
Columbia	John S. Vosburgh	Democrat	
Cortland	Josiah Hine	Whig	
Cortland	John Thomas	Whig	
Delaware	Jesse Booth	Democrat	
Delaware	Thomas J. Hubbell	Democrat	
Dutchess	Taber Belding	Democrat	
Dutchess	John R. Myer	Democrat	
Dutchess	David Shelden	Democrat	
Erie	Benjamin O. Bivins	Whig	
Erie	Squire S. Case	Whig	
Erie	Elisha Smith	Whig	
Essex	Gideon Hammond	Whig	
Franklin	Luther Bradish*	Whig	
Genesee	Reuben Benham	Whig	
Genesee	John A. McElwain	Whig	
Genesee	Leverett Seward	Whig	
Genesee	Charles O. Shepard*	Whig	
Greene	Stephen Tryon	Democrat	
Greene	John Watson	Democrat	
Hamilton and Montgomery	Joseph Blair*	Democrat	
Hamilton and Montgomery	Jacob Hees	Democrat	
Hamilton and Montgomery	Richard Peck	Democrat	
Herkimer	Henry L. Easton	Democrat	
Herkimer	Aaron Hackley	Democrat	
Jefferson	Jotham Bigelow	Democrat	
Jefferson	Richard Hulbert*	Democrat	
Jefferson	John W. Tamblin	Democrat	
Kings	Joseph Conselyea	Democrat	
Kings	Richard V. W. Thorne	Democrat	
Lewis	George D. Ruggles	Democrat	
Livingston	George W. Patterson*	Whig	
Livingston	William Scott	Whig	
Madison	Wait Clark	Democrat	
Madison	Isaac Coe Jr.	Democrat	
Madison	Silas Sayles	Democrat	
Monroe	Levi Russell	Whig	
Monroe	Derick Sibley	Whig	
Monroe	Silas Walker	Whig	
New York	Henry Andrew	Whig	
New York	Charles P. Clinch*	Democrat	
New York	Francis B. Cutting*	Democrat	
New York	Morris Franklin	Whig	elected in a special election on December 21 and 22, 1836, after there was a tie for the thirteenth seat at the regular election
New York	Thomas Herttell*	Democrat	
New York	John I. Labagh	Whig	
New York	Clinton Roosevelt	Locofoco/Whig	
New York	Thomas G. Talmage	Democrat	
New York	Robert Townsend Jr.	Locofoco/Whig	
New York	Thomas W. Tucker	Democrat	
New York	James I. M. Valentine	Democrat	
New York	Anson Willis	Whig	
New York	George Zabriskie	Whig	
Niagara	Reuben H. Boughton	Democrat	contested by Davis Hurd (W) who was seated on January 24
Niagara	Hiram McNeil	Whig	
Oneida	Levi Buckingham	Democrat	
Oneida	John I. Cook	Democrat	
Oneida	Lester N. Fowler	Democrat	
Oneida	Andrew S. Pond	Democrat	
Onondaga	Daniel Denison*	Democrat	
Onondaga	George Pettit	Democrat	
Onondaga	William Porter Jr.	Democrat	
Onondaga	Nathan Soule	Democrat	
Ontario	Amos Jones*	Whig	
Ontario	Henry Pardee*	Whig	
Ontario	Henry W. Taylor	Whig	
Orange	Merit H. Cash	Democrat	
Orange	William Jackson	Democrat	
Orange	William Morrison	Democrat	
Orleans	Silas M. Burroughs	Democrat	
Oswego	Caleb Carr	Democrat	
Oswego	Orville Robinson*	Democrat	also Surrogate of Oswego Co.
Otsego	Edmund B. Bigelow	Democrat	
Otsego	Ivory Holland*	Democrat	
Otsego	Harvey Strong	Democrat	
Putnam	John Crawford	Democrat	
Queens	Jarvis Jackson*	Democrat	
Rensselaer	Randall A. Brown	Democrat	
Rensselaer	Alexander Bryan	Democrat	
Rensselaer	Abraham Van Tuyl	Democrat	
Richmond	Lawrence Hillyer	Whig	unsuccessfully contested by John Garretson Jr.
Rockland	Abraham J. Demarest	Democrat	
St. Lawrence	Preston King*	Democrat	
St. Lawrence	William S. Paddock*	Democrat	
Saratoga	Seabury Allen	Democrat	
Saratoga	Halsey Rogers	Democrat	
Schenectady	Thomas Knight	Democrat	
Schoharie	Philip Mann	Democrat	
Schoharie	Reuben Merchant	Democrat	
Seneca	John L. Bigelow	Democrat	
Steuben	Henry G. Cotton	Democrat	
Steuben	John I. Poppino	Democrat	
Steuben	Benjamin Smead	Democrat	
Suffolk	Josiah C. Dayton	Democrat	
Suffolk	John M. Williamson	Democrat	
Sullivan	George S. Joscelyn	Democrat	
Tioga	Ezra Canfield	Democrat	
Tompkins	Lewis Halsey	Democrat	
Tompkins	Benjamin Jennings	Democrat	
Ulster	Ephraim E. Depuy	Democrat	
Ulster	Samuel Elmore	Democrat	
Warren	Walter Geer Jr.	Democrat	
Washington	Joseph W. Richards	Whig	
Washington	Charles Rogers	Whig	
Wayne	David Arne Jr.	Democrat	
Wayne	Pomeroy Tucker	Democrat	
Westchester	William Fisher*	Democrat	
Westchester	Barnardus Montross	Democrat	
Yates	Mordecai Ogden*	Democrat	

=== Employees ===
- Clerk: Philip Reynolds Jr.
- Sergeant-at-Arms: Alden S. Stevens
- Doorkeeper: William H. Powell
- Assistant Doorkeeper: James Halliday Jr.

== Sources ==
- The New York Civil List compiled by Franklin Benjamin Hough (Weed, Parsons and Co., 1858) [pg. 109 and 441 for Senate districts; pg. 131 for senators; pg. 148f for Assembly districts; pg. 219f for assemblymen]
- The History of Political Parties in the State of New-York, from the Ratification of the Federal Constitution to 1840 by Jabez D. Hammond (4th ed., Vol. 2, Phinney & Co., Buffalo, 1850; pg. 462 to 479)
