= 59th New York State Legislature =

New York state legislative session

←	58th	60th	→
- The Old State Capitol (1879)

Overview
- Legislative body: New York State Legislature
- Jurisdiction: New York, United States
- Term: January 1 – December 31, 1836

Senate
- Members: 32
- President: Lieutenant Governor John Tracy (Democrat)
- Party control: Democratic (28-4)

Assembly
- Members: 128
- Speaker: Charles Humphrey (Democrat)
- Party control: Democratic

Sessions
- 1st: January 5 – May 26, 1836

The 59th New York State Legislature, consisting of the New York State Senate and the New York State Assembly, met from January 5 to May 26, 1836, during the fourth year of William L. Marcy's governorship, in Albany.

== Background ==
Under the provisions of the New York Constitution of 1821, 32 senators were elected on general tickets in eight senatorial districts for four-year terms. They were divided into four classes, and every year eight Senate seats came up for election. Assemblymen were elected countywide on general tickets to a one-year term, the whole Assembly being renewed annually.

State Senator John Sudam died on April 13, 1835; and State Senator John G. Stower resigned on September 29, 1835; leaving vacancies in the Second and Fifth District.

Canal Commissioner Michael Hoffman resigned on May 6, 1835. On May 9, the Legislature elected Heman J. Redfield to succeed Hoffman, but Redfield declined to take office. During the recess of the Legislature, Gov. Marcy appointed John Bowman to fill the vacancy temporarily.

At this time there were two political parties: the Democratic Party and the Whig Party.

== Elections ==
The State election was held from November 2 to 4, 1835. State Senator Chauncey J. Fox (8th D.) was re-elected. Henry Floyd-Jones (1st D.), John Hunter, Ebenezer Lounsbery (both 2nd D.), James Powers (3rd D.), David Spraker (4th D.), Micah Sterling (5th D.), George Huntington (6th D.), John Beardsley (7th D.) and Assemblyman David Wager (5th D.) were also elected to the Senate. Fox was a Whig, the other nine were Democrats.

== Sessions ==
The Legislature met for the regular session at the Old State Capitol in Albany on January 5, 1836; and adjourned on May 26.

Charles Humphrey (D) was re-elected Speaker.

Upon taking their seats in the Senate, Hunter and Lounsbery (2nd D.), and Sterling and Wager (5th D.), drew lots to decide which one of the two senators elected in each district would serve the short term, and which one the full term. Lounsbery and Wager drew the short term, and Hunter and Sterling the full term.

On January 6, Attorney General Greene C. Bronson was appointed to the New York Supreme Court.

On January 9, the Legislature confirmed Gov. Marcy's recess appointment of John Bowman as Canal Commissioner.

On January 12, the Legislature elected Congressman Samuel Beardsley to succeed Bronson as Attorney General.

On February 1, the Legislature re-elected Secretary of State John A. Dix, State Comptroller Azariah C. Flagg and State Treasurer Abraham Keyser.

On May 20, State Senator John C. Kemble resigned after accusations of fraudulent and corrupt stock trading.

On Saturday, May 21, the Senate rejected a motion to expel Isaac W. Bishop, and adjourned.

On Monday morning, May 23, at the beginning of the session, State Senators Samuel Young and Myndert Van Schaick resigned their seats, stating they would not sit together with persons who refused to expel Bishop after finding him "guilty of moral and official misconduct." About half an hour later Bishop resigned his seat too.

Later on May 23, the Legislature passed "An act authorizing the appointment of an additional acting Canal Commissioner," and on May 25, the Legislature elected William Baker to the office.

On May 23, the Legislature also re-apportioned the Senate and Assembly districts, according to the State census of 1835. Queens and Suffolk counties were transferred from the First to the Second District; Delaware County from the Second to the Third; Herkimer County from the Fifth to the Fourth; Otsego from the Sixth to the Fifth; Allegany, Cattaraugus and Livingston counties from the Eighth to the Sixth; and Cortland County from the Sixth to the Seventh. The total number of assemblymen remained 128. The new county of Chemung was apportioned one seat. Allegany, Cattaraugus, Chautauqua, Erie, Genesee, Kings, Niagara, Oswego and Steuben counties gained one seat each; New York County gained two; and Cayuga, Dutchess, Herkimer, Oneida, Otsego, Rensselaer, Saratoga, Seneca, Tioga, Tompkins, Washington and Westchester counties lost one seat each.

The Democratic state convention met on September 14 at Herkimer and nominated Gov. Marcy and Lt. Gov. Tracy for re-election; and an electoral ticket pledged to Martin Van Buren for president and Richard M. Johnson for vice president.

The Whig state convention nominated Jesse Buel for Governor, and Gamaliel H. Barstow for Lieutenant Governor; and an electoral ticket pledged to William Henry Harrison for president.

The Equal Rights Party state convention met on September 15 at Utica; Robert Townsend Jr. was Chairman. They nominated Isaac S. Smith, of Buffalo, for Governor; and Moses Jaques, of New York City, for Lieutenant Governor.

== State Senate ==
=== Districts ===
- The First District (4 seats) consisted of Kings, New York, Queens, Richmond and Suffolk counties.
- The Second District (4 seats) consisted of Delaware, Dutchess, Orange, Putnam, Rockland, Sullivan, Ulster and Westchester counties.
- The Third District (4 seats) consisted of Albany, Columbia, Greene, Rensselaer, Schenectady and Schoharie counties.
- The Fourth District (4 seats) consisted of Clinton, Essex, Franklin, Hamilton, Montgomery, St. Lawrence, Saratoga, Warren and Washington counties.
- The Fifth District (4 seats) consisted of Herkimer, Jefferson, Lewis, Madison, Oneida and Oswego counties.
- The Sixth District (4 seats) consisted of Broome, Chenango, Cortland, Otsego, Steuben, Tioga and Tompkins counties.
- The Seventh District (4 seats) consisted of Cayuga, Onondaga, Ontario, Seneca, Wayne and Yates counties.
- The Eighth District (4 seats) consisted of Allegany, Cattaraugus, Chautauqua, Erie, Genesee, Livingston, Monroe, Niagara and Orleans counties.
Note: There are now 62 counties in the State of New York. The counties which are not mentioned in this list had not yet been established, or sufficiently organized, the area being included in one or more of the abovementioned counties.

=== Members ===
The asterisk (*) denotes members of the previous Legislature who continued in office as members of this Legislature. David Wager changed from the Assembly to the Senate.

District	Senators	Term left	Party	Notes
First	Myndert Van Schaick*	1 year	Democrat	resigned on May 23, 1836
First	Charles L. Livingston*	2 years	Democrat	
First	Coe S. Downing*	3 years	Democrat	
First	Henry Floyd-Jones	4 years	Democrat	
Second	Ebenezer Lounsbery	1 year	Democrat	elected to fill vacancy, in place of John Sudam
Second	Leonard Maison*	2 years	Democrat	
Second	John P. Jones*	3 years	Democrat	
Second	John Hunter	4 years	Democrat	
Third	Peter Gansevoort*	1 year	Democrat	
Third	John C. Kemble*	2 years	Democrat	resigned on May 20, 1836
Third	Abraham L. Lawyer*	3 years	Democrat	
Third	James Powers	4 years	Democrat	
Fourth	Samuel Young*	1 year	Democrat	also a Canal Commissioner and First Judge of the Saratoga Co. Court; resigned on May 23, 1836
Fourth	Isaac W. Bishop*	2 years	Democrat	resigned on May 23, 1836
Fourth	Jabez Willes*	3 years	Democrat	
Fourth	David Spraker	4 years	Democrat	
Fifth	David Wager*	1 year	Democrat	elected to fill vacancy, in place of John G. Stower
Fifth	Francis Seger*	2 years	Democrat	
Fifth	Abijah Beckwith*	3 years	Democrat	
Fifth	Micah Sterling	4 years	Democrat	
Sixth	John F. Hubbard*	1 year	Democrat	
Sixth	Ebenezer Mack*	2 years	Democrat	
Sixth	Levi Beardsley*	3 years	Democrat	
Sixth	George Huntington	4 years	Democrat	
Seventh	Samuel L. Edwards*	1 year	Democrat	
Seventh	Thomas Armstrong*	2 years	Democrat	
Seventh	Chester Loomis*	3 years	Democrat	also Postmaster of Rushville
Seventh	John Beardsley	4 years	Democrat	
Eighth	John Griffin*	1 year	Whig	
Eighth	Albert H. Tracy*	2 years	Whig	
Eighth	Isaac Lacey*	3 years	Whig	
Eighth	Chauncey J. Fox*	4 years	Whig	

=== Employees ===
- Clerk: John F. Bacon

== State Assembly ==
=== Districts ===
- Albany County (3 seats)
- Allegany County (1 seat)
- Broome County (1 seat)
- Cattaraugus County (1 seat)
- Cayuga County (4 seats)
- Chautauqua County (2 seats)
- Chenango County (3 seats)
- Clinton County (1 seat)
- Columbia County (3 seats)
- Cortland County (2 seats)
- Delaware County (2 seats)
- Dutchess County (4 seats)
- Erie County (2 seats)
- Essex County (1 seat)
- Franklin County (1 seat)
- Genesee County (3 seats)
- Greene County (2 seats)
- Hamilton and Montgomery counties (3 seats)
- Herkimer County (3 seats)
- Jefferson County (3 seats)
- Kings County (1 seat)
- Lewis County (1 seat)
- Livingston County (2 seats)
- Madison County (3 seats)
- Monroe County (3 seats)
- The City and County of New York (11 seats)
- Niagara County (1 seat)
- Oneida County (5 seats)
- Onondaga County (4 seats)
- Ontario County (3 seats)
- Orange County (3 seats)
- Orleans County (1 seat)
- Oswego County (1 seat)
- Otsego County (4 seats)
- Putnam County (1 seat)
- Queens County (1 seat)
- Rensselaer County (4 seats)
- Richmond County (1 seat)
- Rockland County (1 seat)
- St. Lawrence County (2 seats)
- Saratoga County (3 seats)
- Schenectady County (1 seat)
- Schoharie County (2 seats)
- Seneca County (2 seats)
- Steuben County (2 seats)
- Suffolk County (2 seats)
- Sullivan County (1 seat)
- Tioga County (2 seats)
- Tompkins County (3 seats)
- Ulster County (2 seats)
- Warren County (1 seat)
- Washington (3 seats)
- Wayne County (2 seats)
- Westchester County (3 seats)
- Yates County (1 seat)
Note: There are now 62 counties in the State of New York. The counties which are not mentioned in this list had not yet been established, or sufficiently organized, the area being included in one or more of the abovementioned counties.

=== Assemblymen ===
The asterisk (*) denotes members of the previous Legislature who continued as members of this Legislature.

District	Assemblymen	Party	Notes
Albany	Daniel Dorman		
Albany	John C. Schuyler		
Albany	William Seymour	Democrat	
Allegany	Calvin T. Chamberlain	Democrat	also Postmaster of Cuba
Broome	Judson Allen	Democrat	also Postmaster of Harpursville
Cattaraugus	David Day		
Cayuga	Dennis Arnold	Democrat	
Cayuga	Charles E. Shepard	Democrat	
Cayuga	Richard L. Smith	Democrat	
Cayuga	William Wilbur	Democrat	
Chautauqua	Thomas B. Campbell	Whig	
Chautauqua	Richard P. Marvin	Whig	in November 1836, elected to the 25th U.S. Congress
Chenango	William Knowlton		
Chenango	Nicholas B. Mead		
Chenango	Squire Smith	Democrat	
Clinton	Lemuel Stetson*	Democrat	
Columbia	Charles B. Dutcher		
Columbia	Peter Groat Jr.		
Columbia	Adam I. Shaver		
Cortland	Cephas Comstock	Whig	
Cortland	Chauncey Keep	Whig	unsuccessfully contested by Lewis Riggs (D)
Delaware	John Griffin		
Delaware	James W. Knapp		
Dutchess	Abijah G. Benedict		
Dutchess	Cornelius H. Cornell		
Dutchess	Wiliam Eno		
Dutchess	Stoddard Judd*	Democrat	
Erie	George P. Barker	Democrat	also D.A. of Erie Co.
Erie	Wells Brooks		
Essex	Thomas A. Tomlinson*	Whig	
Franklin	Luther Bradish	Whig	
Genesee	Samuel Richmond*	Whig	
Genesee	Charles O. Shepard	Whig	
Genesee	Amos Tyrrel Jr.*	Whig	
Greene	Ambrose Baker		
Greene	Luke Kiersted		
Hamilton and Montgomery	Henry V. Berry		
Hamilton and Montgomery	Joseph Blair	Democrat	
Hamilton and Montgomery	Jacob Johnson		
Herkimer	Stephen Ayres		
Herkimer	Frederick Bellinger		
Herkimer	Thomas Hawks		
Jefferson	Lowrey Barney		
Jefferson	Richard Hulbert	Democrat	
Jefferson	Otis P. Starkey		
Kings	John Dikeman		
Lewis	Charles Dayan*	Democrat	
Livingston	Charles H. Carroll	Whig	
Livingston	George W. Patterson*	Whig	
Madison	Ephraim Gray		
Madison	William J. Hough*	Democrat	
Madison	John B. Yates	Democrat	also First Judge of the Madison Co. Court; died on July 10, 1836
Monroe	Horace Gay		
Monroe	Micajah W. Kirby	Democrat	
Monroe	Joseph Sibley	Democrat	in November 1836, elected a presidential elector
New York	Charles P. Clinch*	Democrat	
New York	Ezra S. Conner		
New York	Peter A. Cowdrey		
New York	Francis B. Cutting	Democrat	
New York	Thomas Herttell*	Democrat	
New York	John J. Morgan	Democrat	
New York	Benjamin Ringgold*	Democrat	
New York	George Seaman		
New York	George Sharp		
New York	Jesse West		
New York	Prosper M. Wetmore*	Democrat	
Niagara	Hiram Gardner	Democrat	in November 1836, elected a presidential elector
Oneida	Henry Graves		
Oneida	John W. Hale		
Oneida	William Knight		
Oneida	Jared C. Pettibone		
Oneida	John Stryker		
Onondaga	Daniel Denison	Democrat	
Onondaga	David Munro	Democrat	in November 1836, elected a presidential elector
Onondaga	Sandford C. Parker*	Democrat	
Onondaga	John Wilkinson*	Democrat	also Postmaster of Syracuse
Ontario	Amos Jones	Whig	
Ontario	Henry Pardee	Whig	
Ontario	Mark H. Sibley*	Whig	in November 1836, elected to the 25th U.S. Congress
Orange	Charles Borland, Jr.		also D.A. of Orange Co.
Orange	Robert Sly		
Orange	Thomas Van Etten		
Orleans	John Chamberlain		
Oswego	Orville Robinson	Democrat	also Surrogate of Oswego Co.
Otsego	Albert Benton		
Otsego	Sumner Ely		
Otsego	Ivory Holland	Democrat	
Otsego	Lyman J. Walworth		
Putnam	Moses C. Robinson		
Queens	Jarvis Jackson	Democrat	
Rensselaer	David L. Seymour	Democrat	
Rensselaer	Alexander O. Spencer		
Rensselaer	John J. Viele		
Rensselaer	Nathan West		
Richmond	John Garretson Jr.		
Rockland	Daniel Johnson		
St. Lawrence	Preston King*	Democrat	
St. Lawrence	William S. Paddock*	Democrat	
Saratoga	David Benedict		
Saratoga	Joel Lee		
Saratoga	Samuel Stimson		
Schenectady	John B. Duane		
Schoharie	Hiram Walden	Democrat	
Schoharie	Alvin Wilkins		
Seneca	Henry Simpson		
Seneca	John G. Tubbs		
Steuben	Lemuel B. Searles		
Steuben	Henry Switzer		
Suffolk	Charles A. Floyd	Democrat	
Suffolk	Nathaniel Topping		
Sullivan	Samuel G. Dimmick		
Tioga	Elijah H. Goodwin		
Tioga	William H. Sutton		
Tompkins	William R. Fitch		
Tompkins	George B. Guinnip	Democrat	
Tompkins	Charles Humphrey*	Democrat	re-elected Speaker
Ulster	Jacob Chambers		
Ulster	Herman M. Romeyn		
Warren	William Griffing		
Washington	Aaron Barker		
Washington	Alexander Robertson		
Washington	Stephen L. Viele		
Wayne	Robert Alsop		
Wayne	Reuben H. Foster		
Westchester	William Fisher	Democrat	
Westchester	Horatio Lockwood*	Democrat	
Westchester	Prince W. Paddock*	Democrat	
Yates	Mordecai Ogden	Democrat	

=== Employees ===
- Clerk: Philip Reynolds Jr.
- Sergeant-at-Arms: Daniel Dygert
- Doorkeeper: William Powell
- Assistant Doorkeeper: Daniel Sweatman

== Sources ==
- The New York Civil List compiled by Franklin Benjamin Hough (Weed, Parsons and Co., 1858) [pg. 109 and 441 for Senate districts; pg. 130f for senators; pg. 148f for Assembly districts; pg. 217f for assemblymen]
- The History of Political Parties in the State of New-York, from the Ratification of the Federal Constitution to 1840 by Jabez D. Hammond (4th ed., Vol. 2, Phinney & Co., Buffalo, 1850; pg. 454 to 462)
