= Senator Beardsley =

Senator Beardsley may refer to:

- John Beardsley (New York politician) (1783–1857), New York State Senate
- Levi Beardsley (1785–1857), New York State Senate
- Samuel Beardsley (1790–1860), New York State Senate
- William S. Beardsley (1901–1954), Iowa State Senate
