= 61st New York State Legislature =

New York state legislative session

←	60th	62nd	→
- The Old State Capitol (1879)

Overview
- Legislative body: New York State Legislature
- Jurisdiction: New York, United States
- Term: January 1 – December 31, 1838

Senate
- Members: 32
- President: Lt. Gov. John Tracy (D)
- Party control: Democratic (22-10)

Assembly
- Members: 128
- Speaker: Luther Bradish (W)
- Party control: Whig (100-28)

Sessions
- 1st: January 2 – April 18, 1838

The 61st New York State Legislature, consisting of the New York State Senate and the New York State Assembly, met from January 2 to April 18, 1838, during the sixth year of William L. Marcy's governorship, in Albany.

== Background ==
Under the provisions of the New York Constitution of 1821, 32 Senators were elected on general tickets in eight senatorial districts for four-year terms. They were divided into four classes, and every year eight Senate seats came up for election. Assemblymen were elected countywide on general tickets to a one-year term, the whole Assembly being renewed annually.

At this time there were two political parties: the Democratic Party and the Whig Party.

In May 1837, the Panic of 1837 broke out, and led to a severe financial crisis. The incumbent Democratic State government was blamed for it by the voters, and the opposing Whig Party won the election in November in a landslide.

== Elections ==
The State election was held from November 6 to 8, 1837. Gulian C. Verplanck (1st D.), Henry A. Livingston (2nd D.), Edward P. Livingston (3rd D.), Martin Lee (4th D.), Avery Skinner (5th D.), Laurens Hull (6th D.), John Maynard (7th D.) and William A. Moseley (8th D.) were elected to the Senate. Edward P. Livingston and Avery Skinner were Democrats, the other six were Whigs.

== Sessions ==
The Legislature met for the regular session at the Old State Capitol in Albany on January 2, 1838; and adjourned on April 18.

Luther Bradish (W) was elected Speaker.

On February 5, the Legislature elected Gamaliel H. Barstow (W) to succeed Abraham Keyser (D) as State Treasurer; and Orville L. Holley (W) to succeed William Campbell (D) as Surveyor General.

On September 12, the Whig state convention met at Utica, and nominated William H. Seward for Governor, and Speaker Luther Bradish for Lieutenant Governor. On the same day, the Democratic state convention met at Herkimer, and nominated Gov. Marcy and Lt. Gov. Tracy unanimously for re-election.

On October 3, a state convention of former Democrats (among them U.S. Senator Nathaniel P. Tallmadge, Congressman John C. Clark and Ex-Assemblyman Judah Hammond) met under the name of "Conservatives" at Syracuse, and endorsed the Whig nominees Seward and Bradish.

== State Senate ==
=== Districts ===
- The First District (4 seats) consisted of Kings, New York and Richmond counties.
- The Second District (4 seats) consisted of Dutchess, Orange, Putnam, Queens, Rockland, Suffolk, Sullivan, Ulster and Westchester counties.
- The Third District (4 seats) consisted of Albany, Columbia, Delaware, Greene, Rensselaer, Schenectady and Schoharie counties.
- The Fourth District (4 seats) consisted of Clinton, Essex, Franklin, Hamilton, Herkimer, Montgomery, St. Lawrence, Saratoga, Warren and Washington counties.
- The Fifth District (4 seats) consisted of Jefferson, Lewis, Madison, Oneida, Oswego and Otsego counties.
- The Sixth District (4 seats) consisted of Allegany, Broome, Cattaraugus, Chemung, Chenango, Livingston, Steuben, Tioga and Tompkins counties.
- The Seventh District (4 seats) consisted of Cayuga, Cortland, Onondaga, Ontario, Seneca, Wayne and Yates counties.
- The Eighth District (4 seats) consisted of Chautauqua, Erie, Genesee, Monroe, Niagara and Orleans counties.
Note: There are now 62 counties in the State of New York. The counties which are not mentioned in this list had not yet been established, or sufficiently organized, the area being included in one or more of the abovementioned counties.

=== Members ===
The asterisk (*) denotes members of the previous Legislature who continued in office as members of this Legislature.

Senators who resided in counties which were transferred to a different district continued to represent the district in which they were elected.

District	Senators	Term left	Party	Notes
First	Coe S. Downing*	1 year	Democrat	
First	Henry Floyd-Jones*	2 years	Democrat	resided in Queens Co., elected in the old 1st D.
First	Frederick A. Tallmadge*	3 years	Whig	
First	Gulian C. Verplanck	4 years	Whig	
Second	John P. Jones*	1 year	Democrat	
Second	John Hunter*	2 years	Democrat	
Second	Henry H. Van Dyck*	3 years	Democrat	
Second	Henry A. Livingston	4 years	Whig	
Third	Abraham L. Lawyer*	1 year	Democrat	
Third	James Powers*	2 years	Democrat	
Third	Noadiah Johnson*	3 years	Democrat	
Third	Edward P. Livingston	4 years	Democrat	
Fourth	Jabez Willes*	1 year	Democrat	
Fourth	David Spraker*	2 years	Democrat	
Fourth	Samuel Young*	3 years	Democrat	also a Canal Commissioner and, until February 13, 1838, First Judge of the Saratoga Co. Court
Fourth	Martin Lee	4 years	Whig	
Fifth	Abijah Beckwith*	1 year	Democrat	resided in Herkimer Co., elected in the old 5th D.
Fifth	Micah Sterling*	2 years	Democrat	
Fifth	David Wager*	3 years	Democrat	
Fifth	Avery Skinner	4 years	Democrat	also Postmaster of Union Square
Sixth	Levi Beardsley*	1 year	Democrat	resided in Otsego Co., elected in the old 6th D.
Sixth	George Huntington*	2 years	Democrat	
Sixth	Daniel S. Dickinson*	3 years	Democrat	
Sixth	Laurens Hull	4 years	Whig	
Seventh	Chester Loomis*	1 year	Democrat	also Postmaster of Rushville
Seventh	John Beardsley*	2 years	Democrat	
Seventh	Samuel L. Edwards*	3 years	Democrat	
Seventh	John Maynard	4 years	Whig	
Eighth	Isaac Lacey*	1 year	Whig	
Eighth	Chauncey J. Fox*	2 years	Whig	resided in Cattaraugus Co., elected in the old 8th D.
Eighth	Samuel Works*	3 years	Whig	
Eighth	William A. Moseley	4 years	Whig	

=== Employees ===
- Clerk: John F. Bacon

== State Assembly ==
=== Districts ===
- Albany County (3 seats)
- Allegany County (2 seats)
- Broome County (1 seat)
- Cattaraugus County (2 seats)
- Cayuga County (3 seats)
- Chautauqua County (3 seats)
- Chemung County (1 seat)
- Chenango County (3 seats)
- Clinton County (1 seat)
- Columbia County (3 seats)
- Cortland County (2 seats)
- Delaware County (2 seats)
- Dutchess County (3 seats)
- Erie County (3 seats)
- Essex County (1 seat)
- Franklin County (1 seat)
- Genesee County (4 seats)
- Greene County (2 seats)
- Hamilton and Montgomery counties (3 seats)
- Herkimer County (2 seats)
- Jefferson County (3 seats)
- Kings County (2 seats)
- Lewis County (1 seat)
- Livingston County (2 seats)
- Madison County (3 seats)
- Monroe County (3 seats)
- The City and County of New York (13 seats)
- Niagara County (2 seats)
- Oneida County (4 seats)
- Onondaga County (4 seats)
- Ontario County (3 seats)
- Orange County (3 seats)
- Orleans County (1 seat)
- Oswego County (2 seats)
- Otsego County (3 seats)
- Putnam County (1 seat)
- Queens County (1 seat)
- Rensselaer County (3 seats)
- Richmond County (1 seat)
- Rockland County (1 seat)
- St. Lawrence County (2 seats)
- Saratoga County (2 seats)
- Schenectady County (1 seat)
- Schoharie County (2 seats)
- Seneca County (1 seat)
- Steuben County (3 seats)
- Suffolk County (2 seats)
- Sullivan County (1 seat)
- Tioga County (1 seat)
- Tompkins County (2 seats)
- Ulster County (2 seats)
- Warren County (1 seat)
- Washington (2 seats)
- Wayne County (2 seats)
- Westchester County (2 seats)
- Yates County (1 seat)
Note: There are now 62 counties in the State of New York. The counties which are not mentioned in this list had not yet been established, or sufficiently organized, the area being included in one or more of the abovementioned counties.

=== Assemblymen ===
The asterisk (*) denotes members of the previous Legislature who continued as members of this Legislature.

Party affiliations follow the vote on State officers on February 5.

District	Assemblymen	Party	Notes
Albany	Daniel D. Barnard	Whig	in November 1838 elected to the 26th U.S. Congress
Albany	Edmund Raynsford	Whig	
Albany	Paul Settle	Whig	
Allegany	Seth H. Pratt	Whig	
Allegany	Samuel Russell	Whig	
Broome	James Stoddard	Whig	
Cattaraugus	Nelson Green	Whig	
Cattaraugus	Timothy H. Porter	Whig	
Cayuga	Henry R. Filley	Whig	
Cayuga	Isaac S. Miller		
Cayuga	Nathan G. Morgan		
Chautauqua	Thomas I. Allen	Whig	
Chautauqua	George A. French	Whig	
Chautauqua	Abner Lewis	Whig	
Chemung	Hiram White	Democrat	
Chenango	Henry Balcom	Whig	
Chenango	Demas Hubbard, Jr.	Whig	
Chenango	Justus Parce	Whig	
Clinton	Cornelius Halsey*	Democrat	
Columbia	Abraham Bain	Whig	
Columbia	William A. Dean	Whig	
Columbia	William H. Tobey	Whig	
Cortland	David Matthews	Whig	
Cortland	John Osgood	Whig	
Delaware	Cornelius Bassett	Democrat	
Delaware	Darius Mapes		
Dutchess	Cornelius Dubois	Whig	
Dutchess	Freeborn Garretson	Whig	
Dutchess	Jacob Sisson		
Erie	Lewis F. Allen	Whig	
Erie	Asa Warren	Whig	
Erie	Cyrenus Wilbur	Whig	
Essex	Gideon Hammond*	Whig	
Franklin	Luther Bradish*	Whig	elected Speaker; in November 1838 elected Lieutenant Governor of New York
Genesee	Reuben Benham*	Whig	
Genesee	Andrew H. Green	Whig	
Genesee	John Head	Whig	
Genesee	Leverett Seward*	Whig	
Greene	Thomas B. Cooke	Whig	
Greene	Peter Hubbell	Whig	
Hamilton and Montgomery	Jeremiah Nellis	Whig	
Hamilton and Montgomery	Abraham V. Putman		
Hamilton and Montgomery	Marcellus Weston		
Herkimer	Abijah Mann, Jr.	Democrat	
Herkimer	Volney Owen		
Jefferson	Charles B. Hoard	Democrat	also Postmaster of Antwerp
Jefferson	Richard Hulbert*	Democrat	
Jefferson	Daniel Wardwell	Democrat	
Kings	Cornelius Bergen	Whig	
Kings	Benjamin D. Silliman	Whig	
Lewis	William Dominick	Democrat	
Livingston	George W. Patterson*	Whig	
Livingston	William Scott*	Whig	
Madison	William F. Bostwick	Democrat	
Madison	William Lord	Democrat	
Madison	Onesimus Mead	Democrat	
Monroe	John P. Patterson	Whig	
Monroe	Ezra Sheldon Jr.	Whig	
Monroe	Derick Sibley*	Whig	
New York	Alfred Carhart	Whig	
New York	Adoniram Chandler		
New York	Heman W. Childs	Whig	
New York	Evan Griffith	Whig	
New York	Willis Hall	Whig	
New York	William Harsell		
New York	John I. Labagh*	Whig	
New York	David B. Ogden	Whig	
New York	Samuel B. Ruggles	Whig	
New York	John B. Scoles	Whig	
New York	Garret H. Stryker	Whig	
New York	Anson Willis*	Whig	
New York	George Zabriskie*	Whig	
Niagara	Davis Hurd*	Whig	
Niagara	Peter B. Porter, Jr.	Whig	
Oneida	Russel Fuller	Whig	
Oneida	Henry Hearsey	Whig	
Oneida	James S. T. Stranahan		
Oneida	Fortune C. White	Whig	
Onondaga	Victory Birdseye	Whig	
Onondaga	Phares Gould	Whig	
Onondaga	James R. Lawrence	Whig	
Onondaga	Azariah Smith	Whig	
Ontario	Jonathan Buell	Whig	
Ontario	David Hudson	Whig	
Ontario	Henry W. Taylor*	Whig	
Orange	Goldsmith Denniston	Whig	
Orange	Stephen W. Fullerton	Whig	
Orange	Hudson McFarlan	Whig	
Orleans	Horatio Reed	Whig	
Oswego	Arvin Rice	Whig	
Oswego	John M. Richardson	Whig	
Otsego	Samuel Betts Jr.	Democrat	
Otsego	John Drake	Democrat	
Otsego	Jacob K. Lull	Democrat	
Putnam	Saxton Smith	Democrat	
Queens	John A. King	Whig	
Rensselaer	Hezekiah Hull	Whig	
Rensselaer	Jacob A. Ten Eyck	Whig	
Rensselaer	James Wallace	Whig	
Richmond	Israel Oakley		
Rockland	David Clark	Democrat	
St. Lawrence	Preston King*	Democrat	
St. Lawrence	Myron G. Peck	Democrat	
Saratoga	Walter Van Veghten	Whig	
Saratoga	Calvin Wheeler	Whig	
Schenectady	Silas H. Marsh	Whig	
Schoharie	Jedediah Miller		
Schoharie	Mitchell Sanford	Whig	
Seneca	Nathan Wakeman	Democrat	
Steuben	Samuel Griggs	Democrat	
Steuben	David Hall	Democrat	
Steuben	Manning Kelly	Democrat	
Suffolk	Charles A. Floyd	Democrat	
Suffolk	Sidney L. Griffin	Democrat	
Sullivan	John H. Bowers	Democrat	
Tioga	John Coryell	Whig	
Tompkins	Elbert Curtis		
Tompkins	Robert Swartwout	Whig	
Ulster	Benjamin R. Bevier	Whig	
Ulster	James N. Mitchell	Whig	
Warren	Thomas A. Leggett	Democrat	
Washington	Erastus D. Culver	Whig	
Washington	Leonard Gibbs	Whig	
Wayne	Esbon Blackmar	Whig	
Wayne	John M. Holley	Whig	
Westchester	Francis Barretto		
Westchester	Nicholas Cruger		
Yates	Miles Benham	Whig	

=== Employees ===
- Clerk: Jarvis N. Lake
- Sergeant-at-Arms: Harley R. Luddington
- Doorkeeper: William C. Bloss
- Assistant Doorkeeper: Frederick Lamb

== Sources ==
- The New York Civil List compiled by Franklin Benjamin Hough (Weed, Parsons and Co., 1858) [pg. 109 and 441 for Senate districts; pg. 131f for senators; pg. 148f for Assembly districts; pg. 220f for assemblymen]
- The History of Political Parties in the State of New-York, from the Ratification of the Federal Constitution to 1840 by Jabez D. Hammond (4th ed., Vol. 2, Phinney & Co., Buffalo, 1850; pg. 479 to 486)
