= Senator Deyo =

Senator Deyo may refer to:

- Abraham A. Deyo (1793–1873), New York State Senate
- Martin W. Deyo (1902–1951), New York State Senate
