= Henry Hawkins (politician) =

American politician (1790–1845)

Henry Hawkins (August 1790 — October 9, 1845) was an American politician from New York.

== Life ==
He was the son of Rodolphus Hawkins (c. 1758–1847), a soldier in the American Revolutionary War. The family removed about 1791 from Coventry, Connecticut, to Whitestown, New York, and about 1809 to a place in Batavia, located in the area which was separated in 1812 as the Town of Alexander, in Genesee County, New York.

He was an Anti-Masonic member of the New York State Assembly (Genesee Co.) in 1832. He was a Whig member of the New York State Senate (7th D.) from 1839 to 1842, sitting in the 62nd, 63rd, 64th and 65th New York State Legislatures.

The Hawkins family was very active in the town of Alexander. Henry Hawkins helped establish the first library and was among the founders of Alexander Classical School in 1834.

Henry and one of his brothers, Van Rensselaer, formed Hawkins & Company to handle their joint business interests, which included the purchase and sale of lands in New York and Michigan, the formation of the Exchange Bank of Genesee in 1838, the building of the Attica and Buffalo Railroad, and the building and leasing of commercial properties in several local communities.

He died of smallpox, and was buried at the Cemetery in the Village of Alexander.

== Sources ==
- The New York Civil List compiled by Franklin Benjamin Hough (pages 132f, 141, 212 and 280; Weed, Parsons and Co., 1858)
- Abstracts of Revolutionary War Pension records

New York State Senate
Preceded by Isaac Lacey	New York State Senate; Eighth District (Class 4); 1839–1842	Succeeded by Harvey Putnam
