= Leonard Maison =

American lawyer and politician (c. 1790 – c. 1860)

Member of the New York Senate from the 2nd district
- In office 1834–1837
- Preceded by: Nathaniel P. Tallmadge
- Succeeded by: Henry A. Livingston

Personal details
- Born: c. 1790
- Died: c. 1860 (aged c. 70)
- Party: Democratic (Jacksonian)
- Spouse: Helen Emott
- Children: Several, including Rev. Charles Augustus Maison and Belinda Emott Maison Coffin
- Occupation: Lawyer, politician, militia officer

Military service
- Allegiance: United States
- Branch/service: New York State Militia
- Rank: Brigadier General
- Unit: Artillery

Leonard Maison (c. 1790 – c. 1860) was an American lawyer and politician from New York. He served in the New York State Senate from 1834 to 1837 and was a brigadier general of artillery in the New York State Militia.

== Life ==
Maison practiced law at Poughkeepsie, New York. He was a member of the Jacksonian faction of the Democratic Party.

He was a member of the New York State Senate (2nd District) from 1834 to 1837, sitting in the 57th, 58th, 59th, and 60th New York State Legislatures.

In January 1834, Maison delivered a speech in the Senate in favor of joint resolutions approving the removal of deposits from the Bank of the United States and against its recharter.

He was a brigadier general of artillery in the New York State Militia.

== Personal life ==
Maison married Helen Emott, and they had several children, including: Rev. Charles Augustus Maison (1824–1922) and Belinda Emott Maison Coffin (1821–1856), who married Owen T. Coffin.

New York State Senate
Preceded by Nathaniel P. Tallmadge	New York State Senate; 2nd District (Class 3); 1834–1837	Succeeded by Henry A. Livingston
