= James Powers (New York politician) =

American politician

James Powers (October 1785 – January 3, 1868) was an American lawyer and politician from New York.

== Life ==
He was the son of William Powers (c. 1745–1796) and Rhoda (Deane) Powers (1759–1828). He married Nancy Day (1787–1826), and they had three daughters.

He was a member of the New York State Assembly (Greene Co.) in 1816 and 1822.

He was a member of the New York State Senate (3rd D.) from 1836 to 1839, sitting in the 59th, 60th, 61st and 62nd New York State Legislatures.

He was a delegate to the New York State Constitutional Convention of 1846.

He was buried at the Village Cemetery in Catskill.

His daughter Frances (1815–1854) was married to Nelson Beardsley (1807–1894), son of State Senator John Beardsley.

== Sources ==
- The New York Civil List compiled by Franklin Benjamin Hough (pages 58, 131f, 144, 190, 198 and 298; Weed, Parsons and Co., 1858)

New York State Senate
Preceded by John W. Edmonds	New York State Senate; Third District (Class 1); 1836–1839	Succeeded by Erastus Root
