= John Dikeman =

American politician

John Dikeman (March 31, 1795 – August 23, 1879) was an American lawyer, judge, and politician from New York.

== Life ==
Dikeman was born on March 31, 1795, in Hempstead, New York, the son of a small farmer. When he was around 15 or 16, he moved to Brooklyn, then a small village, and worked as a clerk for a store on Fulton Street. He lived in Philadelphia for some time and engaged in business there, although he soon returned to Brooklyn.

In around 1814, Dikeman began to study law under Judge Radcliffe. While studying law, he supported himself by teaching in schools. When Brooklyn's first public school was opened in 1816, he was selected as teacher and principal of the school. When he was called to the bar, he opened a law office near the corner of Henry and Fulton streets.

In 1821, Dikeman was elected village clerk. In 1830, he was appointed judge of the Court of Common Pleas of Kings County. He was initially an active Jacksonian Democrat and played a prominent part in the party in Kings County. In 1835, he was elected to the New York State Assembly under the Native American Party and served in 1836. While in the Assembly, 40 county residents presented a petition to the state legislature asking he be unseated on the grounds he was a clergyman. He was in fact a local preacher, the petition wasn't pressed, and the petitioners withdrew it. In the 1836 United States House of Representatives election, he was the Whig candidate for New York's 2nd congressional district, but he lost to Abraham Vanderveer.

In 1839, when the New York and Brooklyn Ferry Company was organized, Dikeman was one of the new company's original lessees and directors. When the Union Ferry Company was organized in 1844, he was on the board of managers. He left the company after it raised the ferry fee to 2 cents, a measure he opposed. In 1863, he was elected County Judge for Kings County. He lost the re-election in 1867. When the Kings County Inebriates' Home was established that year, he became first vice president of the board of managers.

In 1816, Dikeman married Susan Remsen. They had 9 children. He was a member of the Methodist Episcopal Church.

Dikeman died at home on August 23, 1879. He was buried in Green-Wood Cemetery.
