= James L. Voorhees =

American politician

James L. Voorhees (August 6, 1794 – December 19, 1865) was an American farmer, lumberman, and politician from New York.

== Life ==
Voorhees was born on August 6, 1794, in Charleston, New York. He moved to Lysander in 1810, where he worked as a farmer and lumberman. He served as town supervisor for many years.

In 1830, he unsuccessfully ran for the New York State Assembly as a member of the Anti-Masonic Party. In 1838, he was elected to the Assembly as a Whig and one of the representatives of Onondaga County. He served in the Assembly in 1839. In the 1860 presidential election, he was a presidential elector for Abraham Lincoln and Hannibal Hamlin.

Voorhees was married to Martha Northrup. They had eight children, including Mrs. M. Sophia Austin and J. L. Voorhees.

Voorhees died in Lysander on December 19, 1865. He was buried in the Plainville Rural Cemetery in Plainville.
