= Samuel Works =

American politician

Samuel Works (c. 1781 – January 2, 1868) was an American politician from New York.

== Life ==
He was born December 4, 1781, at Westmoreland, New Hampshire, the son of Samuel Works and Susanna (Chandler) Works. In 1816, he removed to Rochester, New York and was co-owner of a tannery there. In 1826, he was elected Chief Engineer of the Fire Department, and later became Fire Chief and City Superintendent.

In February 1831, he was the Anti-Masonic candidate for U.S. Senator from New York, but was defeated by Jacksonian William L. Marcy. The same year, Works removed to Lockport.

He was a member of the New York State Senate (8th D.) from 1837 to 1844, sitting in the 60th, 61st, 62nd, 63rd, 64th, 65th, 66th and 67th New York State Legislatures.

In November 1844, he ran on the Whig ticket for Canal Commissioner, but the Democratic ticket was elected. In 1850, he was appointed Superintendent of Repairs for Section 12 of the Erie Canal.

He died at his residence in Lockport on January 2, 1868, and was buried at the Cold Springs Cemetery there.

== Sources ==
- The New York Civil List compiled by Franklin Benjamin Hough (pages 131ff and 147; Weed, Parsons and Co., 1858)
- Buffalo City Directory (1850; pg. 75)
- History of the Pioneer Settlement of Phelps and Gorham's Purchase and Morris' Reserve (Rochester NY, 1851; pg. 612) [says "removed from Vermont"]
- Death of Hon. Samuel Works in NYT on January 6, 1868 [says "he was a native of New Hampshire"]

New York State Senate
Preceded by John Griffin	New York State Senate; Eighth District (Class 2); 1837 – 1844	Succeeded by Carlos Emmons
