= Isaac Lacey =

American politician

Isaac Lacey (December 1, 1776 in Litchfield, Litchfield County, Connecticut – April 28, 1844 in Chili Center, Monroe County, New York) was an American politician from New York.

== Life ==
He was the son of Ebenezer Lacey and Mary (Hurd) Lacey.

In 1816, he removed from White Creek, New York to a place in Genesee County which in 1822 became part of the Town of Chili, now in Monroe County.

He was a member of the New York State Assembly (Monroe Co.) in 1826 and 1831.

He was a member of the New York State Senate (8th D.) from 1835 to 1838, sitting in the 58th, 59th, 60th and 61st New York State Legislatures.

He was buried at the Fellows Cemetery in South Chili.

Assemblyman John T. Lacey (b. 1808) was his son.

== Sources ==
- The New York Civil List compiled by Franklin Benjamin Hough (pages 130ff, 142, 204, 211 and 286; Weed, Parsons and Co., 1858)
- Pen and Ink Portraits of Senators, Assemblymen and State Officers of the State of New York by G. W. Bungay (Albany NY, 1857; pg. 38 "JOHN T. LACEY")

New York State Senate
Preceded by Trumbull Cary	New York State Senate; Eighth District (Class 4); 1835–1838	Succeeded by Henry Hawkins
