= David Wager =

American politician (1804–1870)

Member of the New York Senate from the 5th district
- In office 1836–1840
- Preceded by: John G. Stower
- Succeeded by: Henry A. Foster

Personal details
- Born: March 17, 1804
- Died: July 27, 1870 (aged 66)
- Resting place: Forest Hill Cemetery; Utica, New York, U.S.

David Wager (March 17, 1804 – July 27, 1870) was an American politician from New York.

== Life ==
He was a member of the New York State Assembly (Oneida Co.) in 1833 and 1835.

He was a member of the New York State Senate (5th D.) from 1836 to 1840, sitting in the 59th, 60th, 61st, 62nd and 63rd New York State Legislatures.

In 1840, he married Mary Eliza Williams (c. 1811–1904), daughter of Judge Nathan Williams (1773–1835). Their daughter Mary Wager married in 1863 State Senator Alexander T. Goodwin (1837–1899).

Wager died on July 27, 1870. David Wager and his wife were buried at the Forest Hill Cemetery, Utica.

Gen. Henry Halleck (1815–1872) and Bishop Henry Benjamin Whipple (1822–1901) were his nephews. Charles H. Whipple was his grand nephew.

== Sources ==
- The New York Civil List compiled by Franklin Benjamin Hough (pp. 131f, 147, 214, 217 and 313; Weed, Parsons and Co., 1858)
- Death notice of his widow, in NYT on January 4, 1904
- Marriage notice in American Masonic Register and Literary Companion (issue of January 11, 1840; p. 151)
- Genealogy of the Whipple-Wright Wager Ward-Pell Mclean-Burnet Families together with records of Allied Families by Chyarles H. Whipple 1917 p. 56

New York State Senate
Preceded by John G. Stower	New York State Senate; Fifth District (Class 2); 1836–1840	Succeeded by Henry A. Foster
