= Henry H. Van Dyck =

American politician

Henry H. Van Dyck (September 3, 1809 Kinderhook, Columbia County, New York — January 22, 1888 Brooklyn, Kings County, New York) was an American newspaper publisher, financier and politician from New York.

== Life ==
He was the son of Dr. Henry Lawrence (or Hendrick Lourens) Van Dyck (1773–1840) and Catherine (Van Alen) Van Dyck (1775–1863). He became a printer, and in 1830 the editor of the Goshen Independent Republican, a Jacksonian newspaper. In 1832, he bought the newspaper, and sold it after his election to the State Senate.

He married Eliza A. Clark (c. 1810–c. 1862), and they had a son, Henry H. Van Dyck (1839–1859) who was killed in an accident.

He was a member of the New York State Senate (2nd D.) from 1837 to 1840, sitting in the 60th, 61st, 62nd and 63rd New York State Legislatures.

From 1840 to 1842, he was co-owner of the Albany Argus, and from 1842 to 1856 of the Albany Atlas, a Soft Democratic newspaper. In 1856, he joined the Republican Party, and was a presidential elector, voting for John C. Frémont and William L. Dayton.

He was Superintendent of Public Instruction from 1857 to 1861, and Superintendent of the Banking Department from 1861 to 1865. In 1864, he married Frances Augusta Kelly (c. 1840–1916), and they had six children.

In 1865, he was appointed by Abraham Lincoln as Assistant United States Treasurer in New York. He was re-appointed by Andrew Johnson and held office until 1869.

In 1869, he became President of the New York and Boston Railroad, and in 1883 of the American Safe Deposit Company.

He died from kidney disease at his residence at 5 Spencer Place, in Brooklyn, and was buried at the Albany Rural Cemetery in Menands, New York.

Missionary Cornelius Van Alen Van Dyck (1818–1895) was his brother.

== Sources ==
- The New York Civil List compiled by Franklin Benjamin Hough (pages 40, 131f, 146, 323 and 332; Weed, Parsons and Co., 1858)
- DEATH OF HENRY H. VAN DYCK in NYT on January 24, 1888
- Van Dyck genealogy at Family Tree Maker

List of public officials buried at Albany Rural Cemetery

New York State Senate
Preceded by Ebenezer Lounsbery	New York State Senate; Second District (Class 2); 1837–1840	Succeeded by Robert Denniston
Political offices
Preceded by Victor M. Rice	New York State Superintendent of Public Instruction; 1857–1861	Succeeded by Emerson W. Keyes; Acting
