= William Wilbur =

American politician

William Wilbur was an American politician from New York.

He lived in Genoa, New York.

He was a member of the New York State Assembly (Cayuga Co.) in 1836 and 1837.

== Sources ==
- The New York Civil List compiled by Franklin Benjamin Hough (pages 217, 219 and 316; Weed, Parsons and Co., 1858)
