= John Hunter (Westchester County, New York) =

American politician

Member of the New York State Senate Second District (Class 1)
- In office 1836–1843
- Preceded by: Allan Macdonald
- Succeeded by: Joshua B. Smith

Member of the New York State Senate Second District (Class 1)
- In office 1823–1823
- Preceded by: New district
- Succeeded by: William Nelson

Personal details
- Born: August 4, 1778
- Died: September 12, 1852 (aged 74)
- Spouse: Elizabeth Desbrosses (m. 1799; died 1839)
- Children: Elias Desbrosses Hunter
- Education: Columbia College

John Hunter (August 4, 1778 – September 12, 1852) was an American businessman and politician from New York.

== Life ==
He was born on August 4, 1778, the son of auctioneer Robert Hunter (c. 1735–1800) and Ruth (née Breck) Hunter (c. 1757–1840). He had two sisters, Elizabeth (née Hunter) Ludlow (wife of Gabriel Verplank Ludlow, nephew of George Duncan Ludlow) and Ruth (née Hunter) McEvers (wife of James McEvers, business partner of William Bayard Jr.). His father had emigrated from County Armagh in Northern Ireland to New York.

After his father's death, his mother married Lt. Gov. John Broome (under Governors Morgan Lewis and Daniel D. Tompkins) in 1806. Broome died in 1810.

Hunter graduated from Columbia College.

== Career ==
Hunter continued his father's auctioneer and commission business before turning towards politics and selling the auction house at Pearl and Wall Streets in 1810. He was one of the original directors of the Delaware and Hudson Canal in 1823 and served as Supervisor of Westchester County before becoming a member of the New York State Senate (2nd D.) in 1823. He again served from 1836 to 1843, sitting in the 59th, 60th, 61st, 62nd, 63rd, 64th, 65th and 66th New York State Legislatures.

=== Hunter's Island ===
Sometime before 1812, he bought "Appleby's Island", which became afterwards known as Hunter's Island, located off the shore of the Town of Pelham, in Westchester County, and now part of Orchard Beach in the Bronx. Hunter built a large mansion there. Hunter was originally buried on his island estate, but was re-interred in Beechwoods Cemetery in New Rochelle after the estate was sold to Mayor Ambrose Kingsland in 1866.

== Personal life ==
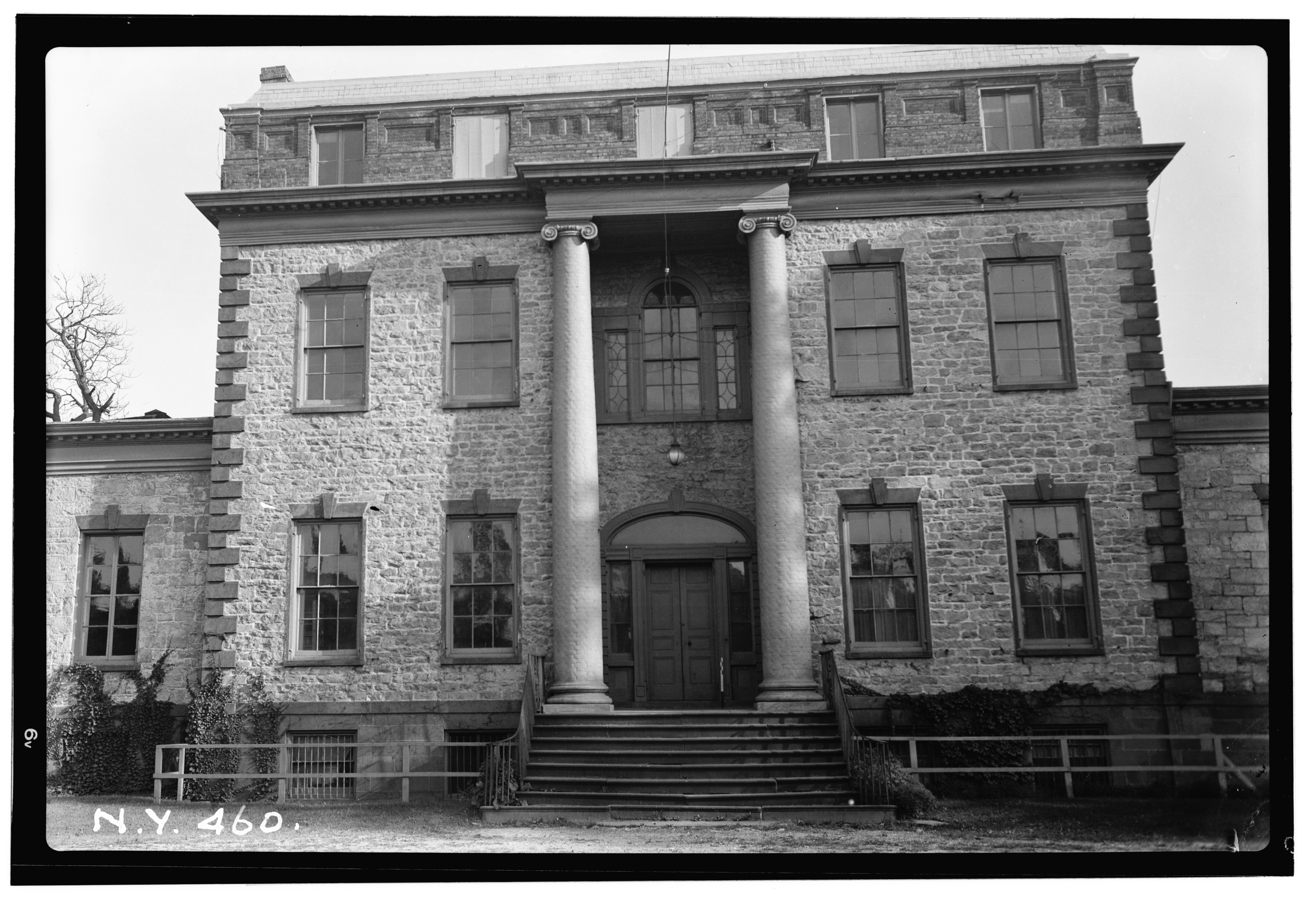
Hunter's mansion

In 1799, he married Elizabeth Desbrosses (d. 1831), a daughter of Elizabeth (née Butler) Desbrosses and James Desbrosses, considered to have been the wealthiest man in New York. Following her father's death, Elizabeth and her sister Charlotte (wife of Henry Overing) divided the 60,000 acres their father had acquired from the 2,000,000 acre Hardenburgh Patent. Before her death in February 1831, John and Elizabeth were the parents of:

- Elias Desbrosses Hunter (1800–1865), who married Anna Maria Munro, a daughter of Margaret (née White) Munro (a granddaughter of Frederick Van Cortlandt) and diplomat Peter Jay Munro of Manor Park (who was a nephew of John Jay), in 1832.

Hunter died on September 12, 1852.

=== Art collection ===
During his lifetime, Hunter amassed a substantial art collection that was considered "the nation's finest private collection of old master art." After Hunter's death and the death of his son Elias, the family gathered his "extensive collection of ancient and modern pictures removed from his gallery and residence at Hunter's Island" and offered the art for sale at an auction administered by Henry H. Leeds & Miner, Auctioneers in January 1866.

=== Descendants ===
Through his son Elias, he was a grandfather of Elias Desbrosses Hunter Jr. (who died young), Elizabeth Desbrosses Hunter (who married William Heathcote DeLancey Jr., son of Bishop William Heathcote DeLancey), Anna Maria Hunter (married Peter Jay Munro Van Cortlandt), Adele Hunter (died unmarried), and John Hunter III (1833–1914), who inherited Hunter's Island and sold it to former mayor Ambrose Kingsland in 1866 for $127,501. John Hunter III married Annie Manigault Middleton of Middleton Place, Charleston, South Carolina.

New York State Senate
Preceded by new district	New York State Senate; Second District (Class 1); 1823	Succeeded by William Nelson
Preceded by Allan Macdonald	New York State Senate; Second District (Class 1); 1836–1843	Succeeded by Joshua B. Smith
