= Henry A. Livingston =

American politician (1776–1849)

Member of the New York Senate from the 2nd district
- In office 1838–1841
- Preceded by: Leonard Maison
- Succeeded by: Abraham Bockee

Member of the New York State Assembly from the Dutchess County district
- In office 1827–1827

Personal details
- Born: Henry Alexander Livingston; August 26, 1776
- Died: June 9, 1849 (aged 72) Poughkeepsie, New York, U.S.
- Resting place: Poughkeepsie Rural Cemetery
- Party: Whig
- Spouses: Elizabeth Beekman (died 1811) Frederika Charlotte Sayers (m. 1811)
- Relations: See Livingston family
- Children: 18
- Parents: John Henry Livingston (father); Sarah Livingston (mother)

Henry Alexander Livingston (August 26, 1776 – June 9, 1849) was an American politician from New York. He served in the New York State Assembly in 1827 and in the New York State Senate from 1838 to 1841. He was a member of the prominent Livingston family.

== Early life and family ==
Livingston was born on August 26, 1776. He was the only child of John Henry Livingston (1746–1825), President of Queen's College, and Sarah (née Livingston) Livingston (1752–1814).

His maternal grandparents were Philip Livingston, a Continental Congressman and signer of the Declaration of Independence, and Christina (née Ten Broeck) Livingston, sister of Albany Mayor Abraham Ten Broeck. Through his mother, he was a first cousin of Lt. Gov. Edward P. Livingston, and his aunt, Helena Livingston (1767–1859), was married to Justice Jonas Platt (1769–1834).

His paternal grandparents were Dr. Henry Livingston and Susannah Storm (née Conklin) Livingston. Through his father, he was the nephew of Continental Congressman Gilbert Livingston, author Henry Livingston Jr. (the grandfather of U.S. Senator Sidney Breese and Admiral Samuel Livingston Breese), and Alida (née Livingston) Woolsey.

He spent his life on the patrimonial estate on the Hudson River near Poughkeepsie, the estate of his grandfather Henry, himself the eldest son of his father, Gilbert, who was the youngest of three sons born to Robert Livingston the Elder, 1st Lord of Livingston Manor and progenitor of the Livingston family in America.

== Political career ==
Livingston was a member of the New York State Assembly (Dutchess County) in 1827, serving in the 50th New York State Legislature.

He was a member of the New York State Senate (2nd District) from 1838 to 1841, sitting in the 61st, 62nd, 63rd, and 64th New York State Legislatures.

== Personal life ==
Livingston married Elizabeth Beekman (1779–1811), the daughter of James Beekman and Jane (née Lefferts) Beekman. Together, they were the parents of nine children, including:

- Sarah Livingston (1797–1818), who married Rev. Brogan Hoff
- Eliza H. Livingston (1799–1819)
- John Alexander Livingston (1801–1865), who married Louisa Ridgeley Bradford (1808–1863) in 1832
- Abraham Henry Livingston, who married Anna T. Greene
- Louisa Matilda Livingston (1807–1849), who married Edward K. James (1803–1860)
- Russell Livingston, who married Louisa B. Finlay

After his first wife's death in 1811, Livingston married Frederika Charlotte Sayers (1797–1870), the daughter of James and Euphemia Sayers, who was born in Bath, England. Together, they were the parents of nine more children, including:

- Robert Sayers Livingston (1819–1821)
- Frederica Charlotte Livingston (d. 1898), who married Washington Kendrick (d. 1881)
- Cornelia Beekman Livingston (d. 1858)
- Christina Ten Broeck Livingston (d. 1858)
- Jane Murray Livingston (1830–1911), who married Robert Ralston Crosby (1815–1892), brother of Clarkson F. Crosby
- Henrietta Ulrica Livingston (d. 1916)
- Henry Philip Livingston (d. 1861)
- Augustus Linlithgow Livingston (1839–1911), who married Elizabeth Matilda Danforth (1843–1916)

== Death ==
Livingston died on June 9, 1849, in Poughkeepsie, Dutchess County, New York. He was buried at the Poughkeepsie Rural Cemetery.

New York State Senate
Preceded by Leonard Maison	New York State Senate; 2nd District (Class 3); 1838–1841	Succeeded by Abraham Bockee
