= Daniel Johnson (New York politician) =

American politician

Daniel Johnson (January 2, 1790 – February 26, 1875) was an American politician from New York.

== Life ==
He was the son of Gilbert Johnson and Phebe (Gurnee) Johnson. On December 6, 1819, he married Hannah Coe (1794–1862), and their son was Erastus Johnson (1820–1908).

Daniel Johnson served as a member of the New York State Assembly (Rockland Co.) in 1834 and 1836.

He was a member of the New York State Senate (2nd D.) from 1839 to 1842, sitting in the 62nd, 63rd, 64th and 65th New York State Legislatures.

He was a presidential elector in 1844, voting for James K. Polk and George M. Dallas.

Johnson died in Ramapo, New York, and was buried at the Summit Park Cemetery in Spring Valley, New York.

== Sources ==
- The New York Civil List compiled by Franklin Benjamin Hough (pages 132f, 142, 215, 218, 284, 322 and 330; Weed, Parsons and Co., 1858)
- Robert Coe, Puritan, His ancestors and Descendants by Joseph Gardner Bartlett (pg. 120)

New York State Assembly
Preceded by James D. L. Montanya	New York State Assembly; Rockland Co. 1834	Succeeded by Edward Suffern
New York State Senate
Preceded by Edward Suffern	New York State Assembly; Rockland Co. 1836	Succeeded by Abraham J. Demarest
New York State Senate
Preceded by John P. Jones	New York State Senate; Second District (Class 4); 1839–1842	Succeeded by Abraham A. Deyo
