= Samuel L. Edwards =

American politician

Samuel Lynson Edwards (February 14, 1789 in Fairfield, Fairfield County, Connecticut – April 7, 1877 in Manlius, Onondaga County, New York) was an American lawyer and politician from New York.

== Life ==
He was the son of Samuel Edwards and Jane (Shelton) Edwards. He graduated from Yale College in 1812. Then he studied law at Manlius, was admitted to the bar in 1815, and practiced there. On May 12, 1819, he married Harriet Bristol, and they had two children.

He was Town Clerk of Manlius from 1821 to 1823. He was a member of the New York State Assembly (Onondaga Co.) in 1823 and 1824. He was Supervisor of the Town of Manlius in 1826 and 1827. He was First Judge of the Onondaga County Court from 1831 to 1833. In 1832, he married Julia Gorham (d. 1864).

He was a member of the New York State Senate (7th D.) from 1833 to 1840, sitting in the 56th, 57th, 58th, 59th, 60th, 61st, 62nd and 63rd New York State Legislatures.

He was again Supervisor of the Town of Manlius from 1847 to 1849.

== Sources ==
- The New York Civil List compiled by Franklin Benjamin Hough (pages 129ff, 140, 200f, 272, 362 and 448; Weed, Parsons and Co., 1858)
- Obituary Record of Yale Graduates (1877; pg. 241)

New York State Senate
Preceded by Hiram F. Mather	New York State Senate; Seventh District (Class 2); 1833–1840	Succeeded by Elijah Rhoades
