= Chauncey J. Fox =

American politician

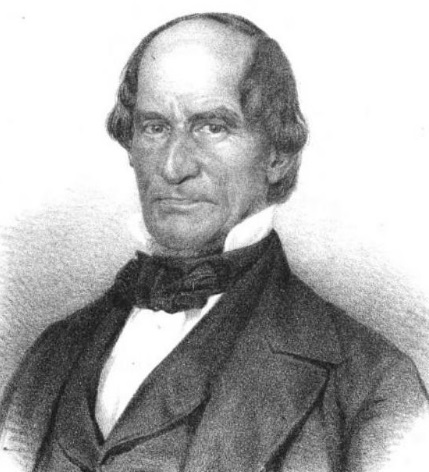
Chauncey J. Fox, New York State Senator.

Chauncey Johnston Fox (August 21, 1797, in Tolland County, Connecticut – February 11, 1883) was an American politician from New York.

== Life ==
He was the son of Thomas Fox (1770–1811) and Chloe (Bradley) Fox (1777–1852). In August 1818, Chauncey and his brother Pliny went to Olean, New York. They did not find any way to make a living and decided to go in a little boat to Cincinnati, but after two days on the Allegheny River met a settler in the woods, and stayed in his employ. A few months later, Fox went to Great Valley, New York, and became a lumberman. Finding the work too hard, he abandoned lumbering, studied law with John A. Bryan instead, was admitted to the bar in 1826, and practiced in Ellicottville. On February 18, 1827, he married Hannah Hurlburt (1808–1896), and they had five children.

He was a member of the New York State Assembly (Cattaraugus Co.) in 1833 and 1834.

He was a member of the New York State Senate (8th D.) from 1835 to 1839, sitting in the 58th, 59th, 60th, 61st and 62nd New York State Legislatures. In the Senate he advocated the construction of the Genesee Valley Canal which was authorized by the Legislature in 1836.

He retired from the bar in 1848, and pursued agricultural interests on a farm near Ellicottville.

He was buried at the Jefferson Street Cemetery in Ellicottville.

== Sources ==
- The New York Civil List compiled by Franklin Benjamin Hough (pages 130ff, 141, 213, 215 and 274; Weed, Parsons and Co., 1858)
- Bio and portrait in Old Pioneers and Congressmen of Cattaraugus County compiled by John Manley (Little Valley NY, 1857; pg. 74ff) [gives August 21 as birthday]
- Cemetery records at Painted Hills [gives August 17 as birthday]
- Bradley genealogy at Bradley Foundation

New York State Assembly
Preceded by George A. S. Crooker	New York State Assembly; Cattaraugus Co. 1833–1834	Succeeded by Albert G. Burke
New York State Senate
Preceded by John Birdsall	New York State Senate; Eighth District (Class 1); 1835–1839	Succeeded by Abram Dixon
