= David Spraker =

American politician

David Spraker (February 23, 1801 Stone Arabia, Montgomery County, New York — October 14, 1873) was an American lawyer and politician from New York.

== Life ==
He was the son of Jost Spraker (1765–1848) and Catherine (Fraser) Spraker (1767–1843). He graduated from Union College in 1822. Then he studied law with Marcus T. Reynolds in Amsterdam, with Alfred Conkling in Albany and with Daniel Cady in Johnstown; was admitted to the bar in 1825; and commenced practice in Canajoharie. Until 1835, he was an associate judge of the Montgomery County Court.

He was a member of the New York State Senate (4th D.) from 1836 to 1839, sitting in the 59th, 60th, 61st and 62nd New York State Legislatures.

In 1845, he married Harriet F. Rowan (c. 1825–1907), and they had six children.

He was Postmaster of Canajoharie; a delegate to the 1860 Democratic National Conventions in Charleston and Baltimore; and President of the Canajoharie Academy, and the Montgomery County Insurance Company.

== Sources ==
- The New York Civil List compiled by Franklin Benjamin Hough (pages 131f and 145; Weed, Parsons and Co., 1858)
- Caucuses of 1860 by M. Halstead (Columbus OH, 1860; pg. 14)
- Post Office Directory (1856; pg. 115)
- David Spraker Bio transcribed from The Illustrated History of Montgomery and Fulton Counties (1878); at NY Gen Web
- Spraker genealogy at Family Tree Maker

New York State Senate
| Preceded by Josiah Fisk | New York State Senate; Fourth District (Class 1); 1836–1839 | Succeeded by James G. Hopkins |
