= John Patterson Jones =

American politician

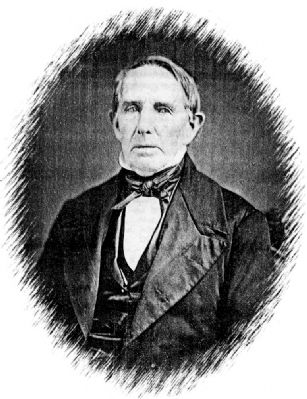
- Jones in 1820

Member of the New York State Senate from the Second district
- In office January 1, 1835 – December 31, 1838
- Preceded by: David M. Westcott
- Succeeded by: Daniel Johnson

Personal details
- Born: 1779 Goshen, Connecticut
- Died: 1856 (aged 76–77) Monticello, New York

John Patterson Jones (1779–1858) was an American politician from New York. He is well known for being the co founder of Monticello, New York and one of its most early residents.

== Life ==
Jones was born in Goshen, Litchfield County, Connecticut in 1779. His family moved to New Lebanon, New York when John was still a child. In 1804, Jones built the first house in what later became the Village of Monticello. He was Postmaster of Monticello for nearly 40 years.

He married Phoebe Ecker (c. 1785–1840), and they had five children. He was County Clerk of Sullivan County from 1809 to 1810, 1811 to 1813 and from 1815 to 1825.

He was a member of the New York State Senate (2nd D.) from 1835 to 1838, sitting in the 58th, 59th, 60th and 61st New York State Legislatures.

After the death of his first wife, he married Charlotte Elizabeth Andrews (c. 1792–1858). He was a presidential elector in 1856, voting for John C. Frémont and William L. Dayton.

He died in 1858 and was buried at the St. John Street Cemetery in Monticello.

== Sources ==
- The New York Civil List compiled by Franklin Benjamin Hough (pages 130f, 142, 323, 332 and 394; Weed, Parsons and Co., 1858)
- Portrait and a picture of his house in Monticello by Tom Rue ("Images of America" series, Arcadia Publishing, Charleston SC, 2010; pg. 10f; ISBN 978-0-7385-7328-1)
- Table of Post Offices in the United States (1813; pg. 47)
- List of Post Offices in the United States (1828; pg 75)

New York State Senate
Preceded by David M. Westcott	New York State Senate; Second District (Class 4); 1835–1838	Succeeded by Daniel Johnson
