= Robert Denniston =

American lawyer and politician

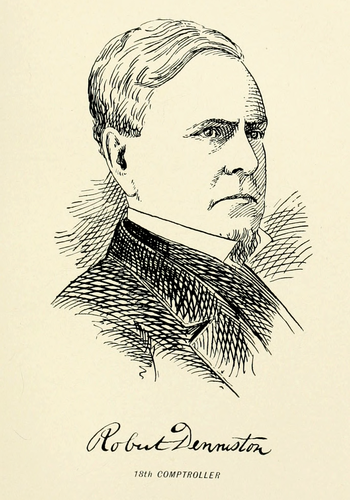
Robert Denniston

Robert Denniston (October 15, 1800, in Blooming Grove, Orange County, New York – December 2, 1867, in Salisbury Mills, Orange County, New York) was an American lawyer and politician.

== Life ==
He was the son of James Denniston (ca. 1770–1825) and Prudence Morrison Denniston. On September 24, 1823, he married Julianna Howell (d. 1825). Afterwards he married Mary Scott, and they had five sons and six daughters.

He served as an officer of the New York State Militia and as a Justice of the Peace in Blooming Grove. He was appointed by Governor William L. Marcy to be a judge of the Court of Common Pleas of Orange County.

He was a Democratic member of the New York State Assembly (Orange Co.) in 1835, 1839 and 1840.

He was a member of the New York State Senate (2nd D.) from 1841 to 1847, sitting in the 64th, 65th, 66th, 67th, 68th, 69th and 70th New York State Legislatures. In the Senate, he was Chairman of the Committee on Canals.

As a Republican, he ran for New York State Comptroller in 1857 but was defeated by Democrat Sanford E. Church. He ran again in 1859 and was elected, being in office from 1860 to 1861.

== Sources ==
- Bio from History of The Town of New Windsor, Orange County, N.Y. by Edward M. Ruttenber (Newburgh NY, 1911, printed for The Historical Society of Newburgh Bay and the Highlands), at netcom
- Obit from Albany Evening Journal, in NYT on December 8, 1867
- Political Graveyard
- Political Graveyard (doubled entry, giving surname as Dennison)
- Google Books The New York Civil List compiled by Franklin Benjamin Hough (pages 140, 269f; Weed, Parsons and Co., 1858)

New York State Senate
Preceded by Henry H. Van Dyck	New York State Senate; Second District (Class 2); 1841–1847	Succeeded by district abolished
Political offices
Preceded by Sanford E. Church	New York State Comptroller; 1860–1861	Succeeded by Lucius Robinson
