= John Beardsley (New York politician) =

American politician

John Beardsley (November 9, 1783 – May 11, 1857) was an American farmer, merchant, banker and politician from New York.

== Life ==
He was born on November 9, 1783, in Southbury, Connecticut, the son of Eliakim Beardsley (1744–1798) and Esther (Sherman) Beardsley (1748–1822). On December 16, 1804, he married Alice Booth (1786–1877), and they had twelve children. In 1808, the family removed to that part of the Town of Scipio, New York, which was in 1823 separated as the Town of Venice. From 1820 to 1823, he was an associate judge of the Cayuga County Court.

He was a member of the New York State Assembly (Cayuga Co.) in 1832 and 1833. In 1836, he removed to Auburn, and was President of the Cayuga County Bank until 1843.

He was a member of the New York State Senate (7th D.) from 1836 to 1839, sitting in the 59th, 60th, 61st and 62nd New York State Legislatures.

From 1843 to 1845, he was Agent of Auburn State Prison.

He died on May 11, 1857, in Auburn, New York; and was buried at the Fort Hill Cemetery there.

His son Nelson Beardsley (1807–1894), law partner of William H. Seward from 1831 to 1842, was married to Frances Powers (1815–1854), daughter of State Senator James Powers.

His son Roswell Beardsley (1809–1902) was for 74 years Postmaster of North Lansing, appointed by John Quincy Adams on June 28, 1828, and died in office as the oldest postmaster in the United States.

New York State Senate
Preceded by Jehiel H. Halsey	New York State Senate; Seventh District (Class 1); 1836–1839	Succeeded by Mark H. Sibley
