= George Huntington (politician, born 1796) =

American politician

Member of the New York State Senate from the 6th district
- In office 1836–1839

Personal details
- Born: August 24, 1796 Mansfield, Connecticut
- Died: November 19, 1866 (aged 70) Bath, New York
- Spouse: Anna Neally (m. 1819)

George Huntington (August 24, 1796 – November 19, 1866) was an American farmer and politician from New York.

== Life ==
He was the son of Jonas Huntington (1754–1830) and Rhoda (Baldwin) Huntington (1758–1824). On May 15, 1819, he married Anna Neally, and the couple settled at Bath NY. They had no children.

He was Sheriff of Steuben County from 1832 to 1834.

He was a member of the New York State Senate (6th D.) from 1836 to 1839, sitting in the 59th, 60th, 61st and 62nd New York State Legislatures.

In 1840, he was appointed Marshal to take the U.S. Census in Steuben County, and later was a Justice of the Peace in Bath.

== Sources ==
- The New York Civil List compiled by Franklin Benjamin Hough (pages 131f, 142 and 407; Weed, Parsons and Co., 1858)
- A Genealogical Memoir of the Huntington Family in This Country by Elijah Baldwin Huntington (Stamford CT, 1863; pg. 219)

New York State Senate
Preceded by John G. McDowell	New York State Senate; Sixth District (Class 1); 1836–1839	Succeeded by Andrew B. Dickinson
