= Alvah Hunt =

American politician (died 1858)

Alvah Hunt (c. 1798 Seekonk, Bristol County, Massachusetts – October 28, 1858 New York City) was an American merchant and politician.

== Life ==
He lived at Greene, Chenango County, New York, where he married Anna Birdsall (d. 1878).

He was a member of the New York State Senate (6th D.) from 1839 to 1842, sitting in the 62nd, 63rd, 64th and 65th New York State Legislatures. He was New York State Treasurer from 1848 to 1851, elected on the Whig ticket in November 1847 and re-elected in November 1849. Afterward he moved to New York City and became Treasurer of the Des Moines Improvement Company.

== Sources ==
- Obit in NYT, on October 29, 1858 (giving wrong location of Seekonk, and wrong year of Treasurer election)
- Political Graveyard
- The New York Civil List compiled by Franklin Benjamin Hough (pages 35f and 142; Weed, Parsons and Co., 1858)
- Chenango County history

New York State Senate
Preceded by Levi Beardsley	New York State Senate; Sixth District (Class 4); 1839–1842	Succeeded by Calvin T. Chamberlain
Political offices
Preceded by Thomas Farrington	New York State Treasurer; 1848–1851	Succeeded by James M. Cook
