= Abraham A. Deyo =

American politician (1793–1873)

Abraham A. Deyo (June 25, 1793 – March 20, 1873) was an American politician from New York.

== Life ==
He was the son of Capt. Abraham Deyo (1736–1805) and Maria (née LeFevre, widowed LeFevre) Deyo (1756–1793). His mother's first husband, Isaac LeFevre, was her second cousin. The Deyo and LeFevre families were early Huguenot settlers of Ulster County and helped found New Paltz, New York, after escaping religious persecution in France. He is a descendant of six Patentees, or founders, of New Paltz: Louis DuBois (Huguenot), Abraham Hasbrouck, Simon LeFevre, Jean Hasbrouck, Pierre Deyo and Christian Deyo. He was a direct descendant of the Hasbrouck family.

He lived in Modena, New York. He was an associate judge of the Ulster County Court. He was for many years Supervisor of the Town of Plattekill, serving from 1835 to 1839 and 1841 to 1842.

He was a member of the New York State Senate (2nd D.) from 1843 to 1846, sitting in the 66th, 67th, 68th and 69th New York State Legislatures.

He was buried at the Modena Community Cemetery.

== Personal life ==
On June 10, 1812, he married Margaret T. Deyo, who was his first cousin once removed through the Deyo family. They had four children, including Abraham A. Deyo Jr. (1819–1883) who was a two-time Postmaster of New Paltz (1845 to 1849 and 1853 to 1858), Ulster County Sheriff (1858), and Town of Kingston supervisor from 1870 to 1871. His great-grandson, Abraham Deyo Brodhead, inherited the historical Deyo House in New Paltz, and owned it from 1890 until around 1910. Another son, John Brodhead Deyo, was postmaster of Modena for three separate terms (1857 to 1860, 1866 to 1867 and 1872 to 1889).

== Sources ==
- The New York Civil List compiled by Franklin Benjamin Hough (pages 134f, 140, 202, 204 and 273; Weed, Parsons and Co., 1858)
- History of New Paltz (Albany, 1909; reprinted 1996; pg. 264ff)
- The New York Annual Register by Edwin Williams (1833; pg. 297)
- Deyo genealogy at RootsWeb
- Bio and Portrait (oil painting) at Hudson River Valley Heritage

New York State Senate
Preceded by Daniel Johnson	New York State Senate; Second District (Class 4); 1843–1846	Succeeded by Harvey R. Morris
