= Ebenezer Lounsbery =

American politician

Ebenezer Lounsbery (c. 1787 — October 8, 1868 Kingston, Ulster County, New York) was an American politician from New York.

== Life ==
He married Maria Hardenburgh, and they had three children.

He was a member of the New York State Senate (2nd D.) in 1836.

== Sources ==
- The New York Civil List compiled by Franklin Benjamin Hough (pages 131 and 143; Weed, Parsons and Co., 1858)

New York State Senate
| Preceded by John Sudam | New York State Senate; Second District (Class 2); 1836 | Succeeded by Henry H. Van Dyck |
