= Laurens Hull =

American politician

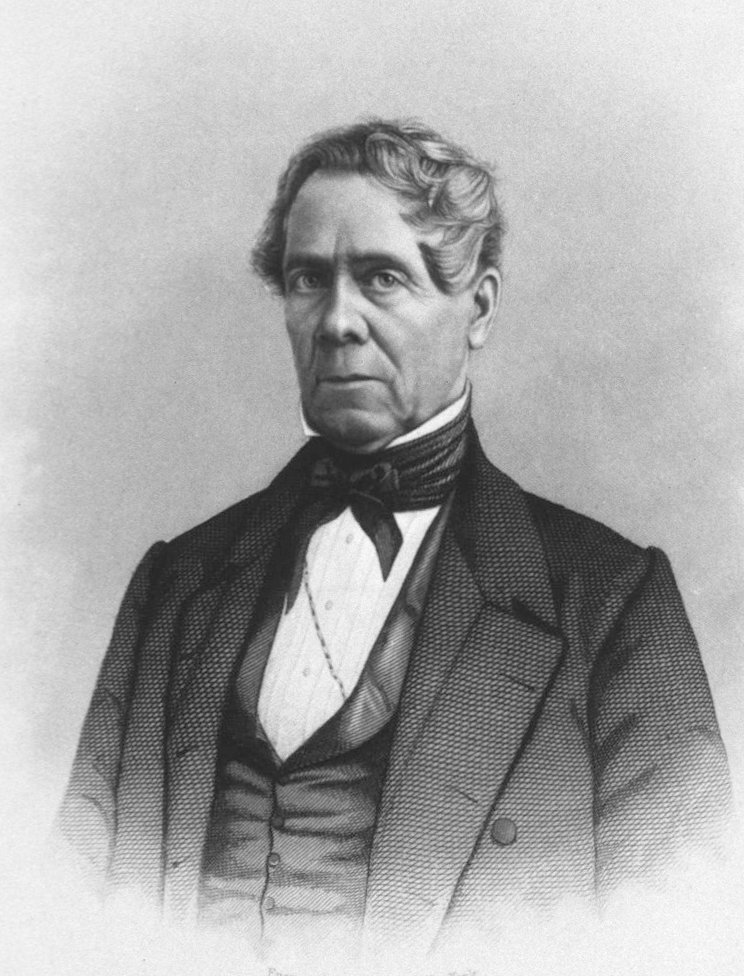
- Laurens Hull
- Born: June 6, 1779; Woodbury, Connecticut, U.S.
- Died: June 27, 1865 (aged 86); Angelica, New York, U.S.
- Occupation: American politician

Laurens Hull (June 6, 1779 – June 27, 1865) was an American medical doctor and politician from New York State.

== Life ==
He was the son of Dr. Titus Hull (1751–1817) and Olive (Lewis) Hull (1754–1812). He was born in a part Woodbury that later became the Town of Bethlehem in 1787, in Litchfield County, Connecticut. He studied medicine, and was licensed to practice in May 1802. Half a year later he removed to Augusta, New York, and practiced medicine there with Dr. Amos G. Hull. In 1803, he married Dorcas Ambler (1780–1858), and they had several children. In September 1804, he removed to Bridgewater, and practiced medicine there on his own.

He was a member of the New York State Assembly (Oneida Co.) in 1814 and 1826. In 1827, he received the honorary degree of M.D. from the University of the State of New York. In 1836, he removed to Angelica, New York, abandoned the practice of medicine, and went into manufacturing instead.

He was a member of the New York State Senate (6th D.) from 1838 to 1841, sitting in the 61st, 62nd, 63rd and 64th New York State Legislatures. He was President of the New York State Medical Society in 1839 and 1840.

He died in Angelica, and was buried at the Until the Day Dawn Cemetery there.

Andrew C. Hull, First Judge of the Allegany County Court from 1833 to 1838, was his brother.

== Sources ==
- The New York Civil List compiled by Franklin Benjamin Hough (pages 132f, 145, 212, 214 and 304; Weed, Parsons and Co., 1858)
- History of Ancient Woodbury, Connecticut by William Cothren (Waterbury CT, 1854; pg. 443f)

New York State Senate
| Preceded by Ebenezer Mack | New York State Senate; Sixth District (Class 3); 1838–1841 | Succeeded by James Faulkner |
