= Chester Loomis =

American politician

Chester Loomis (December 25, 1789 – December 18, 1873) was an American merchant and politician from New York.

== Life ==
He was the son of Nathan Loomis (1762–1850) and Dorcas (Pratt) Loomis. He was born in that part of Whitestown, then located in Montgomery County, which in 1792 was separated as the Town of Westmoreland, now in Oneida County, New York. The family removed to Augusta, New York, in 1793. Chester Loomis attended school in Peterboro, New York, and afterwards became a clerk in Canandaigua.

On October 19, 1815, he married Hannah Hobart (1791–1865), and they had several children, among them Michigan State Senator Charles A. Loomis (1816–1898). Chester Loomis was Postmaster of Rushville, New York, from 1818 to 1841. In 1827, he was appointed an associate judge of the Ontario County Court.

He was a member of the New York State Senate (7th D.) from 1835 to 1838, sitting in the 58th, 59th, 60th and 61st New York State Legislatures.

He died in Rushville, and was buried at the Rushville Village Cemetery in Ontario County, New York.

== Sources ==
- The New York Civil List compiled by Franklin Benjamin Hough (pages 130ff and 143; Weed, Parsons and Co., 1858)
- List of Post Offices in the United States (1828; pg. 102)
- Descendants of Joseph Loomis in America by Charles Arthur Hoppin (E. S. Loomis, 1909; pg. 345)
- The New York State Register (1831; pg. 223)
- Family of Nathan Loomis, transcribed from History and Directory of Yates County, New York] ed. by Stafford C. Cleveland (Penn Yan NY, 1873; Vol. 2, pg. 797-801), at Ancestry.com
- Death notice in Yates County Chronicle (issue of December 25, 1873) transcribed at Yates County
- Rushville Cemetery records at Yates County

New York State Senate
Preceded by William H. Seward	New York State Senate; Seventh District (Class 4); 1835–1838	Succeeded by Robert C. Nicholas
