= Ebenezer Mack =

American politician (1791–1849)

Ebenezer Mack (May 9, 1791 Kinderhook Landing, Columbia County, New York – July 19, 1849 Ithaca, Tompkins County, New York) was an American printer, newspaper publisher and politician from New York.

== Life ==
He was the son of Stephen Mack who died in 1814 as First Judge of the Broome County Court.

Ebenezer Mack was a printer, and co-published the Owego Gazette from 1815 to 1816, and the Ithaca American Journal from 1817 to 1823.

On February 9, 1820, he married Eleanor Dey (1800–1882), and they had several children. He was a trustee of the Village of Ithaca in 1823, and was a member of the New York State Assembly (Tompkins Co.) in 1830.

He was a member of the New York State Senate (6th D.) from 1834 to 1837, sitting in the 57th, 58th, 59th and 60th New York State Legislatures.

In 1841, he published The Life of Gilbert Motier de La Fayette (Mack, Andrus & Woodruff, Ithaca NY; 371 pages; on-line copy).

He died of consumption, and was buried at the City Cemetery in Ithaca NY.

== Sources ==
- The New York Civil List compiled by Franklin Benjamin Hough (pages 130f, 143, 210 and 289; Weed, Parsons and Co., 1858)
- The History of the Treman, Tremaine, Truman Family in America by Ebenezer Mack Treman & Murray Edward Poole (Ithaca NY, 1901; Vol. 1, pg. 103 and 394)
- Marriage notice in The Ladies Literary Cabinet (issue of March 11, 1820; pg. 144)

New York State Senate
Preceded by Levi Beardsley	New York State Senate; Sixth District (Class 3); 1834–1837	Succeeded by Laurens Hull
