= Levi Beardsley =

American lawyer and politician

Levi Beardsley (November 13, 1785 – March 19, 1857) was an American lawyer and politician from New York.

He was the son of Obadiah Beardsley (1763–1841) and Eunice (Moore) Beardsley (1765–1811). He was born on the Beardsley's farm where most of the Battle of Bennington was fought in August 1777. At the time of Beardsley's birth, the area belonged to the District of Hoosick in Albany County, and since 1791 has been in the Town of Hoosick in Rensselaer County.

In 1790, the family removed to a farm in an area which became part of the Town of Richfield, Otsego County, in 1792.

In 1810, he removed to Cherry Valley and studied law there with Jabez D. Hammond. Beardsley was admitted to the bar in 1812, and practiced in partnership with Hammond until 1822. On July 4, 1813, Beardsley married Elizabeth Raymond (1790–1864), and they had several children.

He was a member of the New York State Assembly (Otsego Co.) in 1826.

He was a member of the New York State Senate (6th D.) from 1830 to 1833, and from 1835 to 1838, sitting in the 53rd, 54th, 55th, 56th, 58th, 59th, 60th and 61st New York State Legislatures.

In 1839, he removed to Oswego and became President of the Commercial Bank there, but the bank—in the wake of the Panic of 1837—went bankrupt and was liquidated in 1841.

In 1842, he removed to Columbus, Ohio, and pursued agricultural interests there. After a big fire destroyed his farm, he sold the lands and removed to New York City in 1846. There he resumed the practice of law, and ran in 1847 for the New York Supreme Court, but was defeated.

In 1852, he published his Reminiscences (on-line version; 575 pg.).

He died in Oswego and was buried at the Riverside Cemetery in Scriba, New York. The president of the Orleans County Historical Association, Al Capurso, believes that Beardsley Creek was named after him.

Chief Justice Samuel Beardsley (1790–1860) was his brother, and Clergyman John Beardsley (1732–1809) was his great-uncle.

== Sources ==
- The New York Civil List compiled by Franklin Benjamin Hough (pages 128ff, 138, 204, 258; Weed, Parsons and Co., 1858)
- Tombstone transcriptions from Riverside Cemetery at RootsWeb

New York State Senate
Preceded by Peter Hager 2d	New York State Senate; Sixth District (Class 3); 1830–1833	Succeeded by Ebenezer Mack
Preceded by Charles W. Lynde	New York State Senate; Sixth District (Class 4); 1835–1838	Succeeded by Alvah Hunt
