= 73rd New York State Legislature =

New York state legislative session

←	72nd	74th	→
- The Old State Capitol (1879)

Overview
- Legislative body: New York State Legislature
- Jurisdiction: New York, United States
- Term: January 1 – December 31, 1850

Senate
- Members: 32
- President: Lt. Gov. George W. Patterson (W)
- Temporary President: James M. Cook (W), from April 9
- Party control: Whig (17-15)

Assembly
- Members: 128
- Speaker: Noble S. Elderkin (D), left on January 26; Robert H. Pruyn (W), Acting, from January 28 to March 13; Ferral C. Dininny (D), Acting, from March 13
- Party control: Democratic (65-63)

Sessions
- 1st: January 1 – April 10, 1850

The 73rd New York State Legislature, consisting of the New York State Senate and the New York State Assembly, met from January 1 to April 10, 1850, during the second year of Hamilton Fish's governorship, in Albany.

== Background ==
Under the provisions of the New York Constitution of 1846, 32 Senators were elected in single-seat senatorial districts for a two-year term, the whole Senate being renewed biennially. The senatorial districts (except those in New York City) were made up of entire counties. 128 Assemblymen were elected in single-seat districts to a one-year term, the whole Assembly being renewed annually. The Assembly districts were made up of entire towns, or city wards, forming a contiguous area, all in the same county. The City and County of New York was divided into four senatorial districts, and 16 Assembly districts.

At this time there were two major political parties: the Democratic Party and the Whig Party. After the split in 1848, the Democratic factions (see Barnburners and Hunkers and Free Soil Party) held separate state conventions, but ran joint tickets. The Anti-Rent Party mostly endorsed Whig or Democratic nominees, and was the balance of power at this election.

== Elections ==
The 1849 New York state election was held on November 6. The eight statewide elective offices up for election were carried by 4 Whigs, 3 Hunkers and 1 Barnburner, all of whom had been endorsed by the Anti-Renters.

17 Whigs and 15 Democrats were elected to a two-year term in the State Senate (1850–1851). 64 Whigs and 64 Democrats were declared elected to the State Assembly, resulting in a "split Assembly."

== Sessions ==
The Legislature met for the regular session at the Old State Capitol in Albany on January 1, 1850; and adjourned on April 10.

64 Democrats and 64 Whigs appeared at the opening of the session, constituting a "split assembly." The election of Daniel Fullerton (W) was contested, and objections were raised to his taking the seat. In view of the precedent of 1816 (see 39th New York State Legislature#Sessions), upon taking his seat, Fullerton "claimed to have been fairly, legally and equitably chosen," but "not desiring to cause any delay or embarrassment in the organization of the House," he "declined to vote or take any part in the election of officers of the House." Noble S. Elderkin (D) was elected Speaker with 63 votes against 62 for Robert H. Pruyn (W). Elderkin and Pruyn did not vote, as the candidates traditionally did not vote for themselves. After much haggling, James R. Rose (D) was elected Clerk of the Assembly with 64 votes against 63 for the incumbent Philander B. Prindle (W).

On January 24, leave of absence for two weeks was granted to Speaker Elderkin to go home to his ill wife

On January 26, Robert H. Pruyn was chosen, by unanimous consent, Speaker pro tempore to preside over the Assembly during the absence of Speaker Elderkin who was expected to return at some later time, but did not appear again during the remainder of the session.

On February 26, Daniel T. Durland (D) was seated in place of Fullerton (W) which ended the "split Assembly" and gave the Democrats a nominal majority of 2. Due to the absence of Speaker Elderkin, de facto the Whigs had a majority of 1, which was inverted after seating Durland.

On March 13, Ferral C. Dininny (D) was elected Speaker pro tempore, to succeed Pruyn, to preside over the Assembly during the continued absence of Speaker Elderkin who was by then not expected to return during this session.

== State Senate ==
=== Districts ===
- 1st District: Queens, Richmond and Suffolk counties
- 2nd District: Kings County
- 3rd District: 1st, 2nd, 3rd, 4th, 5th and 6th wards of New York City
- 4th District: 7th, 10th, 13th and 17th wards of New York City
- 5th District: 8th, 9th and 14th wards of New York City
- 6th District: 11th, 12th, 15th, 16th, 18th, 19th, 20th, 21st and 22nd wards of New York City
- 7th District: Putnam, Rockland and Westchester counties
- 8th District: Columbia and Dutchess counties
- 9th District: Orange and Sullivan counties
- 10th District: Greene and Ulster counties
- 11th District: Albany and Schenectady counties
- 12th District: Rensselaer County
- 13th District: Saratoga and Washington counties
- 14th District: Clinton, Essex and Warren counties
- 15th District: Franklin and St. Lawrence counties
- 16th District: Fulton, Hamilton, Herkimer and Montgomery counties
- 17th District: Delaware and Schoharie counties
- 18th District: Chenango and Otsego counties
- 19th District: Oneida County
- 20th District: Madison and Oswego counties
- 21st District: Jefferson and Lewis counties
- 22nd District: Onondaga County
- 23rd District: Broome, Cortland and Tioga counties
- 24th District: Cayuga and Wayne counties
- 25th District: Seneca, Tompkins and Yates counties
- 26th District: Chemung and Steuben counties
- 27th District: Monroe County
- 28th District: Genesee, Niagara and Orleans counties
- 29th District: Livingston and Ontario counties
- 30th District: Allegany and Wyoming counties
- 31st District: Erie County
- 32nd District: Cattaraugus and Chautauqua counties
Note: There are now 62 counties in the State of New York. The counties which are not mentioned in this list had not yet been established, or sufficiently organized, the area being included in one or more of the abovementioned counties.

=== Members ===
The asterisk (*) denotes members of the previous Legislature who continued in office as members of this Legislature. John A. Cross and James W. Beekman changed from the Assembly to the Senate.

District	Senator	Party	Notes
1st	William Horace Brown	Democrat	
2nd	John A. Cross*	Whig	
3rd	Richard S. Williams	Whig	
4th	Clarkson Crolius	Whig	
5th	James W. Beekman*	Whig	
6th	Edwin D. Morgan	Whig	
7th	Benjamin Brandreth	Democrat	
8th	John Snyder	Democrat	
9th	James C. Curtis	Democrat	
10th	Marius Schoonmaker	Whig	on November 5, 1850, elected to the 32nd U.S. Congress
11th	Stephen H. Johnson	Whig	
12th	Thomas B. Carroll	Democrat	
13th	James M. Cook*	Whig	on April 9, elected president pro tempore
14th	Thomas Crook	Democrat	
15th	William A. Dart	Democrat	
16th	George H. Fox	Democrat	
17th	Sidney Tuttle	Democrat	
18th	John Noyes	Democrat	
19th	Charles A. Mann	Democrat	
20th	Asahel C. Stone	Democrat	
21st	Alanson Skinner	Democrat	
22nd	George Geddes*	Whig	
23rd	Levi Dimmick	Whig	
24th	William Beach	Whig	
25th	Henry B. Stanton	Democrat	
26th	George B. Guinnip	Democrat	
27th	Samuel Miller	Whig	
28th	Alonzo S. Upham	Whig	
29th	Charles Colt*	Whig	
30th	Charles D. Robinson	Whig	
31st	George R. Babcock	Whig	
32nd	Robert Owen Jr.	Whig	

=== Employees ===
- Clerk: William H. Bogart
- Sergeant-at-Arms: George W. Bull
- Doorkeeper: Ransom Van Valkenburgh
- Assistant Doorkeeper: George A. Loomis

== State Assembly ==
=== Assemblymen ===
The asterisk (*) denotes members of the previous Legislature who continued as members of this Legislature. Frederick S. Martin changed from the Senate to the Assembly.

Party affiliations follow the vote on Speaker.

District		Assemblymen	Party	Notes
Albany	1st	Cornelius Vanderzee	Democrat	
Albany	2nd	Joel B. Nott	Whig	
Albany	3rd	Robert H. Pruyn*	Whig	on January 26, elected Speaker pro tempore
Albany	4th	William S. Shepard	Whig	
Allegany	1st	Anthony T. Wood	Whig	
Allegany	2nd	Joseph Corey	Democrat	
Broome		Edward Y. Park	Whig	
Cattaraugus	1st	Frederick S. Martin*	Whig	on November 5, 1850, elected to the 32nd U.S. Congress
Cattaraugus	2nd	Horace C. Young*	Whig	
Cayuga	1st	Hiram Koon	Democrat	
Cayuga	2nd	John Richardson	Whig	
Cayuga	3rd	Ashbel Avery	Whig	
Chautauqua	1st	John P. Hall	Whig	
Chautauqua	2nd	Samuel Barrett	Whig	
Chemung		Philo Jones	Democrat	
Chenango	1st	Isaac L. F. Cushman	Democrat	
Chenango	2nd	Rufus Chandler	Democrat	
Clinton		Gorton T. Thomas	Democrat	
Columbia	1st	Philip G. Lasher	Whig	
Columbia	2nd	John H. Overhiser	Democrat	
Cortland		Lewis Kingsley	Whig	
Delaware	1st	George H. Winsor	Democrat	
Delaware	2nd	Richard Morse	Whig	
Dutchess	1st	Charles Robinson	Democrat	
Dutchess	2nd	Miner C. Story	Democrat	
Dutchess	3rd	Stephen Haight	Whig	
Erie	1st	Orlando Allen	Whig	
Erie	2nd	Elijah Ford	Democrat	
Erie	3rd	Ira E. Irish	Whig	
Erie	4th	Joseph Candee	Whig	
Essex		George W. Goff*	Whig	
Franklin		William A. Wheeler	Whig	
Fulton and Hamilton		Cyrus H. Brownell	Democrat	
Genesee	1st	John C. Gardner	Whig	
Genesee	2nd	Martin C. Ward*	Whig	
Greene	1st	Alonzo Greene	Democrat	
Greene	2nd	Theodore L. Prevost	Whig	
Herkimer	1st	Asa Vickery	Democrat	
Herkimer	2nd	Humphrey G. Root	Democrat	
Jefferson	1st	John Winslow	Democrat	
Jefferson	2nd	Joel Haworth	Democrat	
Jefferson	3rd	Alfred Fox	Democrat	
Kings	1st	Joseph A. Yard	Democrat	
Kings	2nd	Edwards W. Fiske*	Whig	
Kings	3rd	John H. Baker	Whig	
Lewis		John Newkirk	Democrat	
Livingston	1st	Archibald H. McLean*	Whig	
Livingston	2nd	Philip Woodruff*	Whig	
Madison	1st	John Clark	Whig	
Madison	2nd	Thomas O. Bishop	Democrat	
Monroe	1st	M. Day Hicks	Whig	
Monroe	2nd	L. Ward Smith*	Whig	
Monroe	3rd	Elisha Harmon*	Whig	
Montgomery	1st	Samuel G. Green	Whig	
Montgomery	2nd	Charles Hubbs	Democrat	
New York	1st	John H. White	Whig	
New York	2nd	James Bowen*	Whig	
New York	3rd	Henry J. Allen*	Democrat	
New York	4th	Abram Wakeman	Whig	
New York	5th	Thomas Truslow	Whig	
New York	6th	Jonathan W. Allen	Whig	
New York	7th	Henry J. Raymond	Whig	
New York	8th	Benjamin W. Bradford	Whig	
New York	9th	Jeremiah V. D. B. Fowler	Democrat	
New York	10th	James Monroe	Whig	
New York	11th	Gilbert C. Deane	Democrat	
New York	12th	Abraham B. Davis	Democrat	
New York	13th	Joseph B. Varnum Jr.*	Whig	
New York	14th	George G. Waters	Whig	
New York	15th	John J. Townsend	Whig	
New York	16th	Albert Gilbert*	Whig	
Niagara	1st	George W. Jermain	Whig	
Niagara	2nd	James Van Horn Jr.	Whig	
Oneida	1st	William J. Bacon	Whig	
Oneida	2nd	Ralph McIntosh	Democrat	
Oneida	3rd	Robert Frazier	Democrat	
Oneida	4th	Luther Leland	Democrat	
Onondaga	1st	James Little	Democrat	
Onondaga	2nd	Benjamin J. Cowles	Whig	
Onondaga	3rd	Elias W. Leavenworth	Whig	
Onondaga	4th	Harvey G. Andrews	Democrat	
Ontario	1st	John L. Dox	Whig	
Ontario	2nd	Josiah Porter*	Whig	
Orange	1st	William Graham	Democrat	
Orange	2nd	Albert G. Owen	Democrat	
Orange	3rd	Daniel Fullerton	Whig	contested; seat vacated on February 26
Orange	3rd	Daniel T. Durland	Democrat	seated on February 26
Orleans		Silas M. Burroughs	Democrat	
Oswego	1st	William Lewis Jr.	Democrat	
Oswego	2nd	Luke D. Smith	Democrat	
Otsego	1st	Anson C. Parshall	Democrat	
Otsego	2nd	Joseph Peck	Democrat	
Otsego	3rd	Edward Pratt	Democrat	
Putnam		William Bowne	Democrat	
Queens		John S. Snedeker	Democrat	
Rensselaer	1st	George Lesley	Whig	
Rensselaer	2nd	Edward P. Pickett	Democrat	
Rensselaer	3rd	Lansing Sheldon	Democrat	
Richmond		Benjamin P. Prall	Democrat	
Rockland		Brewster J. Allison	Democrat	
St. Lawrence	1st	Harlow Godard*	Democrat	
St. Lawrence	2nd	John Horton	Democrat	
St. Lawrence	3rd	Noble S. Elderkin*	Democrat	on January 1, elected Speaker; left Assembly on January 26, to be with his dying wife
Saratoga	1st	James Noxon	Democrat	
Saratoga	2nd	Frederick J. Wing	Whig	
Schenectady		James Allen	Whig	
Schoharie	1st	Daniel D. Dodge	Democrat	
Schoharie	2nd	John Avery	Democrat	
Seneca		Alfred Bolter	Democrat	
Steuben	1st	Edwin F. Church	Democrat	
Steuben	2nd	Ferral C. Dininny	Democrat	on March 13, elected Speaker pro tempore
Steuben	3rd	James Alley	Whig	
Suffolk	1st	David Pierson	Democrat	
Suffolk	2nd	Walter Scudder	Democrat	
Sullivan		James F. Bush*	Whig	
Tioga		Isaac Lott	Whig	
Tompkins	1st	Henry Brewer	Democrat	
Tompkins	2nd	Elias W. Cady	Whig	
Ulster	1st	Milton Sheldon	Democrat	
Ulster	2nd	John P. Davis	Democrat	
Warren		Cyrus Burnham	Democrat	
Washington	1st	David Sill	Whig	
Washington	2nd	Calvin Pease	Whig	
Wayne	1st	James M. Wilson	Democrat	
Wayne	2nd	Elihu Durfee	Whig	
Westchester	1st	William H. Robertson*	Whig	
Westchester	2nd	Jesse Lyon	Democrat	
Wyoming		James Sprague	Whig	
Yates		Melatiah H. Lawrence	Democrat	

=== Employees ===
- Clerk: James R. Rose
- Sergeant-at-Arms: Samuel Reynolds
- Doorkeeper: John K. Anderson
- First Assistant Doorkeeper: Matthew Higgins
- Second Assistant Doorkeeper: Thomas Hollenbeck

== Sources ==
- The New York Civil List compiled by Franklin Benjamin Hough (Weed, Parsons and Co., 1858) [pg. 109 for Senate districts; pg. 136 for senators; pg. 148–157 for Assembly districts; pg. 238ff for assemblymen]
- Journal of the Senate (73rd Session) (1850)
