= 74th New York State Legislature =

New York state legislative session

←	73rd	75th	→
- The Old State Capitol (1879)

Overview
- Legislative body: New York State Legislature
- Jurisdiction: New York, United States
- Term: January 1 – December 31, 1851

Senate
- Members: 32
- President: Lt. Gov. Sanford E. Church (D)
- Temporary President: James M. Cook (W), from February 10; Edwin D. Morgan (W), from March 29
- Party control: Whig (17-15)

Assembly
- Members: 128
- Speaker: Henry J. Raymond (W); Joseph B. Varnum Jr. (W) Acting, from June 10
- Party control: Whig (83-45)

Sessions
- 1st: January 7 – April 17, 1851
- 1st: June 10 – July 11, 1851

The 74th New York State Legislature, consisting of the New York State Senate and the New York State Assembly, met from January 7 to July 11, 1851, during the first year of Washington Hunt's governorship, in Albany.

== Background ==
Under the provisions of the New York Constitution of 1846, 32 Senators were elected in single-seat senatorial districts for a two-year term, the whole Senate being renewed biennially. The senatorial districts (except those in New York City) were made up of entire counties. 128 Assemblymen were elected in single-seat districts to a one-year term, the whole Assembly being renewed annually. The Assembly districts were made up of entire towns, or city wards, forming a contiguous area, all in the same county. The City and County of New York was divided into four senatorial districts, and 16 Assembly districts.

At this time there were two major political parties: the Democratic Party and the Whig Party. The Whigs were split into two opposing factions: the Seward/Weed faction (the majority, opposed to the Compromise of 1850) and the "Silver Grays" (supporters of President Millard Fillmore and his compromise legislation, led by Francis Granger whose silver gray hair originated the faction's nickname). The Anti-Rent Party mostly endorsed Whig or Democratic nominees. The radical abolitionists appeared as the Liberty Party.

== Elections ==
The 1850 New York state election was held on November 5.

Washington Hunt (Whig) was elected governor; and Sanford E. Church (Dem.) was elected lieutenant governor. The other three statewide elective offices up for election were carried by the Democrats.

82 Whigs, 44 Democrats and 2 Independents were elected to the State Assembly.

== Sessions ==
The Legislature met for the regular session at the Old State Capitol in Albany on January 7, 1851; and adjourned on April 17.

Henry J. Raymond (Whig) was elected Speaker with 80 votes against 42 for Noble S. Elderkin (Dem.). Richard U. Sherman (W) was elected Clerk of the Assembly with 81 votes against 44 for the incumbent James R. Rose (D).

On February 4, the Legislature failed to elect a U.S. Senator to succeed Daniel S. Dickinson (Dem.), and the seat became vacant on March 4, 1851.

On February 25, Joseph B. Varnum Jr. was elected Speaker pro tempore, to preside over the Assembly during the absence of Speaker Raymond.

On March 3, Senator William A. Dart questioned the right of Marius Schoonmaker to keep his seat in the Senate. Schoonmaker had been elected to Congress at the last State election, but Congress would not actually meet until December. After some debate, the Senate decided on March 5 that Schoonmaker "is a member of the present Senate... and will remain so, until he accepts the office of member of Congress, or until he otherwise vacates his seat in the Senate."

On March 19, the Legislature elected Hamilton Fish (W) to the vacant seat in the U.S. Senate.

On April 17, twelve Democratic state senators resigned, leaving the Senate without the necessary quorum of two-thirds to pass "An Act to provide for the completion of the Erie canal enlargement, and the Black River and Genesee Valley canals".

On May 27, a special election was held to fill the vacancies in the State Senate. Six of the resigned senators were re-elected; five vacancies were filled with men who later voted for the passage of the bill; and one election resulted in a tie.

The Legislature met for a special session on June 10, 1851; and adjourned on July 11.

Due to ill health, Speaker Raymond did not attend the special session, and Joseph B. Varnum Jr. was again elected Speaker pro tempore, to preside over the Assembly during the special session.

On June 24, the Canal Enlargement Bill was passed in the Senate by a vote of 22 to 8.

On July 2, the Whig majority admitted their party fellow Wiliam J. Gilbert to the vacant seat.

== State Senate ==
=== Districts ===
- 1st District: Queens, Richmond and Suffolk counties
- 2nd District: Kings County
- 3rd District: 1st, 2nd, 3rd, 4th, 5th and 6th wards of New York City
- 4th District: 7th, 10th, 13th and 17th wards of New York City
- 5th District: 8th, 9th and 14th wards of New York City
- 6th District: 11th, 12th, 15th, 16th, 18th, 19th, 20th, 21st and 22nd wards of New York City
- 7th District: Putnam, Rockland and Westchester counties
- 8th District: Columbia and Dutchess counties
- 9th District: Orange and Sullivan counties
- 10th District: Greene and Ulster counties
- 11th District: Albany and Schenectady counties
- 12th District: Rensselaer County
- 13th District: Saratoga and Washington counties
- 14th District: Clinton, Essex and Warren counties
- 15th District: Franklin and St. Lawrence counties
- 16th District: Fulton, Hamilton, Herkimer and Montgomery counties
- 17th District: Delaware and Schoharie counties
- 18th District: Chenango and Otsego counties
- 19th District: Oneida County
- 20th District: Madison and Oswego counties
- 21st District: Jefferson and Lewis counties
- 22nd District: Onondaga County
- 23rd District: Broome, Cortland and Tioga counties
- 24th District: Cayuga and Wayne counties
- 25th District: Seneca, Tompkins and Yates counties
- 26th District: Chemung and Steuben counties
- 27th District: Monroe County
- 28th District: Genesee, Niagara and Orleans counties
- 29th District: Livingston and Ontario counties
- 30th District: Allegany and Wyoming counties
- 31st District: Erie County
- 32nd District: Cattaraugus and Chautauqua counties
Note: There are now 62 counties in the State of New York. The counties which are not mentioned in this list had not yet been established, or sufficiently organized, the area being included in one or more of the abovementioned counties.

=== Members ===
The asterisk (*) denotes members of the previous Legislature who continued in office as members of this Legislature. Caleb Lyon and Moses P. Hatch changed from the Assembly to the Senate between the regular and the special session.

District	Senator	Party	Notes
1st	William Horace Brown*	Democrat	resigned on April 17; re-elected on May 27; died on July 4, 1851
2nd	John A. Cross*	Whig	
3rd	Richard S. Williams*	Whig	
4th	Clarkson Crolius*	Whig	
5th	James W. Beekman*	Whig	
6th	Edwin D. Morgan*	Whig	on March 29, elected president pro tempore
7th	Benjamin Brandreth*	Democrat	
8th	John Snyder*	Democrat	resigned on April 17
8th	Joseph Halstead	Whig	on May 27, elected to fill vacancy, in place of Snyder
9th	James C. Curtis*	Democrat	resigned on April 17; re-elected on May 27
10th	Marius Schoonmaker*	Whig	on November 5, 1850, elected to the 32nd U.S. Congress; resigned his seat in the State Senate on July 26, 1851
11th	Stephen H. Johnson*	Whig	
12th	Thomas B. Carroll*	Democrat	
13th	James M. Cook*	Whig	on February 10, elected president pro tempore
14th	Thomas Crook*	Democrat	
15th	William A. Dart*	Democrat	resigned on April 17; re-elected on May 27
16th	George H. Fox*	Democrat	resigned on April 17
16th	John Sanford	Democrat	on May 27, elected to fill vacancy, in place of Fox
17th	Sidney Tuttle*	Democrat	resigned on April 17; re-elected on May 27
18th	John Noyes*	Democrat	resigned on April 17; re-elected on May 27
19th	Charles A. Mann*	Democrat	resigned on April 17
19th	Benjamin N. Huntington	Whig	on May 27, elected to fill vacancy, in place of Mann
20th	Asahel C. Stone*	Democrat	resigned on April 17
20th	Moses P. Hatch	Democrat	on April 17, resigned his seat in the Assembly; on May 27, elected to fill vacancy, in place of Stone
21st	Alanson Skinner*	Democrat	resigned on April 17
21st	Caleb Lyon	Ind.	on April 26, resigned his seat in the Assembly; on May 27, elected to fill vacancy, in place of Skinner
22nd	George Geddes*	Whig	
23rd	Levi Dimmick*	Whig	resigned on November 12, 1851
24th	William Beach*	Whig	
25th	Henry B. Stanton*	Democrat	resigned on April 17; re-elected on May 27
26th	George B. Guinnip*	Democrat	resigned on April 17
26th	William J. Gilbert	Whig	on July 2, seated by resolution of the State Senate to fill vacancy, in place of Guinnip
27th	Samuel Miller*	Whig	
28th	Alonzo S. Upham*	Whig	
29th	Charles Colt*	Whig	
30th	Charles D. Robinson*	Whig	
31st	George R. Babcock*	Whig	
32nd	Robert Owen Jr.*	Whig	

=== Employees ===
- Clerk: William H. Bogart
- Sergeant-at-Arms: George W. Bull
- Doorkeeper: Ransom Van Valkenburgh
- Assistant Doorkeeper: George A. Loomis

== State Assembly ==
=== Assemblymen ===
The asterisk (*) denotes members of the previous Legislature who continued as members of this Legislature.

Party affiliations follow the vote on Speaker.

District		Assemblymen	Party	Notes
Albany	1st	Robert Babcock	Democrat	
Albany	2nd	Adam I. Shultes	Whig	
Albany	3rd	Hamilton Harris	Whig	
Albany	4th	Eli Perry	Democrat	
Allegany	1st	Emery E. Norton	Whig	
Allegany	2nd	Anson Congdon	Democrat	
Broome		Roger W. Hinds	Whig	
Cattaraugus	1st	Alonzo A. Gregory	Whig	
Cattaraugus	2nd	William J. Nelson	Whig	
Cayuga	1st	Levi Colvin	Democrat	
Cayuga	2nd	George Underwood	Whig	
Cayuga	3rd	Delos Bradley	Whig	
Chautauqua	1st	Austin Smith	Whig	
Chautauqua	2nd	Daniel W. Douglass	Whig	
Chemung		Samuel Minier	Democrat	
Chenango	1st	Levi Harris	Whig	
Chenango	2nd	Laman Ingersoll	Whig	
Clinton		Henry G. Hewit	Whig	
Columbia	1st	John D. Langdon	Whig	
Columbia	2nd	Philetus W. Bishop	Whig	
Cortland		Alvan Kellogg	Whig	
Delaware	1st	Samuel Doyle	Democrat	
Delaware	2nd	William Gleason Jr.	Whig	
Dutchess	1st	Charles Robinson*	Democrat	
Dutchess	2nd	Howland R. Sherman	Whig	
Dutchess	3rd	William H. Feller	Whig	
Erie	1st	Orlando Allen*	Whig	
Erie	2nd	William A. Bird	Whig	
Erie	3rd	Henry Atwood	Whig	
Erie	4th	Charles C. Severance	Whig	
Essex		Abraham Welden	Whig	
Franklin		William A. Wheeler*	Whig	
Fulton and Hamilton		John Stewart	Democrat	
Genesee	1st	Albert Rowe	Whig	
Genesee	2nd	Levi Fisk	Whig	
Greene	1st	J. Atwater Cooke	Whig	
Greene	2nd	Henry Kinsley	Democrat	
Herkimer	1st	John H. Wooster	Democrat	
Herkimer	2nd	Daniel Shall	Democrat	
Jefferson	1st	William A. Gilbert	Whig	
Jefferson	2nd	John Pool Jr.	Democrat	
Jefferson	3rd	Lorin Bushnell	Democrat	
Kings	1st	George E. Baker	Whig	
Kings	2nd	Howard C. Cady	Whig	
Kings	3rd	Edward T. Backhouse	Whig	
Lewis		Caleb Lyon	Ind.	ran as an Independent, but voted for Raymond as Speaker; resigned on April 26; elected to the State Senate on May 27
Lewis		Dean S. Howard		on May 27, elected to fill vacancy, in place of Lyon
Livingston	1st	Alvin Chamberlin	Whig	
Livingston	2nd	Orrin D. Lake	Whig	
Madison	1st	Jairus French	Democrat	
Madison	2nd	Franklin B. Hoppin	Whig	
Monroe	1st	Nathaniel H. Fordyce	Whig	
Monroe	2nd	William A. Fitzhugh	Whig	
Monroe	3rd	Caleb B. Corser	Whig	
Montgomery	1st	Solomon P. Heath	Whig	
Montgomery	2nd	Conrad P. Snell	Democrat	
New York	1st	Albert A. Thompson	Democrat	
New York	2nd	Charles R. Swords	Whig	
New York	3rd	Henry J. Allen*	Democrat	
New York	4th	Abram Wakeman*	Whig	
New York	5th	Michael Dougherty	Democrat	
New York	6th	Wyllis Blackstone	Whig	
New York	7th	Henry J. Raymond*	Whig	elected Speaker
New York	8th	Sanford L. Macomber	Whig	
New York	9th	John Ryan	Whig	
New York	10th	Lebbeus B. Ward	Whig	
New York	11th	James Dewey	Whig	
New York	12th	William S. Gregory	Whig	
New York	13th	Joseph B. Varnum Jr.*	Whig	on February 25, elected Speaker pro tempore; on June 10, re-elected Speaker pro tempore
New York	14th	George Clark	Whig	
New York	15th	John J. Townsend*	Whig	
New York	16th	William D. Greene	Whig	
Niagara	1st	Abijah H. Moss	Whig	
Niagara	2nd	Jeptha W. Babcock	Whig	
Oneida	1st	Joseph Benedict	Whig	
Oneida	2nd	Lorenzo Rouse	Whig	
Oneida	3rd	Lewis Rider	Democrat	
Oneida	4th	George Brayton	Whig	
Onondaga	1st	Demosthenes C. Le Roy	Democrat	
Onondaga	2nd	John F. Clark	Democrat	
Onondaga	3rd	George Stevens	Whig	
Onondaga	4th	Daniel Denison	Democrat	
Ontario	1st	Thomas J. McLouth	Whig	
Ontario	2nd	Henry Pardee	Whig	
Orange	1st	Oliver Belknap	Whig	
Orange	2nd	Phineas Rumsey	Whig	
Orange	3rd	Milton Barnes	Democrat	
Orleans		Silas M. Burroughs*	Democrat	
Oswego	1st	Moses P. Hatch	Democrat	resigned on April 17; elected to the State Senate on May 27
Oswego	1st	William P. Curtis		on May 27, elected to fill vacancy, in place of Hatch
Oswego	2nd	Benjamin F. Lewis	Democrat	
Otsego	1st	Henry J. Campbell	Whig	
Otsego	2nd	Edwin S. Coffin	Ind.	ran as a "Free Soil Independent", but voted for Elderkin as Speaker
Otsego	3rd	Worthington Wright	Democrat	
Putnam		William Bowne*	Democrat	
Queens		James Maurice	Democrat	
Rensselaer	1st	George Lesley*	Whig	
Rensselaer	2nd	William Russell	Democrat	
Rensselaer	3rd	Oliver C. Thompson	Democrat	
Richmond		William H. Anthon	Whig	
Rockland		Jacob Sickles	Democrat	
St. Lawrence	1st	Smith Stilwell	Democrat	
St. Lawrence	2nd	John Horton*	Democrat	
St. Lawrence	3rd	Noble S. Elderkin*	Democrat	
Saratoga	1st	Abraham Leggett	Whig	
Saratoga	2nd	John L. Perry	Whig	
Schenectady		Reuben Ellwood	Whig	
Schoharie	1st	Lewis Rockwell	Democrat	
Schoharie	2nd	Abraham L. Lawyer	Democrat	
Seneca		Orin Southwick	Whig	
Steuben	1st	Charles G. Higby	Democrat	
Steuben	2nd	James H. Miles	Whig	
Steuben	3rd	Joel Carrington	Whig	
Suffolk	1st	Franklin Tuthill	Whig	
Suffolk	2nd	Egbert T. Smith	Democrat	
Sullivan		Jonathan Stratton	Democrat	
Tioga		James Ely	Whig	
Tompkins	1st	Alexander Graham	Whig	
Tompkins	2nd	Benjamin G. Ferris	Whig	
Ulster	1st	William F. Russell	Democrat	
Ulster	2nd	John P. Davis*	Democrat	
Warren		David Noble 2d	Democrat	
Washington	1st	Thomas C. Whiteside	Whig	
Washington	2nd	James Farr	Whig	
Wayne	1st	Edward W. Bottum	Whig	
Wayne	2nd	Theron G. Yeomans	Whig	
Westchester	1st	Daniel Clark Briggs	Whig	
Westchester	2nd	Theodore H. Benedict	Whig	
Wyoming		Wolcott J. Humphrey	Whig	
Yates		Samuel Jayne Jr.	Democrat	unsuccessfully contested by John Underwood

=== Employees ===
- Clerk: Richard U. Sherman
- Sergeant-at-Arms: Willett B. Goddard
- Doorkeeper: Samuel R. Tuell
- First Assistant Doorkeeper: John Parks
- Second Assistant Doorkeeper: Thomas E. Osborn

== Sources ==
- The New York Civil List compiled by Franklin Benjamin Hough (Weed, Parsons and Co., 1858) [pg. 109 for Senate districts; pg. 136 for senators; pg. 148–157 for Assembly districts; pg. 240ff for assemblymen]
- Journal of the Senate (74th Session) (1851)
- Journal of the Assembly (74th Session) (1851, Vol. I)
