= 72nd New York State Legislature =

New York state legislative session

←	71st	73rd	→
- The Old State Capitol (1879)

Overview
- Legislative body: New York State Legislature
- Jurisdiction: New York, United States
- Term: January 1 – December 31, 1849

Senate
- Members: 32
- President: Lt. Gov. George W. Patterson (W)
- Temporary President: Samuel J. Wilkin (W), from April 11
- Party control: Whig (24-6-2)

Assembly
- Members: 128
- Speaker: Amos K. Hadley (W)
- Party control: Whig (106-15-7)

Sessions
- 1st: January 2 – April 11, 1849

The 72nd New York State Legislature, consisting of the New York State Senate and the New York State Assembly, met from January 2 to April 11, 1849, during the first year of Hamilton Fish's governorship, in Albany.

== Background ==
Under the provisions of the New York Constitution of 1846, 32 Senators were elected in single-seat senatorial districts for a two-year term, the whole Senate being renewed biennially. The senatorial districts (except those in New York City) were made up of entire counties. 128 Assemblymen were elected in single-seat districts to a one-year term, the whole Assembly being renewed annually. The Assembly districts were made up of entire towns, or city wards, forming a contiguous area, all in the same county. The City and County of New York was divided into four senatorial districts, and 16 Assembly districts.

State Senator Allen Ayrault resigned on June 2, 1848, leaving a vacancy in the 29th District.

At this time there were two major political parties: the Democratic Party and the Whig Party. The Democratic Party was split into two factions: the "Barnburners" and the "Hunkers." The Barnburners walked out of the 1848 Democratic state convention and joined up with a small faction of anti-slavery Whigs and most of the Liberty Party to form the Free Soil Party. The uncompromising radical abolitionists ran their own tickets as the Liberty Party.

== Elections ==
The 1848 New York state election was held on November 7.

Whigs Hamilton Fish and George W. Patterson were elected Governor and Lieutenant Governor; and the other two statewide elective offices were also carried by the Whigs.

State Comptroller Millard Fillmore was elected United States Vice President.

106 Whigs, 15 Free Soilers and 7 Hunkers were elected to the State Assembly. One Whig was elected to fill the vacancy in the State Senate.

== Sessions ==
The Legislature met for the regular session at the Old State Capitol in Albany on January 2, 1849; and adjourned on April 11.

Amos K. Hadley (W) was re-elected Speaker with 101 votes against 13 for Frederick P. Bellinger (Barnb.) and 6 for Charles C. Noble (Hunker).

On January 31, State Comptroller Millard Fillmore sent a letter to the Legislature, resigning the office, to take effect on February 20.

On February 6, the Legislature elected William H. Seward (W) to succeed John A. Dix (Barnb.) as U.S. Senator, for a six-year term beginning on March 4, 1849.

On February 17, the Legislature elected Washington Hunt (W) to succeed Millard Fillmore as State Comptroller on February 20.

On April 11, Samuel J. Wilkin was elected president pro tempore of the State Senate.

== State Senate ==
=== Districts ===
- 1st District: Queens, Richmond and Suffolk counties
- 2nd District: Kings County
- 3rd District: 1st, 2nd, 3rd, 4th, 5th and 6th wards of New York City
- 4th District: 7th, 10th, 13th and 17th wards of New York City
- 5th District: 8th, 9th and 14th wards of New York City
- 6th District: 11th, 12th, 15th, 16th, 18th, 19th, 20th, 21st and 22nd wards of New York City
- 7th District: Putnam, Rockland and Westchester counties
- 8th District: Columbia and Dutchess counties
- 9th District: Orange and Sullivan counties
- 10th District: Greene and Ulster counties
- 11th District: Albany and Schenectady counties
- 12th District: Rensselaer County
- 13th District: Saratoga and Washington counties
- 14th District: Clinton, Essex and Warren counties
- 15th District: Franklin and St. Lawrence counties
- 16th District: Fulton, Hamilton, Herkimer and Montgomery counties
- 17th District: Delaware and Schoharie counties
- 18th District: Chenango and Otsego counties
- 19th District: Oneida County
- 20th District: Madison and Oswego counties
- 21st District: Jefferson and Lewis counties
- 22nd District: Onondaga County
- 23rd District: Broome, Cortland and Tioga counties
- 24th District: Cayuga and Wayne counties
- 25th District: Seneca, Tompkins and Yates counties
- 26th District: Chemung and Steuben counties
- 27th District: Monroe County
- 28th District: Genesee, Niagara and Orleans counties
- 29th District: Livingston and Ontario counties
- 30th District: Allegany and Wyoming counties
- 31st District: Erie County
- 32nd District: Cattaraugus and Chautauqua counties
Note: There are now 62 counties in the State of New York. The counties which are not mentioned in this list had not yet been established, or sufficiently organized, the area being included in one or more of the abovementioned counties.

=== Members ===
The asterisk (*) denotes members of the previous Legislature who continued in office as members of this Legislature.

District	Senator	Party	Notes
1st	John G. Floyd*	Democrat/Barnburner	
2nd	David A. Bokee*	Whig	on November 7, 1848, elected to the 31st U.S. Congress
3rd	William Hall*	Whig	
4th	John L. Lawrence*	Whig	
5th	Samuel Frost*	Whig	
6th	William Samuel Johnson*	Whig	
7th	Saxton Smith*	Democrat/Barnburner	
8th	Alexander J. Coffin*	Whig	
9th	Samuel J. Wilkin*	Whig	on April 11, 1849, elected president pro tempore
10th	Platt Adams*	Democrat/Hunker	
11th	Valentine Treadwell*	Whig	
12th	Albert R. Fox*	Whig	
13th	James M. Cook*	Whig	
14th	James S. Whallon*	Democrat/Barnburner	
15th	John Fine*	Democrat/Barnburner	
16th	Thomas Burch*	Whig	
17th	John M. Betts*	Democrat/Barnburner	
18th	David H. Little*	Whig	
19th	Thomas E. Clark*	Whig	
20th	Thomas H. Bond*	Whig	
21st	John W. Tamblin*	Democrat/Hunker	
22nd	George Geddes*	Whig	
23rd	Samuel H. P. Hall*	Whig	
24th	William J. Cornwell*	Whig	
25th	Timothy S. Williams*	Whig	died on March 11, 1849
26th	William M. Hawley*	Democrat/Barnburner	
27th	Jerome Fuller*	Whig	
28th	A. Hyde Cole*	Whig	
29th	Charles Colt	Whig	elected to fill vacancy, in place of Allen Ayrault
30th	John W. Brownson*	Whig	
31st	John T. Bush*	Whig	
32nd	Frederick S. Martin*	Whig	

=== Employees ===
- Clerk: Andrew H. Calhoun

== State Assembly ==
=== Assemblymen ===
The asterisk (*) denotes members of the previous Legislature who continued as members of this Legislature.

Party affiliations follow the vote on Speaker, U.S. Senator and USNY Regent.

District		Assemblymen	Party	Notes
Albany	1st	Hiram Barber	Democrat/Hunker	
Albany	2nd	David Van Auken	Whig	
Albany	3rd	Robert H. Pruyn*	Whig	
Albany	4th	Joel A. Wing	Whig	
Allegany	1st	Orville Boardman	Whig	
Allegany	2nd	Erastus H. Willard	Whig	
Broome		John O. Whittaker	Whig	
Cattaraugus	1st	Seth R. Crittenden	Whig	
Cattaraugus	2nd	Horace C. Young	Whig	
Cayuga	1st	James D. Button	Free Soil	
Cayuga	2nd	John I. Brinckerhoff*	Whig	
Cayuga	3rd	Hector C. Tuthill*	Whig	
Chautauqua	1st	Silas Terry	Whig	
Chautauqua	2nd	Ezekiel B. Gurnsey	Whig	
Chemung		Alvan Nash	Free Soil	
Chenango	1st	James Clark	Whig	
Chenango	2nd	Alonzo Johnson	Whig	
Clinton		Albert G. Carver	Whig	
Columbia	1st	James M. Strever	Whig	
Columbia	2nd	Daniel S. Curtis	Whig	
Cortland		Ira Skeel	Whig	
Delaware	1st	James E. Thompson	Free Soil	
Delaware	2nd	Luther Butts	Democrat/Hunker	
Dutchess	1st	Edgar Vincent*	Whig	
Dutchess	2nd	Wesley Butts	Whig	
Dutchess	3rd	James Hammond*	Whig	
Erie	1st	Benoni Thompson	Whig	
Erie	2nd	Augustus Raynor	Whig	
Erie	3rd	Marcus McNeal	Whig	
Erie	4th	Luther Buxton	Whig	
Essex		George W. Goff	Whig	
Franklin		George B. R. Gove	Whig	
Fulton and Hamilton		John Culbert	Whig	
Genesee	1st	Tracy Pardee*	Whig	
Genesee	2nd	Martin C. Ward	Whig	
Greene	1st	Alexander H. Bailey	Whig	
Greene	2nd	Albert Tuttle	Whig	
Herkimer	1st	Frederick P. Bellinger	Free Soil	
Herkimer	2nd	Asa Wilcox	Free Soil	
Jefferson	1st	George Gates	Whig	
Jefferson	2nd	John L. Marsh	Free Soil	
Jefferson	3rd	Bernard Bagley	Whig	
Kings	1st	Joseph Boughton	Whig	
Kings	2nd	Edwards W. Fiske*	Whig	
Kings	3rd	John A. Cross*	Whig	
Lewis		Diodate Pease	Whig	
Livingston	1st	Archibald H. McLean	Whig	
Livingston	2nd	Philip Woodruff	Whig	
Madison	1st	David Maine	Whig	
Madison	2nd	Robert G. Stewart	Whig	
Monroe	1st	Levi Kelsey	Whig	
Monroe	2nd	L. Ward Smith	Whig	
Monroe	3rd	Elisha Harmon	Whig	
Montgomery	1st	Frothingham Fish	Whig	
Montgomery	2nd	Lewis Averill	Whig	
New York	1st	Ephraim H. Hudson	Whig	
New York	2nd	James Bowen*	Whig	
New York	3rd	Henry J. Allen	Democrat/Hunker	
New York	4th	George J. Cornell	Whig	
New York	5th	Samuel T. McKinney	Whig	
New York	6th	James W. Beekman	Whig	
New York	7th	Abraham Van Orden	Whig	
New York	8th	William Dodge	Whig	
New York	9th	Charles Perley	Whig	
New York	10th	Garret H. Striker	Whig	
New York	11th	Robert B. Folger	Whig	
New York	12th	Daniel B. Taylor	Democrat/Hunker	
New York	13th	Joseph B. Varnum Jr.	Whig	
New York	14th	Robert G. Campbell*	Whig	
New York	15th	Merwin R. Brewer*	Whig	
New York	16th	Albert Gilbert	Whig	
Niagara	1st	Hollis White	Whig	
Niagara	2nd	Morgan Johnson*	Whig	
Oneida	1st	Oliver Prescott	Whig	
Oneida	2nd	Nehemiah N. Pierce	Whig	
Oneida	3rd	James M. Elwood	Free Soil	
Oneida	4th	Chauncey Stevens	Free Soil	
Onondaga	1st	Joseph J. Glass	Whig	
Onondaga	2nd	Myron Wheaton	Free Soil	
Onondaga	3rd	Joseph Slocum	Whig	
Onondaga	4th	Samuel Hart	Whig	
Ontario	1st	Dolphin Stephenson	Whig	
Ontario	2nd	Josiah Porter	Whig	
Orange	1st	David C. Bull	Whig	
Orange	2nd	David H. Moffatt Jr.	Whig	
Orange	3rd	Maurice Hoyt	Whig	
Orleans		Reuben Roblee	Whig	
Oswego	1st	Henry Fitzhugh	Whig	
Oswego	2nd	Edward W. Fox	Free Soil	
Otsego	1st	L. Mortimer Gilbert	Whig	
Otsego	2nd	David B. St. John	Democrat/Hunker	
Otsego	3rd	Charles C. Noble	Democrat/Hunker	
Putnam		James J. Smalley	Democrat/Hunker	
Queens		Wessell S. Smith*	Whig	
Rensselaer	1st	Amos K. Hadley*	Whig	re-elected Speaker
Rensselaer	2nd	Benajah Allen	Whig	
Rensselaer	3rd	William H. Budd	Whig	
Richmond		Gabriel P. Disosway	Whig	
Rockland		Matthew D. Bogart	Free Soil	
St. Lawrence	1st	Harlow Godard	Free Soil	
St. Lawrence	2nd	Justus B. Picket	Free Soil	
St. Lawrence	3rd	Noble S. Elderkin	Free Soil	
Saratoga	1st	Roscius R. Kennedy	Whig	
Saratoga	2nd	William W. Rockwell	Whig	
Schenectady		Israel R. Green	Whig	
Schoharie	1st	David B. Danforth	Whig	
Schoharie	2nd	Austin Sexton	Whig	
Seneca		Jacob G. Markell	Whig	
Steuben	1st	Abraham J. Quackenboss	Free Soil	
Steuben	2nd	John G. Mersereau*	Whig	
Steuben	3rd	John K. Hale	Whig	
Suffolk	1st	Edwin Rose*	Whig	
Suffolk	2nd	Nathaniel Miller	Whig	
Sullivan		James F. Bush*	Whig	
Tioga		Ezra S. Sweet	Whig	
Tompkins	1st	Darius Hall	Whig	
Tompkins	2nd	Charles J. Rounseville	Whig	
Ulster	1st	Peter Crispell Jr.	Whig	
Ulster	2nd	James G. Graham	Whig	
Warren		Reuben Wells	Whig	
Washington	1st	LeRoy Mowry	Whig	
Washington	2nd	Alexander Robertson	Whig	
Wayne	1st	Isaac Leavenworth	Whig	
Wayne	2nd	Peter Boyce	Whig	
Westchester	1st	William H. Robertson	Whig	
Westchester	2nd	Harvey Kidd	Whig	
Wyoming		Paul Richards*	Whig	
Yates		John Wisewell	Whig	

=== Employees ===
- Clerk: Philander B. Prindle
- Sergeant-at-Arms: Samuel S. Blanchard
- Doorkeeper: Robert Grant
- Assistant Doorkeeper: Thomas E. Osborn
- Second Assistant Doorkeeper: Samuel Merclean

== Sources ==
- The New York Civil List compiled by Franklin Benjamin Hough (Weed, Parsons and Co., 1858) [pg. 109 for Senate districts; pg. 136 for senators; pg. 148–157 for Assembly districts; pg. 234ff for assemblymen]
- Journal of the Senate (72nd Session) (1849)
