= Robert H. Pruyn =

American politician

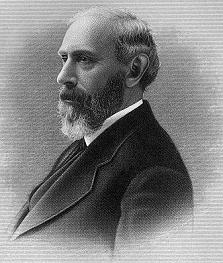
- Robert H. Pruyn, circa 1865

United States Minister Resident to Japan
- In office May 17, 1862 – April 28, 1865
- Preceded by: Townsend Harris
- Succeeded by: Robert B. Van Valkenburgh

Speaker of the New York State Assembly
- In office January 30, 1850-March 14, 1850
- Preceded by: Noble S. Elderkin
- Succeeded by: Ferral C. Dininny
- In office January 3, 1854-December 31, 1854
- Preceded by: William H. Ludlow
- Succeeded by: DeWitt C. Littlejohn

Member of the New York State Assembly from Albany County's 3rd District
- In office January 3, 1854-December 31, 1854
- Preceded by: William W. Forsyth
- Succeeded by: Alexander Davidson
- In office January 4, 1848-December 31, 1852
- Preceded by: Valentine Treadwell
- Succeeded by: William W. Forsyth

Adjutant General of New York
- In office March 5, 1855 – January 1, 1857
- Preceded by: John Watts de Peyster
- Succeeded by: Frederick Townsend

Personal details
- Born: February 14, 1815 Albany, New York, US
- Died: February 26, 1882 (aged 67) Albany, New York, US
- Resting place: Albany Rural Cemetery, Menands, New York
- Spouse: Jane Ann Lansing (m. 1841)
- Relations: Gerrit Y. Lansing (father in law)
- Children: 4 (including Robert)
- Education: Rutgers University (B.S., M.A.)
- Occupation: Politician, lawyer, diplomat

Robert Hewson Pruyn (February 14, 1815 – February 26, 1882) was an American lawyer, militia general, diplomat, and politician from Albany, New York. He was most notable for his service as Speaker of the New York State Assembly, Adjutant General of New York, and United States Minister Resident to Japan.

== Early life ==
Pruyn was born in Albany, New York, on February 14, 1815, the son of Casparus F. and Ann (née Hewson) Pruyn. The Pruyn (pronounced "Prine") family of Albany, New York was one of the oldest and most esteemed Dutch families in New York, and at the time of Robert's birth there, had resided in Albany for over two centuries.

Pruyn graduated from The Albany Academy, and received Bachelor of Arts (1833) and Master of Arts (1836) degrees from Rutgers University. He studied law with Abraham Van Vechten, was admitted to the bar, and practiced in Albany.

== Political, military, and diplomatic service ==
Pruyn served as Albany's corporation counsel and was a member of the city council. Active in the state militia, he was named Judge Advocate General in 1841, serving until 1846, and again in 1851.

A political ally and close friend to William Henry Seward, he was a Whig member of the New York State Assembly (Albany Co., 3rd D.) in 1848, 1849, 1850, 1851, 1852 and 1854. On January 30, 1850, after Speaker Noble S. Elderkin left the Assembly to stay at home with his wife who was terminally ill, Pruyn was elected Speaker pro tempore. He was again Speaker in 1854.

Pruyn was an experienced militia officer, including service as the state judge advocate general. In 1855, Governor Myron Clark appointed him Adjutant General of the New York National Guard, replacing John Watts de Peyster. He achieved the rank of brigadier general of the militia, and was succeeded as adjutant general by Frederick Townsend.

At the personal request of Seward, who was then Secretary of State, President Abraham Lincoln appointed him Minister to Japan in 1861, and he served in that capacity until 1865, when he returned to New York. Japan–United States relations had only recently been established with the visits by Commodore Perry in 1852 to 1854.

Pruyn's crowning achievement was the successful negotiation following the Shimonoseki bombardment. He was considered highly successful in his dealings with the shōgun. He also signed an agreement to allow shipwrecked Japanese sailors to be repatriated.

=== Later career ===
He was awarded an LL.D. from Williams College in 1865 and served on the board of trustees. He went on to become president of the National Commercial Bank and Trust of Albany, and was one of the founders of Albany Law School.

In 1866, he was the unsuccessful Conservative Union candidate for Lieutenant Governor of New York along with gubernatorial candidate, John T. Hoffman, who was then the mayor of New York City.

In the Summer of 1869, he was illegally arrested with other Albany and Susquehanna Railroad executive members during Jay Gould and Jim Fisk's attempt to buy the railroad.

== Personal life ==
In 1841, Pruyn married Jane Ann Lansing (1811–1886), a member of another prominent Albany family. Her father, Gerrit Yates Lansing, was a U.S. Representative who served as the chancellor of the University of the State of New York. Together, Robert and Jane were the parents of four children, including:

- Edward Pruyn (1843–1862)
- Robert Clarence Pruyn (1847–1934), who was a prominent banker and leader of the American toy industry.
- Helen Lansing Pruyn (1849–1854)
- Charles Lansing Pruyn (1852–1906)

He died suddenly in 1882 in Albany. His remains are interred at Albany Rural Cemetery, Section 30, Lot 14.

== Electoral history ==
1866 General election results
Governor candidate	Running Mate	Party	Popular Vote	
Reuben E. Fenton	Stewart L. Woodford	Republican	366,315	(50.96%)
John Thompson Hoffman	Robert H. Pruyn	Conservative Union	352,526	(49.04%)

== Notes ==
New York State Assembly
Preceded by Valentine Treadwell	New York State Assembly; Albany County, 3rd District; 1848–1853	Succeeded by Alexander Davidson
Preceded by William W. Forsyth	New York State Assembly; Albany County, 3rd District; 1854–1854	Succeeded by Alexander Davidson
Political offices
Preceded by Noble S. Elderkin	Speaker of the New York State Assembly; 1850	Succeeded by Ferral C. Dininny
Preceded by William H. Ludlow	Speaker of the New York State Assembly; 1854	Succeeded by DeWitt Clinton Littlejohn
Diplomatic posts
Preceded by Townsend Harris	U.S. Minister to Japan; 1861–1865	Succeeded by Robert B. Van Valkenburgh
