= Senator Beach =

Senator Beach may refer to:

- Bob Beach (born 1959), West Virginia State Senate
- Brandon Beach (born 1961), Georgia State Senate
- George Beach (politician) (1817–?), New York State Senate
- James Beach (born 1946), New Jersey State Senate
- Nelson J. Beach (1800–1876), New York State Senate
- William Beach (American politician) (1810s–1860), New York State Senate
- Zadoc P. Beach (1861–after 1933), Wisconsin State Senate
