= Senator Cornwell =

Senator Cornwell may refer to:

- John J. Cornwell (1867–1953), West Virginia State Senate
- William J. Cornwell (1809–1896), New York State Senate
