= Rossville points =

Native American flintknapping style

Rossville point

Rossville points are a type of arrowhead first recognized as a unique Native American cultural indicator in 1909 by archaeologists of the American Museum of Natural History. They were named by archaeologist Alanson Skinner after the Rossville section of Staten Island, New York, where they were found in the vicinity of the old U.S. Post Office building.

Rossville points are indicative of the very late Archaic, Transitional, and Early Woodland periods, dating from approximately 3300 to 2700 B.P and are usually found in the Chesapeake Bay area, Southern New York, and New England.

== See also ==
- Burial Ridge
- Flintknapping
- Projectile points
