= Senator Coffin =

Senator Coffin may refer to:

- Alexander J. Coffin (1794–1868), New York State Senate
- Bob Coffin (born 1942), Nevada State Senate
- Charles E. Coffin (1841–1912), Maryland State Senate
- Owen Vincent Coffin (1836–1921), Connecticut State Senate
- Peleg Coffin Jr. (1756–1805), Massachusetts State Senate
