= 71st New York State Legislature =

New York state legislative session

←	70th	72nd	→
- The Old State Capitol (1879)

Overview
- Legislative body: New York State Legislature
- Jurisdiction: New York, United States
- Term: January 1 – December 31, 1848

Senate
- Members: 32
- President: Lt. Gov. Hamilton Fish (W)
- Party control: Whig (24-8)

Assembly
- Members: 128
- Speaker: Amos K. Hadley (W)
- Party control: Whig (93-35)

Sessions
- 1st: January 4 – April 12, 1848

The 71st New York State Legislature, consisting of the New York State Senate and the New York State Assembly, met from January 4 to April 12, 1848, during the second year of John Young's governorship, in Albany.

== Background ==
Under the provisions of the New York Constitution of 1846, 32 Senators were elected in single-seat senatorial districts for a two-year term, the whole Senate being renewed biennially. The senatorial districts (except those in New York City) were made up of entire counties. 128 Assemblymen were elected in single-seat districts to a one-year term, the whole Assembly being renewed annually. The Assembly districts were made up of entire towns, or city wards, forming a contiguous area, all in the same county. The City and County of New York was divided into four senatorial districts, and 16 Assembly districts.

On September 27, the Legislative passed "An Act to provide for the election of a Lieutenant Governor", to fill the vacancy caused by the resignation of Addison Gardiner.

At this time there were two major political parties: the Democratic Party and the Whig Party. The Democratic Party was split into two factions: the "Barnburners" and the "Hunkers." The radical abolitionists appeared as the Liberty Party. The Anti-Rent Party nominated some candidates, but mostly cross-endorsed Whigs or Democrats, according to their opinion on the rent issue. The Native American Party (later better known as "Know Nothings") also ran.

== Elections ==
The 1847 New York state election was held on November 3. Hamilton Fish (W) was elected Lieutenant Governor; and all the other eleven statewide elective offices were won by the Whigs.

24 Whigs and 8 Democrats were elected to the State Senate. 93 Whigs and 35 Democrats were elected to the Assembly.

== Sessions ==
The Legislature met for the regular session at the Old State Capitol in Albany on January 4, 1848; and adjourned on April 12.

Amos K. Hadley (W) was elected Speaker with 89 votes against 22 for Henry Wager (D).

== State Senate ==
=== Districts ===
- 1st District: Queens, Richmond and Suffolk counties
- 2nd District: Kings County
- 3rd District: 1st, 2nd, 3rd, 4th, 5th and 6th wards of New York City
- 4th District: 7th, 10th, 13th and 17th wards of New York City
- 5th District: 8th, 9th and 14th wards of New York City
- 6th District: 11th, 12th, 15th, 16th, 18th, 19th, 20th, 21st and 22nd wards of New York City
- 7th District: Putnam, Rockland and Westchester counties
- 8th District: Columbia and Dutchess counties
- 9th District: Orange and Sullivan counties
- 10th District: Greene and Ulster counties
- 11th District: Albany and Schenectady counties
- 12th District: Rensselaer County
- 13th District: Saratoga and Washington counties
- 14th District: Clinton, Essex and Warren counties
- 15th District: Franklin and St. Lawrence counties
- 16th District: Fulton, Hamilton, Herkimer and Montgomery counties
- 17th District: Delaware and Schoharie counties
- 18th District: Chenango and Otsego counties
- 19th District: Oneida County
- 20th District: Madison and Oswego counties
- 21st District: Jefferson and Lewis counties
- 22nd District: Onondaga County
- 23rd District: Broome, Cortland and Tioga counties
- 24th District: Cayuga and Wayne counties
- 25th District: Seneca, Tompkins and Yates counties
- 26th District: Chemung and Steuben counties
- 27th District: Monroe County
- 28th District: Genesee, Niagara and Orleans counties
- 29th District: Livingston and Ontario counties
- 30th District: Allegany and Wyoming counties
- 31st District: Erie County
- 32nd District: Cattaraugus and Chautauqua counties
Note: There are now 62 counties in the State of New York. The counties which are not mentioned in this list had not yet been established, or sufficiently organized, the area being included in one or more of the abovementioned counties.

=== Members ===
The asterisk (*) denotes members of the previous Legislature who continued in office as members of this Legislature. Valentine Treadwell and William J. Cornwell changed from the Assembly to the Senate.

Party affiliations follow the vote on Clerk and Sergeant-at-Arms.

District	Senator	Party	Notes
1st	John G. Floyd	Democrat	
2nd	David A. Bokee	Whig	on November 7, 1848, elected to the 31st U.S. Congress
3rd	William Hall	Whig	
4th	John L. Lawrence	Whig	
5th	Samuel Frost	Whig	
6th	William Samuel Johnson	Whig	
7th	Saxton Smith*	Democrat	
8th	Alexander J. Coffin	Whig	
9th	Samuel J. Wilkin	Whig	
10th	Platt Adams	Democrat	
11th	Valentine Treadwell*	Whig	
12th	Albert R. Fox	Whig	
13th	James M. Cook	Whig	
14th	James S. Whallon	Democrat	
15th	John Fine	Democrat	
16th	Thomas Burch	Whig	
17th	John M. Betts	Democrat	
18th	David H. Little	Whig	
19th	Thomas E. Clark	Whig	
20th	Thomas H. Bond	Whig	
21st	John W. Tamblin	Democrat	
22nd	George Geddes	Whig	
23rd	Samuel H. P. Hall*	Whig	
24th	William J. Cornwell*	Whig	
25th	Timothy S. Williams	Whig	
26th	William M. Hawley	Democrat	
27th	Jerome Fuller	Whig	
28th	A. Hyde Cole	Whig	
29th	Allen Ayrault	Whig	resigned his seat on June 2, 1848
30th	John W. Brownson	Whig	
31st	John T. Bush	Whig	
32nd	Frederick S. Martin	Whig	

=== Employees ===
- Clerk: Andrew H. Calhoun
- Deputy Clerks: John P. Lott, J. N. T. Tucker
- Sergeant-at-Arms: Senter M. Giddings
- Doorkeeper: Ransom Van Valkenburgh
- Assistant Doorkeeper: George A. Loomis
- Reporter (Albany Argus): William G. Bishop
- Reporter (Evening Journal): Frans. S. Rew
- Messengers: John Manning, Richard E. Nagle
- Janitor: David Emery

== State Assembly ==
=== Assemblymen ===
The asterisk (*) denotes members of the previous Legislature who continued as members of this Legislature.

Party affiliations follow the vote on Speaker.

District		Assemblymen	Party	Notes
Albany	1st	Edward S. Willett	Whig	
Albany	2nd	Frederick Mathias	Whig	
Albany	3rd	Robert H. Pruyn	Whig	
Albany	4th	Henry A. Brigham	Whig	
Allegany	1st	John Wheeler	Whig	
Allegany	2nd	William Cobb	Democrat	
Broome		Jeremiah Hull	Whig	
Cattaraugus	1st	James G. Johnson	Whig	
Cattaraugus	2nd	Marcus H. Johnson		
Cayuga	1st	Ebenezer Curtis	Whig	
Cayuga	2nd	John I. Brinckerhoff	Whig	
Cayuga	3rd	Hector C. Tuthill	Whig	
Chautauqua	1st	John H. Pray	Whig	
Chautauqua	2nd	David H. Treadway	Whig	
Chemung		George W. Buck	Whig	
Chenango	1st	Levi H. Case	Democrat	
Chenango	2nd	Ezra P. Church	Whig	
Clinton		Rufus Heaton*	Democrat	
Columbia	1st	Jonas H. Miller	Whig	
Columbia	2nd	Charles B. Osborn	Whig	
Cortland		James Comstock	Whig	
Delaware	1st	Platt Townsend		
Delaware	2nd	John Calhoun	Whig	
Dutchess	1st	Edgar Vincent	Whig	
Dutchess	2nd	David Collins Jr.	Whig	
Dutchess	3rd	James Hammond	Whig	
Erie	1st	Elbridge G. Spaulding	Whig	on November 7, 1848, elected to the 31st U.S. Congress
Erie	2nd	Harry Slade	Whig	
Erie	3rd	Ira E. Irish	Whig	
Erie	4th	Charles C. Severance	Whig	
Essex		William H. Butrick*	Whig	
Franklin		Elos L. Winslow	Democrat	
Fulton and Hamilton		Isaac Benedict	Democrat	
Genesee	1st	Tracy Pardee	Whig	
Genesee	2nd	Alonzo S. Upham*	Whig	
Greene	1st	Alexander H. Palmer	Whig	
Greene	2nd	Frederick A. Fenn	Democrat	
Herkimer	1st	James Feeter	Whig	
Herkimer	2nd	Lawrence L. Merry	Whig	
Jefferson	1st	Benjamin Maxson	Democrat	
Jefferson	2nd	Harvey D. Parker	Democrat	
Jefferson	3rd	Fleury Keith	Democrat	
Kings	1st	Ebenezer W. Peck*	Whig	
Kings	2nd	Edwards W. Fiske	Whig	
Kings	3rd	John A. Cross	Whig	
Lewis		David D. Reamer	Whig	
Livingston	1st	Gurdon Nowlen	Whig	Nowlan
Livingston	2nd	Nathaniel Coe	Whig	
Madison	1st	John T. G. Bailey	Whig	
Madison	2nd	George Grant	Democrat	
Monroe	1st	Ezra Sheldon	Whig	
Monroe	2nd	Abraham M. Schermerhorn	Whig	on November 7, 1848, elected to the 31st U.S. Congress
Monroe	3rd	Isaac Chase Jr.	Whig	
Montgomery	1st	Asa Bowman	Whig	
Montgomery	2nd	William A. Haslet	Democrat	
New York	1st	J. Phillips Phoenix	Whig	on November 7, 1848, elected to the 31st U.S. Congress
New York	2nd	James Bowen	Whig	
New York	3rd	John H. Bowie*	Democrat	
New York	4th	John F. Rodman	Whig	
New York	5th	Peter H. Titus	Whig	
New York	6th	Samuel G. Raymond	Whig	
New York	7th	William B. Meech	Whig	
New York	8th	Thomas Charlock	Democrat	
New York	9th	Dennis Garrison*	Democrat	
New York	10th	Martin H. Truesdell	Whig	
New York	11th	Alexander Stewart*	Democrat	
New York	12th	Michael Walsh*	Democrat	
New York	13th	Erastus C. Benedict	Whig	
New York	14th	Robert G. Campbell	Whig	
New York	15th	Merwin R. Brewer	Whig	
New York	16th	James Brooks	Whig	on November 7, 1848, elected to the 31st U.S. Congress
Niagara	1st	Elias Ransom	Whig	
Niagara	2nd	Solomon Moss	Democrat	contested by Morgan Johnson (W) who was seated on April 1
Oneida	1st	Luke Smith	Whig	
Oneida	2nd	Warren Converse	Whig	
Oneida	3rd	Bloomfield J. Beach	Whig	
Oneida	4th	Henry Wager	Democrat	
Onondaga	1st	James Little	Democrat	
Onondaga	2nd	Horace Hazen	Whig	
Onondaga	3rd	Thomas Spencer	Whig	
Onondaga	4th	Curtis J. Hurd	Whig	
Ontario	1st	Charles S. Brother	Whig	
Ontario	2nd	Hiram Ashley	Whig	
Orange	1st	Stephen Rapelje	Whig	
Orange	2nd	George Houston	Whig	
Orange	3rd	Augustus P. Thompson	Whig	
Orleans		Arba Chubb	Whig	
Oswego	1st	M. Lindley Lee*	Whig	
Oswego	2nd	Andrew Z. McCarty	Whig	
Otsego	1st	Benjamin Davis	Whig	
Otsego	2nd	Olcott C. Chamberlin		
Otsego	3rd	Elisha S. Sanders	Democrat	
Putnam		Chauncey R. Weeks	Whig	
Queens		Wessell S. Smith*	Whig	
Rensselaer	1st	Amos K. Hadley*	Whig	elected Speaker
Rensselaer	2nd	George T. Denison	Whig	
Rensselaer	3rd	George W. Glass	Whig	
Richmond		Ephraim J. Totten	Whig	
Rockland		Lawrence J. Sneden	Whig	
St. Lawrence	1st	Charles G. Myers	Democrat	also D.A. of St. Lawrence County
St. Lawrence	2nd	John S. Chipman	Whig	
St. Lawrence	3rd	Benjamin Holmes	Whig	
Saratoga	1st	Cady Hollister	Democrat	
Saratoga	2nd	George Payn	Whig	
Schenectady		Abraham W. Toll	Democrat	
Schoharie	1st	Adam Mattice	Democrat	
Schoharie	2nd	James Parsons	Democrat	
Seneca		John Kennedy	Democrat	
Steuben	1st	Abel Kendall	Democrat	
Steuben	2nd	John G. Mersereau	Whig	
Steuben	3rd	Alexander H. Stephens		
Suffolk	1st	Edwin Rose	Whig	
Suffolk	2nd	William Sidney Smith	Democrat	
Sullivan		James F. Bush	Whig	
Tioga		Erastus Goodrich	Democrat	
Tompkins	1st	John Jessup	Whig	
Tompkins	2nd	Alpheus West	Whig	
Ulster	1st	George A. Gay	Whig	
Ulster	2nd	Job G. Elmore	Whig	
Warren		Albert Cheney	Whig	
Washington	1st	Benjamin Crocker	Whig	
Washington	2nd	Elisha A. Martin	Whig	
Wayne	1st	Eliada Pettit	Whig	
Wayne	2nd	John Lapham	Whig	
Westchester	1st	Richard M. Underhill	Whig	
Westchester	2nd	Jared V. Peck	Democrat	
Wyoming		Paul Richards	Whig	
Yates		Hatley N. Dox	Whig	

=== Employees ===
- Clerk: Philander B. Prindle
- Deputy Clerks: Edgar A. Barber, William E. Mills, Friend W. Humphrey
- Sergeant-at-Arms: Samuel H. Marks
- Assistant Sergeant-at-Arms: William Van Olinda
- Doorkeeper: John Davies
- First Assistant Doorkeeper: Samuel Merclean
- Second Assistant Doorkeeper: Erasmus D. S. Strong
- Doorkeeper for the Gentlemen's Gallery: Isaac Betticker
- Dorrkeeper for the Ladies' Gallery: Alexander Hamilton Stoutenburgh
- Porter: George Fonda
- Librarians: Ira Dubois, John T. Diossey
- Messengers: William Freeman, George W. Weed, Peter Craff, Edward Martin, James Whelpley, Seymour Daley, Harris Fellows, Peter Drum, Andrew Ryan, Penfield Strong, Webster Gardiner, Eugene Rearden, A. W. Baker

== Sources ==
- The New York Civil List compiled by Franklin Benjamin Hough (Weed, Parsons and Co., 1858) [pg. 109 for Senate districts; pg. 136 for senators; pg. 148–157 for Assembly districts; pg. 234ff for assemblymen]
- Documents of the Senate (71st Session) (1848; pg. 61ff
