= Senator Fine =

Senator Fine may refer to:

- John Fine (politician) (1794–1867), New York State Senate
- Laura Fine (born 1966), Illinois State Senate
- Randy Fine (born 1974), Florida State Senate
- Sidney A. Fine (1903–1982), New York State Senate
