= Senator Bellinger =

Senator Bellinger may refer to:

- Frederick P. Bellinger (1792–1876), New York State Senate
- Joseph Bellinger (1773–1830), South Carolina State Senate
