= George R. Babcock =

American lawyer and politician

George Reed Babcock (September 20, 1806 – September 22, 1876) was an American lawyer and politician from New York.

== Life ==
He was the son of William Babcock and Julia (Reed) Babcock. He was born in that part of the Town of Gorham which in 1822 was separated as the Town of Hopewell, in Ontario County, New York. In 1824, he removed to Buffalo, and studied law with Heman B. Potter, then D.A. of Erie County. Babcock was admitted to the bar in 1829, and practiced in partnership with Potter. On May 13, 1835, he married Mary Bradley Potter (1815–1877), his law partner's oldest daughter, and they had three children.

He was a member of the New York State Assembly (Erie Co.) in 1843.

He was a member of the New York State Senate (31st D.) from 1850 to 1853, sitting in the 73rd, 74th, 75th and 76th New York State Legislatures.

In 1876, he was appointed by Gov. Samuel J. Tilden a member of the Commission to Inspect the State Prisons. While inspecting Clinton State Prison at Dannemora, in Clinton County, New York, he contracted a fever, and died on September 22, 1876, at the home of the prison's Warden. He was buried at the Forest Lawn Cemetery in Buffalo, New York.

== Sources ==
- The New York Civil List compiled by Franklin Benjamin Hough (pages 136ff, 227 and 256; Weed, Parsons and Co., 1858)
- Babcock Genealogy by Stephen Babcock (e-book)

New York State Senate
Preceded by John T. Bush	New York State Senate; 31st District; 1850–1853	Succeeded by James O. Putnam
