= George Geddes (engineer) =

American engineer and politician

George Geddes (February 14, 1809 – October 7, 1883) was an American engineer, agronomist, historian and politician from New York.

== Life ==
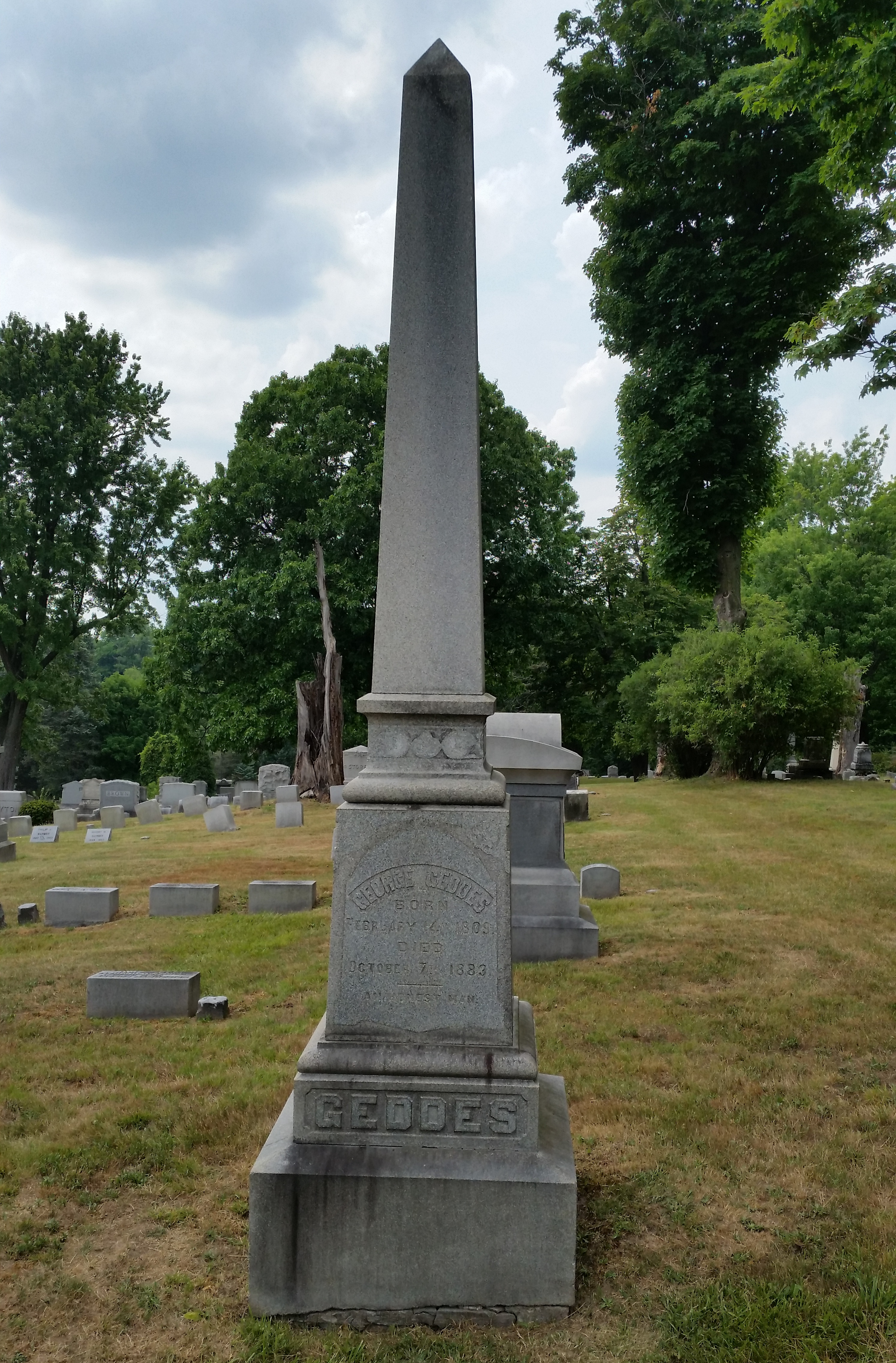
George Geddes memorial, Oakwood Cemetery, Syracuse, NY

He was the son of engineer, surveyor and Congressman James Geddes.

George Geddes studied engineering and surveying in Middletown, Connecticut, and law in Skaneateles, New York.

He was a member of the New York State Senate (22nd D.) from 1848 to 1851, sitting in the 71st, 72nd, 73rd and 74th New York State Legislatures. He was one of three state senators instrumental in the passage of the 1848 New York State law permitting women to hold property independently of their husbands, the first of its kind in the United States. He served on the New York State Senate's Indian Affairs committee and wrote articles about Iroquois history and archaeology. Originally a Whig, he later joined the Republican Party. He was a moderate abolitionist.

Geddes was well known nationally in agricultural circles for his model farm at Fairmount, and was an occasional agricultural and political columnist for the New York Tribune. He was an early mentor to Frederick Law Olmsted. He also built the first plank road in America, at North Syracuse, New York, in 1846.

In 1861, he was president of the New York State Agricultural Society.

His son James Geddes (born November 19, 1831) was a civil engineer, agriculturist, and assemblyman in 1883.

== Bibliography ==
- Holt, Michael (1999). The Rise and Fall of the American Whig Party. Oxford: Oxford University Press.
- Mitchell, Broadus (1924). Frederick Law Olmsted: Critic of the Old South. Baltimore: Johns Hopkins University Press.
- Stanton, Elizabeth Cady et al. (1887). History of Woman Suffrage. Rochester: Self-published.

New York State Senate
Preceded by new district	New York State Senate; 22nd District; 1848–1851	Succeeded by James Munroe
