= Samuel J. Wilkin =

American politician

Samuel Jones Wilkin
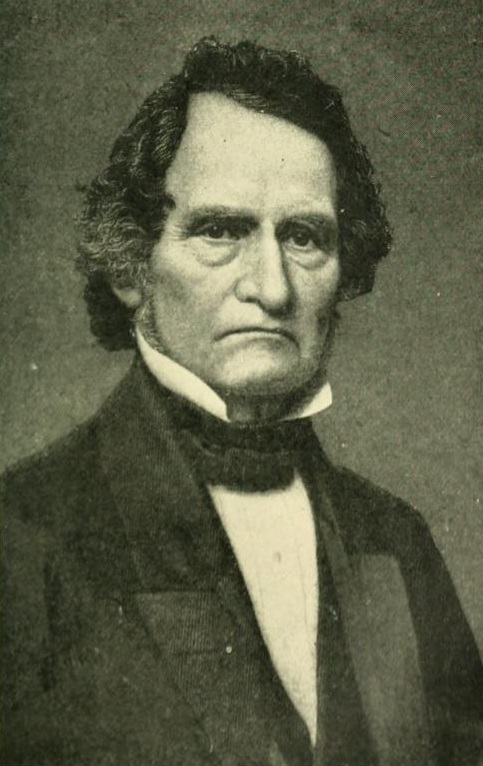
- Samuel J. Wilkin, Congressman from New York
- Born: December 17, 1793; Goshen, New York, US
- Died: March 11, 1866 (aged 72); Goshen, New York, US
- Education: Princeton College
- Occupations: Attorney, politician
- Known for: U.S. Representative from New York
- Children: Alexander Wilkin

Samuel Jones Wilkin (December 17, 1793 – March 11, 1866) was a U.S. representative from New York, son of James W. Wilkin.

Born in Goshen, New York, Wilkin graduated from Princeton College in 1812.

He studied law. He was admitted to the bar in 1815 and practiced in Goshen.

He was a member of the New York State Assembly (Orange Co.) in 1824 and 1825.

Wilkin was elected as an Anti-Jacksonian to the Twenty-second Congress (March 4, 1831 – March 3, 1833).

He was an unsuccessful Whig candidate for election in 1844 as Lieutenant Governor of New York.

He was a member of the New York State Senate (9th D.) in 1848 and 1849. He was a state canal appraiser in 1850.

He died in Goshen, New York, March 11, 1866. He was interred in Slate Hill Cemetery.

His son, Alexander Wilkin, died in the Civil War.

== Sources ==
- United States Congress. "Samuel J. Wilkin (id: W000473)". Biographical Directory of the United States Congress.

U.S. House of Representatives
Preceded by Samuel W. Eager	Member of the U.S. House of Representatives from New York's 6th congressional district 1831–1833	Succeeded by John W. Brown
New York State Senate
Preceded by new district	New York State Senate; 9th District; 1848–1849	Succeeded by James C. Curtis
