= John W. Tamblin =

American politician

John W. Tamblin (died May 25, 1874) was an American lawyer, newspaper editor and politician from New York.

== Life ==
He was admitted to the bar in 1831, and practiced in Evans Mills, New York.

He was a member of the New York State Assembly (Jefferson County) in 1837 and 1842.

He was a member of the New York State Senate (21st District) in 1848 and 1849.

From December 1851 to March 1853, and again from September 1853 on, he co-published the Jeffersonian (a weekly paper) in Watertown.

He was buried at the Old Evans Mills Cemetery.

== Sources ==
- The New York Civil List compiled by Franklin Benjamin Hough (pages 136, 146, 219, 222, 226 and 308; Weed, Parsons and Co., 1858)
- A History of Jefferson County by Franklin Benjamin Hough (Albany NY, 1854; pg. 375)

New York State Senate
Preceded by new district	New York State Senate; 21st District; 1848–1849	Succeeded by Alanson Skinner
