= George B. Guinnip =

American politician

George B. Guinnip (September 12, 1794 in Hunterdon County, New Jersey – July 20, 1869 in Watkins, Schuyler County, New York) was an American merchant and politician from New York.

== Life ==
In 1817, he removed to Dryden, New York. He married Sarah Hart (1798–1884), and they had several children.

He was a member of the New York State Assembly (Tompkins Co.) in 1834 and 1836.

Before 1849, he removed to Salubria, then in Chemung County. This village was subsequently renamed Jefferson, then Watkins, and in 1926 Watkins Glen. It has been the county seat of Schuyler County since it was formed in 1854.

He was a member of the New York State Senate (26th D.) in 1850 and 1851. He was among the 12 state senators who resigned on April 17, 1851, to prevent a quorum in the Senate.

He was buried at the Glenwood Cemetery in Watkins Glen.

== Sources ==
- The New York Civil List compiled by Franklin Benjamin Hough (pages 136, 141, 216, 218 and 277; Weed, Parsons and Co., 1858)

New York State Senate
Preceded by William M. Hawley	New York State Senate; 26th District; 1850–1851	Succeeded by William J. Gilbert
