= Edwards W. Fiske =

American businessman and politician

Edwards W. Fiske (June 30, 1805 – August 19, 1874) was an American businessman and politician from New York.

== Life ==
Fiske was born on June 30, 1805, in New Braintree, Massachusetts. He was the son of Rev. John Fiske, a prominent Congregationalist clergyman. He moved to New York City in 1828, working as a clerk for abolitionist Arthur Tappen's dry goods house for the two years. He then spent the next five years working as a clerk in a different large firm.

In 1835, Fiske moved to Brooklyn, where he worked for several years as a traveling business agent for several large dry goods firms and travelled all over the country. He later invested in real estate, and owned large tracts of land in Prospect Hill and a farm in Gowanus. He was involved an early supporter in the development of Prospect Park, and served on its Board of Commissioners from its inception to his death.

In 1847, Fiske was elected to the New York State Assembly, representing the Kings County 2nd District. He served in the Assembly in 1848, 1849, and 1850. He was elected as a Whig, but he joined the Republican Party when it was organized. He initially supported William H. Seward when he ran for President in 1860, but he served as a Presidential elector for Abraham Lincoln and Hannibal Hamlin in the 1860 United States presidential election.

Fiske died at home on August 19, 1874. He was buried in Green-Wood Cemetery.

New York State Assembly
Preceded by District Created	New York State Assembly; Kings County, 2nd District; 1848-1850	Succeeded by Howard C. Cady
