= William C. Crain =

American politician

William Cullen Crain (August 31, 1798, in Warren, Herkimer County, New York – March 16, 1865) was an American medical doctor and politician.

== Life ==
His father was Rufus Crain, a physician, a judge of the Court of Common Pleas for sixteen years, and a near relative of General Israel Putnam.

He entered his father's office as a student of medicine, and practiced for about two years. Then he gave up the practice of medicine, and occupied himself with agriculture, his landed interests in Warren being considerable.

In 1826, he married Perses Narina Tunnicliff, daughter of William Tunnicliff, and granddaughter of the Count George Ernst August von Ranzau, an officer on the staff of the Friedrich Adolf Riedesel, and author of the interesting Journal of Burgoyne's Expedition contained in the archives of the general staff at Berlin. They had seven children (Philotheta Lucetta Crain Bowers, 1827; Rufus William Crain, 1829; Dunham Jones Crain, 1831; Charlotte Ranzau Crain, 1835; William Baker Crain, 1883; Bianca Louisa Crain, 1844; and Richard Tunnicliff Crain, 1883).

Crain was politically a Democrat of the Jeffersonian school. He was a member from Herkimer County of the New York State Assembly in 1832, 1845 and 1846, and was Speaker in 1846.

He was Sheriff of Herkimer County from 1840 to 1843. In 1852, he was a presidential elector on the Democratic ticket, voting for Franklin Pierce.

In 1860, he ran unsuccessfully for Lieutenant Governor of New York. He was many times a delegate to Democratic National Conventions, and often represented his party in state conventions.

New York County D.A. Thomas C. T. Crain was his grandson.

== Sources ==
- Bio at Rootsweb
- Herkimer County Crimes listing county officials
- Obit of his son, in NYT on March 10, 1907
- The New York Civil List compiled by Franklin Benjamin Hough, Stephen C. Hutchins and Edgar Albert Werner (1867; page 579)

Political offices
Preceded by Horatio Seymour	Speaker of the New York State Assembly; 1846	Succeeded by William C. Hasbrouck
