= John T. Bush =

American politician

John T. Bush (April 16, 1811 Fort Ann, Washington County, New York – November 10, 1888) was an American lawyer, businessman and politician from New York.

== Life ==
He began practicing law in Tonawanda, New York in 1836, and the following year became a Justice of the Peace. He was a member of the New York State Assembly (Erie Co.) in 1845 and 1846. On October 1, 1846, he married Mary Owen Ford, and they had four daughters. He served as a member of the New York State Senate (31st D.) in 1848 and 1849.

On March 26, 1851, he received a recess appointment by President Millard Fillmore as U.S. Marshal for the Northern District of New York, was confirmed by the U.S. Senate on January 15, 1852, and remained in office until April 1853 when he resigned. In 1854, he removed to Niagara Falls, New York, and built the "International Hotel" there. In 1864, he bought the Zimmerman estate in Clifton Hill, Niagara Falls, Ontario, Canada, built the "Clifton Place" mansion, and went to live there. In 1867, he became the first President of the Clifton Suspension Bridge Company in the United States; and in 1868, he was among the incorporators of the Clifton Suspension Bridge Company in Canada.

Assemblyman William T. Bush was his brother.

== Sources ==
- The New York Civil List compiled by Franklin Benjamin Hough (pages 136, 139, 230f and 263; Weed, Parsons and Co., 1858)
- List of U.S. Marshals, New York
- Sale of the Clifton House, Niagara Falls, New York Times, September 11, 1864
- New Suspension Bridge at Niagara in The Railway News (issue of June 8, 1867; p. 570)
- Statutes of the Province of Ontario (1868; pg. 208f)
- Obituary, copied at RootsWeb
- Bissell - Bush (his daughter Annie's marriage), New York Times, June 12, 1892

New York State Senate
| Preceded by new district | New York State Senate; 31st District; 1848–1849 | Succeeded by George R. Babcock |
