= Samuel Barrett (New York politician) =

American politician (1792–1872)

Member of the New York State Assembly
- In office January 1, 1850 – December 31, 1850
- Preceded by: Silas Terry; Ezekiel B. Gurnsey
- Succeeded by: Austin W. Smith; Daniel W. Douglass

Personal details
- Born: June 29, 1792 Paris, New York
- Died: July 23, 1872 (aged 80) Jamestown, New York
- Resting place: Lake View Cemetery; Jamestown, New York, U.S.
- Party: Whig
- Spouse: Betsey Hunt
- Occupation: Businessman, banker, politician

Samuel Barrett (June 29, 1792 – July 23, 1872) was an American businessman, banker, and politician from Chautauqua County, New York. He represented the county in the New York State Assembly in 1850.

== Biography ==
=== Early life and career ===
Barrett was born on June 29, 1792 in Paris, New York. He served in the military and was a Major. He settled in Jamestown, New York in May 1816 along with Daniel Hazeltine. He was a hotel keeper, tanner, lumberman, and merchant. He was in business with Samuel Budlong, Charles Butler, Henry Baker, and others. In 1827, Baker purchased an interested in the Budlong & Baker store, formerly J.E.&S. Budlong. When Budlong retired in 1830, the store became Barrett & Baker.

He was involved in the established of the first bank in Jamestown, New York. He served as Vice President at one time. On June 9, 1835, he was elected President of the Chautauqua County Bank. He served in that position for 37 years. He was said to have been "a sound, level-headed and energetic business man." In 1835, he was appointed to a Jamestown committee, along with Elial Foote, Oliver Lee, Leverett Barker, and George T. Camp, to confer with the Holland Land Company proprietors at Batavia regarding unsettled land contracts.

When James Prendergast, founder and namesake of the village, retired in 1836, Barrett was among those who purchased some of his landholdings. The same year, he was among those establishing Jamestown Academy.

Barrett was also a mason. He was a charter member of the Western Sun Chapter No. 67 of the Royal Arch Masonry and of the Ellicott Lodge No. 221 I.O.O.F. In 1848, Samuel Barrett, along with Rufus Green, Judah Budlong, Silas Tiffany, and Nathan A. Alexander, petitioned the Grand Master for a dispensation to form a new Masonic lodge in Jamestown after the decline of anti-Masonry. Their petition was granted, Masonic work was renewed, and at the next annual meeting of the Grand Lodge a charter was issued under the old name of Mount Moriah Lodge, now numbered 145.

=== Politics ===
In politics, Barrett was a member of the Whig Party. When Jamestown was incorporated as a village in 1827, he was elected as one of the first trustees. He served as Supervisor for the Town of Ellicott from 1831 to 1840 and again in 1844, and thus sat on the Chautauqua County Board of Supervisors. He was chairman of the Board of Supervisors in 1844.

In 1849, he ran for New York State Assembly against Reuben Fenton, then the chairman of the Chautauqua County Board of Supervisors and future Governor of New York. Barrett was elected, and served in the 73rd New York State Legislature in 1850 alongside John P. Hall.

=== Later life ===
Barrett died on July 23, 1872 in Jamestown at the age of 80. He was buried in Lake View Cemetery.
