= Thomas Crook =

American politician

Thomas Crook (May 22, 1798 Westminster, Windham County, Vermont – October 3, 1879) was an American politician from New York.

== Life ==
He was the son of James Crook (1777–1838) and Hannah (Martin) Crook (1767–1834). They removed to Beekmantown, New York before the War of 1812. On March 21, 1821, Thomas Crook married Hannah Elizabeth DeLong (1805–1874), and they had eight children.

In 1827, he was elected a Justice of the Peace of Beekmantown. He removed to the county seat, Plattsburgh, after his election as Sheriff. He was Sheriff of Clinton County from 1832 to 1834, and County Clerk from 1836 to 1838.

He was a member of the New York State Senate (2nd D.) in 1847; and (14th D.) again in 1850 and 1851.

He was buried at the Maple Hill Cemetery in Rouses Point, New York.

== Sources ==
- The New York Civil List compiled by Franklin Benjamin Hough (pages 135f, 140, 387 and 398; Weed, Parsons and Co., 1858)
- The New York State Register (1830; pg. 153)
- Crook genealogy at RootsWeb
- Maple Hill Cemetery inscriptions transcribed at RootsWeb

New York State Senate
Preceded by Thomas B. Mitchell	New York State Senate; Fourth District (Class 4); 1847	Succeeded by district abolished
Preceded by James S. Whallon	New York State Senate; 14th District; 1850–1851	Succeeded by Eli W. Rogers
