= Ferral C. Dininny =

American politician

Ferral Carlton Dininny (January 22, 1818 – July 24, 1901) was an American businessman and politician from the Southern Tier region of New York.

== Life ==
His father Ferral Dininny (1785–1876) came from County Cavan, Ireland to the United States and settled at Addison, Steuben County, New York. Among his children were William Dininny (b. 1810), Henry Ferral Dininny (b. 1815), Ferral Carlton Dininny, John W. Dininny, Owen Dininny (b. 1822) and Daniel Ensign Dininny.

Ferral C. Dininny was born in Otsego County, New York on January 22, 1818. He received his early education in the Otsego County district schools. Later he entered the Whitesboro Institute near Utica, New York, and finished his studies at the seminary in Lima, New York. He resolved to study law, and entered the law office of Andrew Chatsfiels in Addison.. He was admitted to the bar in 1845 in Bath, New York, and opened an office in Addison.

In December 1849, he married Altia F. Harford of Bedford, Westchester County, New York. Their only child, Ferral C. Dininny Jr., was born in 1851.

In 1850, he was a member of the New York State Assembly from Steuben County, New York. Dininny was chosen Speaker pro tempore for part of the 73rd session that year when Noble S. Elderkin of St. Lawrence County, New York, was called away by illness in his family. (Robert H. Pruyn of Albany also served as Speaker pro tempore for part of that session.) Dininny was chosen a presidential elector in 1852, and cast his ballot for the Democratic nominee, Franklin Pierce. He also was supervisor of Addison for 13 straight years, and became interested in the real estate business.

He was President of the Butler Colliery Company in Elmira, New York. He was also among the owners of the Blossburg Coal Company, in Blossburg, Pennsylvania, which obtained its charter by an act of the Legislature of Pennsylvania, approved April 11, 1866.

Dininny moved to Elmira, New York in 1872, and lived there in what was then known as the "Governor Randall" property on Water Street. His wife, Altia, died in 1896.

At the time of his death in July 1901, he was commonly supposed to be worth at least $1 million (about $25 million in today's dollar terms, based on data from the U.S. Bureau of Labor Statistics and Historical Statistics of the United States to 1970, Table E135-166), although many believed this estimate was too conservative. F.C. Dininny Jr., who lived in the greater New York City region, interred his parents' remains in an unknown cemetery in that area. They were subsequently moved to Kensico Cemetery in Valhalla, Westchester County, New York, in 1922.

== Sources ==
- Dininny ancestry, at Gen Forum
- Google Books The New York Civil List compiled by Franklin Benjamin Hough (Weed, Parsons & Co., Albany NY, 1858)
- History of The Seven Counties, by Joyce M. Tice
- Obituary published in the Elmira Advertiser on July 25, 1901

New York State Assembly
Preceded by John G. Mersereau	New York State Assembly; Steuben County, 2nd District; 1850	Succeeded by James H. Miles
Political offices
Preceded by Robert H. Pruyn	Speaker of the New York State Assembly; 1850	Succeeded by Henry Jarvis Raymond
