= Amos K. Hadley =

American politician

Amos Hadley
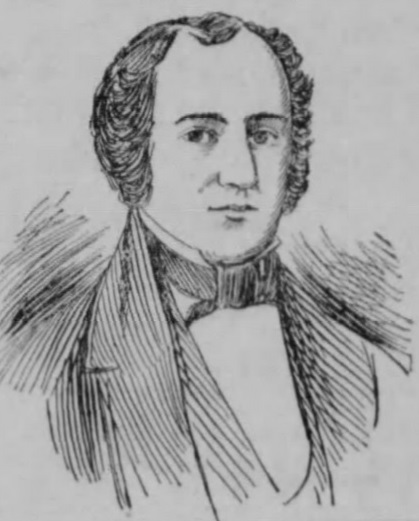

Personal details
- Born: Amos Kinne Hadley; October 12, 1812 Waterford, Vermont
- Died: March 5, 1901 (aged 88) Mount Vernon, New York
- Party: Whig

Amos Kinne Hadley (October 12, 1812 – March 5, 1901) was an American lawyer and politician who served as a member and speaker of the New York State Assembly.

== Early life and education ==
Hadley was born in Waterford, Vermont, the son of Stephen Hadley (1777–1861) and Sarah Cushman Hadley (1780–1867). He graduated from Hamilton College. Then he studied law with Judge John P. Cushman in Troy, New York, and was admitted to the bar in 1843.

== Career ==
Hadley served as a Whig member of the New York State Assembly in 1847 (Rensselaer Co.); 1848 and 1849 (both Rensselaer Co., 1st D.); and was Speaker in 1848 and 1849.

== Death ==
He died at the residence of his daughter in Mount Vernon, New York. He was buried at the Claverack Cemetery in Claverack, New York.

== Sources ==
- Courts and lawyers pages 1060-1073 at NY Court History
- Hadley Genealogy
- Hamilton College alumni reunion dinner in NYT, February 18, 1870
- COLBY FAMILY & OTHERS at freepages.genealogy.rootsweb.com Genealogy at Rootsweb
- Obit in NYT, on March 6, 1901 (erroneously giving first name as "Ernest", and age as "90" [he was 88])

Political offices
Preceded by William C. Hasbrouck	Speaker of the New York State Assembly; 1848–1849	Succeeded by Noble S. Elderkin
