= William A. Dart =

American politician

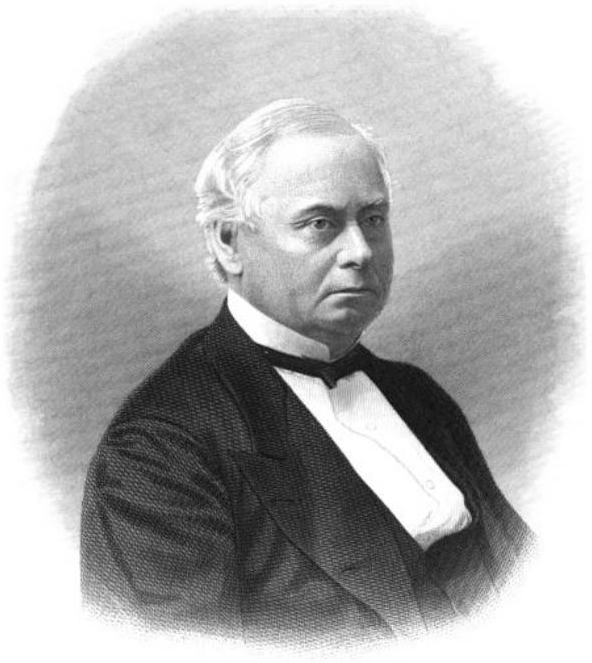
- Born: October 25, 1814; West Potsdam, New York
- Died: March 8, 1890 (aged 75); Potsdam, New York
- Occupations: Lawyer, politician
- Spouse: Harriet S. Allen (m. 1841)

William Allen Dart (October 25, 1814 – March 8, 1890) was an American lawyer and politician from New York.

== Life ==
William A. Dart was born in West Potsdam, New York on October 25, 1814, the son of Simeon Dart (1770–1859) and Phebe (Allen) Dart (1778–1873). He worked on his father's farm, attended St. Lawrence Academy and taught school. In 1834, he became a clerk in the law office of John Leslie Russell in Canton, New York, and the next year began to study law with Judge Horace Allen in Potsdam. Dart was admitted to the bar in 1840, and practiced in Potsdam. In September 1841, he married Judge Allen's daughter Harriet S. Allen (b. 1822), and they had two daughters.

He was appointed Postmaster of Potsdam in 1845, and was District Attorney of St. Lawrence County from 1845 to 1847. He joined the Free Soil Party in 1848.

He was a member of the New York State Senate (15th D.) in 1850 and 1851. He was among the 12 state senators who resigned on April 17, 1851, to prevent a quorum in the Senate; and was re-elected at the special election on May 27.

Upon its foundation in 1855, he joined the Republican Party. In April 1861, he was appointed by President Abraham Lincoln as United States Attorney for the Northern District of New York, and remained in office until 1866 when he was removed by President Andrew Johnson.

In 1869, he was appointed by President Ulysses S. Grant as U.S. Consul-General at Montreal, Quebec, Canada, and remained in office until 1878 when he resumed his law practice at Potsdam, in partnership with his son-in-law George Z. Erwin (1840–1894).

He died in Potsdam on March 8, 1890.

New York State Senate
Preceded by John Fine	New York State Senate; 15th District; 1850–1851	Succeeded by Henry B. Smith
Legal offices
Preceded by James Clark Spencer	U.S. Attorney for the Northern District of New York; 1861–1866	Succeeded by George G. Munger
