= Joseph B. Varnum Jr. =

American politician

Joseph Bradley Varnum Jr.

Member of the New York State Assembly
- In office 1849–1851
- Constituency: New York County

Speaker pro tempore of the New York State Assembly
- In office June 1851 – 1851

Member of the New York State Assembly
- In office 1857–1857
- Constituency: New York County, 13th District

Personal details
- Born: June 9, 1818
- Died: December 31, 1874 (aged 56)
- Resting place: Congressional Cemetery, Washington, D.C.
- Citizenship: American
- Party: Whig; Know Nothing
- Relatives: Joseph Bradley Varnum (grandfather)
- Education: Yale College
- Occupation: Lawyer, politician

Joseph Bradley Varnum Jr. (June 9, 1818 – December 31, 1874) was an American lawyer and politician.

== Life ==
He was a grandson of Joseph Bradley Varnum. He graduated from Yale College in 1838, where he was a member of Skull and Bones. He studied law at Yale and with Roger B. Taney in Baltimore, Maryland, and was admitted to the bar in 1840. He practiced law in Baltimore for several years before moving to New York City, where he acquired a large practice.

He was a Whig member of the New York State Assembly (New York Co.) in 1849, 1850 and 1851. Varnum was chosen Speaker pro tempore in June 1851, and presided over the Assembly for the duration of the special session. He was again a member of the State Assembly (New York Co., 13th D.) in 1857, and was the Know Nothing candidate for Speaker. At one time, he was a member of the Common Council of New York City.

In 1871, he took an active part in the agitation against corruption in the government of New York City. He was a contributor to magazines and newspapers, and published in book form The Seat of Government of the United States (New York, 1848) and The Washington Sketch-Book.

Varnum died on New Year's Eve, 1874. He was buried in Congressional Cemetery in Washington, D.C.

== Notes ==
New York State Assembly
Preceded by Erastus C. Benedict	New York State Assembly; New York County, 13th District; 1849–1851	Succeeded by William Taylor
Political offices
Preceded by Henry Jarvis Raymond	Speaker of the New York State Assembly; Acting; 1851	Succeeded by Jonas C. Heartt
New York State Assembly
Preceded by William A. Guest	New York State Assembly; New York County, 13th District; 1857	Succeeded by David J. Chatfield
