= William J. Cornwell =

American politician

William J. Cornwell (August 24, 1809 in Stanford, Dutchess County, New York – 1896) was an American lawyer and politician from New York.

== Life ==
He was the son of Eden Burroughs Cornwall (1766–1833) and Thankful (Harrison) Cornwall (c. 1765–1847). He married Marietta Sheldon, and they had three children.

He practiced law in Weedsport, New York.

He was a member of the New York State Assembly (Cayuga Co.) in 1846 and 1847.

He was a member of the New York State Senate (24th D.) in 1848 and 1849.

He was a Canal Appraiser from 1850 to 1855, and Auditor of the Canal Department from 1855 to 1856.

== See also ==
- List of New York state senators

== Sources ==
- The New York Civil List compiled by Franklin Benjamin Hough (pages 43f, 136, 140, 231, 233 and 267; Weed, Parsons and Co., 1858)
- William Cornwall and His Descendants by Edward Everett Cornwall (1901; pg. 45) [gives surname "Cornwall", but the Civil List and Legislature Journals always spell "Cornwell"]

New York State Senate
Preceded by new district	New York State Senate; 24th District; 1848–1849	Succeeded by William Beach
Government offices
Preceded by Marius Schoonmaker	Auditor of the New York State Canal Department; 1855–1856	Succeeded by Nathaniel S. Benton
