= Platt Adams (politician) =

American merchant and politician

Platt Adams (December 20, 1792 – May 12, 1887 in New York City) was an American merchant and politician from New York.

== Life ==
He was the son of Joseph Adams (d. 1832), and was born on the family farm about six miles below Catskill, then in Albany County, now in Greene County. He married Clarissa Dudley (1791–1857), and they had four children.

He was at times Postmaster of Durham; Supervisor of the Town of Durham, a Justice of the Peace, and a colonel of the State Militia.

He was a member of the New York State Assembly (Greene Co.) in 1820–21, Sheriff of Greene County from 1829 to 1831, and again a member of the State Assembly in 1839.

He was a member of the New York State Senate (10th D.) in 1848 and 1849.

On May 16, 1859, he married Jennie Eliza Montgomery (d. 1899).

Congressman John Adams (1778–1854) was his brother.

== Sources ==
- The New York Civil List compiled by Franklin Benjamin Hough (pages 136, 138, 197, 222, 255 and 400; Weed, Parsons and Co., 1858)
- Table of Post-Offices in the United States (1817; pg. 22)
- History of Durham and its Early Settlers transcribed at RootsWeb
- Platt Adams at Family Tree Maker

New York State Senate
Preceded by new district	New York State Senate; 10th District; 1848–1849	Succeeded by Marius Schoonmaker
