= James C. Curtis =

American lawyer and politician (1797–1881)

James Clark Curtis (October 28, 1797 – February 21, 1881) was an American lawyer and politician from New York. In the mid-19th century, he served in various local political offices, as well as a brief stint in the state senate from 1850 to 1851.

== Biography ==
He was born on October 28, 1797 St. Albans, Vermont.

In 1814, he removed to Sullivan County to take care of the estate of his uncle Edward Griswold, a large tract of land along the Delaware River, then located in the Town of Bethel. He married Pamelia C. Taylor (1799–1881), and they had several children.

=== Political career ===
In 1828, the Town of Cochecton was separated from Bethel, and Curtis was elected the first Supervisor in 1829, and was re-elected annually until 1844. He was also chairman of the board of Supervisors of Sullivan County from 1835 to 1843. He was a member of the New York State Assembly (Sullivan Co.) in 1831 and 1833.

He was First Judge of the Sullivan County Court from 1844 to 1847. He joined the Free Soil Party in 1848. He was a member of the New York State Senate (9th D.) in 1850 and 1851. He was among the 12 state senators who resigned on April 17, 1851, to prevent a quorum in the Senate; and was re-elected at the special election on May 27.

Upon its foundation in 1855, he joined the Republican Party. He was appointed by President Abraham Lincoln as Collector of Internal Revenue for his district, and remained in office until 1869.

=== Death and burial ===
He died on February 21, 1881, in Cochecton, New York. He was buried at the Curtis Eddy Cemetery in Cochecton.

== Sources ==
- The New York Civil List compiled by Franklin Benjamin Hough (pages 136, 140, 211, 214, 268 and 365; Weed, Parsons and Co., 1858) [gives wrong first name "John" on pg. 214 and 268]
- The Late Hon. James C. Curtis in the Monticello Republican Watchman on April 1, 1881

New York State Assembly
Preceded by Herman M. Hardenburgh	New York State Assembly; Sullivan County; 1831	Succeeded by Hiram Bennett
Preceded by Hiram Bennett	New York State Assembly; Sullivan County; 1833	Succeeded by Anthony Hasbrouck
New York State Senate
Preceded by Samuel J. Wilkin	New York State Senate; 9th District; 1850–1851	Succeeded by Nathaniel Jones
