= Richard S. Williams =

American politician

Richard S. Williams was an American merchant, banker and politician from New York.

== Life ==
He was a member of the New York State Assembly (New York Co.) in 1844.

He was a Governor of the Alms House of New York City from 1849 to 1853.

He was a member of the New York State Senate (3rd D.) in 1850 and 1851.

He was President of the Market Bank of New York City.

== Sources ==
- The New York Civil List compiled by Franklin Benjamin Hough (pages 136, 147, 229 and 316; Weed, Parsons and Co., 1858)
- Laws of the State of New York (1849; pg. 367; "AN ACT to provide for the government of the department of Alms and Penitentiary, in the city and county of New-York.")
- The Literary World (issue of October 22, 1853; pg. 206)
- THE MARKET BANK DEFALCATION in NYT on February 13, 1855

New York State Senate
Preceded by William Hall	New York State Senate; 3rd District; 1850 – 1851	Succeeded by William McMurray
