= William C. Hasbrouck =

American politician

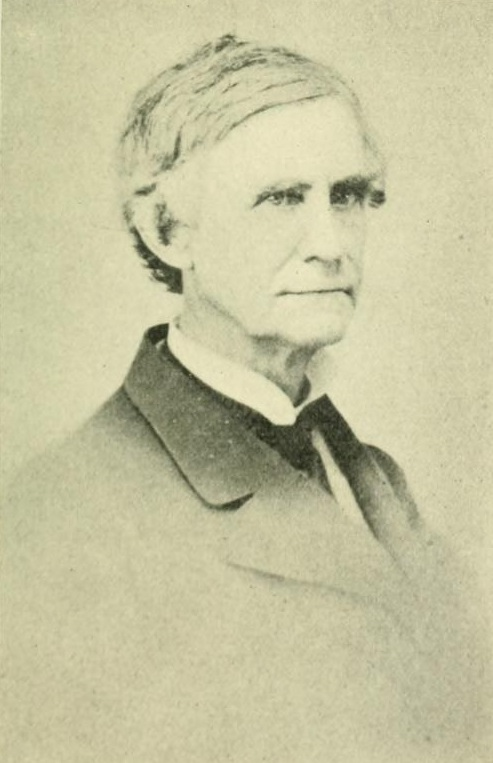
- Hasbrouck in a photo taken late in life

66th Speaker of the New York Assembly
- In office January 5, 1847 – December 31, 1847
- Preceded by: William C. Crain
- Succeeded by: Amos K. Hadley

Personal details
- Born: William Cornelius Hasbrouck; August 23, 1800 Hurley, New York, U.S.
- Died: November 5, 1870 Newburgh, New York, U.S.
- Resting place: Saint George's Cemetery, Newburgh, New York, U.S.
- Party: Whig
- Spouse: Mary Elizabeth Roe (m. 1831)
- Children: 9
- Education: Union College

William Cornelius Hasbrouck (August 23, 1800 – November 5, 1870 Newburgh, New York) was an American lawyer and politician.

== Life ==
He was the first child born to Cornelius Benjamin Hasbrouck and Jane Kelso Hasbrouck. He was baptized at the New Hurley Reformed Church in Shawangunk, New York.

William C. Hasbrouck graduated from Union College in Schenectady and lived for a time in Franklin, Tennessee, where he served as Principal of the academy founded by Bishop Otey. After returning to the North, he briefly worked as Principal of the Farmer's Hall Academy in Goshen in the early 1820s and then studied law with various lawyers in Newburgh, and was admitted to the bar in 1826.

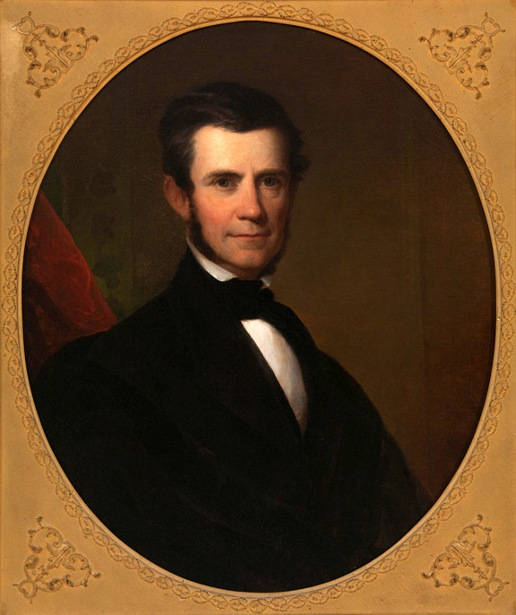
Circa 1843 portrait by Asher B. Durand

Hasbrouck was Trustee of Newburgh from 1835 to 1839, and lieutenant and later captain of a local militia at Newburgh called The Village Guard.

He was a Whig member from Orange County of the New York State Assembly, and was Speaker in 1847. In Newburgh, he practiced law with attorney James Taylor, operating under Hasbrouck & Taylor. They apprenticed many young men, including William Fullerton.

William Hasbrouck was a descendant of the Hasbroucks who founded New Paltz, located in New York's Hudson Valley, in 1678. The Hasbroucks were Huguenots, Protestant followers of John Calvin who fled what is today Northern France and South Belgium who fled persecution by the ruling Catholics. The original settlement of their ancestors survives today as Historic Huguenot Street, a National Historic Landmark District.

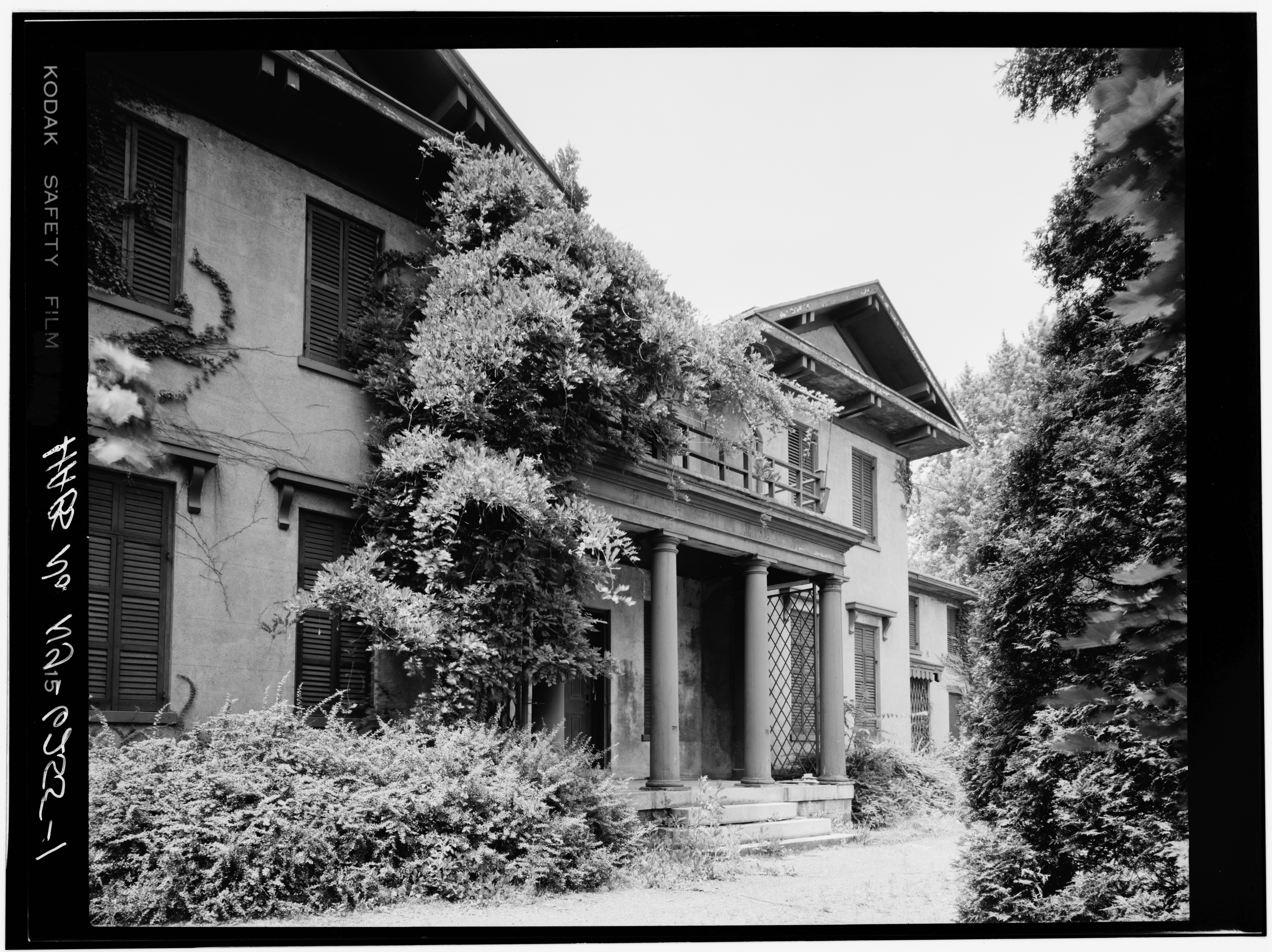
Hasbrouck's Tuscan villa in a state of disrepair

On June 28, 1831, William married Mary Elizabeth Roe, daughter of William Roe. William Roe, a retired grocer, gifted Hasbrouck the adjoining property to his mansion in Newburgh. A Tuscan-style villa was built. Between 1833 and 1853, William and Mary had nine children: William Hazard Hasbrouck, Maria Hazard Hasbrouck, Mary Roe Ann Hasbrouck, BG Henry Cornelius Hasbrouck, Emily Ann Hasbrouck, Mary Elizabeth Hasbrouck, Cornelia Jennette Hasbrouck, Blandina Hasbrouck, and Roe Hasbrouck.

Political offices
Preceded by William C. Crain	Speaker of the New York State Assembly; 1847	Succeeded by Amos K. Hadley
