= Alanson Skinner =

American politician (1794–1876)

Alanson Skinner (May 21, 1794 in Westmoreland, Cheshire County, New Hampshire – June 7, 1876 in Brownville, Jefferson County, New York) was an American manufacturer and politician from New York.

== Life ==
He was the son of Timothy Skinner and Ruth (Warner) Skinner. In 1814, he removed to Brownville, and later ran a foundry and stove works there. On September 29, 1819, he married Mary Woodward (1794–1851), and they had four children.

He was Supervisor of the Town of Brownville in 1839, 1840 and 1846; and President of the Village of Brownville in 1836. He was President of the National Union Bank of Watertown.

He was a member of the New York State Senate (5th D.) in 1850 and 1851. He was among the 12 state senators who resigned on April 17, 1851, to prevent a quorum in the Senate.

On November 4, 1852, he married Olevia Moffat (1794–1858). On September 23, 1862, he married Ermina Pheatt (1809–1881). He and his three wives were buried at the Brownville Cemetery.

State Senator Avery Skinner (1796–1876) was his brother.

== Sources ==
- The New York Civil List compiled by Franklin Benjamin Hough (pages 136 and 145; Weed, Parsons and Co., 1858)
- Skinner genealogy at Family Tree Maker
- Bio transcribed from Jefferson Co. History by L. H. Everts, at US Gen Net

New York State Senate
Preceded by John W. Tamblin	New York State Senate; 21st District; 1850–1851	Succeeded by Caleb Lyon
