= William Beach (American politician) =

American politician

William Beach (c. 1815 Auburn, Cayuga County, New York – March 14, 1860 Albany, New York) was an American politician from New York.

== Life ==
Beach was the son of Assemblyman John H. Beach (1783–1839), who came to Auburn from Connecticut in 1809 and established a sawmill, a gristmill, and a linseed oil mill. He graduated from Yale College in 1836, then studied law, but abandoned it after the death of his father. He engaged instead in the milling business in Port Byron, New York. Later he entered politics and returned to Auburn. He was a member of the New York State Senate (24th D.) from 1850 to 1853, sitting in the 73rd, 74th, 75th and 76th New York State Legislatures.

Beach died at the Delavan House in Albany, and was buried at the Fort Hill Cemetery in Auburn. His brother John C. Beach (d. 1856) was a law partner of William H. Seward.

== See also ==
- List of New York state senators

== Sources ==
- The New York Civil List compiled by Franklin Benjamin Hough (pages 136ff; Weed, Parsons and Co., 1858)
- Obituary Record of Graduates of Yale College (1870; pg. 11)
- The Cravath Firm and Its Predecessors by Robert T. Swaine (pg. 84f)
- Death notice in NYT on March 16, 1860

New York State Senate
Preceded by William J. Cornwell	New York State Senate; 24th District; 1850–1853	Succeeded by William Clark
