= Marius Schoonmaker =

American politician

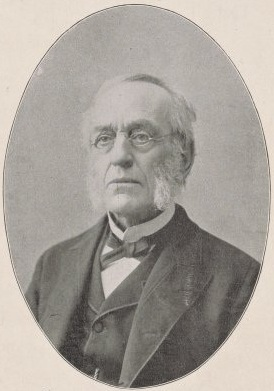
Marius Schoonmaker, Congressman from New York

Marius Schoonmaker (April 24, 1811 – January 5, 1894) was a United States representative from New York.

== Biography ==
Schoonmaker was born to Cornelia (née Groen) (1784–1874) and Zachariah Schoonmaker (1785–1818) in Kingston, Ulster County, New York. His father died when he was young, but he attended public schools and graduated from Yale College in 1830. He was admitted to the bar in 1833 and commenced practice in Kingston.

Schoonmaker was a member of the New York State Senate (10th D.) in 1850 and 1851, and was elected as a Whig to the Thirty-second Congress, holding office from March 4, 1851, to March 3, 1853. Afterwards he resumed the practice of law in Kingston.

Schoonmaker was Auditor of the New York State Canal Department from 1854 to 1855, and Superintendent of Banks from 1855 to 1856. He was also President of the Kingston Board of Education for nine years, and was President of the Village of Kingston in 1866, 1869 and 1870. In 1867, he was a delegate to the State Constitutional Convention of 1867–68.

On December 13, 1837, in Montrose, New York, he married Elizabeth Van Wyck Westbrook (1810–1887), daughter of Cornelius DePuy Westbrook (1782–1858) and his first wife, Hannah Van Wyck (1787–1817). She is a descendant of Louis DuBois. Their son, Captain Cornelius Marius Schoonmaker was a United States Naval Academy graduate who died in the 1889 Apia cyclone in American Samoa. He was born February 2, 1839, in Kingston and died on March 16, 1889.

Marius Street in Kingston is named after him and Elizabeth Street in Kingston is named after his wife.

Schoonmaker died in Kingston and was interred in Wiltwyck Rural Cemetery.

Congressman Cornelius C. Schoonmaker (1745–1796) was his grandfather.

New York State Senate
Preceded by Platt Adams	New York State Senate; 10th District; 1850–1851	Succeeded by George T. Pierce
U.S. House of Representatives
Preceded by Herman D. Gould	Member of the U.S. House of Representatives from New York's 10th congressional district 1851–1853	Succeeded by William Murray
