= Theodore Hutson Benedict =

American politician

Theodore Hutson Benedict (March 13, 1821 – June 14, 1885) was an American politician.

Benedict, second son of General James and Deborah (Coles) Benedict, was born in New York City, March 13, 1821. He was for more than two years of his Yale College course a member of the Class of 1839. His father's death in July, 1841, left him the master of large wealth, and enabled him to devote himself to foreign travel, to literary culture, and to the care of the family estate at Tarrytown, N. Y., where he resided through life, unmarried.

He entered politics as a Whig, and by his personal popularity overcame a Democratic majority in his district, and was elected to the New York State Legislature in 1850. In 1851 he declined, on account of the condition of his health, a nomination to the New York State Senate; and in 1852 he was a member of the convention which nominated General Winfield Scott for the US Presidency. Later, his delicate health prevented him from active participation in politics.

He died in Tarrytown, June 14, 1885, in his 65th year.

New York State Assembly
Preceded by Jesse Lyon	New York State Assembly; Westchester County, 2nd District; 1851	Succeeded by Abraham Hatfield
