= John Fine (politician) =

American politician (1794–1867)

Member of the New York Senate from the 15th district
- In office 1848–1849
- Preceded by: new district
- Succeeded by: William A. Dart

Member of the U.S. House of Representatives from New York's 14th congressional district
- In office March 4, 1839 – March 3, 1841
- Preceded by: James B. Spencer
- Succeeded by: Henry Bell Van Rensselaer

Personal details
- Born: August 26, 1794 New York City, Manhattan, New York, U.S.
- Died: January 4, 1867 (aged 72) Ogdensburg, St. Lawrence County, New York, U.S.
- Resting place: Ogdensburg Cemetery
- Party: Democratic
- Education: Columbia College; Litchfield Law School

John Fine (August 26, 1794 – January 4, 1867) was a judge and politician in New York. As a state senator, he led the passage of New York's Married Women's Property Act in 1848. In addition to two terms in the New York State Senate, he served one term in Congress as a U.S. Representative from New York from 1839 to 1841.

== Biography ==
Born in New York City, Fine received private instruction. He was graduated from Columbia College at New York City in 1809. He studied law in the Litchfield (Connecticut) Law School. He was admitted to the bar in 1815 and commenced practice in Ogdensburg, St. Lawrence County, New York. Treasurer of St. Lawrence County 1821–1833.

He served as judge of the court of common pleas for St. Lawrence County from 1824 until his resignation in March 1839.

=== Congress ===
Fine was elected as a Democrat to the Twenty-sixth Congress (March 4, 1839 – March 3, 1841). He served as again judge of the court of common pleas from February 16, 1843, until the court was abolished in 1847. He was an unsuccessful candidate for judge of the State supreme court in 1847 and again in 1849.

=== State Senate ===
After losing the judicial election, Fine ran for a seat in the New York State Senate and won. He served two terms, representing the 15th District, which covered northern St. Lawrence and Franklin Counties.

Fine's most significant legislation in the State Senate was his introduction of the Married Women's Property Act. The Act was first introduced in 1836 by Judge Thomas Herttell. Members of the nascent women's rights movement in New York lobbied for the bill, most notably Ernestine Rose and Paulina Wright Davis, but it was blocked by the legislature for the next twelve years. In 1847, Fine published a pamphlet calling for women's right to keep their own property after marriage, and reintroduced the bill in the legislature. It passed the Senate by a vote of 28-1, a similarly large margin, and was signed into law on April 7, 1848.

Fine was reelected for another term in 1849. He later resumed the practice of law. He died in Ogdensburg, New York, January 4, 1867. He was interred in Ogdensburg Cemetery. A historical marker in Ogdensburg notes his service.

U.S. House of Representatives
Preceded by James B. Spencer	Member of the U.S. House of Representatives from New York's 14th congressional district 1839–1841	Succeeded by Henry Bell Van Rensselaer
New York State Senate
Preceded by new district	New York State Senate; 15th District; 1848–1849	Succeeded by William A. Dart
