= Valentine Treadwell =

American politician

Valentine Treadwell (c. 1813 – September 1, 1888 Potter's Hollow, Albany County, New York) was an American farmer and politician from New York.

== Life ==
He was the son of Stephen Treadwell, a Quaker minister who removed to Potter's Hollow in 1816.

He was Supervisor of the Town of Rensselaerville in 1845 an 1846.

He was a Whig/Anti-Rent member of the New York State Assembly (Albany Co.) in 1847.

He was a member of the New York State Senate (11th D.) in 1848 and 1849.

He was Postmaster of Potter's Hollow for about 25 years.

In 1883, he was nominated on the Citizen's Association ticket in Albany County for Justice of Sessions. At the time of his death, he was a Justice of the Peace.

== Sources ==
- The New York Civil List compiled by Franklin Benjamin Hough (pages 136, 146, 233 and 311; Weed, Parsons and Co., 1858)
- Manual for the Use of the Legislature (1870; pg. 150, "Post-Offices and Postmasters")
- THE STATE CAMPAIGN in NYT on October 11, 1883
- Obit from NYT (issue of September 2, 1888) transcribed at Gen Forum

New York State Senate
Preceded by new district	New York State Senate; 11th District; 1848–1849	Succeeded by Stephen H. Johnson
