= Alexander J. Coffin =

American politician

- Born: December 16, 1794; Poughkeepsie, Dutchess County, New York
- Died: April 23, 1868 (aged 73)
- Notable work: a member of the New York State Senate

Alexander J. Coffin (December 16, 1794 – April 23, 1868 Poughkeepsie, Dutchess County, New York) was an American politician from New York.

== Life ==
He was the son of Eliab Coffin (c. 1756–1841) and Mary (Jenkins) Coffin (b. 1761). On April 8, 1819, he married Lydia Stratton (1798–1832), and they had three children.

He was a presidential elector in 1824.

He was a member of the New York State Senate (8th D.) in 1848 and 1849.

He was buried at the Friends Ground in Poughkeepsie.

== Sources ==
- The New York Civil List compiled by Franklin Benjamin Hough (pages 136, 139 and 326; Weed, Parsons and Co., 1858)
- Coffin genealogy at Nantucket Historical Association

New York State Senate
Preceded by new district	New York State Senate; 8th District; 1848–1849	Succeeded by John Snyder
