= Frederick P. Bellinger =

American politician

Frederick P. Bellinger (March 15, 1792 – February 13, 1876) was an American farmer and politician from New York.

== Life ==
He was the son of Capt. Peter F. Bellinger (1759–1815) and Elizabeth (Harter) Bellinger (1764–1823). He married Mary Barbara Weaver (1798–1874), and they had six children.

He was a member of the New York State Assembly in 1827 and 1830 (Herkimer Co.); and in 1849 (Herkimer Co., 1st D.).

He was a member of the New York State Senate (16th D.) in 1856 and 1857.

He was buried at the Oak Hill Cemetery in Herkimer, New York.

== Sources ==
- The New York Civil List compiled by Franklin Benjamin Hough (pages 137f, 205, 209, 236 and 258; Weed, Parsons and Co., 1858)
- Pen and Ink Portraits of the Senators, Assemblymen, and State Officers of New York by G. W. Bungay (1857; pg. 10)
- Early Families of Herkimer County (pg. 30)

New York State Assembly
Preceded by James Feeter	New York State Assembly; Herkimer County, 1st District; 1849	Succeeded by Asa Vickery
New York State Senate
Preceded by George Yost	New York State Senate; 16th District; 1856–1857	Succeeded by Ralph A. Loveland
