= William Henry Bogart =

American politician (1810–1888)

William Henry Bogart (1810 in Albany, New York – 1888 in Aurora, Cayuga County, New York), was a lawyer, legislator, journalist, historian and one of the first trustees of Wells College.

== Political Office ==
In 1840, Mr. Bogart was elected to the New York State Assembly to represent Tompkins County; he served one term. Additionally he was a clerk for the New York State Senate.

== Writings ==
Mr. Bogart was a correspondent for New York Courier and Enquirer and the New York World newspapers, but he was also an historian and author. He most well known for his book on Daniel Boone, Daniel Boone and the Hunters of Kentucky (1854), which Bogart wrote in an attempt to rescue Daniel Boone from becoming entirely myth and legend. Bogart also wrote poetry and books on more general American history.
