= Noble S. Elderkin =

American politician

Noble Strong Elderkin (August 28, 1810 in Potsdam, St. Lawrence County, New York – December 29, 1875 in Potsdam, St. Lawrence County, New York) was an American politician from New York. He was Speaker of the New York State Assembly in 1850.

== Life ==
He was the son of Anthony Y. Elderkin, a wheelwright (c. 1785 in Willimantic, Connecticut – 19 May 1850 in Madrid, New York) and Parmela Fuller Elderkin. His parents married in 1807 at Middlebury, Vermont. Their first child Elmira L. Elderkin (1807–1880) was born there. In 1808, the family removed to Potsdam, New York, where Noble and his other siblings were born.

He was Sheriff of St. Lawrence County, New York from 1843 to 1846.

He was a Democratic member from St. Lawrence County of the New York State Assembly from 1849 to 1851. In 1850, Democrats and Whigs had a tie vote in the Assembly, but it having become apparent to Robert H. Pruyn, the Whig candidate for Speaker, that one of the Whig members could not properly hold his seat, Pruyn abstained from voting, and Elderkin was chosen Speaker. The appreciation of this high-minded course was shown shortly afterward: The Speaker was called home when his wife Eliza was very ill, and the Democrats voted for Pruyn to become the new Speaker. Shortly thereafter, both Elderkin's wife and father died, his wife at Potsdam, N.Y., on April 8, aged 38 years, his father on May 19 at neighboring Madrid, N.Y., and Elderkin did not return to the Assembly for the remainder of this session.

He was President of the village of Potsdam from 1857 until 1858.

In 1859, he ran on the Democratic and American tickets for New York State Prison Inspector but was narrowly defeated by Republican David P. Forrest.

== Sources ==
- Elderkin genealogy at Genforum
- His wife's death notice
- Potsdam History
- Mention in Census 1870
- Noble and Eliza mentioned in birth records 1847
- Bio of Robert H. Pruyn at Schenectady History
- Google Books The New York Civil List compiled by Franklin Benjamin Hough (pages 272 and 406; Weed, Parsons and Co., 1858)

New York State Assembly
Preceded by Benjamin Holmes	New York State Assembly; St. Lawrence County, 3rd District; 1849–1851	Succeeded by Parker W. Rose
Political offices
Preceded by Amos K. Hadley	Speaker of the New York State Assembly; 1850	Succeeded by Robert H. Pruyn
