= List of speakers of the New York State Assembly =

Speaker of the New York State Assembly
- Seal of New York

- Flag of New York

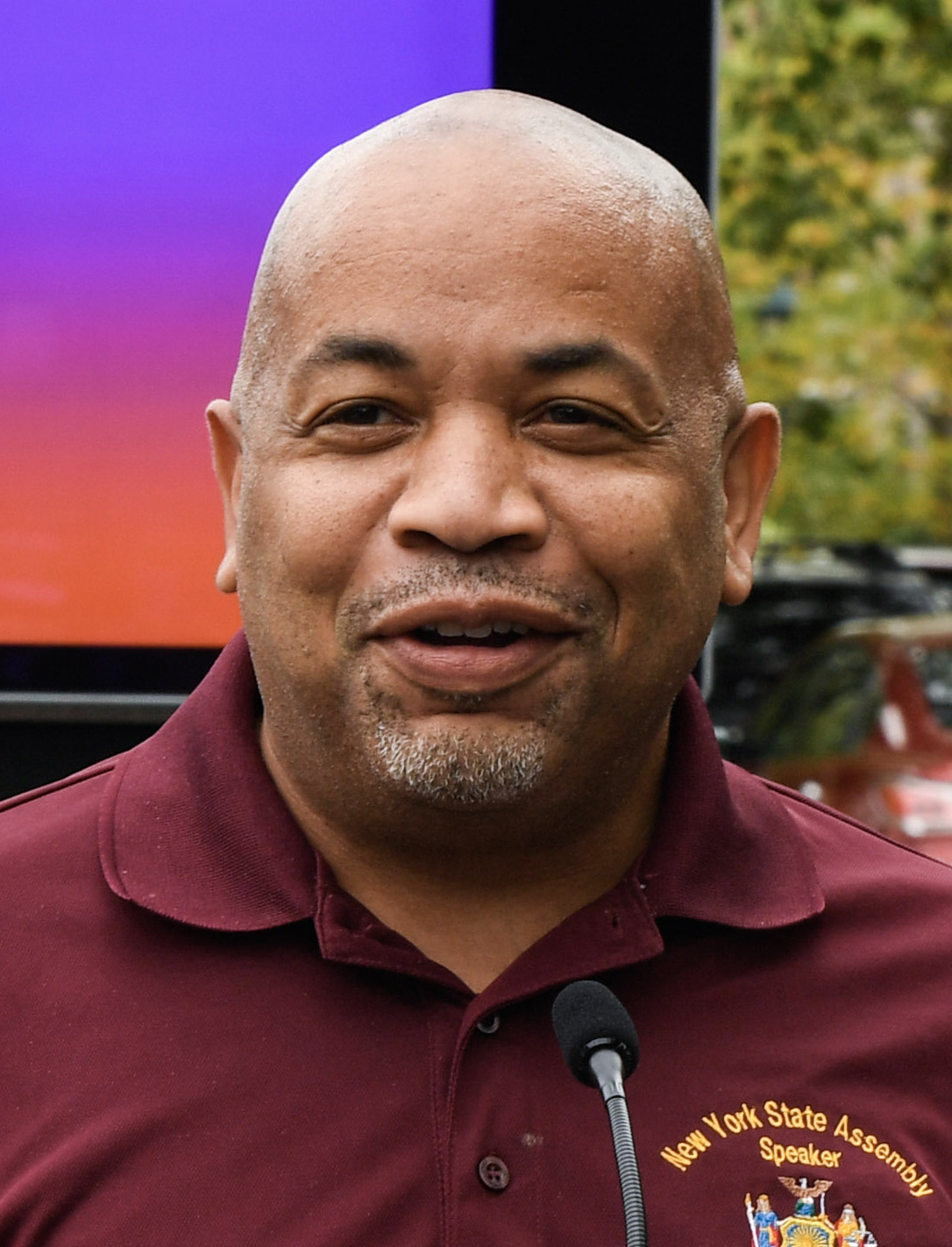
- Incumbent; Carl Heastie since February 3, 2015
- Style: The Honorable (diplomatic); Mr. Speaker (within the assembly)
- Inaugural holder: Walter Livingston; September 10, 1777
- Formation: New York State Constitution
- Succession: Third
- Salary: $183,500 (2023)

The Speaker of the New York State Assembly is the highest official in the New York State Assembly, customarily elected from the ranks of the majority party.

As in most countries with a British heritage, the Speaker presides over the lower house of the legislature. The position exists in every U.S. state and in the United States House of Representatives, the lower house of the Congress. New York's Assembly Speaker has the power to control much of the business in the Assembly and, in fact, throughout all of state government. Through their control of the chamber, the Assembly Speaker is able to dictate what legislation makes and does not make it to the floor.

== Selection ==
The Assembly elects its Speaker at the beginning of a new term following the state elections, or after a vacancy in the office has occurred. The Clerk of the Assembly from the previous year will convene the Assembly and preside over the election process. Traditionally, each party caucus nominates a member from among their senior leadership. To be elected Speaker a member must receive a majority of votes cast.

== List of Speakers ==
=== Note ===
Originally, the legislative term lasted one year, from July 1 until June 30 of the next year. The members were elected at the state election in April, but the actual session began ordinarily only in January of the next calendar year, which leads occasionally to some confusion. Only if the governor called for a special session is the Assembly convened earlier. For example, in presidential election years the Assembly convened already in November to elect the presidential electors. The Speaker was always elected at the first meeting of the Assembly for the remainder of the term, expiring on June 30.

The State Constitution of 1821 moved the election to November, and the beginning of the term to January 1, and from 1823 on, the legislative term coincides with the calendar year. The assembly convened usually on the first Tuesday in January and elected the Speaker, who stayed in office until December 31.

An amendment to the State Constitution, adopted in November 1937, extended the assemblymen's term to two years, beginning with the electees of November 1938 who served the first two-year term in 1939–40. The elections are held in even-numbered years.

=== From 1777 to 1822 ===
- (1st Session, convened at Kingston and Poughkeepsie) September 10, 1777 – June 30, 1778 Walter Livingston from Albany County
- (2nd S., at Poughkeepsie) October 13, 1778 – June 30, 1779 Walter Livingston from Albany County
- (3rd S., at Kingston and Albany) August 18, 1779 – July 2, 1780 Evert Bancker from New York County
- (4th S., at Poughkeepsie and Albany) September 7, 1780 – July 1, 1781 Evert Bancker from New York County
- (5th S., at Poughkeepsie) October 24, 1781 – June 30, 1782 Evert Bancker from New York County
- (6th S., at Poughkeepsie and Kingston) July 11, 1782 – June 30, 1783 Evert Bancker from New York County
- (7th S.) January 21 – June 30, 1784 John Hathorn from Orange County
- (8th S., at New York City) October 12, 1784 – June 30, 1785 David Gelston from Suffolk County
- (9th S., at New York City) January 12 – June 30, 1786 John Lansing Jr. from Albany County
- (10th S., at New York City) January 12 – June 30, 1787 Richard Varick from New York County
- (11th S., at Poughkeepsie) January 9 – June 30, 1788 Richard Varick from New York County
- (12th S., at Albany) December 11, 1788 – June 30, 1789 John Lansing Jr. from Albany County
- (13th S., at Albany and New York City) July 6, 1789 – June 30, 1790 Gulian Verplanck (Fed.) from New York County
- (14th S., at New York City) January 5 – June 30, 1791 John Watts from New York County
- (15th S., at New York City) January 4 – June 30, 1792 John Watts from New York County
- (16th S., at New York City) November 6, 1792 – June 30, 1793 John Watts from New York County
- (17th S., at Albany) January 7 – June 30, 1794 James Watson, (Fed.) from New York County
- (18th S., at Poughkeepsie and New York City) January 6 – June 30, 1795 William North (Fed.) of Albany County
- (19th S., at New York City) January 6 – June 30, 1796 William North (Fed.) of Albany County
- (20th S., at New York City and Albany) November 1, 1796 – June 30, 1797 Gulian Verplanck (Fed.) from New York
- (21st S.) January 2 – June 30, 1798 Dirck Ten Broeck (Fed.) of Albany County
- (22nd S.) August 9, 1798 – June 30, 1799 Dirck Ten Broeck (Fed.) of Albany County
- (23rd S.) January 28 – June 30, 1800 Dirck Ten Broeck (Fed.) of Albany County
- (24th S.) November 4, 1800 – June 30, 1801 Samuel Osgood, from New York County
- (25th S.) January 26 – June 30, 1802 Thomas Storm from New York County
- (26th S.) January 25 – June 30, 1803 Thomas Storm from New York County
- (27th S.) January 31 – June 30, 1804 Alexander Sheldon from Montgomery County
- (28th S.) November 6, 1804 – June 30, 1805 Alexander Sheldon from Montgomery County
- (29th S.) January 28 – June 30, 1806 Alexander Sheldon (Clintonian) from Montgomery County
- (30th S.) January 27 – June 30, 1807 Andrew McCord (Lewisite) from Orange County
- (31st S.) January 26 – June 30, 1808 Alexander Sheldon from Montgomery County
- (32nd S.) November 1, 1808 – June 30, 1809 James W. Wilkin from Orange County
- (33rd S.) January 30 – June 30, 1810 William North from Schenectady County
- (34th S., part) January 29 – February 12, 1811 Nathan Sanford from New York County (failed to attend session because of illness)
- (34th S., part) February 12 – June 30, 1811 William Ross (Dem.-Rep.) from Orange County
- (35th S.) January 28 – June 30, 1812 Alexander Sheldon, from Montgomery County
- (36th S.) November 3, 1812 – June 30, 1813 Jacob R. Van Rensselaer (Fed.), from Columbia County
- (37th S.) January 25 – June 30, 1814 James Emott (Fed.) from Dutchess County
- (38th S.) September 26, 1814 – June 30, 1815 Samuel Young from Saratoga County
- (39th S.) January 31 – June 30, 1816 Daniel Cruger from Steuben County
- (40th S.) November 5, 1816 – June 30, 1817 David Woods from Washington County
- (41st S.) January 27 – June 30, 1818 David Woods from Madison County
- (42nd S.) January 6 – June 30, 1819 Obadiah German from Chenango County
- (43rd S.) January 4 – June 30, 1820 John Canfield Spencer (Dem.-Rep./Clintonian) from Ontario County
- (44th S.) November 7, 1820 – June 30, 1821 Peter Sharpe (Dem.-Rep./Tammany Hall) from New York County
- (45th S.) January 3 – December 31, 1822 Samuel B. Romaine (Dem.-Rep./Tammany Hall) from New York County (The assemblymen of this session were elected in April 1821 under the provisions of the State Constitution of 1777 for a term beginning on July 1, 1821, and expiring on June 30, 1822. The State Constitution of 1821, ratified by the voters in February 1822, provided for their remaining in office until December 31, 1822, although the Assembly did not meet again after the usual adjournment in May. The next session's members were elected in November 1822 for a term beginning on January 1, 1823.)

=== Since 1823 ===
Speakers since 1823 are:

Speaker	Party	County	Took office	Left office	Notes
Peter R. Livingston	Dem.-Rep./Bucktails	Dutchess	January 7, 1823	December 31, 1823	
Richard Goodell	Dem.-Rep./Bucktails	Jefferson	January 6, 1824	December 31, 1824	
Clarkson Crolius	Dem.-Rep./ Tammany Hall	New York	January 4, 1825	December 31, 1825	
Samuel Young	Dem.-Rep./Bucktails	Saratoga	January 3, 1826	December 31, 1826	
Erastus Root	Dem.-Rep./Bucktails	Delaware	January 2, 1827	December 31, 1828	two terms
Peter Robinson	Dem./Jacksonian	Broome	January 6, 1829	December 31, 1829	
Erastus Root	Dem./Jacksonian	Delaware	January 5, 1830	December 31, 1830	third term
George R. Davis	Democratic	Rensselaer	January 4, 1831	December 31, 1831	
Charles L. Livingston	Democratic	New York	January 3, 1832	December 31, 1833	two terms
William Baker	Democratic	Otsego	January 7, 1834	December 31, 1834	
Charles Humphrey	Democratic	Tompkins	January 6, 1835	December 31, 1836	two terms
Edward Livingston	Democratic	Suffolk	January 3, 1837	December 31, 1837	
Luther Bradish	Whig	Franklin	January 2, 1838	December 31, 1838	
George W. Patterson	Whig	Livingston	January 1, 1839	December 31, 1840	two terms
Peter B. Porter Jr.	Whig	Niagara	January 5, 1841	December 31, 1841	
Levi S. Chatfield	Democratic	Otsego	January 4, 1842	December 31, 1842	
George R. Davis	Democratic	Rensselaer	January 3, 1843	December 31, 1843	second term
Elisha Litchfield	Democratic	Onondaga	January 2, 1844	December 31, 1844	
Horatio Seymour	Democratic	Oneida	January 7, 1845	December 31, 1845	
William C. Crain	Democratic	Herkimer	January 6, 1846	December 31, 1846	
William C. Hasbrouck	Whig	Orange	January 5, 1847	December 31, 1847	
Amos K. Hadley	Whig	Rensselaer	January 4, 1848	December 31, 1849	two terms
Noble S. Elderkin	Democratic	St. Lawrence	January 1, 1850	January 30, 1850	left the Assembly to return home to his sick wife
Robert H. Pruyn	Whig	Albany	January 30, 1850	March 14, 1850	elected when Elderkin left the Assembly
Ferral C. Dininny	Democratic	Steuben	March 14, 1850	December 31, 1850	
Henry Jarvis Raymond	Whig	New York	January 7, 1851	June 10, 1851	
Joseph B. Varnum Jr.	Whig	Albany	June 10, 1851	December 31, 1851	elected when Raymond failed to attend special session
Jonas C. Heartt	Whig	Rensselaer	January 6, 1852	December 31, 1852	
William H. Ludlow	Democratic	Suffolk	January 4, 1853	December 31, 1853	
Robert H. Pruyn	Whig	Albany	January 3, 1854	December 31, 1854	second term
DeWitt C. Littlejohn	Whig	Oswego	January 2, 1855	December 31, 1855	
Orville Robinson	Democratic	Oswego	January 16, 1856	December 31, 1856	The Assembly convened on January 1, but it took more than two weeks to elect a Speaker.
DeWitt C. Littlejohn	Republican	Oswego	January 6, 1857	December 31, 1857	second term
Thomas G. Alvord	Democratic	Onondaga	January 26, 1858	December 31, 1858	
DeWitt C. Littlejohn	Republican	Oswego	January, 1859	December 31, 1861	three terms (third, fourth and fifth)
Henry J. Raymond	Republican	New York	January, 1862	December 31, 1862	second term
Theophilus C. Callicot	Democratic	Kings	January 26, 1863	December 31, 1863	elected by the Republicans in a split assembly
Thomas G. Alvord	Republican	Onondaga	January, 1864	December 31, 1864	second term
George G. Hoskins	Republican	Wyoming	January, 1865	December 31, 1865	
Lyman Tremain	Republican	Albany	January, 1866	December 31, 1866	
Edmund L. Pitts	Republican	Orleans	January, 1867	December 31, 1867	
William Hitchman	Democratic	New York	January, 1868	December 31, 1868	
Truman G. Younglove	Republican	Saratoga	January, 1869	December 31, 1869	
William Hitchman	Democratic	New York	January, 1870	December 31, 1871	two terms (second and third)
Henry Smith	Republican	Albany	January, 1872	December 31, 1872	
Alonzo B. Cornell	Republican	New York	January, 1873	December 31, 1873	
James W. Husted	Republican	Westchester	January, 1874	December 31, 1874	
Jeremiah McGuire	Democratic	Chemung	January, 1875	December 31, 1875	
James W. Husted	Republican	Westchester	January, 1876	December 31, 1876	second term
George B. Sloan	Republican	Oswego	January, 1877	December 31, 1877	
James W. Husted	Republican	Westchester	January, 1878	December 31, 1878	third term
Thomas G. Alvord	Republican	Onondaga	January, 1879	December 31, 1879	third term
George H. Sharpe	Republican	Ulster	January, 1880	December 31, 1881	two terms
Charles E. Patterson	Democratic	Rensselaer	February 2, 1882	December 31, 1882	
Alfred C. Chapin	Democratic	Kings	January, 1883	December 31, 1883	
Titus Sheard	Republican	Herkimer	January, 1884	December 31, 1884	
George Z. Erwin	Republican	St. Lawrence	January, 1885	December 31, 1885	
James W. Husted	Republican	Westchester	January, 1886	December 31, 1887	two terms (fourth and fifth)
Fremont Cole	Republican	Schuyler	January, 1888	December 31, 1889	two terms
James W. Husted	Republican	Westchester	January, 1890	December 31, 1890	sixth term
William F. Sheehan	Democratic	Erie	January, 1891	December 31, 1891	
Robert P. Bush	Democratic	Chemung	January 5, 1892	December 31, 1892	
William Sulzer	Democratic	New York	January, 1893	December 31, 1893	
George R. Malby	Republican	St. Lawrence	January, 1894	December 31, 1894	
Hamilton Fish II	Republican	Putnam	January, 1895	December 31, 1896	two terms
James M. E. O'Grady	Republican	Monroe	January 5, 1897	December 31, 1898	two terms
S. Frederick Nixon	Republican	Chautauqua	January, 1899	October 10, 1905	died in office during his seventh term
James W. Wadsworth Jr.	Republican	Livingston	January, 1906	December 31, 1910	five terms
Daniel D. Frisbie	Democratic	Schoharie	January 4, 1911	December 31, 1911	
Edwin A. Merritt Jr.	Republican	St. Lawrence	January 3, 1912	November 5, 1912	resigned to take his seat in Congress
Alfred E. Smith	Democratic	New York	January, 1913	December 31, 1913	
Thaddeus C. Sweet	Republican	Oswego	January 7, 1914	December 31, 1920	seven terms
H. Edmund Machold	Republican	Jefferson	January 5, 1921	December 31, 1924	four terms
Joseph A. McGinnies	Republican	Chautauqua	January 7, 1925	December 31, 1934	ten terms
Irwin Steingut	Democratic	Kings	January 2, 1935	December 31, 1935	father of Speaker Stanley Steingut
Irving M. Ives	Republican	Chenango	January 1, 1936	December 31, 1936	
Oswald D. Heck	Republican	Schenectady	January 13, 1937	May 21, 1959	longest serving Speaker (22 years and 4 months), died in office during his thirteenth term
Joseph Carlino	Republican	Nassau	May 21, 1959	December 31, 1964	as Majority Leader became Acting Speaker upon the death of Oswald D. Heck, elected Speaker on July 1 for the remainder of the term, then re-elected to another two terms
Anthony J. Travia	Democratic	Kings	February 4, 1965	July 22, 1968	vacated his seat during his second term upon appointment as a federal judge
Moses M. Weinstein	Democratic	Queens	July 23, 1968	December 31, 1968	as Majority Leader became Acting Speaker upon Travia's resignation for the remainder of the term
Perry B. Duryea Jr.	Republican	Suffolk	January 8, 1969	December 31, 1974	three terms, last Republican Speaker to date
Stanley Steingut	Democratic	Kings	January 8, 1975	December 31, 1978	two terms, son of Speaker Irwin Steingut
Stanley Fink	Democratic	Kings	January 2, 1979	December 31, 1986	four terms
Mel Miller	Democratic	Kings	January 8, 1987	December 13, 1991	removed from office upon federal conviction in the middle of his third term
James R. Tallon Jr.	Democratic	Broome	December 13, 1991	December 16, 1991	as Majority Leader became Acting Speaker upon Miller's removal from office until the election of a successor
Saul Weprin	Democratic	Queens	December 16, 1991	February 11, 1994	elected for the remainder of Miller's term, then re-elected to another term, died in office
Sheldon Silver	Democratic	New York	February 11, 1994	February 2, 2015	elected Interim Speaker on January 24, 1994, after Weprin's incapacitation; elected Speaker for the remainder of the term after Weprin's death, and re-elected eleven times; announced resignation to take effect one minute before midnight on February 2, 2015, after conviction; Second longest serving assembly speaker in New York history
Joseph D. Morelle	Democratic	Monroe	February 3, 2015	February 3, 2015	as Majority Leader became Acting Speaker upon Silver's resignation. Served for less than 12 hours.
Carl Heastie	Democratic	Bronx	February 3, 2015	present	

== See also ==
- List of Speakers of the New York General Assembly during the colonial period, 1683-1775.
- List of New York State legislatures
