= 65th New York State Legislature =

New York state legislative session

←	64th	66th	→
- The Old State Capitol (1879)

Overview
- Legislative body: New York State Legislature
- Jurisdiction: New York, United States
- Term: January 1 – December 31, 1842

Senate
- Members: 32
- President: Lt. Gov. Luther Bradish (W)
- Party control: Democratic (17-15)

Assembly
- Members: 128
- Speaker: Levi S. Chatfield (D)
- Party control: Democratic (95-33)

Sessions
- 1st: January 4 – April 12, 1842
- 2nd: August 16 – September 7, 1842

The 65th New York State Legislature, consisting of the New York State Senate and the New York State Assembly, met from January 4 to September 7, 1842, during the fourth year of William H. Seward's governorship, in Albany.

== Background ==
Under the provisions of the New York Constitution of 1821, 32 Senators were elected on general tickets in eight senatorial districts for four-year terms. They were divided into four classes, and every year eight Senate seats came up for election. Assemblymen were elected countywide on general tickets to a one-year term, the whole Assembly being renewed annually.

State Senator Minthorne Tompkins resigned on March 8, 1841; and State Senator Mark H. Sibley resigned on May 28, 1841; leaving vacancies in the First and Seventh District.

Secretary of State John C. Spencer (W) resigned on October 11, 1841, to take office as U.S. Secretary of War.

At this time there were two political parties: the Democratic Party and the Whig Party.

In New York City, the "friends of civil and religious freedom, in favor of extending the benefits of a common school education to the neglected and indigent children of this city" met on October 26, 1841, at Carroll Hall, and nominated a ticket for the Senate and Assembly elections. The Carroll Hall assembly ticket was made up of 10 of the 13 Tammany Hall (Democratic) nominees and three own candidates. The spoiler effect led to the election of one Whig and one Democrat to the Senate, and of 10 Democrats and 3 Whigs to the Assembly.

== Elections ==
The State election was held from November 1 to 3, 1841.

State Senator Henry A. Livingston (2nd D.) was defeated for re-election.

1841 New York State Senate election result
District	Democrat		Whig		Carroll Hall	
First	Isaac L. Varian	19,811	Morris Franklin	19,675	Thomas O'Connor	2,581
First	Elijah F. Purdy	19,523	Daniel Lord Jr.	19,584	John George Gottsberger	2,423
Second	Abraham Bockee	23,377	Henry A. Livingston	17,194		
Third	Erastus Corning	26,268	Killian Miller	22,008		
Fourth	Edmund Varney	25,721	David Abel Russell	23,306		
Fifth	William Ruger	25,738	Roswell T. Lee	20,934		
Sixth	James Faulkner	25,450	Allen Ayrault	23,788		
Seventh	William Bartlit	25,017	Henry Welles	23,734		
Seventh	Lyman Sherwood	25,010	Barak Niles	23,723		
Eighth	Lyman Bates	16,861	Gideon Hard	20,907		

== Sessions ==
The Legislature met for the regular session at the Old State Capitol in Albany on January 4, 1842; and adjourned on April 12.

Levi S. Chatfield (D) was elected Speaker with 93 votes against 32 for George A. Simmons (W). John O. Cole (D) was elected Clerk of the Assembly with 91 votes against 33 for the incumbent Philander B. Prindle (W).

On January 12, John L. O'Sullivan (D) brought a bill in the Assembly to abolish capital punishment, which was rejected on March 31 by a vote of 45 to 54.

On February 7, the Legislature elected Samuel Young (D) to fill the vacancy in the office of Secretary of State; Azariah C. Flagg (D) to succeed John A. Collier (W) as State Comptroller; Thomas Farrington (D) to succeed Jacob Haight (W) as State Treasurer; George P. Barker (D) to succeed Willis Hall (W) as Attorney General; and Nathaniel Jones (D) to succeed Orville L. Holley as Surveyor General.

On February 8, the Legislature elected Daniel P. Bissell, Stephen Clark, Jonas Earll, Jr., Benjamin Enos, James Hooker and George W. Little to succeed George H. Boughton, Simon Newton Dexter, Henry Hamilton, David Hudson, Samuel B. Ruggles and Asa Whitney as Canal Commissioners.

On April 5, the Legislature enacted that future state elections be held on a single day, fixing the date on the Tuesday next after the first Monday in November.

The Legislature met for a special session on August 16; and adjourned on September 7. This session was called to re-apportion the congressional districts. Earlier this year Congress had passed a law requiring all representatives in all States to be elected in single districts, and in New York there had been for decades several multiple-seat districts.

On September 7, the Democratic state convention met at Syracuse, and nominated again William C. Bouck for Governor, and Daniel S. Dickinson for Lieutenant Governor.

On the same day, the Whig state convention met; Charles H. Carroll was Chairman. They nominated Lt. Gov. Luther Bradish for Governor, and State Senator Gabriel Furman for Lieutenant Governor.

== State Senate ==
=== Districts ===
- The First District (4 seats) consisted of Kings, New York and Richmond counties.
- The Second District (4 seats) consisted of Dutchess, Orange, Putnam, Queens, Rockland, Suffolk, Sullivan, Ulster and Westchester counties.
- The Third District (4 seats) consisted of Albany, Columbia, Delaware, Greene, Rensselaer, Schenectady and Schoharie counties.
- The Fourth District (4 seats) consisted of Clinton, Essex, Franklin, Fulton, Hamilton, Herkimer, Montgomery, St. Lawrence, Saratoga, Warren and Washington counties.
- The Fifth District (4 seats) consisted of Jefferson, Lewis, Madison, Oneida, Oswego and Otsego counties.
- The Sixth District (4 seats) consisted of Allegany, Broome, Cattaraugus, Chemung, Chenango, Livingston, Steuben, Tioga and Tompkins counties.
- The Seventh District (4 seats) consisted of Cayuga, Cortland, Onondaga, Ontario, Seneca, Wayne and Yates counties.
- The Eighth District (4 seats) consisted of Chautauqua, Erie, Genesee, Monroe, Niagara, Orleans and Wyoming counties.
Note: There are now 62 counties in the State of New York. The counties which are not mentioned in this list had not yet been established, or sufficiently organized, the area being included in one or more of the abovementioned counties.

=== Members ===
The asterisk (*) denotes members of the previous Legislature who continued in office as members of this Legislature.

District	Senators	Term left	Party	Notes
First	Gabriel Furman*	1 year	Whig	
First	Morris Franklin	2 years	Whig	elected to fill vacancy, in place of Minthorne Tompkins
First	John B. Scott*	3 years	Democrat	
First	Isaac L. Varian	4 years	Democrat	
Second	Daniel Johnson*	1 year	Democrat	
Second	John Hunter*	2 years	Democrat	
Second	Robert Denniston*	3 years	Democrat	
Second	Abraham Bockee	4 years	Democrat	
Third	Alonzo C. Paige*	1 year	Democrat	
Third	Erastus Root*	2 years	Whig	
Third	Henry W. Strong*	3 years	Democrat	also Recorder of Troy
Third	Erastus Corning	4 years	Democrat	
Fourth	Bethuel Peck*	1 year	Whig	
Fourth	James G. Hopkins*	2 years	Whig	
Fourth	John W. Taylor*	3 years	Whig	resigned on August 19, 1842
Fourth	Edmund Varney	4 years	Democrat	
Fifth	Joseph Clark*	1 year	Democrat	
Fifth	Sumner Ely*	2 years	Democrat	
Fifth	Henry A. Foster*	3 years	Democrat	
Fifth	William Ruger	4 years	Democrat	
Sixth	Alvah Hunt*	1 year	Whig	
Sixth	Andrew B. Dickinson*	2 years	Whig	
Sixth	Nehemiah Platt*	3 years	Whig	
Sixth	James Faulkner	4 years	Democrat	
Seventh	Robert C. Nicholas*	1 year	Whig	
Seventh	Lyman Sherwood	2 years	Democrat	elected to fill vacancy, in place of Mark H. Sibley
Seventh	Elijah Rhoades*	3 years	Whig	
Seventh	William Bartlit	4 years	Democrat	
Eighth	Henry Hawkins*	1 year	Whig	
Eighth	Abram Dixon*	2 years	Whig	
Eighth	Samuel Works*	3 years	Whig	
Eighth	Gideon Hard	4 years	Whig	

=== Employees ===
- Clerk: Isaac R. Elwood

== State Assembly ==
=== Districts ===
- Albany County (3 seats)
- Allegany County (2 seats)
- Broome County (1 seat)
- Cattaraugus County (2 seats)
- Cayuga County (3 seats)
- Chautauqua County (3 seats)
- Chemung County (1 seat)
- Chenango County (3 seats)
- Clinton County (1 seat)
- Columbia County (3 seats)
- Cortland County (2 seats)
- Delaware County (2 seats)
- Dutchess County (3 seats)
- Erie County (3 seats)
- Essex County (1 seat)
- Franklin County (1 seat)
- Fulton and Hamilton counties (1 seat)
- Genesee County (2 seats)
- Greene County (2 seats)
- Herkimer County (2 seats)
- Jefferson County (3 seats)
- Kings County (2 seats)
- Lewis County (1 seat)
- Livingston County (2 seats)
- Madison County (3 seats)
- Monroe County (3 seats)
- Montgomery County (2 seats)
- The City and County of New York (13 seats)
- Niagara County (2 seats)
- Oneida County (4 seats)
- Onondaga County (4 seats)
- Ontario County (3 seats)
- Orange County (3 seats)
- Orleans County (1 seat)
- Oswego County (2 seats)
- Otsego County (3 seats)
- Putnam County (1 seat)
- Queens County (1 seat)
- Rensselaer County (3 seats)
- Richmond County (1 seat)
- Rockland County (1 seat)
- St. Lawrence County (2 seats)
- Saratoga County (2 seats)
- Schenectady County (1 seat)
- Schoharie County (2 seats)
- Seneca County (1 seat)
- Steuben County (3 seats)
- Suffolk County (2 seats)
- Sullivan County (1 seat)
- Tioga County (1 seat)
- Tompkins County (2 seats)
- Ulster County (2 seats)
- Warren County (1 seat)
- Washington (2 seats)
- Wayne County (2 seats)
- Westchester County (2 seats)
- Wyoming County (2 seats)
- Yates County (1 seat)
Note: There are now 62 counties in the State of New York. The counties which are not mentioned in this list had not yet been established, or sufficiently organized, the area being included in one or more of the abovementioned counties.

=== Assemblymen ===
The asterisk (*) denotes members of the previous Legislature who continued as members of this Legislature.

Party affiliations follow the vote on State officers on February 1, 7 and 8.

District	Assemblymen	Party	Notes
Albany	John A. Dix	Democrat	
Albany	Cornelius G. Palmer	Democrat	
Albany	Jonas Shear	Democrat	
Allegany	Lorenzo Dana*	Whig	
Allegany	Horace Hunt*	Whig	
Broome	Robert Harpur	Whig	
Cattaraugus	Samuel Barrows	Democrat	
Cattaraugus	Lewis T. Thorp	Democrat	
Cayuga	John L. Cuyler	Democrat	
Cayuga	Vincent Kenyon	Democrat	
Cayuga	Alvarez Tupper	Democrat	
Chautauqua	Rossiter P. Johnson	Whig	
Chautauqua	Austin Pierce	Whig	
Chautauqua	Emory F. Warren	Whig	
Chemung	Samuel G. Hathaway Jr.	Democrat	
Chenango	Clark Burnham	Democrat	
Chenango	Richard W. Juliand	Democrat	
Chenango	Adam Storing	Democrat	
Clinton	Lemuel Stetson	Democrat	also D.A. of Clinton Co.; on November 8, 1842, elected to the 28th U>S> Congress
Columbia	James Knickerbacker	Democrat	
Columbia	Abraham I. Van Alstyne	Democrat	
Columbia	Jared Winslow	Democrat	
Cortland	Jesse Ives	Whig	
Cortland	Oren Stimson	Whig	
Delaware	Samuel Eells	Democrat	
Delaware	Orrin Griffin	Democrat	
Dutchess	Peter K. Dubois	Democrat	
Dutchess	John M. Ketcham	Democrat	
Dutchess	Richard C. Van Wyck	Democrat	
Erie	William A. Bird	Whig	
Erie	Bela H. Colegrove	Whig	
Erie	Squire S. Case	Whig	
Essex	George A. Simmons*	Whig	
Franklin	Thomas R. Powell	Whig	
Fulton and Hamilton	John Patterson	Democrat	
Genesee	Robinson Smiley	Whig	
Genesee	Albert Smith	Whig	on November 8, 1842, elected to the 28th U.S. Congress
Greene	John Laraway	Democrat	
Greene	Andrew T. Van Slyke	Democrat	
Herkimer	Michael Hoffman*	Democrat	
Herkimer	Arphaxed Loomis*	Democrat	
Jefferson	Elihu C. Church	Democrat	
Jefferson	Elihu M. McNeil	Democrat	
Jefferson	John W. Tamblin	Democrat	
Kings	John A. Lott	Democrat	
Kings	William M. Udall	Democrat	
Lewis	Carlos P. Scovil	Democrat	
Livingston	Gardner Arnold	Whig	
Livingston	Chester Bradley	Whig	
Madison	Simon C. Hitchcock	Democrat	
Madison	Calvin Morse	Democrat	
Madison	Job Wells	Democrat	
Monroe	Henry K. Higgins	Whig	
Monroe	Frederick Starr	Whig	
Monroe	George S. Stone	Whig	
Montgomery	James Diefendorf	Whig	
Montgomery	Lawrence Marcellus	Democrat	
New York	Elbridge G. Baldwin	Whig	
New York	Auguste Davezac	Democrat	
New York	David R. Floyd-Jones*	Democrat	
New York	Paul Grout*	Democrat	
New York	William Jones	Whig	
New York	William B. Maclay*	Democrat	on November 8, 1842, elected to the 28th U.S. Congress
New York	William McMurray*	Democrat	
New York	John L. O'Sullivan*	Democrat	
New York	Daniel C. Pentz	Democrat	
New York	Conrad Swackhamer*	Democrat	
New York	Solomon Townsend*	Democrat	
New York	Joseph Tucker	Whig	
New York	George Weir*	Democrat	
Niagara	Thomas T. Flagler	Whig	
Niagara	Francis O. Pratt*	Whig	
Oneida	Ichabod C. Baker	Democrat	
Oneida	Ebenezer Robbins	Democrat	
Oneida	Horatio Seymour	Democrat	
Oneida	DeWitt C. Stephens	Democrat	
Onondaga	William Fuller*	Democrat	
Onondaga	David Munro*	Democrat	
Onondaga	John Spencer	Democrat	
Onondaga	William Taylor*	Democrat	
Ontario	Peter M. Dox	Whig	
Ontario	Staats Green	Whig	
Ontario	Joseph C. Shelton	Whig	
Orange	Stacey Beakes	Democrat	
Orange	Robert Lawson	Democrat	
Orange	Roswell Mead	Democrat	
Orleans	Sanford E. Church	Democrat	
Oswego	Peter Devendorf	Democrat	
Oswego	Robert C. Kenyon	Democrat	
Otsego	Leonard Caryl	Democrat	
Otsego	Levi S. Chatfield*	Democrat	elected Speaker
Otsego	Festus Hyde	Democrat	
Putnam	Ebenezer Foster	Democrat	
Queens	John W. Lawrence*	Democrat	
Rensselaer	George R. Davis	Democrat	also First Judge of the Rensselaer County Court
Rensselaer	Martinus Lansing	Democrat	
Rensselaer	Silas W. Waite	Democrat	
Richmond	Henry Cole	Democrat	
Rockland	Edward De Noyelles*	Democrat	
St. Lawrence	Calvin T. Hulburd	Democrat	
St. Lawrence	George Redington	Democrat	
Saratoga	John Cramer	Democrat	
Saratoga	Halsey Rogers	Democrat	
Schenectady	Jonathan C. Burnham	Democrat	
Schoharie	Bill Fink	Democrat	
Schoharie	George Wright	Democrat	
Seneca	William C. Kelly	Democrat	
Steuben	Aaron C. Beach	Democrat	
Steuben	Francis E. Erwin	Democrat	
Steuben	Ziba A. Leland	Democrat	
Suffolk	Richard A. Udall	Democrat	
Suffolk	Benjamin F. Wells	Democrat	
Sullivan	Matthew Brown	Democrat	
Tioga	John McQuigg	Democrat	
Tompkins	Charles Humphrey	Democrat	
Tompkins	Bernardus Swartwout	Democrat	
Ulster	Abraham Jansen	Democrat	
Ulster	Jeremiah Russell	Democrat	on November 8, 1842, elected to the 28th U.S. Congress
Warren	Benjamin P. Burhans	Democrat	
Washington	James McKie Jr.	Whig	
Washington	Dan S. Wright	Whig	
Wayne	Theron R. Strong	Democrat	
Wayne	James M. Wilson	Democrat	
Westchester	Joseph T. Carpenter*	Democrat	
Westchester	Horatio Lockwood*	Democrat	
Wyoming	Eleazer Baldwin	Whig	
Wyoming	John W. Brownson*	Whig	previously a member from Genesee Co.
Yates	Henry Spence	Democrat	

=== Employees ===
- Clerk: John O. Cole
- Sergeant-at-Arms: Abner N. Beardsley
- Doorkeeper: John W. Turner
- Assistant Doorkeepers: George Van Deusen
- Second Assistant Doorkeeper: Pliny M. Bromley, from January 8, 1842

== Sources ==
- The New York Civil List compiled by Franklin Benjamin Hough (Weed, Parsons and Co., 1858) [pg. 109 and 441 for Senate districts; pg. 133 for senators; pg. 148f for Assembly districts; pg. 225ff for assemblymen]
- Political History of the State of New York from January 1, 1841, to January 1, 1847, Vol III, including the Life of Silas Wright (Hall & Dickson, Syracuse NY, 1848; pg. 247 to 311)
- The Tribune Almanac 1838 to 1868 ("The Whig Almanac 1843"; pg. 39)
