= 63rd New York State Legislature =

New York state legislative session

←	62nd	64th	→
- The Old State Capitol (1879)

Overview
- Legislative body: New York State Legislature
- Jurisdiction: New York, United States
- Term: January 1 – December 31, 1840

Senate
- Members: 32
- President: Lt. Gov. Luther Bradish (W)
- Party control: Whig (20-12)

Assembly
- Members: 128
- Speaker: George W. Patterson (W)
- Party control: Whig (70-58)

Sessions
- 1st: January 7 – May 14, 1840

The 63rd New York State Legislature, consisting of the New York State Senate and the New York State Assembly, met from January 7 to May 14, 1840, during the second year of William H. Seward's governorship, in Albany.

== Background ==
Under the provisions of the New York Constitution of 1821, 32 Senators were elected on general tickets in eight senatorial districts for four-year terms. They were divided into four classes, and every year eight Senate seats came up for election. Assemblymen were elected countywide on general tickets to a one-year term, the whole Assembly being renewed annually.

State Senator Noadiah Johnson died on April 4, 1839; and State Senator Edward P. Livingston resigned on October 9, 1839; leaving two vacancies in the Third District.

At this time there were two political parties: the Democratic Party and the Whig Party.

== Elections ==
The State election was held from November 4 to 6, 1839.

State Senator John Hunter (2nd D.) was re-elected.

1839 New York State Senate election result
District	Whig		Democrat	
First	Philip Hone	21,396	Minthorne Tompkins	23,385
Second	Pierre Van Cortlandt, Jr.	22,152	John Hunter	23,669
Third	Friend Humphrey	24,716	William K. Wilson	24,549
Third	Mitchell Sanford	24,675	Henry W. Strong	24,533
Third	Erastus Root	24,551	Amasa J. Parker	24,517
Fourth	James G. Hopkins	24,312	Sidney Lawrence	22,933
Fifth	James Brackett	21,150	Sumner Ely	22,792
Sixth	Andrew B. Dickinson	23,893	William Maxwell	23,517
Seventh	Mark H. Sibley	24,049	Joshua Lee	22,831
Eighth	Abram Dixon	21,927	Isaac R. Elwood	15,603

== Sessions ==
The Legislature met for the regular session at the Old State Capitol in Albany on January 7, 1840; and adjourned on May 14.

George W. Patterson (W) was re-elected Speaker with 68 votes against 56 for Levi S. Chatfield (D).

Upon taking their seats in the Senate, Humphrey, Sanford and Root drew lots to decide which one of the three senators elected in the Third District would serve which term. Sanford drew the one-year term, Humphrey the two-year term, and Root the full term.

On January 14, the Legislature elected Nathaniel P. Tallmadge (W) to the seat in the U.S. Senate which he had vacated on March 4, 1839.

On January 20, Mayor of Rochester Samuel G. Andrews was elected Clerk of the Senate, to succeed John F. Bacon who had been Clerk since 1814.

The Legislature appointed Thurlow Weed to succeed Edwin Croswell as State Printer.

On February 3, Lt. Gov. Bradish did not attend the session, and Frederick A. Tallmadge was elected president pro tempore of the Senate. On the same day, Jacob Haight (W) was re-elected State Treasurer.

On February 22, the Legislature elected George H. Boughton, Simon Newton Dexter, Henry Hamilton, David Hudson and Asa Whitney to succeed William Baker, William C. Bouck, John Bowman, Jonas Earll, Jr. and State Senator Samuel Young as Canal Commissioners.

On September 2, the Democratic state convention met at Syracuse, and nominated William C. Bouck for Governor, and State Senator Daniel S. Dickinson for Lieutenant Governor.

The Whig state convention nominated Gov. Seward and Lt. Gov. Bradish for re-election.

== State Senate ==
=== Districts ===
- The First District (4 seats) consisted of Kings, New York and Richmond counties.
- The Second District (4 seats) consisted of Dutchess, Orange, Putnam, Queens, Rockland, Suffolk, Sullivan, Ulster and Westchester counties.
- The Third District (4 seats) consisted of Albany, Columbia, Delaware, Greene, Rensselaer, Schenectady and Schoharie counties.
- The Fourth District (4 seats) consisted of Clinton, Essex, Franklin, Fulton, Hamilton, Herkimer, Montgomery, St. Lawrence, Saratoga, Warren and Washington counties.
- The Fifth District (4 seats) consisted of Jefferson, Lewis, Madison, Oneida, Oswego and Otsego counties.
- The Sixth District (4 seats) consisted of Allegany, Broome, Cattaraugus, Chemung, Chenango, Livingston, Steuben, Tioga and Tompkins counties.
- The Seventh District (4 seats) consisted of Cayuga, Cortland, Onondaga, Ontario, Seneca, Wayne and Yates counties.
- The Eighth District (4 seats) consisted of Chautauqua, Erie, Genesee, Monroe, Niagara and Orleans counties.
Note: There are now 62 counties in the State of New York. The counties which are not mentioned in this list had not yet been established, or sufficiently organized, the area being included in one or more of the abovementioned counties.

=== Members ===
The asterisk (*) denotes members of the previous Legislature who continued in office as members of this Legislature.

District	Senators	Term left	Party	Notes
First	Frederick A. Tallmadge*	1 year	Whig	on February 3, 1840, elected president pro tempore
First	Gulian C. Verplanck*	2 years	Whig	
First	Gabriel Furman*	3 years	Whig	
First	Minthorne Tompkins	4 years	Democrat	
Second	Henry H. Van Dyck*	1 year	Democrat	
Second	Henry A. Livingston*	2 years	Whig	
Second	Daniel Johnson*	3 years	Democrat	
Second	John Hunter*	4 years	Democrat	
Third	Mitchell Sanford	1 year	Whig	elected to fill vacancy, in place of Noadiah Johnson
Third	Friend Humphrey	2 years	Whig	elected to fill vacancy, in place of Edward P. Livingston
Third	Alonzo C. Paige*	3 years	Democrat	
Third	Erastus Root	4 years	Whig	
Fourth	Samuel Young*	1 year	Democrat	until February 13, 1840, also a Canal Commissioner
Fourth	Martin Lee*	2 years	Whig	
Fourth	Bethuel Peck*	3 years	Whig	
Fourth	James G. Hopkins	4 years	Whig	
Fifth	David Wager*	1 year	Democrat	
Fifth	Avery Skinner*	2 years	Democrat	also Postmaster of Union Square
Fifth	Joseph Clark*	3 years	Democrat	
Fifth	Sumner Ely	4 years	Democrat	
Sixth	Daniel S. Dickinson*	1 year	Democrat	
Sixth	Laurens Hull*	2 years	Whig	
Sixth	Alvah Hunt*	3 years	Whig	
Sixth	Andrew B. Dickinson	4 years	Whig	
Seventh	Samuel L. Edwards*	1 year	Democrat	
Seventh	John Maynard*	2 years	Whig	in November 1840 elected to the 27th U.S. Congress
Seventh	Robert C. Nicholas*	3 years	Whig	
Seventh	Mark H. Sibley	4 years	Whig	
Eighth	Samuel Works*	1 year	Whig	
Eighth	William A. Moseley*	2 years	Whig	
Eighth	Henry Hawkins*	3 years	Whig	
Eighth	Abram Dixon	4 years	Whig	

=== Employees ===
- Clerk: John F. Bacon, until January 20, 1840
  - Samuel G. Andrews, from January 20, 1840
- Sergeant-at-Arms: Richard M. Meigs
- Doorkeeper: Philip M. De Zeng
- Assistant Doorkeeper: Chauncey Dexter, from January 25, 1840

== State Assembly ==
=== Districts ===
- Albany County (3 seats)
- Allegany County (2 seats)
- Broome County (1 seat)
- Cattaraugus County (2 seats)
- Cayuga County (3 seats)
- Chautauqua County (3 seats)
- Chemung County (1 seat)
- Chenango County (3 seats)
- Clinton County (1 seat)
- Columbia County (3 seats)
- Cortland County (2 seats)
- Delaware County (2 seats)
- Dutchess County (3 seats)
- Erie County (3 seats)
- Essex County (1 seat)
- Franklin County (1 seat)
- Fulton and Hamilton counties (1 seat)
- Genesee County (4 seats)
- Greene County (2 seats)
- Herkimer County (2 seats)
- Jefferson County (3 seats)
- Kings County (2 seats)
- Lewis County (1 seat)
- Livingston County (2 seats)
- Madison County (3 seats)
- Monroe County (3 seats)
- Montgomery County (2 seats)
- The City and County of New York (13 seats)
- Niagara County (2 seats)
- Oneida County (4 seats)
- Onondaga County (4 seats)
- Ontario County (3 seats)
- Orange County (3 seats)
- Orleans County (1 seat)
- Oswego County (2 seats)
- Otsego County (3 seats)
- Putnam County (1 seat)
- Queens County (1 seat)
- Rensselaer County (3 seats)
- Richmond County (1 seat)
- Rockland County (1 seat)
- St. Lawrence County (2 seats)
- Saratoga County (2 seats)
- Schenectady County (1 seat)
- Schoharie County (2 seats)
- Seneca County (1 seat)
- Steuben County (3 seats)
- Suffolk County (2 seats)
- Sullivan County (1 seat)
- Tioga County (1 seat)
- Tompkins County (2 seats)
- Ulster County (2 seats)
- Warren County (1 seat)
- Washington (2 seats)
- Wayne County (2 seats)
- Westchester County (2 seats)
- Yates County (1 seat)
Note: There are now 62 counties in the State of New York. The counties which are not mentioned in this list had not yet been established, or sufficiently organized, the area being included in one or more of the abovementioned counties.

=== Assemblymen ===
The asterisk (*) denotes members of the previous Legislature who continued as members of this Legislature.

Party affiliations follow the result given in The New Yorker.

District	Assemblymen	Party	Notes
Albany	Frederick Bassler Jr.	Whig	
Albany	Peter Flagler	Whig	
Albany	Henry G. Wheaton	Whig	
Allegany	Lorenzo Dana	Whig	
Allegany	William Welch*	Whig	
Broome	Cornelius Mersereau	Whig	
Cattaraugus	George A. S. Crooker*	Whig	
Cattaraugus	Timothy H. Porter	Whig	
Cayuga	Artemas Cady	Democrat	
Cayuga	John W. McFadden	Whig	
Cayuga	Andrews Preston	Democrat	
Chautauqua	Odin Benedict	Whig	
Chautauqua	George A. French	Whig	
Chautauqua	William Rice	Whig	
Chemung	Guy Hulett	Democrat	
Chenango	William Church	Whig	
Chenango	Demas Hubbard, Jr.*	Whig	
Chenango	Samuel Plumb	Whig	
Clinton	Abijah North*	Democrat	
Columbia	Robert McKinstry	Whig	
Columbia	Jonas H. Miller	Whig	
Columbia	Justin Niles	Whig	
Cortland	William Barnes	Whig	
Cortland	Jabez B. Phelps	Whig	
Delaware	Orson M. Allaben	Democrat	
Delaware	Nathan Bristol	Democrat	
Dutchess	Amos Bryan	Whig	
Dutchess	Henry Conklin*	Whig	
Dutchess	Daniel Toffey*	Whig	
Erie	Seth C. Hawley	Whig	
Erie	Stephen Osborn	Whig	
Erie	Aaron Salisbury	Whig	
Essex	George A. Simmons	Whig	
Franklin	John S. Eldridge	Whig	
Fulton and Hamilton	Langdon I. Marvin	Whig	
Genesee	John W. Brownson	Whig	
Genesee	Horace Healy*	Whig	
Genesee	Alva Jefferson*	Whig	
Genesee	George W. Lay	Whig	
Greene	Gilbert Bedell	Democrat	
Greene	Sylvester Nichols	Democrat	
Herkimer	Daniel Bellinger	Democrat	
Herkimer	George Burch	Democrat	
Jefferson	Calvin Clark*	Whig	
Jefferson	Charles E. Clarke*	Whig	
Jefferson	Stephen Johnson	Whig	
Kings	Jeremiah Johnson	Whig	
Kings	Adrian Hegeman	Democrat	
Lewis	Chester Buck	Whig	
Livingston	Elias Clark*	Whig	
Livingston	George W. Patterson*	Whig	re-elected Speaker
Madison	Daniel Barker	Democrat	
Madison	Daniel Dickey	Democrat	
Madison	Benjamin Enos*	Democrat	
Monroe	George Brown	Whig	
Monroe	Derick Sibley	Whig	
Monroe	Enoch Strong	Whig	
Montgomery	John S. Veeder	Democrat	
Montgomery	Peter Wood	Democrat	
New York	Cornelius H. Bryson	Democrat	
New York	Ulysses D. French	Democrat	
New York	Paul Grout	Democrat	
New York	Thomas Herttell	Democrat	
New York	Norman Hickok	Democrat	
New York	Francis W. Lasak	Democrat	
New York	William B. Maclay	Democrat	
New York	John J. Morgan	Democrat	
New York	Edmund J. Porter	Democrat	
New York	James J. Roosevelt Jr.	Democrat	in November 1840 elected to the 27th U.S. Congress
New York	Thomas Spofford	Democrat	
New York	Solomon Townsend	Democrat	
New York	George Weir	Democrat	
Niagara	Peter B. Porter, Jr.*	Whig	
Niagara	Francis O. Pratt	Whig	
Oneida	Nelson Dawley	Democrat	
Oneida	Anson Knibloe	Democrat	
Oneida	Charles A. Mann	Democrat	
Oneida	John F. Trowbridge	Democrat	
Onondaga	Victory Birdseye	Whig	in November 1840 elected to the 27th U.S. Congress
Onondaga	Phares Gould*	Whig	
Onondaga	James R. Lawrence*	Whig	
Onondaga	Azariah Smith*	Whig	
Ontario	Reynold Peck	Whig	
Ontario	Abraham A. Post	Whig	
Ontario	Henry W. Taylor*	Whig	
Orange	Benjamin Brown	Democrat	
Orange	Robert Denniston*	Democrat	
Orange	William S. Little	Democrat	
Orleans	John J. Walbridge	Whig	
Oswego	Peter Devendorf	Democrat	
Oswego	William Duer	Whig	
Otsego	Levi S. Chatfield*	Democrat	
Otsego	Charles Walker	Democrat	
Otsego	Arnold B. Watson	Democrat	
Putnam	Saxton Smith	Democrat	
Queens	John A. King	Whig	
Rensselaer	Garrardus Deyoe	Whig	
Rensselaer	Samuel W. Hoag	Whig	
Rensselaer	William H. Van Schoonhoven	Whig	
Richmond	Bornt P. Winant	Democrat	
Rockland	William F. Fraser	Democrat	
St. Lawrence	Zenas Clark	Democrat	
St. Lawrence	Asa Sprague*	Democrat	
Saratoga	Daniel Stewart	Whig	
Saratoga	John Stewart*	Whig	
Schenectady	Theodore W. Sanders	Whig	unsuccessfully contested by John I. De Graff (D)
Schoharie	Seymour Boughton	Democrat	
Schoharie	Charles Goodyear	Democrat	
Seneca	Orange W. Wilkinson	Democrat	
Steuben	Richard Brower	Democrat	
Steuben	Andrew G. Chatfield*	Democrat	
Steuben	Abram M. Lybolt*	Democrat	
Suffolk	David Halsey	Democrat	
Suffolk	John M. Williamson	Democrat	
Sullivan	Daniel B. St. John	Whig	
Tioga	Thomas Farrington	Democrat	until January 20, 1840, also Surrogate of Tioga Co.
Tompkins	William H. L. Bogart	Whig	
Tompkins	Robert Swartwout	Whig	
Ulster	David L. Bernard	Whig	
Ulster	John V. L. Overbagh	Whig	
Warren	Joseph Russell	Democrat	
Washington	John H. Boyd	Whig	
Washington	Anderson Simpson	Whig	
Wayne	Horace Morley	Whig	
Wayne	Durfee Osband	Whig	
Westchester	Samuel B. Ferris*	Democrat	
Westchester	Joseph Strang*	Democrat	
Yates	Samuel S. Ellsworth	Democrat	

=== Employees ===
- Clerk: Philander B. Prindle
- Sergeant-at-Arms: Minos McGowen
- Doorkeeper: Samuel Francis Jr.
- Assistant Doorkeeper: Abraham H. Grovesteen

== Sources ==
- The New York Civil List compiled by Franklin Benjamin Hough (Weed, Parsons and Co., 1858) [pg. 109 and 441 for Senate districts; pg. 132 for senators; pg. 148f for Assembly districts; pg. 223f for assemblymen]
- The History of Political Parties in the State of New-York, from the Ratification of the Federal Constitution to 1840 by Jabez D. Hammond (4th ed., Vol. 2, Phinney & Co., Buffalo, 1850; pg. 517 to 528)
- The Politician's Register published by Horace Greeley (1840; pg. 55f)
- A Political Register for 1840 published by E. C. Markley (Philadelphia, 1840; pg. 17f)
- The New Yorker (issue of November 16, 1839)
