= John W. Brownson =

John W. Brownson may refer to:

- John W. Brownson (New York politician) (1807–1860)
- John W. Brownson (Wisconsin politician) (1842–1924)
