= 64th New York State Legislature =

New York state legislative session

←	63rd	65th	→
- The Old State Capitol (1879)

Overview
- Legislative body: New York State Legislature
- Jurisdiction: New York, United States
- Term: January 1 – December 31, 1841

Senate
- Members: 32
- President: Lt. Gov. Luther Bradish (W)
- Party control: Whig (21-11)

Assembly
- Members: 128
- Speaker: Peter B. Porter, Jr. (W)
- Party control: Whig (66-62)

Sessions
- 1st: January 5 – May 26, 1841

The 64th New York State Legislature, consisting of the New York State Senate and the New York State Assembly, met from January 5 to May 25, 1841, during the third year of William H. Seward's governorship, in Albany.

== Background ==
Under the provisions of the New York Constitution of 1821, 32 Senators were elected on general tickets in eight senatorial districts for four-year terms. They were divided into four classes, and eight Senate seats came up for election every year. Assemblymen were elected countywide on general tickets to a one-year term, the whole Assembly being renewed annually.

At this time there were two political parties: the Democratic Party and the Whig Party.

On September 2, the Democratic state convention met at Syracuse, and nominated William C. Bouck for governor, and State Senator Daniel S. Dickinson for lieutenant governor.

The Whig state convention nominated Gov. Seward and Lt. Gov. Bradish for re-election.

== Elections ==
The State election was held from November 2 to 4, 1840. Gov. William H. Seward and Lt. Gov. Luther Bradish were re-elected. Also, the Whig electoral ticket won, and New York's 42 electoral votes were cast for William Henry Harrison and John Tyler.

State Senator Samuel Works (8th D.) was re-elected.

1840 New York State Senate election result
District	Whig		Democrat	
First	Samuel Stevens	24,847	John B. Scott	26,246
Second	John T. Jansen	26,049	Robert Denniston	30,049
Third	Jonas C. Heartt	26,766	Henry W. Strong	28,334
Fourth	John W. Taylor	29,387	Gardner Stow	27,659
Fifth	Chester Buck	28,139	Henry A. Foster	29,196
Sixth	Nehemiah Platt	29,100	James Faulkner	27,971
Seventh	Elijah Rhoades	27,877	John Watson	26,068
Eighth	Samuel Works	31,430	John T. Hudson	20,381

== Sessions ==
The Legislature met for the regular session at the Old State Capitol in Albany on January 5, 1841; and the Assembly adjourned on May 25, the Senate on May 26.

Peter B. Porter, Jr. (W) was elected Speaker with 65 votes against 60 for Levi S. Chatfield (D).

On January 27, the Legislature elected John A. Collier (W) to succeed Bates Cooke (W) as State Comptroller.

The Legislature re-elected State Treasurer Jacob Haight (W), and Surveyor General Orville L. Holley.

In February, the Governor and Senate removed Robert H. Morris from the office of Recorder of New York City. Three months later Morris was elected Mayor of New York City.

On May 19, Wyoming County was split from Genesee County, and was apportioned two seats in the Assembly. Genesee County remained with the other two seats.

== State Senate ==
=== Districts ===
- The First District (4 seats) consisted of Kings, New York and Richmond counties.
- The Second District (4 seats) consisted of Dutchess, Orange, Putnam, Queens, Rockland, Suffolk, Sullivan, Ulster and Westchester counties.
- The Third District (4 seats) consisted of Albany, Columbia, Delaware, Greene, Rensselaer, Schenectady and Schoharie counties.
- The Fourth District (4 seats) consisted of Clinton, Essex, Franklin, Fulton, Hamilton, Herkimer, Montgomery, St. Lawrence, Saratoga, Warren and Washington counties.
- The Fifth District (4 seats) consisted of Jefferson, Lewis, Madison, Oneida, Oswego and Otsego counties.
- The Sixth District (4 seats) consisted of Allegany, Broome, Cattaraugus, Chemung, Chenango, Livingston, Steuben, Tioga and Tompkins counties.
- The Seventh District (4 seats) consisted of Cayuga, Cortland, Onondaga, Ontario, Seneca, Wayne and Yates counties.
- The Eighth District (4 seats) consisted of Chautauqua, Erie, Genesee, Monroe, Niagara and Orleans counties.
Note: There are now 62 counties in the State of New York. The counties which are not mentioned in this list had not yet been established, or sufficiently organized, the area being included in one or more of the abovementioned counties.

=== Members ===
The asterisk (*) denotes members of the previous Legislature who continued in office as members of this Legislature. Robert Denniston changed from the Assembly to the Senate.

District	Senators	Term left	Party	Notes
First	Gulian C. Verplanck*	1 year	Whig	
First	Gabriel Furman*	2 years	Whig	
First	Minthorne Tompkins*	3 years	Democrat	resigned on March 8, 1841
First	John B. Scott	4 years	Democrat	
Second	Henry A. Livingston*	1 year	Whig	
Second	Daniel Johnson*	2 years	Democrat	
Second	John Hunter*	3 years	Democrat	
Second	Robert Denniston*	4 years	Democrat	
Third	Friend Humphrey*	1 year	Whig	
Third	Alonzo C. Paige*	2 years	Democrat	
Third	Erastus Root*	3 years	Whig	
Third	Henry W. Strong	4 years	Democrat	also Recorder of Troy
Fourth	Martin Lee*	1 year	Whig	
Fourth	Bethuel Peck*	2 years	Whig	
Fourth	James G. Hopkins*	3 years	Whig	
Fourth	John W. Taylor	4 years	Whig	
Fifth	Avery Skinner*	1 year	Democrat	also Postmaster of Union Square
Fifth	Joseph Clark*	2 years	Democrat	
Fifth	Sumner Ely*	3 years	Democrat	
Fifth	Henry A. Foster	4 years	Democrat	
Sixth	Laurens Hull*	1 year	Whig	
Sixth	Alvah Hunt*	2 years	Whig	
Sixth	Andrew B. Dickinson*	3 years	Whig	
Sixth	Nehemiah Platt	4 years	Whig	
Seventh	John Maynard*	1 year	Whig	in November 1840 elected to the 27th U.S. Congress; resigned on March 4, 1841
Seventh	Robert C. Nicholas*	2 years	Whig	
Seventh	Mark H. Sibley*	3 years	Whig	resigned on May 28, 1841
Seventh	Elijah Rhoades	4 years	Whig	
Eighth	William A. Moseley*	1 year	Whig	
Eighth	Henry Hawkins*	2 years	Whig	
Eighth	Abram Dixon*	3 years	Whig	
Eighth	Samuel Works*	4 years	Whig	

=== Employees ===
- Clerk: Samuel G. Andrews
- Deputy Clerks: Friend W. Humphrey, William H. Rice
- Sergeant-at-Arms: Richard M. Meigs
- Doorkeeper: Philip M. De Zeng
- Assistant Doorkeeper: Chauncey Dexter

== State Assembly ==
=== Districts ===
- Albany County (3 seats)
- Allegany County (2 seats)
- Broome County (1 seat)
- Cattaraugus County (2 seats)
- Cayuga County (3 seats)
- Chautauqua County (3 seats)
- Chemung County (1 seat)
- Chenango County (3 seats)
- Clinton County (1 seat)
- Columbia County (3 seats)
- Cortland County (2 seats)
- Delaware County (2 seats)
- Dutchess County (3 seats)
- Erie County (3 seats)
- Essex County (1 seat)
- Franklin County (1 seat)
- Fulton and Hamilton counties (1 seat)
- Genesee County (4 seats)
- Greene County (2 seats)
- Herkimer County (2 seats)
- Jefferson County (3 seats)
- Kings County (2 seats)
- Lewis County (1 seat)
- Livingston County (2 seats)
- Madison County (3 seats)
- Monroe County (3 seats)
- Montgomery County (2 seats)
- The City and County of New York (13 seats)
- Niagara County (2 seats)
- Oneida County (4 seats)
- Onondaga County (4 seats)
- Ontario County (3 seats)
- Orange County (3 seats)
- Orleans County (1 seat)
- Oswego County (2 seats)
- Otsego County (3 seats)
- Putnam County (1 seat)
- Queens County (1 seat)
- Rensselaer County (3 seats)
- Richmond County (1 seat)
- Rockland County (1 seat)
- St. Lawrence County (2 seats)
- Saratoga County (2 seats)
- Schenectady County (1 seat)
- Schoharie County (2 seats)
- Seneca County (1 seat)
- Steuben County (3 seats)
- Suffolk County (2 seats)
- Sullivan County (1 seat)
- Tioga County (1 seat)
- Tompkins County (2 seats)
- Ulster County (2 seats)
- Warren County (1 seat)
- Washington (2 seats)
- Wayne County (2 seats)
- Westchester County (2 seats)
- Yates County (1 seat)
Note: There are now 62 counties in the State of New York. The counties which are not mentioned in this list had not yet been established, or sufficiently organized, the area being included in one or more of the abovementioned counties.

=== Assemblymen ===
The asterisk (*) denotes members of the previous Legislature who continued as members of this Legislature.

Party affiliations follow the result given in The New Yorker.

District	Assemblymen	Party	Notes
Albany	Aaron Houghtailing	Whig	
Albany	Francis Lansing	Democrat	
Albany	Henry G. Wheaton*	Whig	
Allegany	Lorenzo Dana*	Whig	
Allegany	Horace Hunt	Whig	
Broome	Gideon M. Hotchkiss	Whig	
Cattaraugus	Alonzo Hawley	Whig	
Cattaraugus	Chester Howe	Whig	
Cayuga	Darius Adams	Whig	
Cayuga	John W. McFadden*	Whig	
Cayuga	Osman Rhoades	Whig	
Chautauqua	Benjamin Douglass	Whig	
Chautauqua	George A. French*	Whig	
Chautauqua	Robertson Whiteside	Whig	
Chemung	Jefferson B. Clark	Whig	
Chenango	Calvin Cole	Whig	
Chenango	Eber Dimmick	Whig	
Chenango	Benson H. Wheeler	Whig	
Clinton	George M. Beckwith	Whig	
Columbia	Waterman Lippitt	Democrat	
Columbia	William G. Mandeville	Democrat	
Columbia	John Milham	Democrat	
Cortland	Nathan Heaton	Whig	
Cortland	Lovel G. Mickels	Whig	
Delaware	Stephen H. Keeler	Democrat	
Delaware	Charles Knapp	Democrat	
Dutchess	Jonathan Akin	Democrat	
Dutchess	Edmund Elmendorf	Democrat	
Dutchess	John Thompson	Democrat	
Erie	Carlos Emmons	Whig	
Erie	Seth C. Hawley*	Whig	
Erie	Stephen Osborn*	Whig	
Essex	George A. Simmons*	Whig	
Franklin	John S. Eldridge*	Whig	
Fulton and Hamilton	Jenison G. Ward	Whig	
Genesee	John W. Brownson*	Whig	
Genesee	Samuel Richmond	Whig	
Genesee	David Scott	Whig	
Genesee	Isaac N. Stoddard	Whig	
Greene	Turhand K. Cooke	Democrat	
Greene	Daniel G. Quackenboss	Democrat	
Herkimer	Michael Hoffman	Democrat	
Herkimer	Arphaxed Loomis	Democrat	
Jefferson	William McAllister	Whig	
Jefferson	William C. Pierrepoint	Whig	
Jefferson	Joseph Webb	Whig	
Kings	William Conselyea	Whig	
Kings	Jeremiah Johnson*	Whig	
Lewis	Eliphalet Sears	Democrat	
Livingston	Augustus Gibbs	Whig	
Livingston	Reuben P. Wisner	Whig	
Madison	Seneca B. Burchard	Whig	
Madison	Oliver Pool	Whig	
Madison	Daniel Van Vleck	Whig	
Monroe	Alexander Kelsey	Whig	
Monroe	Lucius Lilley	Whig	
Monroe	Enoch Strong*	Whig	
Montgomery	Reuben Howe	Democrat	
Montgomery	Daniel F. Nellis	Democrat	
New York	Cornelius H. Bryson*	Democrat	
New York	Abraham B. Davis	Democrat	
New York	David R. Floyd-Jones	Democrat	
New York	Paul Grout*	Democrat	
New York	Norman Hickok*	Democrat	
New York	William B. Maclay*	Democrat	
New York	William McMurray	Democrat	
New York	Absalom E. Miller	Democrat	
New York	John L. O'Sullivan	Democrat	
New York	Edmund J. Porter*	Democrat	
New York	Conrad Swackhamer	Democrat	
New York	Solomon Townsend*	Democrat	
New York	George Weir*	Democrat	
Niagara	Peter B. Porter, Jr.*	Whig	elected Speaker
Niagara	Francis O. Pratt*	Whig	
Oneida	Calvin Dawley	Democrat	
Oneida	Joseph Halleck	Democrat	
Oneida	Luke Hitchcock	Democrat	
Oneida	Nathaniel Odell	Democrat	
Onondaga	Moses D. Burnet	Democrat	
Onondaga	William Fuller	Democrat	
Onondaga	David Munro	Democrat	
Onondaga	William Taylor	Democrat	
Ontario	Isaac Mills	Whig	
Ontario	Daniel A. Robinson	Whig	
Ontario	Alvah Worden	Whig	
Orange	Gideon W. Cock	Democrat	
Orange	Lewis Cuddeback	Democrat	
Orange	Robert Sly	Democrat	
Orleans	Richard W. Gates	Whig	
Oswego	William Duer*	Whig	
Oswego	Edward B. Judson	Whig	
Otsego	Olcott C. Chamberlin	Democrat	
Otsego	Levi S. Chatfield*	Democrat	
Otsego	Joel Gillett	Democrat	also Postmaster of Westville
Putnam	James H. Cornwall	Democrat	
Queens	John W. Lawrence	Democrat	
Rensselaer	Claudius Moffit	Whig	also Postmaster of South Stephentown
Rensselaer	John Tilley	Whig	
Rensselaer	William H. Van Schoonhoven*	Whig	
Richmond	Israel Oakley	Whig	
Rockland	Edward De Noyelles	Democrat	
St. Lawrence	Zenas Clark*	Democrat	
St. Lawrence	Solomon Pratt	Democrat	
Saratoga	Jesse H. Mead	Whig	
Saratoga	Abijah Peck Jr.	Whig	
Schenectady	Abraham Pearse	Whig	
Schoharie	Nicholas Beekman	Democrat	
Schoharie	Jacob C. Skillman	Democrat	
Seneca	Daniel Holman	Democrat	
Steuben	Andrew G. Chatfield*	Democrat	
Steuben	William S. Hubbell	Democrat	
Steuben	Samuel A. Johnson	Democrat	
Suffolk	Josiah C. Dayton	Democrat	
Suffolk	Alanson Seaman	Democrat	
Sullivan	William F. Brodhead	Democrat	
Tioga	Washington Smith	Democrat	
Tompkins	Levi Hubbell	Whig	
Tompkins	Alpha H. Shaw	Whig	
Ulster	Conrad Brodhead	Whig	
Ulster	George G. Graham	Whig	
Warren	George Sanford	Democrat	
Washington	Erastus D. Culver	Whig	
Washington	Reuben Skinner	Whig	
Wayne	Esbon Blackmar	Whig	
Wayne	John M. Holley	Whig	
Westchester	Joseph T. Carpenter	Democrat	
Westchester	Horatio Lockwood	Democrat	
Yates	Heman Chapman	Democrat	

=== Employees ===
- Clerk: Philander B. Prindle
- Sergeant-at-Arms: Daniel H. Bromley
- Doorkeeper: Joseph S. Lockwood
- Assistant Doorkeeper: Abiel W. Howard

== Sources ==
- The New York Civil List compiled by Franklin Benjamin Hough (Weed, Parsons and Co., 1858) [pg. 109 and 441 for Senate districts; pg. 133 for senators; pg. 148f for Assembly districts; pg. 224f for assemblymen]
- Political History of the State of New York from January 1, 1841, to January 1, 1847, Vol III, including the Life of Silas Wright (Hall & Dickson, Syracuse NY, 1848; pg. 182 to 247)
- The Politician's Register published by Horace Greeley (1841; pg. 11f)
