= Lydia Hoyt Farmer =

American novelist (1843–1903)

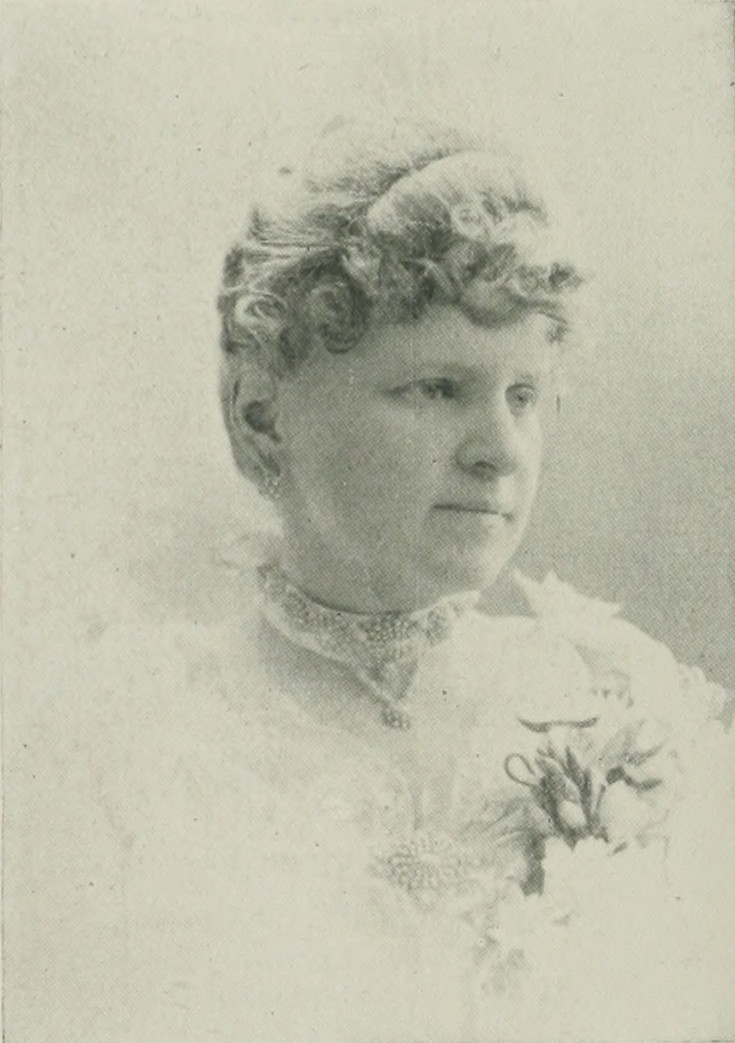
- Photo in A Woman of the Century
- Born: Lydia Hoyt; July 19, 1842; Cleveland, Ohio, U.S.
- Died: December 27, 1903 (aged 61); Cleveland
- Resting place: Lake View Cemetery, Cleveland
- Occupations: author; activist
- Partner: E. J. Farmer (m. 1865)
- Writing career
- Language: English
- Genres: poems; essays; juvenile literature; historical sketches; novels
- Subject: women's rights

Lydia Hoyt Farmer (née, Hoyt; July 19, 1842 or 1843 – December 27, 1903) was a 19th-century American author and women's rights activist. For many years, Farmer contributed to the leading newspapers and magazines, on various lines: poems, essays, juvenile stories, historical sketches and novels. She was of a deeply religious nature, and endeavored to tinge all her writings with a moral as well as an amusing sentiment. She edited What America Owes to Women, for the Woman's Department of the World's Columbian Exposition. Her works included: Aunt Belindy's Point of View; The Doom of the Holy City; A Story Book of Science; A Knight of Faith; Short History of the French Revolution; Girls' Book of Famous Queens; What America Owes to Women; and others.

== Early life and education ==
Lydia Hoyt was born in Cleveland, Ohio, on July 19, 1842. (Note: Rose (1914) records the date of birth as July 19, 1843.) Her father was the Hon. James Madison Hoyt (1815–1895), of Cleveland. Ohio. Her mother was Mary Ella Beebe, daughter of Alexander M. Beebe, LL. D. of New York. Her father practiced law before he engaged in the real estate business, with large and lucrative results. He was a member of the First Baptist Church in Cleveland, and for twenty-five years, superintendent of its Sunday School. For twenty years he was president of the Ohio Baptist State Convention, and for many years president of the American Baptist Home Mission Society. In 1870, he was elected a member of the Ohio State Board of Equalization. In 1871 he visited Europe, and was the author of Glances on the Wing at Foreign Lands. He was honored by Denison University with a degree in LL. D., and subsequently, for twenty years Mr. Hoyt served as a lay preacher in Baptist, Congregational and Presbyterian pulpits, accepting no pay for his services. Her siblings who reached adulthood included Rev. Dr. Wayland Hoyt, of Minneapolis, James H. Hoyt, of Cleveland, Colegate Hoyt, of New York, and Elton Hoyt, of Minnesota.

Due to her status, Farmer received educational advantages that allowed her to express fondness aptitude in the arts. Unlike many children of the wealthier class, she improved and made use of the talents given to her, while thoroughly educated in music, art and literature.

== Career ==
On October 6, 1865, she married the Hon. E. J. Farmer, of Cleveland, who was the author of several works on politics and finance, and was engaged in large mining enterprises in Colorado. From the early 1880s, she contributed to the leading newspapers and popular magazines. Her writings were various, consisting of poems, essays, juvenile stories, historical sketches and novels. She was the author of A Story Book of Science (Boston, 1886), Boys' Book of Famous Rulers (New York City, 1886), Girls' Book of Famous Queens (New York, 1887), The Prince of the Flaming Star (Boston, 1887), The Life of La Fayette (New York, 1888), A Short History of the French Revolution (New York, 18891, A Knight of Faith (New York, 1889), A Moral Inheritance (New York, 1890), and other works. Farmer's books received high commendation from the press, had wide circulation throughout the country, and her Knight of Faith, a strong religious novel, received flattering recognition from the Hon. William Ewart Gladstone, from whom Farmer was the recipient of a personal note regarding her religious books. Her Prince of the Flaming Star was an operetta, and the words, music and illustrations were all of her production. Her Moral Inheritance, was founded upon "Soul Heredity" and entered into rather novel fields in the realms of fiction. In her Life of La Fayette she had access to original files of newspapers, unique copies of works now out of print, and the private papers of the La Fayette family, and thus was able to incorporate in the book much that had been inaccessible to previous biographers. She completed a historical novel, The Doom of the Holy City: Christ and Casar, founded on the destruction of Jerusalem, and the scenes were laid in that city and in Rome as they appeared in the first century.

She was an indefatigable student, pursuing metaphysical and philosophical research with intense avidity. Her novels were always written for a high purpose, and their whole tendency and teaching were considered healthful and elevating. For years, Farmer instructed Bible classes of young women, having devoted a large portion of her time to Biblical study. She passed most of her life in Cleveland, having resided in that city from childhood, with the exception of five years spent in the city of New York.

== Personal life ==
She had three children: James E. Ernest M., and Ethel F. Farmer.

She died at Cleveland, December 27, 1903, and was buried at Lake View Cemetery, Cleveland.

== Selected works ==
- The boys' book of famous rulers, 1886
- A story book of science, 1886
- The prince of the flaming star: a fairy operetta, 1887
- The life of La Fayette: the knight of liberty in two worlds and two centuries, 1888
- A knight of faith, 1889
- The world's famous queens, 189?
- A moral inheritance, 1891
- What America owes to women: dedicated to the women of America, 1893
- The doom of the Holy City: Christ and Caesar, 1895
- Aunt Belindy's points of view, and A modern Mrs. Malaprop: typical character sketches, 1895
- The chatelaine, 1897
- The world's famous rulers, ca. 1900
