= Friend Humphrey =

American politician

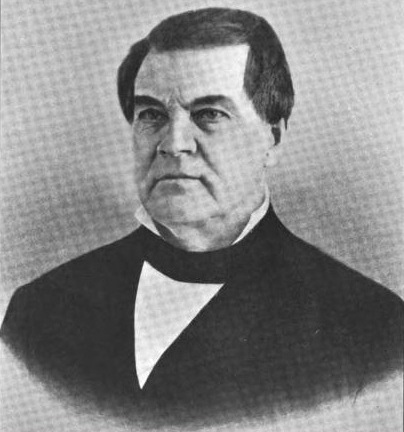

Mayor of Albany, New York
- In office 1849–1850
- Preceded by: John Taylor
- Succeeded by: Franklin Townsend
- In office 1843–1845
- Preceded by: Barent Philip Staats
- Succeeded by: John Keyes Paige

Member of the New York State Senate for the Third District
- In office 1840–1841
- Preceded by: Edward P. Livingston
- Succeeded by: Erastus Corning

Personal details
- Born: March 8, 1787 Simsbury, Connecticut
- Died: March 15, 1854 (aged 67) Albany, New York
- Party: Whig
- Spouses: Hannah Hinman (died 1822) Julia Ann Hoyt (m. 1824; died 1851)

Friend Humphrey (March 8, 1787 – March 15, 1854) was an American merchant, Whig state Senator from New York, and Mayor of Albany from 1849 to 1850.

== Early life ==
He was born in Simsbury, Connecticut on March 8, 1787. He was one of the sons of Noah Humphrey Jr. (1726–c. 1790) and Margaret (née Phelps) Humphrey (c. 1746–c. 1808). His brother was General Chauncey Humphrey.

== Career ==
He was courageous, strong, very energetic, never afraid to do right. Albany never had a Mayor better understood or more popular.

— Bi-centennial history of Albany. History of the county of Albany, N. Y., from 1609 to 1886, 1886

In 1811, he moved to Albany, New York, where he engaged in the leather trade, under the name Friend Humphrey's Son of Albany.

He was a Whig member of the New York State Senate (3rd D.) in 1840 and 1841.

He was elected as Mayor of Albany from 1843 to 1845, and from 1849 to 1850. As mayor, he was known for the advancement of learning and "sound morals" by closing the markets on Sunday.

== Personal life ==
Humphrey married Hannah Hinman (1792–1822), a daughter of Dr. Aaron B. Hinman and Gertrude (née VanderHeyden) Hinman. Her sister Gertrude married Andrew Douw Lansing. Before her death, they were the parents of:

- Gideon Humphrey (1814–1814), who died in infancy.
- Harriet Louisa Humphrey (1819–1897), who married Clark B. Gregory of Danbury.
- Aaron Hinman Humphrey (1822–1822), who died in infancy.

In 1824, he married Julia Ann Hoyt (1804–1851), a daughter of Mary (née Barnum) Hoyt and David Picket Hoyt, a descendant of Simon Hoyt. The Hoyt family arrived at Massachusetts in 1628 and settled in Windsor, Connecticut, and Walker Hoyt was one of the first settlers of Norwalk. Through her brother James, she was an aunt to Colgate Hoyt and Wayland Hoyt. Together, they were the parents of:

- Theodore Friend Humphrey (1829–1911), a merchant and member of Friend Humphrey's Sons who married Margaret McPherson in 1854. (Note: In 1866, Theodore Friend Humphrey became one of the Directors of the National Mechanics' and Farmers' Bank of Albany, which later became a subsidiary of the Bank of New York.)
- James Holt Humphrey (1832–1897), who married Annie Marie Olmsted, a daughter of George Gaylord Olmsted, in 1857.
- Correl Humphrey (1839–1907), who married Helen Clarissa Millard, daughter of David Johnson Millard.
- Alexander Beebe Humphrey (1845–1919), who married Mary Morrison Charles in 1878.

He died on March 15, 1854, in Albany, leaving a good estate, and was buried at the Albany Rural Cemetery in Menands, New York.

=== Residence ===
Around 1841, Humphrey built a two-story frame farmhouse with a gable roof and two symmetrically placed chimneys, today known as the Friend Humphrey House, in Colonie in Albany County, New York.

The transitional vernacular Greek Revival / Federal style dwelling, was listed on the National Register of Historic Places in 1985.

New York State Senate
Preceded by Edward P. Livingston	New York State Senate; Third District (Class 3); 1840–1841	Succeeded by Erastus Corning
Political offices
Preceded by Barent Philip Staats	Mayor of Albany; 1843–1845	Succeeded by John Keyes Paige
Preceded by John Taylor	Mayor of Albany; 1849–1850	Succeeded by Franklin Townsend
