= Attorney General Stow =

Attorney General Stow may refer to:

- Randolph Isham Stow (1828–1878), Attorney General of South Australia
- Gardner Stow (1789–1866), Attorney General of New York
