= Leonard Gibbs =

Leonard Gibbs may refer to:

- Leonard Gibbs (musician), American percussionist
- Leonard Gibbs (assemblyman) (1800–1863), New York assemblyman 1838
- Leonard W. H. Gibbs (1875–1930), New York assemblyman and state senator
