= Lyman Sherwood =

American politician

Lyman Sherwood (August 5, 1802, in Hoosick, Rensselaer County, New York – September 2, 1865, in Lyons, Wayne County, New York) was an American lawyer and politician from New York.

== Life ==
He was the son of Lemuel Sherwood (1775–1839) and Mercy (Rose) Sherwood (1781–1833). On July 4, 1827, he married Rhoda Harmon Hinsdale (1806–1861), and they had two children.

He was Surrogate of Wayne County from 1833 to 1844. He was a member of the New York State Senate (7th D.) in 1842 and 1843.

He was District Attorney of Wayne County from 1846 to 1847. He was First Judge and Surrogate of the Wayne County Court from 1860 to 1863.

== Sources ==
- The New York Civil List compiled by Franklin Benjamin Hough (pages 133f, 145, 384 and 419; Weed, Parsons and Co., 1858)
- The New York Civil List compiled by Franklin Benjamin Hough, Stephen C. Hutchins and Edgar Albert Werner (1867; pg. 436)
- Obituary transcribed from The Commercial Press (issue of October 1865), at NY Gen Web
- Lyman Sherwwood at Ancestry.com

New York State Senate
Preceded by Mark H. Sibley	New York State Senate; Seventh District (Class 1); 1842–1843	Succeeded by Albert Lester
