= Gabriel Furman =

American politician

Gabriel Furman (January 23, 1800 Brooklyn, Kings County, New York — November 11, 1854 Brooklyn) was an American lawyer, historian and politician from New York.

== Life ==
He was the son of Judge William Furman (1765–1852). From 1814 to 1816, he attended Columbia Academy, in Bergen Square.

In 1824, he published Notes Geographical and Historical, Relating to the Town of Brooklyn in Kings County on Long Island (on-line version; 117 pages).

He was a justice of the Brooklyn Municipal Court from 1827 to 1830.

He was a member of the New York State Senate (1st D.) from 1839 to 1842, sitting in the 62nd, 63rd, 64th and 65th New York State Legislatures.

In November 1842 he ran on the Whig ticket for Lieutenant Governor of New York, but was defeated by Democrat Daniel S. Dickinson.

Furman never married, died at the Brooklyn City Hospital, and was buried at the Green-Wood Cemetery in Brooklyn.

Assemblyman Gabriel Furman (1756–1844) was his uncle.

== Sources ==
- The New York Civil List compiled by Franklin Benjamin Hough (pages 132f and 141; Weed, Parsons and Co., 1858)
- A History of the City of Brooklyn by Henry R. Stiles (1869; Vol. II, pg. 41f)
- Two biographical sketches of Gabriel Furman

New York State Senate
| Preceded by Coe S. Downing | New York State Senate; First District (Class 4); 1839–1842 | Succeeded by John A. Lott |
