= Joseph Clark (New York politician) =

American politician

Joseph Clark (October 12, 1787 Westerly, Washington County, Rhode Island — May 11, 1873) was an American politician from New York.

== Life ==
He was the son of Capt. Samuel Clark (1754–1830) and Chloe (Maxson) Clark (d. 1833). In 1801, the family removed to Brookfield, New York. He was a blacksmith and ran a foundry which he sold after his election to the State Senate. He was at times Postmaster, Town Clerk, Justice of the Peace, Town Supervisor, and an associate judge of the Madison County Court. On September 16, 1807, he married Esther Lamphere (1791–1862), and they had several children.

He was a member of the New York State Assembly (Madison Co.) in 1824, 1828 and 1835.

He was a member of the New York State Senate (5th D.) from 1839 to 1842, sitting in the 62nd, 63rd, 64th and 65th New York State Legislatures.

New York State Senate
Preceded by Abijah Beckwith	New York State Senate; Fifth District (Class 4); 1839–1842	Succeeded by Carlos P. Scovil
