= Carlos Emmons =

Carlos Emmons may refer to:

- Carlos Emmons (politician) (1799–1875), American physician and politician
- Carlos Emmons (American football) (born 1973), American football linebacker
