= Barent Staats =

American mayor

Barent Philip Staats (September 25, 1796 – ?) was an American politician who served as the mayor of Albany, New York. Staats ran as a Democrat and defeated John Townsend (Whig) by 336 votes in 1842. The next year he doesn't run for reelection, and Friend Humphrey (Whig) defeated Peter Gansevoort by 226 votes.

During the 57th New York State Legislature from January 1 – December 31, 1834 he was a Jacksonian Assemblyman. He was a doctor.

Philip S. Staats, son of Joachim and Elizabeth (Schuyler) Staats, was born July 26, 1755, and married Annetje Van Alstyne (baptized January 13, 1762). He lived on Staats Island, Rensselaer County, and his fourth child was Barent P. Staats.

Staats married Maria Gourlay. His second wife was Maria Ann Winne and his third wife was Caroline Porter. He is buried at Albany Rural Cemetery in Menands, New York.
