= Edmund Varney =

American politician

Edmund Varney (June 6, 1778 in Amenia, Dutchess County, New York – December 2, 1847 in Russia, Herkimer County, New York) was an American farmer and politician from New York.

== Life ==
He was the son of John Varney and Thankful (Goodspeed) Varney (1746–1820). He married Mehitable Ward (1783–1870). He moved to Russia NY in 1809. He was a Justice of the Peace from 1812 to 1837. He was Clerk of the Town of Russia from 1817 to 1820, in 1822, 1824 and 1828; and Supervisor from 1829 to 1834.

In 1823, he was appointed Associate Judge of the Herkimer County Court. He was a member of the New York State Assembly (Herkimer Co.) in 1826.

He was a member of the New York State Senate (4th D.) from 1842 to 1845, sitting in the 65th, 66th, 67th and 68th New York State Legislatures.

He was buried at the Gravesville Cemetery in Russia NY.

== Sources ==
- The New York Civil List compiled by Franklin Benjamin Hough (pages 133ff, 147, 203 and 313; Weed, Parsons and Co., 1858)
- Varney genealogy from Russia Union Church, 110th Anniversary, 1820-1930, transcribed at NY Gen Web

New York State Senate
Preceded by Martin Lee	New York State Senate; Fourth District (Class 3); 1842–1845	Succeeded by Samuel Young
