= John Wilkinson (Syracuse pioneer) =

Early settler of Syracuse, New York (1798–1862)

John Wilkinson Jr.
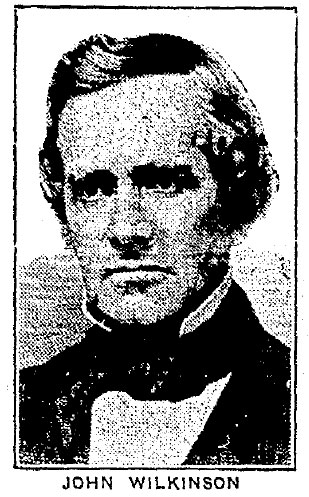
- Born: September 30, 1798; Troy, New York, United States
- Died: September 19, 1862 (aged 63); Syracuse, New York, United States
- Occupations: Postmaster, Lawyer, Assemblyman, Banker, Railroad president
- Spouse: Henrietta Wilhelmina Swartz.
- Children: Joshua Forman Wilkinson (1829-1889); Alfred Wilkinson (1832-1886)
- Parent(s): John Wilkinson (1758-1802); Elizabeth "Betsey" Tower (born 1764)

John Wilkinson (September 30, 1798 – September 19, 1862) was an American lawyer and the first Postmaster of the community known as Bogardus Corners, Cossit's Corners, and Salina in Central New York. As a young man, Wilkinson took inspiration from a poem about an ancient city and named the new village Syracuse just in time for the opening of the Erie Canal. Wilkinson was a prominent citizen in Syracuse and was an original town planner and helped lay out and name the village streets. He also served as an assemblyman and founded the Syracuse Bank in 1838.

John Wilkinson died in Syracuse on September 19, 1862, at age 63.
