= Andrew G. Chatfield =

American politician (1810–1875)

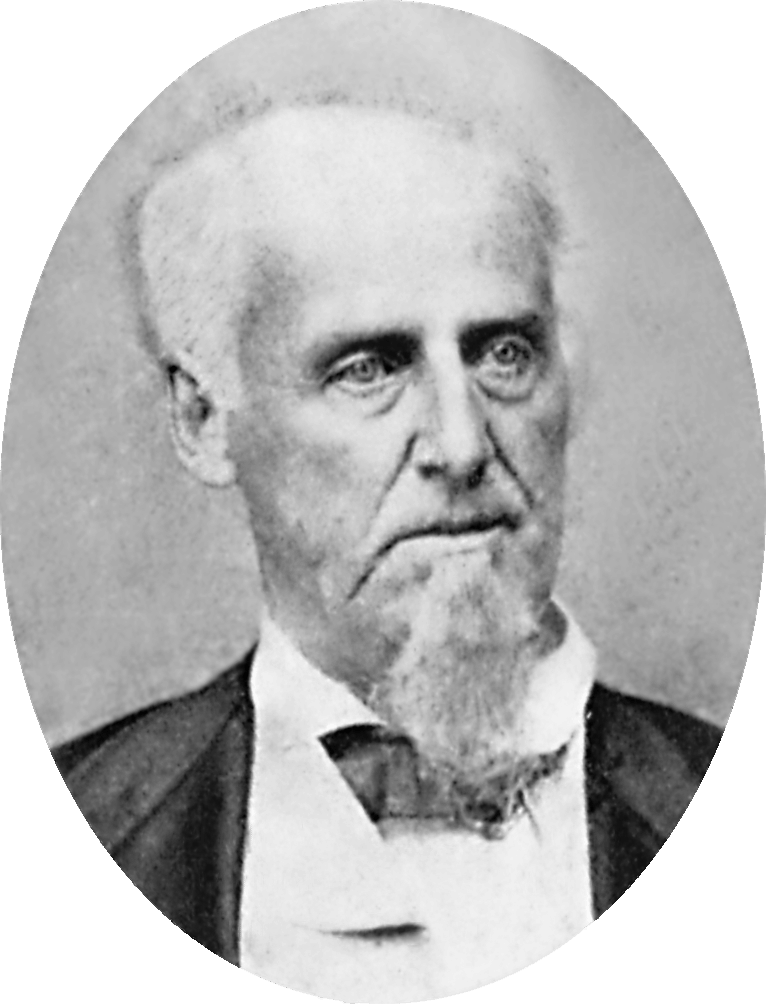

Justice of the Supreme Court of Minnesota Territory
- In office 1853–1857

Member of the New York State Assembly
- In office January 1, 1846 – December 31, 1846
- In office January 1, 1839 – December 31, 1841

Personal details
- Born: January 27, 1810 Butternuts, New York, U.S.
- Died: October 3, 1875 (aged 65) Belle Plaine, Minnesota, U.S.
- Resting place: Episcopal Church of the Transfiguration Cemetery, Belle Plaine, Minnesota, U.S.
- Spouse: Eunice Electa Clark Beeman (m. 1836)
- Children: 1
- Parent(s): Enos Chatfield; Hannah (Starr) Chatfield
- Relatives: Levi S. Chatfield (brother)
- Profession: Politician, lawyer

Andrew Gould Chatfield (January 27, 1810 – October 3, 1875) was an American lawyer and politician from New York and Minnesota.

== Life ==
He was the son of Enos Chatfield (1782–1858) and Hannah (Starr) Chatfield (1782–1857). He was born in that part of the Town of Butternuts which in 1849 was separated as the Town of Morris, in Otsego County, New York. In 1831, he began to study law at Painted Post, was admitted to the bar in 1833, and commenced practice in Addison, Steuben County, New York. On June 27, 1836, he married Eunice Electa Clark Beeman (1817–1901), and their daughter was Cecelia Annette "Celia" (Chatfield) Irwin (1837–1915).

He was a member of the New York State Assembly (Steuben Co.) in 1839, 1840, 1841 and 1846. On March 7, 1846, he was elected Speaker pro tempore, to preside over the Assembly during the absence of Speaker William C. Crain.

In 1848, he removed to Southport (now Kenosha, Wisconsin), and practiced law there. In 1850, he was elected Judge of Racine County, Wisconsin, but resigned after a short time in office.

In 1853, he was appointed by President Franklin Pierce as a justice of the Supreme Court of Minnesota Territory, and remained in office until 1857. In 1854, he founded the Town of Belle Plaine, in Scott County, Minnesota, and settled there.

In February 1863, Chatfield was appointed one of four Commissioners to Revise the Statutes of the State of Minnesota. In November 1870, he was elected Judge of the Eighth Judicial Circuit.

He died at Belle Plaine, and was buried there at the Episcopal Church of the Transfiguration Cemetery.

New York Attorney General Levi S. Chatfield was his brother.

Chatfield, Minnesota was named after Andrew G. Chatfield.

== Sources ==
- The New York Civil List compiled by Franklin Benjamin Hough (pages 222, 224f, 232 and 265; Weed, Parsons and Co., 1858)
- General and Special Laws of the State of Minnesota (1863; pg. 68f; "An Act to provide for the Revision of the Statutes of the State of Minnesota")
- Bio at Minnesota Legal History Project
