= William A. Moseley =

American politician

Member of the U.S. House of Representatives from New York's 32nd district
- In office March 4, 1843 – March 3, 1847
- Preceded by: Millard Fillmore
- Succeeded by: Nathan K. Hall

Personal details
- Born: William Abbott Moseley; October 20, 1798 Whitesboro, New York, U.S.
- Died: November 19, 1873 (aged 75) Fifth Avenue Hotel, New York City, U.S.
- Resting place: Forest Lawn Cemetery, Buffalo, New York, U.S.
- Party: Whig

William Abbott Moseley (October 20, 1798 – November 19, 1873) was an American physician, lawyer and politician from New York.

== Life ==
Moseley, son of Dr. Elizur Moseley, was born in Whitesboro, New York, in 1798. He graduated from Yale College in 1816. Then he studied medicine and practiced as a physician. He studied law at home, and began practice in Buffalo, New York in 1822.

In 1834 he was drawn into political life by being elected to the New York State Assembly (Erie Co.). He was a member of the New York State Senate (8th D.) from 1838 to 1841, sitting in the 61st, 62nd, 63rd and 64th New York State Legislatures. Believing his duties as Senator (and one of the Court of Appeals) somewhat incompatible with his professional employments, he relinquished his practice, which he did not again resume. Declining a re-election, he made an extended tour in Europe, and the week after his return (in 1842) was nominated for Congress. Moseley was elected as a Whig to the 28th and 29th United States Congresses, holding office from March 4, 1843, to March 3, 1847. Afterwards he resumed the practice of law.

He spent the rest his life in Buffalo and abroad, and died at the Fifth Avenue Hotel, New York City, November 19, 1873. He was buried at the Forest Lawn Cemetery, Buffalo.

He was twice married.

== Sources ==
This article incorporates public domain material from the Yale Obituary Record.

- United States Congress. "William A. Moseley (id: M001024)". Biographical Directory of the United States Congress.

U.S. House of Representatives
Preceded by Millard Fillmore	Member of the U.S. House of Representatives from New York's 32nd congressional district 1843–1847	Succeeded by Nathan K. Hall
