= James R. Lawrence =

American politician

James Robbins Lawrence (September 11, 1790 – March 21, 1874) was an American lawyer, politician, and judge from New York.

== Life ==
Lawrence was born on September 11, 1790, in Norfolk, Connecticut, the son of Grove Lawrence and Elizabeth Robbins.

Lawrence moved to Oneida County, New York, when he was five. He attended Hamilton College, graduating from there in 1810. He then began studying law with Medad Curtis in Onondaga Hill. After he was admitted to the bar, he moved to Camillus and began practicing law with his brother Grove. In 1840, he moved to Syracuse and practiced law there. At one point, he was a commissioned officer of the New York State militia and held the rank of Brigadier-General.

In 1824, Lawrence was elected to the New York State Assembly as one of representatives for Onondaga County and a member of the Clintonian faction. He served in the Assembly in 1825, 1838, 1839, and 1840. He was a prominent member of the Whig Party. Upon the adoption of the 1846 New York Constitution, he was elected County Judge of Onondaga County, resigning from the office in 1849. In September 1850, President Fillmore appointed him United States Attorney for the Northern District of New York. He joined the Republican Party once it was formed. In the last seven years of his life, he was blind.

Lawrence was a member of the Presbyterian Church. In 1810, he married Christine McLaren of Edinburgh, Scotland. Their children were Elizabeth, Margaret, James Robbins, Christine, Irene Battell, and Sarah Urania. His wife Christine died in 1835, and in 1841 he married his second wife, Eureka Spofford. Their children were Eureka Spofford, William Horatio, and Mary Florida.

Lawrence died in Syracuse from lung congestion on March 21, 1874.

Legal offices
Preceded by George W. Clinton	United States Attorney for the Northern District of New York; 1850–1853	Succeeded by Samuel B. Garvin
