= Micah Sterling =

American politician

Member of the U.S. House of Representatives from New York's 18th district
- In office December 3, 1821 – March 3, 1823
- Preceded by: William Donnison Ford
- Succeeded by: Henry C. Martindale

Member of the New York Senate from the 5th district
- In office January 1, 1836 – December 31, 1839
- Preceded by: Robert Lansing
- Succeeded by: Sumner Ely

Personal details
- Born: November 5, 1784 Lyme, Connecticut, U.S.
- Died: April 11, 1844 (aged 59) Watertown, New York, U.S.
- Party: Federalist
- Education: Yale College; Litchfield Law School

Micah Sterling (November 5, 1784 – April 11, 1844) was an American lawyer and politician from New York.

== Life ==
Sterling graduated from Yale College in 1804. Then he studied law at Litchfield Law School, was admitted to the bar in 1809, and commenced practice in Adams, New York, but the same year removed to Watertown and continued the practice of law there. He married Betsey Bronson (1795–1831), and they had five children of whom only John C. Sterling (1820–1903) survived infancy.

Micah Sterling was Treasurer of the Village of Watertown in 1816, and was a director of the Jefferson County Bank. He was elected as a Federalist to the 17th United States Congress, holding office from December 3, 1821, to March 3, 1823. Afterwards he resumed the practice of law.

After the death of his first wife, he married Ruth Benedict (1801–1870), and their son was Lewis Benedict Sterling (1836–1899). Micah Sterling was a member of the New York State Senate (5th D.) from 1836 to 1839, sitting in the 59th, 60th, 61st and 62nd New York State Legislatures.

He died of scarlet fever on April 11, 1844, the same day as Egbert Ten Eyck who had succeeded him in Congress, and both were buried at the Brookside Cemetery in Watertown.

Congressman Ansel Sterling was his brother.

U.S. House of Representatives
Preceded by William Donnison Ford	Member of the U.S. House of Representatives from New York's 18th congressional district 1821–1823	Succeeded by Henry C. Martindale
New York State Senate
Preceded by Robert Lansing	New York State Senate; Fifth District (Class 1); 1836–1839	Succeeded by Sumner Ely
