= Thomas Phoenix =

Thomas Phoenix was an American lawyer and politician from New York.

== Name ==
The family name Phoenix, sometimes spelled Phœnix, derives from the homophonous English family name Fenwicks which is pronounced like FENN-ix. (This is quite different from the Greek mythological bird and the Arizona state capital which are pronounced like FEE-nix.) The Fenwicks resided originally at the Fenwick Tower in Northumberland.

== Life ==
Phoenix graduated A.B. from Columbia College in 1795. He was admitted to the bar in 1798.

He was New York County District Attorney from 1835 to 1838. In 1836, he prosecuted Richard P. Robinson for the murder of Helen Jewett, but lost the case to Ogden Hoffman, his predecessor in the D.A's office, who appeared for the defence and secured Robinson's acquittal.

== Sources ==
- Prominent Families of New York (page 309)
- Catalogue of Officers and Graduates issued by Columbia College (page 47)
- Proceedings of the Board of Supervisors (1839, pages 653ff; with a report on his accounts as D.A.)
- Documents of the Board of Aldermen (1841–42, Vol. VIII, page 29, rejecting his claim for extra compensation as D.A.)
- The New York Civil List compiled by Franklin Benjamin Hough (page 377; Weed, Parsons and Co., 1858)

Legal offices
Preceded by Ogden Hoffman	New York County District Attorney; 1835–1838	Succeeded by James R. Whiting
