= Abijah Beckwith (New York politician) =

American politician

Abijah Beckwith (December 2, 1784, in Chatham, Columbia County, New York – August 8, 1874, in Cedarville, Herkimer County, New York) was an American politician from New York. He served several stints in the New York State Assembly in the early to mid-19th century.

== Life ==
He was the son of Dan Beckwith and Ann (Hough) Beckwith. In 1805, he married Lurena Chadwick (1785–1857), and they had 9 children. About 1806, the family removed to a place in Herkimer County which in 1812 became part of the Town of Columbia.

=== State assembly ===
Beckwith was a member of the New York State Assembly (Herkimer Co.) in 1816–17 and 1823. He was Clerk of Herkimer County from 1826 to 1831.

He was a Democratic member of the New York State Senate (5th D.) from 1835 to 1838, sitting in the 58th through 61st New York State Legislatures.

He was again a member of the State Assembly (Herkimer Co.) in 1847. In 1848, he became a Free Soiler and later a Republican.

In the 1860 presidential election, he was a presidential elector for Abraham Lincoln and Hannibal Hamiln.

=== Death and burial ===
Beckwith died on August 8, 1874, and was buried at the Cemetery in Cedarville.

== See also ==
- List of New York state senators

== Sources ==
- The New York Civil List compiled by Franklin Benjamin Hough (pages 130ff, 138, 192, 199, 233, 258 and 389; Weed, Parsons and Co., 1858)
- Portrait in Jacksonian Antislavery and the Politics of Free Soil, 1824 to 1854 by Jonathan H. Earle (University of North Carolina Press, 2004; pg. 11)
- Cedarville Cemetery Records at New Horizons Genealogy
- Beckwith genealogy at Geo Cities

New York State Senate
Preceded by Henry A. Foster	New York State Senate; Fifth District (Class 4); 1835–1838	Succeeded by Joseph Clark
