= Martin Lee (New York politician) =

American politician

Martin Lee was an American lawyer and politician from New York.

== Life ==
He was the son of Rev. Andrew Lee D.D. (1745–1832) and Eunice (Hall) Lee (d. 1800). He married Anna Wendell, daughter of State Senator Gerrit Wendell, and they had eleven children.

He was Supervisor of the Town of Granville from 1820 to 1822; and a member of the New York State Assembly (Washington Co.) in 1823.

He was a member of the New York State Senate (4th D.) from 1838 to 1841, sitting in the 61st, 62nd, 63rd and 64th New York State Legislatures.

He was the Judge of the Washington County Court from 1847 to 1851.

== Sources ==
- The New York Civil List compiled by Franklin Benjamin Hough (pages 131ff, 143, 200, 287 and 365; Weed, Parsons and Co., 1858)
- Lee genealogy

New York State Senate
Preceded by John McLean Jr.	New York State Senate; Fourth District (Class 3); 1838–1841	Succeeded by Edmund Varney
