= Abraham L. Lawyer =

American politician

Abraham L. Lawyer (1792–1853) was an American politician from New York.

== Life ==
He lived in Cobleskill.

He was a member of the New York State Assembly (Schoharie Co.) in 1830.

He was a member of the New York State Senate (3rd D.) from 1835 to 1838, sitting in the 58th, 59th, 60th and 61st New York State Legislatures.

He was again a member of the State Assembly (Schoharie Co., 2nd D.) in 1851.

== Sources ==
- The New York Civil List compiled by Franklin Benjamin Hough (pages 130f, 142, 210, 242 and 287; Weed, Parsons and Co., 1858)
- American Ancestry (pg. 48)

New York State Senate
Preceded by Herman I. Quackenboss	New York State Senate; Third District (Class 4); 1835–1838	Succeeded by Alonzo C. Paige
New York State Assembly
Preceded by John Avery	New York State Assembly; Scholarie County, 2nd District; 1851	Succeeded by James Ostertout
