= Senator Dennison =

Senator Dennison may refer to:

- William Dennison Jr. (1815–1882), Ohio State Senate
- Robert Denniston (1800–1867), New York State Senate
