= Sumner Ely =

American politician

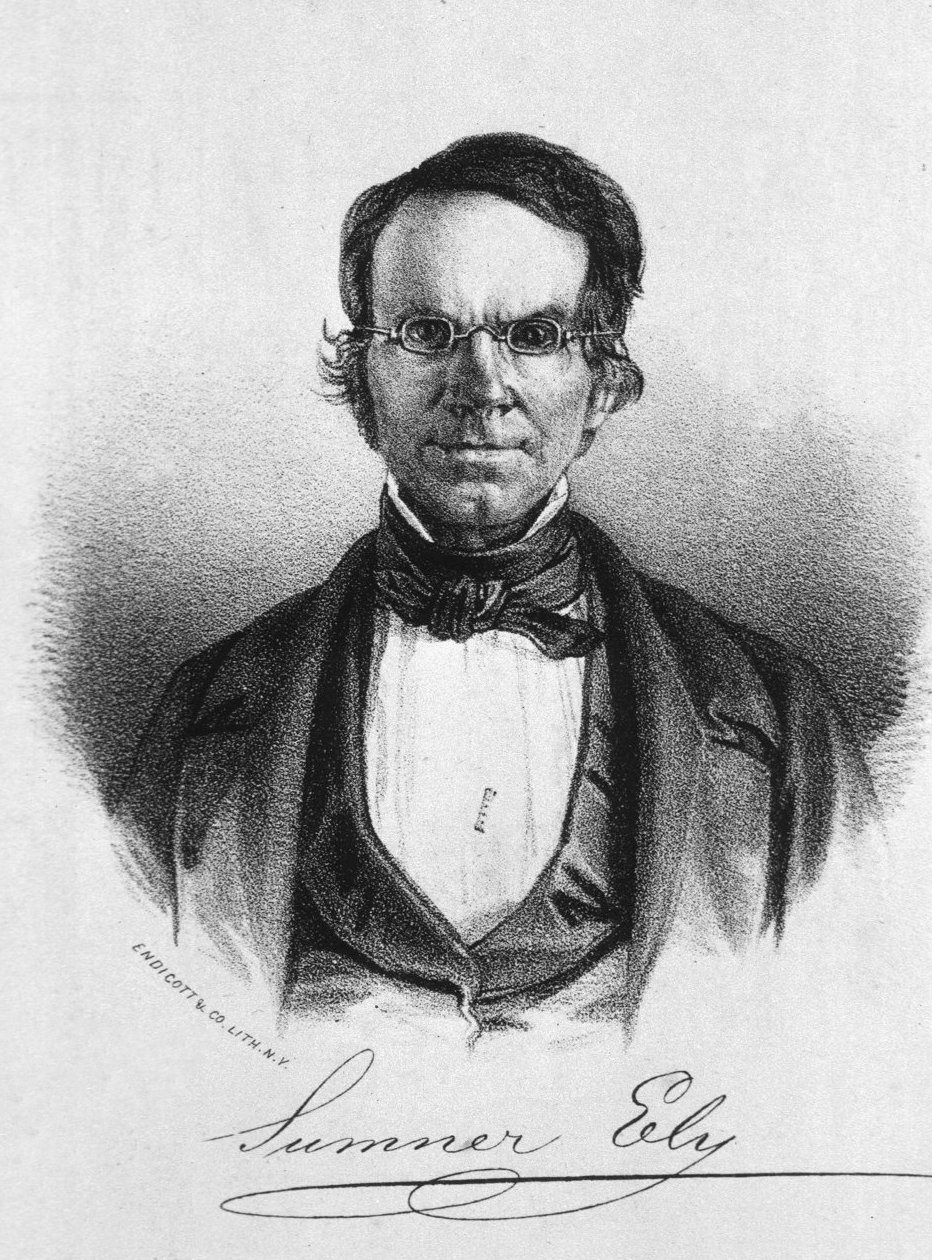
Sumner Ely

Sumner Ely (May 22, 1787 in Lyme, New London County, Connecticut – February 3, 1857) was an American medical doctor and politician from New York.

== Life ==
He was the son of Adriel Ely and Sarah (Stowe) Ely. He graduated from Yale College in 1804. Then he studied medicine with Dr. Thomas Broadhead at Clermont, New York, and was licensed to practice in 1809. In 1810, he removed to Middlefield, New York, and practiced medicine there. On June 11, 1816, he married Hannah Knapp Gilbert (1791–1868), and they had five sons, among them Assemblyman William H. Ely (b. 1829).

Sumner Ely was Postmaster of Middlefield and a brigadier general of the New York State Militia.

He was a member of the New York State Assembly (Otsego Co.) in 1836.

He was a Democratic member of the New York State Senate (5th D.) from 1840 to 1843, sitting in the 63rd, 64th, 65th and 66th New York State Legislatures.

== Sources ==
- The New York Civil List compiled by Franklin Benjamin Hough (pages 132ff, 140, 218 and 272; Weed, Parsons and Co., 1858)
- Table of the Post Offices in the United States (1836; pg. 97)
- The New York Annual Register for the Year of 1831 (pg. 287)
- Biographical Sketch of the late Sumner Ely M.D. in Transactions of the Medical Society of the State of New York (Albany, 1858; pg. 23–34)

New York State Senate
Preceded by Micah Sterling	New York State Senate; Fifth District (Class 1); 1840–1843	Succeeded by Thomas Barlow
