= William Donnison Ford =

American politician

Member of the U.S. House of Representatives from New York's 18th district
- In office March 4, 1819 – March 3, 1821
- Preceded by: David A. Ogden
- Succeeded by: Micah Sterling

Personal details
- Born: October 31, 1779 Providence, Rhode Island, U.S.
- Died: October 1, 1833 (aged 53) Sackets Harbor, New York, U.S.

William Donnison Ford (October 31, 1779 – October 1, 1833) was an American lawyer and politician from New York.

== Life ==
Ford's family moved to western New York in the 1780s. He attended Fairfield Seminary, studied law with Gaylord Griswold and Simeon Ford, was admitted to the bar in 1809, and commenced practice in Fairfield.

He was a member of the New York State Assembly from Herkimer County in 1816 and 1817. In 1817 he moved to Watertown, New York, where he practiced law and served as a state commissioner of bankruptcy.

Ford was elected as a Democratic-Republican to the Sixteenth United States Congress, holding office from March 4, 1819, to March 3, 1821. Afterwards he resumed the practice of law, and also served in the judicial position of Master in Chancery. He was a Trustee of the Village of Watertown in 1827 and also served as District Attorney of Jefferson County.

He moved to Sackets Harbor in 1830, and died there on October 1, 1833. He was buried at Lakeside Cemetery in Sackets Harbor.

U.S. House of Representatives
Preceded by David A. Ogden	Member of the U.S. House of Representatives from New York's 18th congressional district 1819–1821	Succeeded by Micah Sterling
