= Bethuel Peck =

American politician

- Born: June 16, 1788; Sand Lake, New York
- Died: July 11, 1862 (aged 74)
- Occupations: Medical doctor and politician

Bethuel Peck (June 16, 1788 – July 11, 1862) was an American medical doctor and politician from New York.

== Life ==
He was the son of Daniel Peck (1754–1840) and Mehitable (Harvey) Peck (d. 1826), and was born in an area which in 1812 became part of the Town of Sand Lake, in Rensselaer County, New York. He married Jerusha Wiston, and their only daughter died in infancy.

He practiced medicine in Glens Falls, New York, and ran a drugstore there with Billy J. Clark.

He was a member of the New York State Senate (4th D.) from 1839 to 1842, sitting in the 62nd, 63rd, 64th and 65th New York State Legislatures.

He was President of the Dividend Mutual Insurance Company, of Glens Falls.

== Sources ==
- The New York Civil List compiled by Franklin Benjamin Hough (pages 132f and 144; Weed, Parsons and Co., 1858)
- A Genealogical History of the Descendants of Joseph Peck by Ira B. Peck (Boston, 1868; pg. 46, 56 and 82)
- History of Warren County by H. P. Smith, transcription at RootsWeb

New York State Senate
Preceded by Jabez Willes	New York State Senate; Fourth District (Class 4); 1839–1842	Succeeded by Thomas B. Mitchell
