= James R. Whiting =

American judge

James Raynor Whiting (April 30, 1803 – March 16, 1872) was an American lawyer and politician from New York.

== Life ==
He was New York County District Attorney from 1838 to 1844. In 1842 as District Attorney, he prosecuted John C. Colt for the murder of Samuel Adams.

In November 1855, he was elected on the Democratic ticket a justice of the New York Supreme Court, and took office on January 1, 1856, but resigned the following year. In November 1857, Josiah Sutherland was elected to fill the vacancy.

In November 1856, Whiting ran on a Reform ticket for Mayor of New York City, but he and four other candidates were defeated by Fernando Wood.

Whiting also owned and developed real estate. For example, he once owned the Broadway Theatre, demolished it, and replaced it with a modern textile showroom.

He was buried at the Woodlawn Cemetery (Bronx).

Legal offices
Preceded by Thomas Phoenix	New York County District Attorney; 1838–1844	Succeeded by Matthew C. Paterson
