= Billy J. Clark =

American politician

Billy James Clark (January 4, 1778 in Northampton, Hampshire County, Massachusetts – September 20, 1866) was an American medical doctor and politician from New York.

== Life ==
He was the son of Ithamar Clark and Sarah (Simonds) Clark. He grew up in Pownal, Vermont. Later he removed to Moreau, New York, and practiced medicine there. In 1808, he organized the first temperance society of the United States. He was a member of the New York State Assembly (Saratoga Co.) in 1820. In 1833, he removed to Glens Falls, and opened a drugstore there with Bethuel Peck. He was a presidential elector in 1848, voting for Zachary Taylor and Millard Fillmore.

== Sources ==
- The New York Civil List compiled by Franklin Benjamin Hough (pages 196, 265, and 331; Weed, Parsons and Co., 1858)
- Glens Falls: People and Places by Bob Bayle, Lillian Casola, Stan Malecki & Gwen Palmer ("Images of America" series; Arcadia Publishing, 2008; pg. 61)
- History of Warren County by H. P. Smith, transcription at RootsWeb
