= Avery Skinner =

American politician

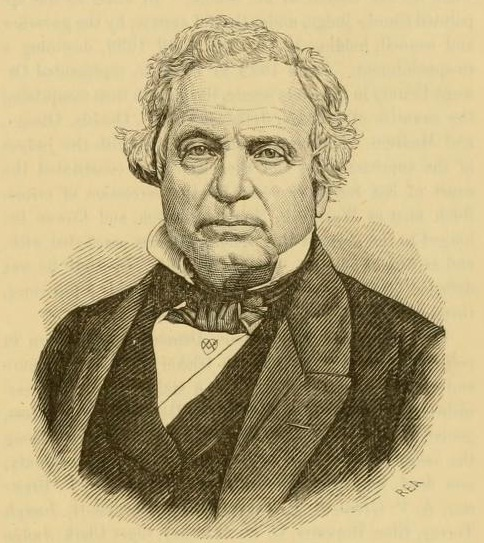
Avery Skinner

Avery Skinner (June 9, 1796 – November 24, 1876) was an American politician from New York.

== Life ==
He was born on June 9, 1796, in Westmoreland, Cheshire County, New Hampshire, the son of Timothy Skinner and Ruth (Warner) Skinner. In 1816, he removed to Watertown, New York. On June 9, 1822, he married Elizabeth Lathrop Huntington (1802–1833), and they had four children. In 1823, the family moved to a place which Skinner named Union Square (now a hamlet called Maple View), in the town of Mexico. Skinner built, and then kept, an inn at Union Square. From 1826 to 1837, he was Treasurer of Oswego County. From 1828 to 1839, he was an associate judge of the Oswego County Court.

He was a member of the New York State Assembly (Oswego Co.) in 1832 and 1833. He was Postmaster of Union Square from 1833 until his death, with a short interruption of three months.

On September 1, 1834, he married Charlotte Prior Stebbins (1802–1888), and they had five children, among them Congressman Charles R. Skinner (1844–1928).

Avery Skinner was a member of the New York State Senate (5th D.) from 1838 to 1841, sitting in the 61st, 62nd, 63rd and 64th New York State Legislatures.

He died on November 24, 1876, in Mexico, Oswego County, New York; and was buried at the Maple View Cemetery there.

State Senator Alanson Skinner (1794–1876) was his brother.

== Sources ==
- The New York Civil List compiled by Franklin Benjamin Hough (pages 132f, 145, 212, 214 and 304; Weed, Parsons and Co., 1858)
- Skinner genealogy at Family Tree Maker

New York State Assembly
Preceded by Joel Turrill	New York State Assembly; Oswego Co. 1832–1833	Succeeded by Orville Robinson
New York State Senate
Preceded by Francis Seger	New York State Senate; Fifth District (Class 3); 1838–1841	Succeeded by William Ruger
