= 1842 New York gubernatorial election =

- November 8, 1842
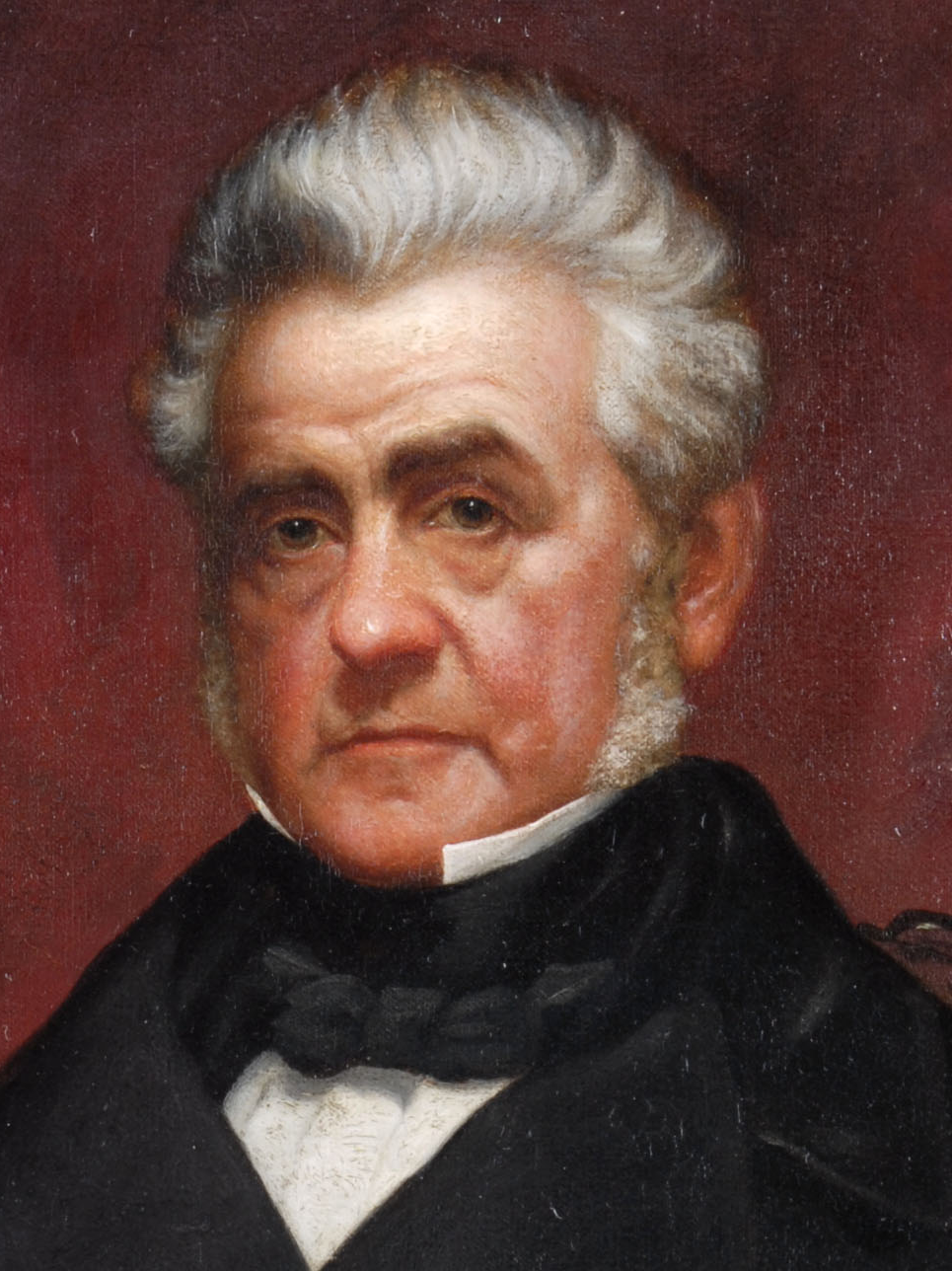

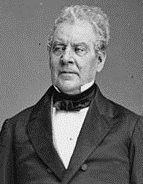
| Nominee | William C. Bouck | Luther Bradish |
| Party | Democratic | Whig |
| Popular vote | 208,072 | 186,091 |
| Percentage | 51.83% | 46.36% |
County Results
Bouck
40–50%
50–60%
60–70%
70–80%
Bradish
40–50%
50–60%
60–70%
No Data/Vote
Governor before election
William H. Seward
Whig
Elected Governor
William C. Bouck
Democratic

The 1842 New York gubernatorial election was held on November 8, 1842, to elect the Governor and Lieutenant Governor of New York.

== Background ==
This was the first gubernatorial election in New York which was held on a single day. Until 1841, the State elections had been held during three days beginning on the first Monday in November. In 1842, the State Legislature fixed the election day permanently on the Tuesday next after the first Monday in November.

== General election ==
=== Candidates ===
- William C. Bouck, former member of the Erie Canal Commission and nominee for Governor in 1840 (Democratic)
- Luther Bradish, incumbent Lieutenant Governor (Whig)
- Alvan Stewart (Liberty)

The Democratic Party nominated former Erie Canal Commissioner William C. Bouck. They nominated former state senator Daniel S. Dickinson for Lieutenant Governor.

The Whig Party nominated Lieutenant Governor Luther Bradish. They nominated state senator Gabriel Furman for Lieutenant Governor.

The Liberty Party nominated Alvan Stewart. They nominated Charles O. Shepard for Lieutenant Governor.

=== Results ===
The Democratic ticket of Bouck and Dickinson was elected.

1842 New York gubernatorial election
| Party | Candidate | Votes | % |
|---|---|---|---|
| Democratic | William C. Bouck | 208,072 | 51.83% |
| Whig | Luther Bradish | 186,091 | 46.36% |
| Liberty | Alvan Stewart | 7,263 | 1.81% |
| Total votes | | 401,426 | 100% |

== Sources ==
- Result: The Tribune Almanac 1843
