= Abram Dixon =

American politician

Abram Dixon (July 23, 1787, in Manchester, Bennington County, Vermont Republic – April 19, 1875, in Westfield, Chautauqua County, New York) was an American lawyer and politician from New York.

== Life ==
He was the son of Joseph Dixon (1754–1839) and Mercy (Raymond) Dixon (1761–1847). Around 1795, the family moved to Sherburne, Chenango County, New York. He attended Hamilton-Oneida Academy, and graduated from Yale College in 1813. He then studied law at Hamilton, Madison County, New York. On August 29, 1817, he married Caroline Pelton (1798–1837), and they had three children. The newly-wed couple settled at Westfield, and Dixon practiced law there.

Around 1840, he married Eliza Williams (Holt) Higgins (c. 1805–1858), and they had two children.

He was a Whig member of the New York State Senate (4th D.) from 1840 to 1843, sitting in the 63rd, 64th, 65th and 66th New York State Legislatures.

In November 1867, he was elected a special surrogate of Chautauqua County.

== Sources ==
- The New York Civil List compiled by Franklin Benjamin Hough (pages 132ff and 140; Weed, Parsons and Co., 1858)
- Death notice of his wife in Annual Obituary Notices of Eminent Persons by Nathan Crosby (Boston, 1859; pg. 90)
- Manual for the Use of the Legislature (1870; pg. 241)

New York State Senate
Preceded by Chauncey J. Fox	New York State Senate; Eighth District (Class 1); 1840–1843	Succeeded by Frederick F. Backus
