= Jesse Crowell =

American politician

Jesse Crowell (November 19, 1797 Bridgewater, Oneida County, New York – September 28, 1872 Albion, Calhoun County, Michigan) was a pioneer settler in Michigan, who platted Albion, Michigan, in 1836, was its first postmaster, and played an important role in the public affairs and the development of Albion. He is renowned as Albion's Greatest Benefactor.

== Life ==
His parents died when he was young. He removed to Albion, Oswego County, New York. He was a member of the New York State Assembly (Oswego Co.) in 1835.

Crowell came to Albion in 1835 with the intention to find water power and build a mill. He found the site at the forks of the Kalamazoo River.

Crowell was the main organizer, along with fellow pioneer settlers Tenney Peabody, Issachor Frost and D. L. Bacon, of the Albion Company - a firm which laid the plat for the town in 1836. In 1837, he negotiated for a post office and became the first postmaster. Through the Albion Company, Crowell sold property to other early settlers, donated land to establish churches, and established the Albion Burying Ground - later to become Riverside Cemetery. In 1838, he donated 60 acres (240,000 m^{2}) of land and an additional 3 block for the Wesleyan Female Seminary, which later became Albion College. In its first years, Crowell served on the school's board of directors and contributed liberally to the institution.

Crowell operated his Stone Mill from 1845 until his death, exporting products throughout the country. In 1917 this building was converted for use as a bank, removing the upper story, and applying a neoclassical front on the Superior St facade. The south wall of the Stone Mill may still be seen to this day.

He never married and had no children.

Crowell is associated with many places in Albion. Crowell's Michigan Avenue home was purchased by Dr. Stephen Munroe in 1873. A retired physician, Munroe added a mansard roof and third floor to the structure. The family of Albion State Bank president David A. Garfield were the final residents of the house. Mrs. Garfield was the niece of Dr. Munroe. The Garfield's lived there until the house was demolished in 1926 to make way for Wesley Hall, a girls' dormitory for Albion College, later expanded for the use of all Albion College freshmen.

Crowell Park is located on North Superior Street. Named Washington Square in the original 1836 plat map and later known as Washington Park, this park was at one time extensively landscaped. Albion's water tower is located on this hill-top location. In the center of the park is the cornerstone from Crowell's stone mill.

Crowell School was named in his honor and opened in 1955 in the northwest corner of town. Because of declining student enrollment, this elementary school was converted for use as administrative offices in 2004.

Finally, the Crowell Block (303-307 Superior) in the Superior Street National Commercial Historic District downtown (listed on the National Register of Historic Places), was built by Crowell (c.1858) and was part of a row of three story commercial buildings between the Albion Opera House and the Brockway block on the corner of Superior and Erie.
