= Levi S. Chatfield =

American politician

Levi Starr Chatfield (March 7, 1808 – August 4, 1884) was an American lawyer and politician.

== Life ==
He was the son of Enos Chatfield (1782–1858) and Hannah (Starr) Chatfield (1782–1857). He was born in that part of the Town of Butternuts which in 1849 was separated as the Town of Morris, in Otsego County, New York.

When the Village of Laurens was incorporated in 1834, he was chosen its first Town Clerk.

He was a member of the New York State Assembly (Otsego Co.) in 1839, 1840, 1841 and 1842, and was Speaker in 1842.

He was one of the first trustees of the Presbyterian church of Laurens when it was organized on January 16, 1844.

He was a delegate to the New York State Constitutional Convention in 1846.

In 1847, he ran for Attorney General on the Democratic ticket, but was defeated by Whig/Anti-Rent candidate Ambrose L. Jordan. In 1849, he was elected New York State Attorney General, and re-elected in 1851. He was in office from 1850 to 1853 when he resigned three weeks before the end of the term.

In 1853-54, he was the major stockholder of the Atlantic and Pacific Railroad.

In 1869, he appeared for the plaintiff David Groesbeck in a suit against the Trinity Church "incorporators".

In 1871, he married Elizabeth C. Browne (1843–1917).

Minnesota Supreme Court Justice Andrew G. Chatfield (1810–1875) was his brother.

== Sources ==
- His argument in the Trinity Church Suit, in NYT on June 13, 1869
- Political Graveyard
- Short mention
- "Disclosures" about the A&P Railroad, NYT June 15, 1854
- Church history at Rootsweb
- Officers of Laurens Village at NY History
- Resignation of NYSAG Carmody, mentioning Chatfield, in NYT on July 21, 1914
- The Selected Papers of Elizabeth Cady Stanton and Susan B. Anthony (page 167; Rutgers University Press, ISBN 0-8135-2318-4, ISBN 978-0-8135-2318-7 )

Political offices
| Preceded by Peter B. Porter, Jr. | Speaker of the New York State Assembly; 1842 | Succeeded by George R. Davis |
Legal offices
| Preceded by Ambrose L. Jordan | New York State Attorney General; 1850–1853 | Succeeded by Gardner Stow |
