= Mitchell Sanford =

American politician

Mitchell Sanford (February 24, 1799 in Greenville, Greene County, New York – March 29, 1861 in Brooklyn, Kings County, New York) was an American lawyer and politician from New York.

== Life ==
On September 27, 1823, he married Sarah Wells (1804–1878), and they had three children.

He was a member of the New York State Assembly (Schoharie Co.) in 1838.

He was a Whig member of the New York State Senate (3rd D.) in 1840.

In March 1861, Sanford was retained to defend Assemblyman Jay Gibbons at the latter's trial before the Assembly on charges of bribery, but Sanford died unexpectedly.

He and his wife were buried at the Greenville Cemetery.

== Sources ==
- The New York Civil List compiled by Franklin Benjamin Hough (pages 132, 145, 221 and 301; Weed, Parsons and Co., 1858)
- Journal of the Assembly (84th Session) (1861; pg. 757 and 774)
- Tombstone transcriptions from Greenville Cemetery, at RootsWeb

New York State Senate
Preceded by Noadiah Johnson	New York State Senate; Third District (Class 2); 1840	Succeeded by Henry W. Strong
