= Robert McKinstry =

Northern Irish architect

Robert McKinstry OBE, ARIBA
- Born: 15 January 1925; Banbridge, County Down
- Died: 29 October 2012 (aged 87)
- Education: Liverpool University
- Known for: Architectural design and conservation
- Spouse: Cherith McKinstry

Robert McKinstry OBE, ARIBA (15 January 1925 – 29 October 2012) was a Northern Irish architect who specialised in conservation and restoration work. McKinstry worked on many prestigious projects including the restoration of St Anne's Cathedral, the Crown Liquor Saloon, the Arts Council of Northern Ireland Gallery, and the Grand Opera House, Belfast.

== Biography ==
Robert James McKinstry was born in Banbridge, County Down to John 'Gar' McKinstry, a manager of a local linen business, and his Dublin born wife Mabel 'May' McConnell. McKinstry attended Banbridge Academy where his artistic talents were nurtured by Mercy Hunter, with whom he retained a friendship for the remainder of his life. He later went on to study at Portora Royal School in Enniskillen. McKinstry studied architecture at Liverpool University School of Architecture. At University McKinstry found an interest in amateur dramatics, and the theatre, an interest which he maintained throughout his life. A travel scholarship enabled McKinstry study European theatre architecture at the offices of Pierre Sonrel for a year, before he returned to London. At the age of seventeen McKinstry sought out and visited the poet Richard Rowley at his Newcastle home, where he was well received and spent a considerable time discussing poetry, the linen industry, the artist George MacCann and the Group Theatre.

McKinstry accompanied John Boyd and Cathal McCrystal on the first Irish cultural delegation to visit the USSR in 1955. McKinstry worked with Henry Lynch-Robinson for a few years before he established his own architectural practice in Belfast in 1956. McKinstry also lectured at the Belfast School of Art where he met his wife, Cherith Boyd, an art student whom he married in 1958. Amongst his other students were the artists TP Flanagan and Desmond Kinney. McKinstry later went into partnership with Melvyn Brown.

In 1957 McKinstry won the contract to design the new swimming pool at his old school, Portora Royal in Enniskillen. In the summer of the same year McKinstry joined with the artist Tom Carr to open Belfast's first private gallery, the Piccolo Gallery, to promote the work of young local artists. The gallery was taken over by the Council for the Encouragement for Music and the Arts in January 1958. McKinstry also designed the new Rathcoole Presbyterian Church which opened in 1957 and featured reversible seating and a stage. In 1960 the Belfast Arts Theatre Trust appointed McKinstry as honorary consultant architect for interior design aspect in their new building, the first public theatre to be built in Belfast for fifty years. In May of the same year McKinstry was responsible for the interior design aspect of CEMA's new basement gallery on Chichester Street, Belfast. When, in 1968 CEMA's successor the Arts Council of Northern Ireland found a new gallery space on Bedford Street in the City, McKinstry was once again appointed architect. His designs included huge moveable partitions and sliding screens that allowed for a flexible exhibition space and received much international acclaim.

In 1968 he bought a historic Georgian mansion at Chrome Hill, Lambeg in Lisburn. He restored the house and built a studio for his artist wife. In 1971 he was the architectural co-ordinator for the Ulster '71 exhibition at the Ulster Museum. McKinstry completed a two-year restoration of the Shambles Art Gallery in Hillsborough, County Down in 1971 at the behest of the artist Patric Stevenson whom had used the old stables for exhibiting for a number of years until they had deteriorated to such an extent that they could no longer be safely used. McKinstry was awarded the contract to renew the Grand Opera House in Belfast in 1978. The restoration took four years and included a full modernisation of the backstage areas, a larger orchestra pit and a new fly tower, in addition to improved lighting. McKinstry wrote extensively on architecture and in 1971 his essay Contemporary Architecture was included in the Arts Council of Northern Ireland's publication Causeway; the Arts in Ulster. McKinstry contributed a chapter on the Grand Opera House to a biography of Frank Matchett Theatre Architect republished to celebrate the restoration of Belfast's landmark theatre in 1981.

The Ulster New Zealand Trust began renovating Ballance House, Glenavy in 1990, when the appointed architects were Kennedy & Fitzgerald with McKinstry serving as advisor. McKinstry was later invited to curate an exhibition showing works from sons and daughters of noted Ulster artists and architects at Ballance House in 1998.

McKinstry was appointed chairman of the Northern Ireland Buildings Centre in 1963, a position he was to hold until 1968. McKinstry was also a member of the Arts Council of Northern Ireland, and a former consultant architect to the National Trust from 1971 until 1983. He was a past president of the Royal Society of Ulster Architects from 1967 to 1969. McKinstry won many awards throughout his career including a Civic Trust Award for his restoration of the Grand Opera House. In 1995 he was appointed to the Order of the British Empire for his services to architecture.

== Death and legacy ==
Robert McKinstry died on 29 October 2012. He was survived by three sons. His wife pre-deceased him by eight years. The Historic Environment Record of Northern Ireland holds 2,200 McKinstry drawings in their collection.
