= Gardner Stow =

American politician

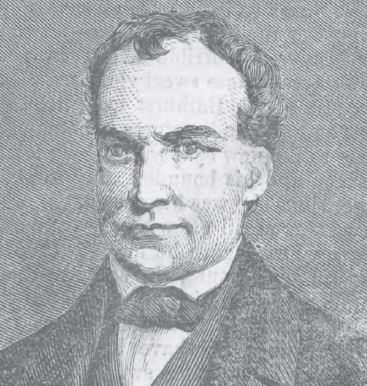
From the April 6, 1867 issue of Harper's Weekly

Gardner Stow (August 1789 – June 25, 1866) was an American lawyer and politician who served as New York State Attorney General.

== Early life ==
He was born in Orange, Franklin County, Massachusetts, the son of Timothy Stow and Mary (Kendall) Stow. The family moved first to Warrensburg, and in 1802 to Bolton. In 1806, he moved to Sandy Hill, New York to study law with Roswell Weston. There, he met fellow students Silas Wright, Zebulon R. Shipherd, and Esek Cowen, who were studying with Roger Skinner. When Cowen was admitted to the bar and began practice, Stow continued his studies at the office of Gansevoort and Cowen in Gansevoort's Mills, Saratoga County, New York. He was admitted to the bar in 1811 and practiced with Cowen in Northumberland before later relocating to Elizabethtown.

== Military service ==
Stow served in the War of 1812 as a member of two different units of the New York Militia: a company commanded by John Calkins of Elizabethtown and a regiment commanded by Ransom Noble of Essex. He held the ranks of corporal in the company and sergeant major in the regiment.

Stow remained in the militia after the war. In 1819, he was appointed Judge Advocate of the 40th Brigade; later that year, he was appointed adjutant of the 37th Regiment.

== Early career ==
Stow was active in politics and government throughout his career. He began as a Federalist member, then joined the Democratic-Republican, and later the Democrat. He served as a justice of the peace starting in 1813, was Elizabethtown's Postmaster, and also served terms as Essex County Treasurer.

== Temperance advocate ==
In 1808, Stow was a co-founder of the Moreau and Northumberland Temperance Society, the first such society organized in New York State. In 1834, in an address delivered before a Temperance Society in Keeseville, he was described as "the first man to advocate legislation to prohibit all traffic in intoxicating liquor, as a beverage." Newspaper articles in 1858 noted that four members of the original Moreau and Northumberland temperance society were still living, including Stow, and that he had advocated for temperance throughout his career.

== Later career ==
Stow later moved to Keeseville, New York, and served as District Attorney of Essex County from 1838 to 1844. During the session of the In 1840, he was an unsuccessful Democratic candidate for the New York State Senate. In the 1840s, he also performed court-related duties as commissioner in bankruptcy, master in chancery, and examiner in chancery.

In 1845, Stow moved to Troy, New York, where he continued his law practice. After the resignation of Levi S. Chatfield, Governor Horatio Seymour appointed him New York State Attorney General on December 8, 1853, to fill the vacancy until the end of the year.

== Death ==
He died in Troy on June 25, 1866.

== Family ==
Stow's first wife, Charlotte, died young. In 1831, Stow married Sophia Patrick of Windsor, Vermont.

His daughter, Evelina Charlotte Stow (1812–1839), married Sewall Sylvester Cutting (1813–1882) in 1836. Their only son was Gardner Stow Cutting (1838–1883).

== Sources ==
- Gardner Stow at Political Graveyard
- Marriage notice Danville, Vermont North Star, at Rootsweb
- The New York State Register for 1843 edited by O. L. Holley, page 373, (J. Disturnell, Albany NY, 1843)
- The New York State Register for 1847 edited by Orville Luther Holley, page 83, (J. Disturnell, New York NY, 1847)
- The New York Civil List compiled by Franklin Benjamin Hough (Weed, Parsons and Co., 1858)
- Obituary of Sewall S. Cutting, in New York Times on February 8, 1882 (giving wrong middle initial "H." for his older son)

Legal offices
Preceded by Levi S. Chatfield	New York State Attorney General; 1853	Succeeded by Ogden Hoffman
