= William A. Bird =

State legislator in Florida

William A. Bird, last name sometimes spelled Byrd, was a Christian minister and state legislator in Florida. He represented Jefferson County, Florida in the Florida House of Representatives in 1883 and 1885.

He was a presiding elder of the Pensacola Florida District Conference of the African Methodist Episcopal Church (A.M.E.).

He was an incorporator of the Divinity School in Jacksonville, Florida.

His post office was listed at Monticello.

== See also ==
- Reconstruction era
- African American officeholders from the end of the Civil War until before 1900
