= Noadiah Johnson =

American politician

- Born: 1795; Connecticut
- Died: April 4, 1839 (aged 43–44); Albany, New York
- Occupations: Lawyer, newspaperman, politician
- Known for: U.S. Representative from New York
- Relatives: State Senator Stephen C. Johnson (brother)

Noadiah Johnson (1795 Connecticut – April 4, 1839 Albany, New York) was an American lawyer, newspaperman, and politician who served one term as a U.S. representative from New York from 1833 to 1835.

== Life ==
He removed to Delaware County, New York, in 1817. He studied law, was admitted to the bar, and commenced practice in Delhi, New York. He was District Attorney of Delaware County from 1825 to 1833. He was one of the publishers of the Delaware Gazette.

=== Political career ===
Johnson was elected as a Jacksonian to the 23rd United States Congress, holding office from March 4, 1833, to March 3, 1835. He was a member of the New York Senate (3rd D.) from 1837 until his death, sitting in the 60th, 61st and 62nd New York State Legislatures.

=== Death and burial ===
He died on April 4, 1839, and was buried at the Old Delhi Cemetery, Delhi, New York.

== Family ==
State Senator Stephen C. Johnson was his brother.

== Sources ==
- United States Congress. "Noadiah Johnson (id: J000164)". Biographical Directory of the United States Congress.
- The American Biographical Sketch Book by William Hunt (1849; pg. 219)

U.S. House of Representatives
Preceded by Charles Dayan, Daniel Wardwell	Member of the U.S. House of Representatives from New York's 20th congressional district 1833–1835	Succeeded by William Seymour
New York State Senate
Preceded by Peter Gansevoort	New York State Senate; Third District (Class 2); 1837–1839	Succeeded by Mitchell Sanford
