= John W. Brownson (New York politician) =

American politician

John White Brownson (March 12, 1807 – September 5, 1860), was an American politician from New York.

== Life ==
He was born on March 12, 1807, in Sunderland, Bennington County, Vermont, the son of Dr. John White Brownson (1774–1824) and Laura (Chipman) Brownson (1782–1864), daughter of Chief Justice of Vermont Nathaniel Chipman (1752–1843). In 1814, the family removed from Vermont to Gainesville, then in Genesee County, New York, where Dr. Brownson practiced medicine.

On February 27, 1832, John W. Brownson married Frances L. Cole (1813–1901), and they had several children, among them Wisconsin State Representative John W. Brownson (1842–1924).

He was a member of the New York State Assembly in 1840, 1841 (both Genesee Co.), and 1842 (Wyoming Co.). He was Supervisor of the Town of Gainesville in 1844 and 1845.

He was a member of the New York State Senate (30th D.) in 1848 and 1849.

In 1852, he moved to Sharon, Walworth County, Wisconsin, where he died on September 5, 1860. He was buried at the Oakwood Cemetery there.

== Sources ==
- Hough, Franklin B. The New-York Civil List. Albany: Weed, Parsons and Co., 1858, pp. 136, 139, 223f, 227 and 262.
- Short bio from History of Wyoming County by F. W. Beers (1880), transcribed at Gen Forum

New York State Senate
Preceded by new district	New York State Senate; 30th District; 1848–1849	Succeeded by Charles D. Robinson
