= John W. Brownson (Wisconsin politician) =

American politician

John White Brownson III (September 1, 1842 – December 26, 1924) was an American businessman and politician. He was a member of the Wisconsin State Assembly.

== Life ==
He was born on September 1, 1842, in Gainesville, New York, the son of New York State Assemblyman and Senator John W. Brownson (1807–1860) and Frances L. (Cole) Brownson. The family moved to Sharon, Wisconsin in 1852. During the American Civil War, Brownson served in the 13th Wisconsin Volunteer Infantry Regiment. He achieved the rank of sergeant. Brownson was a merchant in Sharon, Wisconsin and served in public office. Brownson served in the Wisconsin State Assembly in 1882.
