= Mark H. Sibley =

American politician

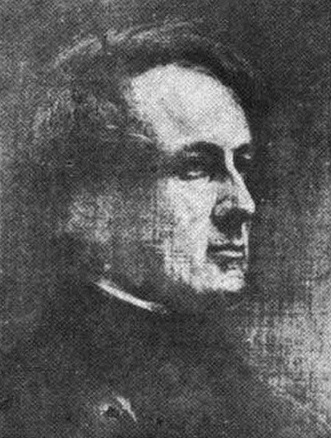
Mark H. Sibley, New York Congressman and Judge.

Mark Hopkins Sibley (1796 – September 8, 1852) was an American politician from New York.

== Life ==
Sibley was born in Great Barrington, Massachusetts in 1796. He studied law, was admitted to the bar, and commenced practice in Canandaigua, New York in 1814.

Sibley served in the New York Militia as judge advocate of the 24th Infantry Brigade, and also served as deputy sheriff of Ontario County.

He was a member of the New York State Assembly (Ontario Co.) in 1835 and 1836. On March 4, 1837, he was elected, as a Whig, to the 25th United States Congress, where he served until March 3, 1839.

Sibley was a member of the New York State Senate (7th D.) in 1840 and 1841. He resigned his seat on May 28, 1841. From 1847 to 1851, he served as the First Judge and Surrogate of Ontario County.

He died in Canandaigua on September 8, 1852, and was buried at the West Avenue Cemetery in Canandaigua.

== Sources ==
- United States Congress. "Mark H. Sibley (id: S000399)". Biographical Directory of the United States Congress.

U.S. House of Representatives
Preceded by Francis Granger	Member of the U.S. House of Representatives from New York's 26th congressional district 1837–1839	Succeeded by Francis Granger
New York State Senate
Preceded by John Beardsley	New York State Senate; Seventh District (Class 1); 1840–1841	Succeeded by Lyman Sherwood
