= Joseph Webb =

British printmaker, painter and teacher

- Born: 1908; Ealing, West London
- Died: 1962 (aged 53–54); London
- Education: Hospitalfield House School of Art
- Known for: etcher and printmaker, painter, illustrator, teacher
- Notable work: Rat Barn, Dream Barn, Chepstow Castle
- Movement: British Etching Revival
- Awards: Royal Society of Painter-Etchers and Engravers

Joseph Webb (1908 – 1962) was a British printmaker, painter and teacher of etching and sculpture.

== Career ==
Born in Ealing, West London, the son of a market gardener, Webb studied painting at Ealing and Chiswick Schools of Art and won a scholarship to the Hospitalfield House School of Art, Arbroath, in 1925.

Webb took up etching in 1927 and his first successful plate was Falls of the Clyde after J. M. W. Turner. He returned to London in 1928 to continue etching under Hubert Schroeder at Chiswick. In 1929, Webb studied with F. L. Griggs in Chipping Campden, Gloucestershire, when the older artist became the principal contemporary influence upon Webb's etched work both technically and in subject matter. Both artists shared a love of ancient buildings set in idealised landscapes, charged with a spiritual and mystical intensity. Following the example of the late Romantic etchings of Samuel Palmer, a group of contemporary British printmakers, including Robin Tanner, Graham Sutherland and Paul Drury, were developing a body of work based on evocative visionary scenes of a lost pre-industrial England.

Webb's most highly acclaimed works following his association with Griggs include 'Rat Barn' and 'Dream Barn', both etched in 1929 when he was just twenty years old, so that in that year he was elected an Associate Member of the Royal Society of Painter-Etchers and Engravers. Webb travelled the British countryside in search of subject matter, visiting Buckinghamshire, Sussex, Kent, Gloucestershire and Wales. He went on to exhibit in art centres in London, Chicago, New York and Paris.

In his paintings and prints, Webb assimilated beliefs founded on his interest in Eastern religions, astrology, mysticism and the occult. Etchers Kenneth Woodbridge and Edgar Holloway recall his interest in Theosophy with its origins in 'Ancient Wisdom' religions. Woodbridge, who knew Webb in the 1930s, described evenings in Webb's studio listening to him talk of 'faraway things, astrology, planetary chains' and‘ancient races of men who lived before the dawn of history, in lost Atlantis'. (Hartley: 6) A close friend and 'soul mate' of the artist, Beryl Gascoigne remembers him talk not of his work but of reincarnation, astrology and eternity. Webb himself never wrote and seldom talked about his motivations; he felt the paintings and prints should speak forthemselves and that the production of art should be triggered by the 'inner self'. (Meyrick: 33)

Webb developed an interest in the writings of William Blake, continuing to make some of his most ambitious prints, expressing his mystical quest in a series of spiritualised landscape subjects. These include his striking series of large-scale etchings: 'The Speaker of Strange Truths', 'Astrologer Instructing his Pupils', 'A Mystery Temple' and 'The Doors of the Heart'. He also produced highly-wrought etchings on an intimate scale, plates such as 'Shepherd's Haven (1929) and 'A Buckinghamshire Lane' (1931). As the market for etchings all but dried up following the Wall Street crash in October 1929, he supplemented his income by teaching etching at the Chiswick School of Art and undertaking varied commercial work, such as society portraits and posters for Shell-Mex.

By the 1950s he abandoned printmaking and painted in an increasingly private and eccentric manner, altogether ceasing to exhibit his work. Suffering from mental illness, he helped run a café with his common-law wife, an art teacher Ella Hemans (d.1956), occasionally drawing cartoons and caricatures on menu cards. He died in London in 1962.

== Legacy ==
In spite of the decline in his reputation during his later years, today his etchings are among the most sought-after of his generation. They are found in major museum collections worldwide, including in Britain the British Museum and the Victoria and Albert Museum in London, the Fitzwilliam Museum, Cambridge, and Aberystwyth School of Art Gallery and Museum, and in the United States in Boston, San Francisco and Los Angeles.

"La Revue Moderne" wrote of Joseph Webb's work: "A curious dualism in this artist shows first the poet, sensitive to scenes of nature, of romantic landscapes, then the seeker in the mystic, in love with everything relating to the intercourse of being with the unknown forces of the world."

== Sources and bibliography ==
- Guichard, Kenneth M., British Etchers 1850-1940 (London: Robin Garton, 1977)
- Hammersley, Kate, In the Master’s House: Religion and the Intaglio Prints of Joseph Webb 1908-1962 (Aberystwyth University: unpublished MA dissertation, 1995)
- Hartley, Craig, Joseph Webb: Prints and Working Drawings (catalogue) (Cambridge: Fitzwilliam Museum, 1989)
- Loffman, Jen On Resistance and Reconciliation: The Paintings of Joseph Webb 1908-1962 (Aberystwyth University: unpublished BA dissertation, 2012)
- Meyrick, Robert, Joseph Webb: the lights that flit across my brain (Aberystwyth University: School of Art Museum and Gallery, 2007), PDF
- Webb, Joseph, Exhibition of the Engraved Work of Joseph Webb ARE, list of works exhibited at Bent Tree Studio, Harrow-on-the-Hill,1932
- Harold Wright's papers at the University of Glasgow Library
