= Leonard Gibbs (assemblyman) =

New York politician

Leonard Gibbs (April 21, 1800 – September 12, 1863) was an American lawyer and politician from New York.

== Life ==
He was born on April 21, 1800, in Fort Ann, Washington County, New York, the son of Dr. Leonard Gibbs and Betsey (Robards) Gibbs.

He was District Attorney of Washington County from 1828 to 1836. On April 15, 1834, he married Mary Ann Beckwith (born 1813), and they had four children.

Gibbs was a Whig member of the New York State Assembly (Washington Co.) in 1838.

In 1839, he removed to New York City, and practiced law there until 1845. Afterwards he returned to Washington County, and lived in Greenwich.

He died on September 12, 1863, in Greenwich, New York.
