= Henry W. Strong =

American politician

Henry Wright Strong

Member of the New York Senate from the 3rd district
- In office 1841–1844
- Preceded by: Mitchell Sanford
- Succeeded by: John P. Beekman

Recorder of Troy, New York
- In office 1838–1844

Personal details
- Born: December 11, 1810 Amherst, Massachusetts
- Died: February 28, 1848 (aged 37) Troy, New York
- Party: Democratic
- Education: Amherst College

Henry Wright Strong (December 11, 1810 in Amherst, Hampshire County, Massachusetts – February 28, 1848 in Troy, Rensselaer County, New York) was an American lawyer and politician from New York.

== Life ==
He was the son of Hezekiah W. Strong (1768–1848) and Martha (Dwight) Strong (1783–1844). He graduated from Amherst College in 1825. Then he studied law with his brother-in-law, Judge Isaac McConihe, at Troy, was admitted to the bar in 1829, and practiced in Troy.

He was Recorder of Troy from 1838 to 1844. He married Sarah Elizabeth Cornell (b. 1823), and they had two sons: Latham Cornell Strong (1845–1879), a poet who published four volumes of verse; and posthumous Henry Wright Strong (1848–1851).

He was a member of the New York State Senate (3rd D.) from 1841 to 1844, sitting in the 64th, 65th, 66th and 67th New York State Legislatures. He resigned his seat on December 3, 1844.

He was one of three secretaries (with James F. Starbuck and Francis Seger) of the New York State Constitutional Convention of 1846.

Justice Simeon Strong (1736–1805) was his grandfather; President of the Wisconsin Territorial Council Marshall Strong (1813–1864) was his brother.

== Sources ==
- The New York Civil List compiled by Franklin Benjamin Hough (pages 58, 133f and 147; Weed, Parsons and Co., 1858)
- The History of the Descendants of Elder John Strong, of Nirthampton, Mass. by Benjamin Woodbridge Dwight (Albany, 1871; Vol. II, pg. 1338–1343)

New York State Senate
Preceded by Mitchell Sanford	New York State Senate; Third District (Class 2); 1841–1844	Succeeded by John P. Beekman
