= Thomas Farrington (American politician) =

American politician (1799–1872)

Thomas Farrington (February 12, 1799 – December 2, 1872) was an American lawyer and politician.

== Life ==
He was born on February 12, 1799, in Delhi, New York. Farrington lived at Owego.

He was a Democratic member from Tioga County of the New York State Assembly in 1833 and 1840, Surrogate of Tioga County from 1835 to 1840, New York State Treasurer from 1842 to 1845 and from 1846 to 1847. From 1845 to 1846, he was Adjutant General of New York; he succeeded Archibald C. Niven and was succeeded by Robert E. Temple.

He was also a delegate to the 1856 Republican National Convention.

His daughter Mary married New York Supreme Court justice Charles E. Parker.

== Sources ==
- Political Graveyard
- The New York Civil List compiled by Franklin Benjamin Hough (pages 35, 273 and 418; Weed, Parsons and Co., 1858)

Political offices
Preceded by Jacob Haight	New York State Treasurer; 1842–1845	Succeeded by Benjamin Enos
Preceded by Benjamin Enos	New York State Treasurer; 1846–1847	Succeeded by Alvah Hunt
