= Wayland Hoyt =

American Baptist minister and author

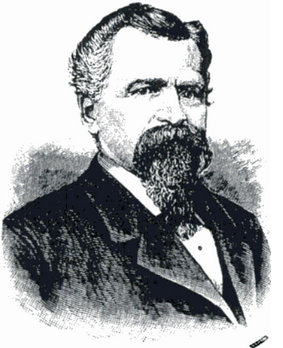
Wayland Hoyt, American Baptist Church minister and author

Wayland Hoyt (February 18, 1838 – September 27, 1910) was an American Baptist minister and author.

== Early life and education ==
Born on February 18, 1838, in Cleveland, Ohio. He was born the oldest son of Mary Ella Beebee Hoyt and Dr. James Hoyt, a Baptist minister, lawyer, businessman and author. Wayland was one of six children. One of his brothers, Colgate, was in business with his father and another, Elton, practiced law.

Hoyt graduated from Brown University in 1860 and from Rochester Theological Seminary in 1863.

== Ministry ==
He was ordained in Pittsfield, Massachusetts, at a Baptist church. The following year he became pastor of the Ninth Street Baptist Church in Cincinnati, Ohio.

In 1867 he moved to Brooklyn where he became minister of the Strong Place Baptist Church. The church, described as a "large and influential church", was where Hoyt "began the development of his powers as a profound thinker, a scholarly writer, and an able preacher." Hoyt left the Strong Place church and was briefly the minister at the Tabernacle Baptist Church in New York and then the Shawmut Baptist Church in Boston. He then returned to Strong Place in Brooklyn.

In July, 1882, he succeeded Dr. Henson at Memorial, Philadelphia. Seven years later, in December, 1889, he moved to Minneapolis.

He thereafter returned to Philadelphia to accept a call to Epiphany. At the Memorial Church in eight years he baptized 319 converts, the chapel was remodeled at a cost of $8,966. Hoyt developed a widespread reputation as a preacher.

== American Baptist Church ==
Hoyt was one of the managers of the American Baptist Publication Society and served on the Missionary, Publication and Bible Committees. He was a manager on the American Baptist Missionary Union in 1899.

Hoyt delivered addresses to young ministers and the Ministers' Union of the American Baptist Church.

== Causes ==
Among the causes to which he dedicated himself were the education of freed slaves and their descendants, following the Civil War; the expanding of missions to Native Americans and to Mexico, and the prohibition of liquor.

== Publications ==
=== Sermons and articles ===
Many of Hoyts sermons and articles were published in newspapers, such as the New York Times, or in books or journals.

=== Books ===
The following is a partial list of Hoyt's publications:

- For Shine and Shade: Short Essays in Practical Religion. Amer. Baptist Pub. Society. 1899.
- Gleams from Paul's Prison, Or, Studies for the Daily Life in the Epistle to the Philippians. Griffith and Rowland. 1903.
- Lay Preaching: Sermon by Rev. Wayland Hoyt, Pastor of the Strong Place Baptist Church, Brooklyn, at the First Anniversary of the New York Baptist Lay Preaching Association, Held in the Madison Avenue Baptist Church, New York City, Sunday Evening, November 14th, 1869, with an Abstract of the Proceedings of Said Anniversary. American Baptist Publication Society. 1869.
- Light on Life's Highway: For the Despondent and the Cheerful, the Tried and the Toiling, the Doubting and the Believing--for Those Under Bright Skies Or Gray. P.W. Garfield. 1891.
- Saturday Afternoon: Or, Conversations for the Culture of the Christian Life. American Baptist publication society. 1889.
- Some Reasons Versus Destructive Criticism. American Baptist Publ. 1908.
- The Brook in the Way (reprint). BiblioBazaar. October 2009. ISBN 978-1-115-67130-9.
- The Teaching of Jesus Concerning His Own Person (reprint). HardPress. January 2012. ISBN 978-1-4077-0026-7.
- Walks and Talks with Charles H. Spurgeon. American Baptist Pub. Society. 1892.
- Young Men of the City; Their Dangers and Needs. The Association. 1866.

== Death ==
He died at Salem, Massachusetts.
