= Horace Hunt =

Australian cricketer

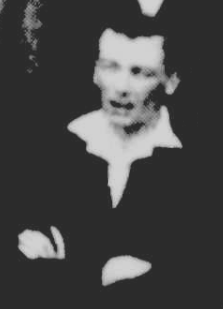

Personal information
- Born: 15 July 1907; Stawell, Victoria, Australia
- Died: 15 October 1984 (aged 77); Melbourne, Australia

Domestic team information
- Years: Team
- 1928-1930: Victoria
- Source: Cricinfo, 21 November 2015

Horace Hunt (15 July 1907 – 15 October 1984) was an Australian cricketer. He played two first-class cricket matches for Victoria between 1928 and 1930.

== See also ==
- List of Victoria first-class cricketers
