= David Hudson (New York politician) =

American politician (1782–1860)

David Hudson (August 23, 1782 Dutchess County, New York - January 12, 1860 Geneva, Ontario County, New York) was an American lawyer, writer and politician from New York.

== Life ==
He was the son of Asa Hudson (b. 1749) and Mary (Scott) Hudson (1752–1825). On January 16, 1816, he married Hester (Hetty) Schuyler Dey (1792–1863).

In 1821, he published a History of Jemima Wilkinson (on-line version), a biography of the Public Universal Friend, described by historians as "hostile and inaccurate", and accused of having been written to influence a then-ongoing court case over land owned by the Society of Universal Friends.

He was a Whig member from Ontario County of the New York State Assembly in 1838. In 1840, he was elected a canal commissioner, and remained in office until 1842.

He, his wife, and three of their children who died in infancy were buried at Pulteney Street Cemetery in Geneva, NY.

== Sources ==
- Death notice in Ontario Messenger on January 25, 1860 (gives January 13 as death date)
- Burial record (gives January 12 as death date)
- Family tree (gives January 13 as death date)
- The History of the Treman, Tremaine, Truman Family in America: With the Related Families of Mack, Dey, Board and Ayers by Ebenezer Mack Treman & Murray Edward Poole (Press of the Ithaca Democrat, 1901) [gives January 12 as death date]
- The New York Civil List compiled by Franklin Benjamin Hough (pages 42, 222 and 282; Weed, Parsons and Co., 1858)
