= Benjamin Enos =

American politician (1788–1868)

Benjamin Enos (February 13, 1788 in Richmond, Washington County, Rhode Island – February 4, 1868 in DeRuyter, Madison County, New York) was an American politician.

== Life ==
He was the son of Joseph Enos and Thankful Enos. On April 5, 1810, he married Sarah Doty (1788–1884) at Canaan, New York. In 1814, they settled in DeRuyter, NY.

He was a member from Madison County of the New York State Assembly in 1834, 1839 and 1840. He was Supervisor of the Town of DeRuyter in 1837. In 1842, he was elected by the New York State Legislature a canal commissioner. As a member of the Hunker faction of the Democratic Party, he was New York State Treasurer from 1845 to 1846.

== Sources ==
- Political Graveyard
- Description of DeRuyter by Rev. L. R. Swinney, at USGenNet
- The New York Civil List compiled by Franklin Benjamin Hough (pages 35, 42 and 272; Weed, Parsons and Co., 1858)
- History of De Ruyter, NY - from Our County and Its People, a Descriptive and Biographical Record of Madison County, NY ed. by John E. Smith (The Boston History Company, 1899)
- Political History of the State of New York from January 1, 1841, to January 1, 1847, Vol III, including the Life of Silas Wright by Jabez Delano Hammond (Hall & Dickson, Syracuse NY, 1848) Google Books, page 525
- The Doty-Doten Family in America: Descendants of Edward Doty, an Emigrant by the Mayflower, 1620 by E. A. Doty (Higginson Genealogical Books, 1988)

Political offices
Preceded by Thomas Farrington	New York State Treasurer; 1845–1846	Succeeded by Thomas Farrington
