= 75th New York State Legislature =

New York state legislative session

←	74th	76th	→
- The Old State Capitol (1879)

Overview
- Legislative body: New York State Legislature
- Jurisdiction: New York, United States
- Term: January 1 – December 31, 1852

Senate
- Members: 32
- President: Lt. Gov. Sanford E. Church (D)
- Temporary President: Edwin D. Morgan (W), from January 26; William McMurray (D), from March 24
- Party control: split (16-16)

Assembly
- Members: 128
- Speaker: Jonas C. Heartt (W)
- Party control: Whig (65-63)

Sessions
- 1st: January 6 – April 16, 1852

The 75th New York State Legislature, consisting of the New York State Senate and the New York State Assembly, met from January 6 to April 16, 1852, during the second year of Washington Hunt's governorship, in Albany.

== Background ==
Under the provisions of the New York Constitution of 1846, 32 Senators were elected in single-seat senatorial districts for a two-year term, the whole Senate being renewed biennially. The senatorial districts (except those in New York City) were made up of entire counties. 128 Assemblymen were elected in single-seat districts to a one-year term, the whole Assembly being renewed annually. The Assembly districts were made up of entire towns, or city wards, forming a contiguous area, all in the same county. The City and County of New York was divided into four senatorial districts, and 16 Assembly districts.

At this time there were two major political parties: the Democratic Party and the Whig Party.

== Elections ==
The 1851 New York state election was held on November 4.

Of the eight statewide elective offices up for election, six were carried by the Democrats, and two by the Whigs.

16 Democrats and 16 Whigs were elected for a two-year term to the State Senate.

65 Whigs and 63 Democrats were elected to the State Assembly.

== Sessions ==
The Legislature met for the regular session at the Old State Capitol in Albany on January 6, 1852; and adjourned on April 16.

Jonas C. Heartt (Whig) was elected Speaker with 63 votes against 59 for Israel T. Hatch (Dem.).

Ira P. Barnes was elected Clerk of the Senate by resolution, with a vote of 16 to 15; Senator Dan S. Wright (W) did not vote. The same vote was given for Charles Lee as Sergeant-at-Arms of the Senate. Doorkeeper of the Senate A. N. Beardsley was elected with the casting vote of Lt. Gov. Sanford E. Church.

On January 26, Edwin D. Morgan (W) was elected president pro tempore of the Senate.

On March 24, William McMurray (D) was elected president pro tempore of the Senate.

== State Senate ==
=== Districts ===
- 1st District: Queens, Richmond and Suffolk counties
- 2nd District: Kings County
- 3rd District: 1st, 2nd, 3rd, 4th, 5th and 6th wards of New York City
- 4th District: 7th, 10th, 13th and 17th wards of New York City
- 5th District: 8th, 9th and 14th wards of New York City
- 6th District: 11th, 12th, 15th, 16th, 18th, 19th, 20th, 21st and 22nd wards of New York City
- 7th District: Putnam, Rockland and Westchester counties
- 8th District: Columbia and Dutchess counties
- 9th District: Orange and Sullivan counties
- 10th District: Greene and Ulster counties
- 11th District: Albany and Schenectady counties
- 12th District: Rensselaer County
- 13th District: Saratoga and Washington counties
- 14th District: Clinton, Essex and Warren counties
- 15th District: Franklin and St. Lawrence counties
- 16th District: Fulton, Hamilton, Herkimer and Montgomery counties
- 17th District: Delaware and Schoharie counties
- 18th District: Chenango and Otsego counties
- 19th District: Oneida County
- 20th District: Madison and Oswego counties
- 21st District: Jefferson and Lewis counties
- 22nd District: Onondaga County
- 23rd District: Broome, Cortland and Tioga counties
- 24th District: Cayuga and Wayne counties
- 25th District: Seneca, Tompkins and Yates counties
- 26th District: Chemung and Steuben counties
- 27th District: Monroe County
- 28th District: Genesee, Niagara and Orleans counties
- 29th District: Livingston and Ontario counties
- 30th District: Allegany and Wyoming counties
- 31st District: Erie County
- 32nd District: Cattaraugus and Chautauqua counties
Note: There are now 62 counties in the State of New York. The counties which are not mentioned in this list had not yet been established, or sufficiently organized, the area being included in one or more of the abovementioned counties.

=== Members ===
The asterisk (*) denotes members of the previous Legislature who continued in office as members of this Legislature.

District	Senator	Party	Notes
1st	James E. Cooley	Democrat	
2nd	John Vanderbilt	Democrat	
3rd	William McMurray	Democrat	on March 24, elected president pro tempore
4th	Obadiah Newcomb	Whig	
5th	James W. Beekman*	Whig	
6th	Edwin D. Morgan*	Whig	on January 26, elected president pro tempore
7th	Abraham B. Conger	Democrat	
8th	John H. Otis	Democrat	
9th	Nathaniel Jones	Democrat	
10th	George T. Pierce	Democrat	
11th	Azor Taber	Whig	
12th	William H. Van Schoonhoven	Whig	
13th	Dan S. Wright	Whig	
14th	Eli W. Rogers	Democrat	
15th	Henry B. Smith	Democrat	
16th	Simeon Snow	Democrat	
17th	Henry E. Bartlett	Democrat	
18th	Harmon Bennett	Democrat	
19th	Benjamin N. Huntington*	Whig	
20th	James Platt	Whig	
21st	Ashley Davenport	Democrat	
22nd	James Munroe	Whig	
23rd	Nathan Bristol	Democrat	
24th	William Beach*	Whig	
25th	Josiah B. Williams	Whig	
26th	Francis R. E. Cornell	Democrat	
27th	Micajah W. Kirby	Democrat	
28th	Alonzo S. Upham*	Whig	
29th	Myron H. Clark	Whig	
30th	John A. McElwain	Whig	also Treasurer of Wyoming Co.
31st	George R. Babcock*	Whig	
32nd	Elisha Ward	Whig	

=== Employees ===
- Clerk: Ira P. Barnes
- Sergeant-at-Arms: Charles Lee
- Doorkeeper: A. N. Beardsley
- Assistant Doorkeeper: George Read

== State Assembly ==
=== Assemblymen ===
The asterisk (*) denotes members of the previous Legislature who continued as members of this Legislature.

Party affiliations follow the vote on Speaker.

District		Assemblymen	Party	Notes
Albany	1st	Hugh Swift	Democrat	
Albany	2nd	George M. Sayles	Whig	
Albany	3rd	Teunis Van Vechten Jr.	Whig	
Albany	4th	Robert Harper	Democrat	
Allegany	1st	John Wheeler	Whig	
Allegany	2nd	John R. Hartshorn	Democrat	
Broome		William L. Ford	Whig	
Cattaraugus	1st	Stephen S. Cole	Whig	
Cattaraugus	2nd	Alexander Sheldon	Whig	
Cayuga	1st	William Hayden	Whig	
Cayuga	2nd	George Underwood*	Whig	
Cayuga	3rd	Delos Bradley*	Whig	
Chautauqua	1st	Austin Smith*	Whig	
Chautauqua	2nd	Jeremiah Ellsworth	Whig	
Chemung		James B. Van Etten	Whig	
Chenango	1st	Thompson White	Democrat	
Chenango	2nd	Joseph P. Chamberlin	Democrat	
Clinton		Jacob H. Holt	Democrat	
Columbia	1st	Wesley R. Gallup	Democrat	
Columbia	2nd	George Van Santvoord	Democrat	
Cortland		George W. Bradford	Whig	
Delaware	1st	Hezekiah Elwood	Democrat	
Delaware	2nd	Lewis Mills	Democrat	
Dutchess	1st	John S. Emans	Democrat	
Dutchess	2nd	John M. Keese	Whig	
Dutchess	3rd	Augustus Martin	Democrat	
Erie	1st	Israel T. Hatch	Democrat	
Erie	2nd	Jasper B. Young	Whig	
Erie	3rd	Aaron Riley	Whig	
Erie	4th	Joseph Bennett	Whig	
Essex		Abraham Welden*	Whig	
Franklin		Darius W. Lawrence	Democrat	
Fulton and Hamilton		Alfred N. Haner	Whig	
Genesee	1st	Albert Rowe*	Whig	
Genesee	2nd	Levi Fisk*	Whig	
Greene	1st	Norman H. Gray	Democrat	
Greene	2nd	Thomas Bedell Jr.	Democrat	
Herkimer	1st	John Hoover	Democrat	
Herkimer	2nd	Charles Delong	Democrat	
Jefferson	1st	William A. Gilbert*	Whig	
Jefferson	2nd	Merrill Coburn	Democrat	
Jefferson	3rd	William Rouse	Whig	
Kings	1st	John Berry	Democrat	
Kings	2nd	Waldo Hutchins	Whig	
Kings	3rd	Samuel E. Johnson	Democrat	
Lewis		John Benedict	Democrat	
Livingston	1st	Alvin Chamberlin*	Whig	
Livingston	2nd	Orrin D. Lake*	Whig	
Madison	1st	George B. Rowe	Whig	
Madison	2nd	Henry L. Webb	Whig	
Monroe	1st	John Shoecraft	Whig	
Monroe	2nd	Joel P. Milliner	Whig	
Monroe	3rd	Caleb B. Corser*	Whig	
Montgomery	1st	John I. Davis	Whig	
Montgomery	2nd	William Clark	Whig	
New York	1st	William Miner	Democrat	took his seat on February 25
New York	2nd	Patrick G. Maloney	Democrat	
New York	3rd	Joseph Rose Jr.	Democrat	
New York	4th	Theodore A. Ward	Whig	
New York	5th	John Brown	Democrat	
New York	6th	Wyllis Blackstone*	Whig	
New York	7th	Freeborn G. Luckey	Whig	
New York	8th	Moses D. Gale	Democrat	
New York	9th	Aaron B. Rollins	Democrat	
New York	10th	James Monroe	Whig	
New York	11th	David O'Keefe Jr.	Democrat	
New York	12th	Michael Walsh	Democrat	on November 2, 1852, elected to the U.S. Congress
New York	13th	William Taylor	Whig	
New York	14th	Andrew Leary	Democrat	
New York	15th	Thomas P. St. John	Democrat	
New York	16th	Ephraim L. Snow	Whig	contested by Russell Smith (D); the seat was declared vacant on February 28, 1852
Niagara	1st	Abijah H. Moss*	Whig	
Niagara	2nd	Jeptha W. Babcock*	Whig	
Oneida	1st	George D. Williams	Whig	
Oneida	2nd	Chauncey S. Butler	Whig	
Oneida	3rd	Henry Sandford	Democrat	
Oneida	4th	John J. Castle	Democrat	
Onondaga	1st	Lyman Norton	Democrat	
Onondaga	2nd	William E. Tallman	Whig	
Onondaga	3rd	George Stevens*	Whig	
Onondaga	4th	John Merritt	Democrat	
Ontario	1st	William R. Pettit	Whig	
Ontario	2nd	Elnathan U. Simmons	Democrat	
Orange	1st	Hugh B. Bull	Whig	
Orange	2nd	James B. Stevens	Democrat	
Orange	3rd	Abraham J. Cuddeback	Democrat	
Orleans		George M. Copeland	Whig	
Oswego	1st	Edwin C. Hart	Democrat	
Oswego	2nd	James T. Gibson	Democrat	
Otsego	1st	Hanson Wright	Democrat	
Otsego	2nd	Erastus King	Democrat	
Otsego	3rd	Harvey Keyes	Democrat	
Putnam		Nathan A. Howes	Democrat	
Queens		Sylvanus S. Smith	Democrat	
Rensselaer	1st	Jonas C. Heartt	Whig	elected Speaker
Rensselaer	2nd	Albert E. Richmond	Whig	
Rensselaer	3rd	William H. Herrick	Whig	
Richmond		Lawrence H. Cortelyou	Whig	
Rockland		John Demarest	Democrat	
St. Lawrence	1st	Smith Stilwell*	Democrat	
St. Lawrence	2nd	Benjamin Smith	Democrat	
St. Lawrence	3rd	Parker W. Rose	Democrat	
Saratoga	1st	Isaiah Blood	Democrat	
Saratoga	2nd	Alexander H. Palmer	Whig	
Schenectady		James Donnan	Whig	
Schoharie	1st	Seymour Sornberger	Democrat	
Schoharie	2nd	James Osterhout	Democrat	
Seneca		Robert R. Steele	Democrat	
Steuben	1st	Robert B. Van Valkenburgh	Whig	
Steuben	2nd	Benajah P. Bailey	Whig	
Steuben	3rd	Nathaniel M. Perry	Democrat	
Suffolk	1st	Henry P. Hedges	Whig	
Suffolk	2nd	Zopher B. Oakley	Whig	
Sullivan		Elisha P. Strong	Democrat	
Tioga		William Pierson	Democrat	
Tompkins	1st	Alvah Hurlbut	Whig	
Tompkins	2nd	Stephen B. Cushing	Democrat	
Ulster	1st	Jacob S. Freer	Democrat	
Ulster	2nd	Jacob Westbrook Jr.	Democrat	unsuccessfully contested by Job G. Elmore (W)
Warren		George Richards	Whig	
Washington	1st	Elisha Billings	Whig	
Washington	2nd	David Wilson	Whig	
Wayne	1st	William Dutton	Whig	
Wayne	2nd	Theron G. Yeomans*	Whig	
Westchester	1st	George W. Lyon	Democrat	
Westchester	2nd	Abraham Hatfield	Democrat	
Wyoming		Wolcott J. Humphrey*	Whig	
Yates		Charles S. Hoyt	Democrat	

=== Employees ===
- Clerk: Richard U. Sherman
- Sergeant-at-Arms: Joseph W. Caldwell
- Doorkeeper: Nathan Chamberlin
- First Assistant Doorkeeper: Archibald Smith
- Second Assistant Doorkeeper: Asa Baldwin

== Sources ==
- The New York Civil List compiled by Franklin Benjamin Hough (Weed, Parsons and Co., 1858) [pg. 109 for Senate districts; pg. 137 for senators; pg. 148–157 for Assembly districts; pg. 242ff for assemblymen]
- Journal of the Senate (75th Session) (1852)
- Journal of the Assembly (75th Session) (1852)
