= 76th New York State Legislature =

New York state legislative session

←	75th	77th	→
- The Old State Capitol (1879)

Overview
- Legislative body: New York State Legislature
- Jurisdiction: New York, United States
- Term: January 1 – December 31, 1853

Senate
- Members: 32
- President: Lt. Gov. Sanford E. Church (D)
- Temporary President: William McMurray (D), from January 19; Edwin D. Morgan (W), from July 21
- Party control: split (16-16)

Assembly
- Members: 128
- Speaker: William H. Ludlow (D)
- Party control: Democratic (87-41)

Sessions
- 1st: January 4 – April 13, 1853
- 2nd: April 14 – 15, 1853
- 3rd: May 24 – July 21, 1853

The 76th New York State Legislature, consisting of the New York State Senate and the New York State Assembly, met in Albany from January 4 to July 21, 1853, during the first year of Horatio Seymour's governorship.

== Background ==
Under the provisions of the New York Constitution of 1846, 32 Senators were elected in single-seat senatorial districts for a two-year term, with the whole Senate being renewed biennially. The senatorial districts (except those in New York City) were made up of entire counties. One hundred and twenty-eight Assemblymen were elected in single-seat districts to a one-year term, with the whole Assembly being renewed annually. The Assembly districts were made up of entire towns, or city wards, forming a contiguous area, all in the same county. The City and County of New York was divided into four senatorial districts, and 16 Assembly districts.

At this time there were two major political parties: the Democratic Party and the Whig Party.

== Elections ==
The 1852 New York state election was held on November 2. Horatio Seymour (D) was elected governor, defeating the incumbent Washington Hunt (W). Lt. Gov. Sanford E. Church (D) was re-elected. The other two statewide elective offices up for election were also carried by the Democrats.

== Sessions ==
The Legislature met for the regular session at the Old State Capitol in Albany on January 4, 1853, and adjourned on April 13.

William H. Ludlow (D) was elected Speaker with 85 votes against 39 for Jeremiah Ellsworth (W). John S. Nafew (D) was elected Clerk of the Assembly with 86 votes against 40 for the incumbent Richard U. Sherman (W).

On January 19, William McMurray (D) was elected President pro tempore of the Senate.

On April 13, Governor Horatio Seymour called a special session of the Legislature, to conclude the unfinished business of the regular session.

On April 14, the Legislature met for a special session; and adjourned on April 15.

On May 24, the Legislature met for another special session; and adjourned on July 21.

On July 1, Russell Smith (D) was elected Speaker pro tempore, to preside over the Assembly during the absence of Speaker Ludlow.

On July 8, the Assembly impeached Canal Commissioner John C. Mather.

On July 21, near the end of the session, Edwin D. Morgan (W) was elected president pro tempore of the Senate.

On July 27, the New York Court for the Trial of Impeachments (consisting of the State Senate and the New York Court of Appeals), met at Albany, for the first time in State history. Assemblymen Marshall B. Champlain, Arphaxed Loomis, John McBurney, Solomon B. Noble (all four Democrats), Orlando Hastings, Walter L. Sessions and Daniel P. Wood (all three Whigs) appeared as the Managers to prosecute the impeachment. Congressman Rufus W. Peckham (D) appeared for the Defense. After organizing, the Court adjourned.

On August 16, the Impeachment Court met for the trial, which lasted until Mather was acquitted on September 16.

== State Senate ==
=== Districts ===
- 1st District: Queens, Richmond and Suffolk counties
- 2nd District: Kings County
- 3rd District: 1st, 2nd, 3rd, 4th, 5th and 6th wards of New York City
- 4th District: 7th, 10th, 13th and 17th wards of New York City
- 5th District: 8th, 9th and 14th wards of New York City
- 6th District: 11th, 12th, 15th, 16th, 18th, 19th, 20th, 21st and 22nd wards of New York City
- 7th District: Putnam, Rockland and Westchester counties
- 8th District: Columbia and Dutchess counties
- 9th District: Orange and Sullivan counties
- 10th District: Greene and Ulster counties
- 11th District: Albany and Schenectady counties
- 12th District: Rensselaer County
- 13th District: Saratoga and Washington counties
- 14th District: Clinton, Essex and Warren counties
- 15th District: Franklin and St. Lawrence counties
- 16th District: Fulton, Hamilton, Herkimer and Montgomery counties
- 17th District: Delaware and Schoharie counties
- 18th District: Chenango and Otsego counties
- 19th District: Oneida County
- 20th District: Madison and Oswego counties
- 21st District: Jefferson and Lewis counties
- 22nd District: Onondaga County
- 23rd District: Broome, Cortland and Tioga counties
- 24th District: Cayuga and Wayne counties
- 25th District: Seneca, Tompkins and Yates counties
- 26th District: Chemung and Steuben counties
- 27th District: Monroe County
- 28th District: Genesee, Niagara and Orleans counties
- 29th District: Livingston and Ontario counties
- 30th District: Allegany and Wyoming counties
- 31st District: Erie County
- 32nd District: Cattaraugus and Chautauqua counties
Note: There are now 62 counties in the State of New York. The counties which are not mentioned in this list had not yet been established, or sufficiently organized, the area being included in one or more of the abovementioned counties.

=== Members ===
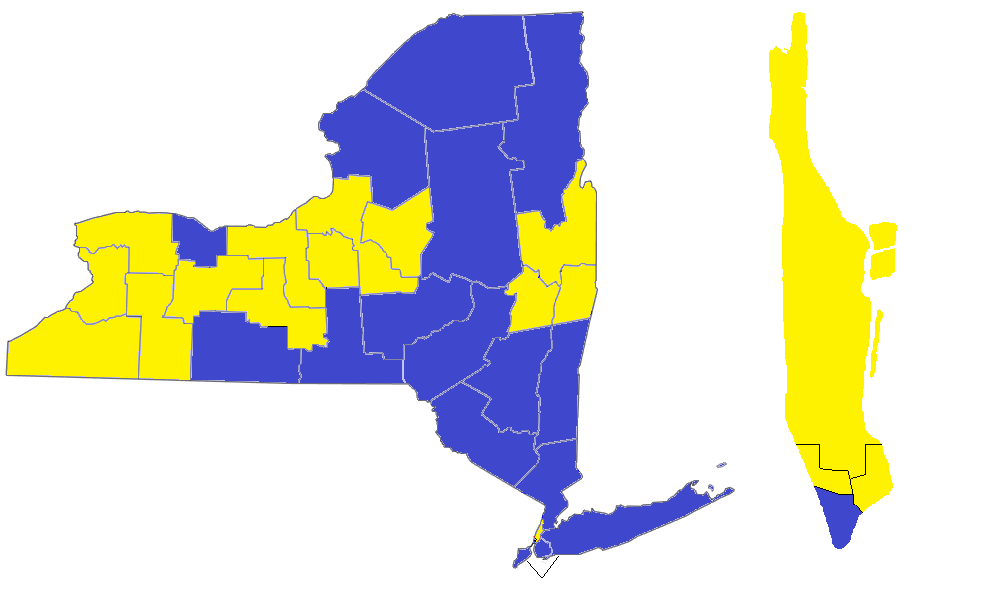
Parties by district.

The asterisk (*) denotes members of the previous Legislature who continued in office as members of this Legislature.

District	Senator	Party	Notes
1st	James E. Cooley*	Democrat	
2nd	John Vanderbilt*	Democrat	
3rd	William McMurray*	Democrat	on January 19, elected president pro tempore
4th	Obadiah Newcomb*	Whig	
5th	James W. Beekman*	Whig	
6th	Edwin D. Morgan*	Whig	on July 21, elected president pro tempore
7th	Abraham B. Conger*	Democrat	
8th	John H. Otis*	Democrat	
9th	Nathaniel Jones*	Democrat	
10th	George T. Pierce*	Democrat	
11th	Azor Taber*	Whig	
12th	William H. Van Schoonhoven*	Whig	
13th	Dan S. Wright*	Whig	
14th	Eli W. Rogers*	Democrat	
15th	Henry B. Smith*	Democrat	
16th	Simeon Snow*	Democrat	
17th	Henry E. Bartlett*	Democrat	
18th	Harmon Bennett*	Democrat	
19th	Benjamin N. Huntington*	Whig	
20th	James Platt*	Whig	
21st	Ashley Davenport*	Democrat	
22nd	James Munroe*	Whig	
23rd	Nathan Bristol*	Democrat	
24th	William Beach*	Whig	
25th	Josiah B. Williams*	Whig	
26th	Francis R. E. Cornell*	Democrat	
27th	Micajah W. Kirby*	Democrat	
28th	Alonzo S. Upham*	Whig	
29th	Myron H. Clark*	Whig	
30th	John A. McElwain*	Whig	also Treasurer of Wyoming Co.
31st	George R. Babcock*	Whig	
32nd	Elisha Ward*	Whig	

=== Employees ===
- Clerk: Ira P. Barnes
- Sergeant-at-Arms: Charles Lee
- Doorkeeper: A. N. Beardsley
- Assistant Doorkeeper: George Read

== State Assembly ==
=== Assemblymen ===
The asterisk (*) denotes members of the previous Legislature who continued as members of this Legislature.

Party affiliations follow the vote on Speaker.

District		Assemblymen	Party	Notes
Albany	1st	William P. Malburn	Democrat	
Albany	2nd	John Reid	Whig	
Albany	3rd	William W. Forsyth	Democrat	
Albany	4th	Thomas Kearney	Democrat	
Allegany	1st	Emulous Townsend	Whig	
Allegany	2nd	Marshall B. Champlain	Democrat	also a Manager at the impeachment trial
Broome		Joseph E. Ely	Democrat	
Cattaraugus	1st	Daniel Hickox	Democrat	
Cattaraugus	2nd	Michael H. Barker	Democrat	
Cayuga	1st	William Hayden*	Whig	
Cayuga	2nd	Terance J. Kennedy	Whig	
Cayuga	3rd	Mathias Hutchinson	Whig	
Chautauqua	1st	Walter L. Sessions	Whig	also a Manager at the impeachment trial
Chautauqua	2nd	Jeremiah Ellsworth*	Whig	
Chemung		Hiram W. Jackson	Democrat	
Chenango	1st	William H. Amsbry	Democrat	
Chenango	2nd	Luther Osgood Jr.	Democrat	
Clinton		George V. Hoyle	Whig	
Columbia	1st	Henry A. Dubois	Whig	
Columbia	2nd	Alonzo Chamberlain	Democrat	
Cortland		Ashbel Patterson	Democrat	
Delaware	1st	Charles S. Rogers	Democrat	
Delaware	2nd	Daniel Stewart	Whig	
Dutchess	1st	John S. Emans*	Democrat	
Dutchess	2nd	James H. Weeks	Democrat	
Dutchess	3rd	Augustus Martin*	Democrat	
Erie	1st	Almon M. Clapp	Whig	
Erie	2nd	William T. Bush	Whig	
Erie	3rd	Israel N. Ely	Whig	
Erie	4th	Nelson Welch	Whig	
Essex		Jonathan Burnet	Whig	
Franklin		Darius W. Lawrence*	Democrat	
Fulton and Hamilton		William A. Smith	Democrat	
Genesee	1st	Theodore C. Peters	Whig	
Genesee	2nd	Joseph Cook	Whig	
Greene	1st	Darius Winans	Democrat	
Greene	2nd	Elijah P. Bushnell	Democrat	
Herkimer	1st	Arphaxed Loomis	Democrat	also a Manager at the impeachment trial
Herkimer	2nd	John W. Beckwith	Democrat	
Jefferson	1st	James Gifford	Democrat	
Jefferson	2nd	DeWitt C. West	Democrat	
Jefferson	3rd	Charles Smith	Democrat	
Kings	1st	Nicholson P. O'Brien	Democrat	
Kings	2nd	George A. Searing	Democrat	
Kings	3rd	James H. Hutchins	Democrat	
Lewis		Seymour Green	Democrat	
Livingston	1st	Amos A. Hendee	Whig	
Livingston	2nd	Abram Lozier	Whig	
Madison	1st	Dennis Hardin	Whig	
Madison	2nd	Marsena Temple	Democrat	
Monroe	1st	Lyman Payne	Whig	
Monroe	2nd	Orlando Hastings	Whig	also a Manager at the impeachment trial
Monroe	3rd	James O. Pettingill	Whig	
Montgomery	1st	William McClary	Democrat	
Montgomery	2nd	Abram N. Van Alstine	Democrat	
New York	1st	Frederick W. C. Wedekind	Democrat	
New York	2nd	Henry H. Howard	Democrat	
New York	3rd	Joseph Rose Jr.*	Democrat	
New York	4th	Robert D. Livingston	Democrat	
New York	5th	George F. Alden	Democrat	
New York	6th	Bartholomew T. Gilmore	Democrat	
New York	7th	Jacob S. Miller	Democrat	
New York	8th	Moses D. Gale*	Democrat	
New York	9th	Erastus W. Glover	Democrat	
New York	10th	Henry Shaw	Democrat	
New York	11th	David O'Keefe Jr.*	Democrat	
New York	12th	Daniel B. Taylor	Democrat	
New York	13th	William Taylor*	Whig	
New York	14th	Solomon B. Noble	Democrat	also a Manager at the impeachment trial
New York	15th	Thomas P. St. John*	Democrat	
New York	16th	Russell Smith	Democrat	on July 1, elected Speaker pro tempore
Niagara	1st	George W. Holley	Whig	
Niagara	2nd	Reuben F. Wilson	Democrat	
Oneida	1st	Dexter Gilmore	Democrat	
Oneida	2nd	Amos O. Osborn	Whig	
Oneida	3rd	Julius C. Thorne	Democrat	
Oneida	4th	Amos C. Hall	Democrat	
Onondaga	1st	Alonzo Case	Democrat	
Onondaga	2nd	Samuel S. Kneeland	Whig	
Onondaga	3rd	Daniel P. Wood	Whig	also a Manager at the impeachment trial
Onondaga	4th	Isaac V. V. Hibbard	Democrat	
Ontario	1st	Marcus Persons	Whig	
Ontario	2nd	Hiram Ashley	Whig	
Orange	1st	Thomas Fulton	Democrat	
Orange	2nd	Hudson Webb	Democrat	
Orange	3rd	Ethan B. Carpenter	Democrat	
Orleans		Silas M. Burroughs	Independent	
Oswego	1st	DeWitt C. Littlejohn	Whig	
Oswego	2nd	Charles A. Perkins	Whig	
Otsego	1st	Charles McLean	Democrat	
Otsego	2nd	Jenks S. Sprague	Democrat	
Otsego	3rd	John C. Spafard	Democrat	
Putnam		Nathan A. Howes*	Democrat	
Queens		Sylvanus S. Smith*	Democrat	
Rensselaer	1st	Jason C. Osgood	Democrat	
Rensselaer	2nd	Charles B. Stratton	Whig	
Rensselaer	3rd	Peter G. Ten Eyck	Democrat	
Richmond		Henry Dehart	Democrat	
Rockland		Nicholas C. Blauvelt	Democrat	
St. Lawrence	1st	Barnabas Hall	Democrat	
St. Lawrence	2nd	Benjamin Smith*	Democrat	
St. Lawrence	3rd	Parker W. Rose*	Democrat	
Saratoga	1st	Willam Cary	Whig	
Saratoga	2nd	Henry Holmes	Whig	
Schenectady		William Van Vranken	Democrat	
Schoharie	1st	Luman Reed	Whig	
Schoharie	2nd	John Westover	Democrat	
Seneca		Sterling G. Hadley	Democrat	
Steuben	1st	Dryden Henderson	Democrat	
Steuben	2nd	John McBurney	Democrat	also a Manager at the impeachment trial
Steuben	3rd	Henry H. Bouton	Democrat	
Suffolk	1st	Abraham H. Gardiner	Democrat	
Suffolk	2nd	William H. Ludlow	Democrat	elected Speaker
Sullivan		James K. Gardner	Democrat	
Tioga		Thomas I. Chatfield	Whig	
Tompkins	1st	David Crocker Jr.	Democrat	
Tompkins	2nd	Ebenezer S. Marsh	Democrat	
Ulster	1st	John Lounsbury	Democrat	
Ulster	2nd	L. Harrison Smith	Democrat	
Warren		Richard P. Smith	Democrat	
Washington	1st	Charles R. Ingalls	Democrat	
Washington	2nd	Samuel S. Beman	Whig	
Wayne	1st	Benjamin H. Streeter	Democrat	
Wayne	2nd	Loammi Whitcomb	Whig	
Westchester	1st	George C. Finch	Democrat	
Westchester	2nd	Jacob Odell	Democrat	
Wyoming		Alonzo B. Rose	Whig	
Yates		DeWitt C. Stanford	Whig	

=== Employees ===
- Clerk: John S. Nafew
- Sergeant-at-Arms: John P. Phelps
- Doorkeeper: George D. Wooldridge
- First Assistant Doorkeeper: Hugh Clary
- Second Assistant Doorkeeper: S. A. Brown

== Sources ==
- The New York Civil List compiled by Franklin Benjamin Hough (Weed, Parsons and Co., 1858) [pg. 109 for Senate districts; pg. 137 for senators; pg. 148–157 for Assembly districts; pg. 244ff for assemblymen]
- Journal of the Senate (76th Session) (1853)
- Journal of the Assembly (76th Session) (1853; Vol. I)
- Journal of the Assembly (76th Session) (1853; Vol. II)
- The State Government for 1853 in NYT on January 5, 1853
