= Senator Hubbell =

Senator Hubbell may refer to:

- Alrick Hubbell (1801–1877), New York State Senate
- Don Lorenzo Hubbell (1853–1930), Arizona State Senate
- J. Lorenzo Hubbell (1853–1930), Arizona State Senate
- James Randolph Hubbell (1824–1890), Ohio State Senate
- Jay Hubbell (1829–1900), Michigan State Senate
