= 77th New York State Legislature =

New York state legislative session

←	76th	78th	→
- The Old State Capitol (1879)

Overview
- Legislative body: New York State Legislature
- Jurisdiction: New York, United States
- Term: January 1 – December 31, 1854

Senate
- Members: 32
- President: Lt. Gov. Sanford E. Church (D)
- Temporary President: Andrew B. Dickinson (W), from January 30
- Party control: Whig (23-9)

Assembly
- Members: 128
- Speaker: Robert H. Pruyn (W)
- Party control: Whig (80-25-18-5)

Sessions
- 1st: January 3 – April 17, 1854

The 77th New York State Legislature, consisting of the New York State Senate and the New York State Assembly, met from January 3 to April 17, 1854, during the second year of Horatio Seymour's governorship, in Albany.

== Background ==
Under the provisions of the New York Constitution of 1846, 32 Senators were elected in single-seat senatorial districts for a two-year term, the whole Senate being renewed biennially. The senatorial districts (except those in New York City) were made up of entire counties. 128 Assemblymen were elected in single-seat districts to a one-year term, the whole Assembly being renewed annually. The Assembly districts were made up of entire towns, or city wards, forming a contiguous area, all in the same county. The City and County of New York was divided into four senatorial districts, and 16 Assembly districts.

At this time there were two major political parties: the Democratic Party and the Whig Party.

The Democratic Party was split into two factions: the Hard-Shells (or Hards) and the Soft-Shells (or Softs). In 1848, the Democratic Party had been split into Barnburners and Hunkers. The Barnburners left the party, and ran as the Free Soil Party, with presidential candidate Martin Van Buren. Afterwards the larger part of the Free Soilers re-joined the Democratic Party. During the following years, the Hunkers split over the question of reconciliation with the Barnburners. The Hards were against it, denying the Barnburners to gain influence in the Party. The Softs favored reconciliation with the intention of maintaining enough strength to win the elections. Both Hards and Softs favored a compromise on the slavery question: to maintain the status quo and to leave the decision to the local population in new Territories or States if they want slavery or not, as expressed in the Kansas-Nebraska Act. The Barnburners were against the permission of slavery in new Territories or States, but were now the minority in the party. The small faction of the Free Soil Party which advocated abolition of slavery, ran their own State ticket as the "Free Democratic Party".

About this time the Temperance movement began to enter politics to advocate legal and/or political measures to prohibit the sale of alcoholic beverages, and endorsed candidates of the major parties who favored prohibition.

== Elections ==
The 1853 New York state election was held on November 8. Due to the Democratic split, of the ten statewide elective offices up for election, eight were carried by the Whigs, and two by the Democrats. The approximate statewide party strength, as shown by the vote for Secretary of State, was: Whig 160,000; Hard 99,000; Soft 96,000; and Free Democrats 14,000.

== Sessions ==
The Legislature met for the regular session at the Old State Capitol in Albany on January 3, 1854; and adjourned on April 17.

Robert H. Pruyn (W) was elected Speaker with 74 votes against 24 for George De Witt Clinton (Hard) and 17 for Jonathan C. Collins (Soft).

On January 20, the Legislature passed "An Act to perfect an amendment of the Constitution, providing means for the completion of the canals of this State".

On January 30, Andrew B. Dickinson (W) was elected president pro tempore of the State Senate.

On February 15, a special election was held at which the Canal Amendment was ratified by the voters with 185,771 votes For; and 60,526 votes Against the proposed amendment.

On April 4, the Legislature elected Victor M. Rice (W) as the first State Superintendent of Public Instruction.

== State Senate ==
=== Districts ===
- 1st District: Queens, Richmond and Suffolk counties
- 2nd District: Kings County
- 3rd District: 1st, 2nd, 3rd, 4th, 5th and 6th wards of New York City
- 4th District: 7th, 10th, 13th and 17th wards of New York City
- 5th District: 8th, 9th and 14th wards of New York City
- 6th District: 11th, 12th, 15th, 16th, 18th, 19th, 20th, 21st and 22nd wards of New York City
- 7th District: Putnam, Rockland and Westchester counties
- 8th District: Columbia and Dutchess counties
- 9th District: Orange and Sullivan counties
- 10th District: Greene and Ulster counties
- 11th District: Albany and Schenectady counties
- 12th District: Rensselaer County
- 13th District: Saratoga and Washington counties
- 14th District: Clinton, Essex and Warren counties
- 15th District: Franklin and St. Lawrence counties
- 16th District: Fulton, Hamilton, Herkimer and Montgomery counties
- 17th District: Delaware and Schoharie counties
- 18th District: Chenango and Otsego counties
- 19th District: Oneida County
- 20th District: Madison and Oswego counties
- 21st District: Jefferson and Lewis counties
- 22nd District: Onondaga County
- 23rd District: Broome, Cortland and Tioga counties
- 24th District: Cayuga and Wayne counties
- 25th District: Seneca, Tompkins and Yates counties
- 26th District: Chemung and Steuben counties
- 27th District: Monroe County
- 28th District: Genesee, Niagara and Orleans counties
- 29th District: Livingston and Ontario counties
- 30th District: Allegany and Wyoming counties
- 31st District: Erie County
- 32nd District: Cattaraugus and Chautauqua counties
Note: There are now 62 counties in the State of New York. The counties which are not mentioned in this list had not yet been established, or sufficiently organized, the area being included in one or more of the abovementioned counties.

=== Members ===
The asterisk (*) denotes members of the previous Legislature who continued in office as members of this Legislature. James H. Hutchins changed from the Assembly to the Senate.

District	Senator	Party	Notes
1st	Hugh Halsey	Dem.-Hard/Temp.	
2nd	James H. Hutchins*	Dem.-Hard	
3rd	Thomas J. Barr	Dem.-Hard	
4th	Thomas R. Whitney	Whig	on November 7, 1854, elected to the 34th U.S. Congress
5th	Mark Spencer	Dem.-Soft	
6th	Erastus Brooks	Whig	
7th	William H. Robertson	Whig	
8th	Robert A. Barnard	Whig	
9th	John D. Watkins	Dem	
10th	Eliakim Sherrill	Whig	
11th	Clarkson F. Crosby	Whig	
12th	Elisha N. Pratt	Whig	
13th	James C. Hopkins	Whig	also Postmaster of Granville
14th	George Richards	Whig	
15th	Zenas Clark	Dem.-Soft	
16th	George Yost	Whig	
17th	Peter S. Danforth	Dem.-Hard	
18th	Ebenezer Blakely	Whig	contested; vacated on March 14
18th	Adam Storing	Democrat	seated on March 14
19th	Daniel G. Dorrance	Whig	
20th	Simon C. Hitchcock	Democrat	
21st	Robert Lansing	Democrat	
22nd	James Munroe*	Whig	
23rd	George W. Bradford	Whig	
24th	William Clark	Whig	
25th	Josiah B. Williams*	Whig	
26th	Andrew B. Dickinson	Whig	on January 30, elected president pro tempore
27th	William S. Bishop	Whig	
28th	Ben Field	Whig	
29th	Myron H. Clark*	Whig	on November 7, 1854, elected Governor of New York
30th	Martin Butts	Whig	
31st	James O. Putnam	Whig	
32nd	Alvah H. Walker	Whig	

=== Employees ===
- Clerk: Hugh J. Hastings
- Sergeant-at-Arms: Joseph Garlinghouse
- Assistant Sergeant-at-Arms: Hiram M. Eaton
- Doorkeeper: Samuel R. Tuell
- Assistant Doorkeeper: Almond Becker

== State Assembly ==
=== Assemblymen ===
The asterisk (*) denotes members of the previous Legislature who continued as members of this Legislature.

Party affiliations follow the vote on Speaker.

District		Assemblymen	Party	Notes
Albany	1st	Stephen M. Hollenbeck	Dem.-Hard	
Albany	2nd	Israhiah W. Chesebro	Whig	
Albany	3rd	Robert H. Pruyn	Whig	elected Speaker
Albany	4th	Archibald A. Dunlop	Whig	
Allegany	1st	Gideon H. Jenkins	Whig	
Allegany	2nd	Lucius S. May	Whig	
Broome		Robert Harpur	Whig	
Cattaraugus	1st	William H. Wood	Whig	took his seat on January 9
Cattaraugus	2nd	James Kirkland	Whig	
Cayuga	1st	Justus Townsend	Whig	
Cayuga	2nd	Mosely Hutchinson	Whig	
Cayuga	3rd	Mathias Hutchinson*	Whig	
Chautauqua	1st	Walter L. Sessions*	Whig	
Chautauqua	2nd	Francis W. Palmer	Whig	
Chemung		John M. Randall	Dem.-Soft	
Chenango	1st	Levi Harris	Whig	
Chenango	2nd	Rufus J. Baldwin	Whig	
Clinton		George V. Hoyle*	Whig	
Columbia	1st	Milton Martin	Whig	
Columbia	2nd	Harvey W. Gott	Whig	
Cortland		Perrin H. McGraw	Whig	
Delaware	1st	Samuel F. Miller	Dem.-Soft	
Delaware	2nd	Daniel Rowland	Dem.-Soft	
Dutchess	1st	Peter P. Monfort	Whig	died on February 26, 1854
Dutchess	2nd	George W. Sterling	Free Dem./Temp.	
Dutchess	3rd	William H. Bostwick	Dem.-Hard	
Erie	1st	William W. Weed	Whig	
Erie	2nd	Rollin Germain	Whig	
Erie	3rd	Charles A. Sill	Whig	
Erie	4th	Edward N. Hatch	Whig	
Essex		Jonathan Burnet*	Whig	
Franklin		Andrew W. Ferguson	Dem.-Soft	
Fulton and Hamilton		Wesley Gleason	Whig	
Genesee	1st	Theodore C. Peters*	Whig	
Genesee	2nd	Joseph Cook*	Whig	
Greene	1st	Joshua Fiero Jr.	Whig	
Greene	2nd	George Robertson	Whig	
Herkimer	1st	Gardner Hinkley	Dem.-Soft	
Herkimer	2nd	Dean Burgess	Dem.-Soft	
Jefferson	1st	Calvin Littlefield	Whig	
Jefferson	2nd	Alden Adams	Whig	contested; vacated on February 3
Jefferson	2nd	Jesse E. Willis		seated on February 3
Jefferson	3rd	William Dewey	Whig	
Kings	1st	John G. Bergen	Whig	
Kings	2nd	Samuel D. Backus	Whig	
Kings	3rd	Samuel D. Morris	Dem.-Hard	
Lewis		Jonathan C. Collins	Dem.-Soft	
Livingston	1st	Leman Gibbs	Dem.-Hard	
Livingston	2nd	Abram Lozier*	Whig	
Madison	1st	Samuel White 2nd	Dem.-Hard	
Madison	2nd	Franklin M. Whitman	Dem.-Hard	
Monroe	1st	Lyman Payne*	Whig	
Monroe	2nd	James L. Angel	Whig	
Monroe	3rd	Pliny B. Holdridge	Whig	
Montgomery	1st	Aaron W. Hull	Whig	
Montgomery	2nd	Hezekiah Baker	Whig	
New York	1st	Peter H. Graham	Whig	
New York	2nd	George De Witt Clinton	Dem.-Hard	
New York	3rd	Daniel W. Clarke	Dem.-Soft	contested; vacated on February 18
New York	3rd	Patrick H. Maguire	Dem.-Hard	seated on February 18
New York	4th	Theodore A. Ward	Whig	
New York	5th	Edmund P. Barrow	Whig	
New York	6th	William B. Aitken	Dem.-Hard	
New York	7th	Charles C. Leigh	Dem.-Soft	
New York	8th	George H. Richards	Dem.-Soft	
New York	9th	Daniel Willis	Whig	
New York	10th	Joseph W. Savage	Whig	
New York	11th	James M. Boyd	Whig	
New York	12th	Peter Dawson	Dem.-Soft	
New York	13th	Frederick A. Conkling	Whig	
New York	14th	John P. Cumming	Whig	
New York	15th	Edward A. Ware	Whig	
New York	16th	Alexander P. Sharp	Whig	"Independent Whig", but voted for Pruyn
Niagara	1st	Robert Dunlap	Dem.-Hard	
Niagara	2nd	Reuben F. Wilson*	Dem.-Hard	
Oneida	1st	Joseph Benedict	Whig	
Oneida	2nd	A. Pierson Case	Whig	
Oneida	3rd	Derick L. Boardman	Whig	
Oneida	4th	James Mitchell	Whig	
Onondaga	1st	James M. Munro	Free Dem.	
Onondaga	2nd	Milton A. Kinney	Whig	
Onondaga	3rd	Daniel P. Wood*	Whig	
Onondaga	4th	William Richardson	Whig	
Ontario	1st	Jesse Cost	Whig	
Ontario	2nd	Stephen V. R. Mallory	Whig	took his seat on January 16
Orange	1st	Charles W. Cushman	Dem.-Hard	
Orange	2nd	Charles M. Thompson	Dem.-Hard	
Orange	3rd	Andrew J. Mills	Dem.-Hard	
Orleans		Jeremiah Freeman	Whig	
Oswego	1st	DeWitt C. Littlejohn*	Whig	
Oswego	2nd	Azariah Wart	Dem.-Soft	
Otsego	1st	Lewis Whipple	Whig	
Otsego	2nd	Andrew A. Mather	Free Dem.	
Otsego	3rd	St. Paul Seeley	Dem.-Soft	
Putnam		James J. Smalley	Dem.-Hard	
Queens		John A. Searing	Dem.-Hard	
Rensselaer	1st	Jonathan Edwards	Whig	
Rensselaer	2nd	Lyman Wilder	Dem.-Soft	
Rensselaer	3rd	George Brust	Dem.-Hard	
Richmond		Nicholas Crocheron	Whig	
Rockland		John I. Suffern	Dem.-Hard/Temp	
St. Lawrence	1st	Barnabas Hall*	Dem.-Soft	
St. Lawrence	2nd	Silas Baldwin	Whig	
St. Lawrence	3rd	Levi Miller	Dem.-Soft	
Saratoga	1st	George W. Neilson	Whig	
Saratoga	2nd	Joseph Baucus	Dem.-Hard	
Schenectady		Matthew Winne Jr.	Whig	
Schoharie	1st	Jacob J. Barton	Dem.-Hard	
Schoharie	2nd	James S. Wood	Dem.-Hard	
Seneca		David D. Scott	Whig	
Steuben	1st	John F. Williams	Dem.-Soft	
Steuben	2nd	Benajah P. Bailey	Whig	
Steuben	3rd	Obadiah Stephens	Whig	
Suffolk	1st	George Miller	Whig/Temp.	
Suffolk	2nd	William S. Preston	Dem.-Hard	
Sullivan		Amos Y. Sheeley	Dem.-Hard	
Tioga		Lewis P. Legg	Dem.-Soft	
Tompkins	1st	Benjamin Joy	Temperance	
Tompkins	2nd	Eli Beers	Whig	
Ulster	1st	Meeker Gorham	Whig	
Ulster	2nd	John B. Howell	Free Dem.	
Warren		David Noble 2nd	Dem.-Hard	
Washington	1st	Ebenezer McMurray	Whig	
Washington	2nd	George W. Thorn	Whig	
Wayne	1st	Willis G. Wade	Whig	
Wayne	2nd	John P. Bennett	Whig	
Westchester	1st	Elijah Lee	Dem.-Hard	
Westchester	2nd	Jacob Odell*	Dem.-Hard	
Wyoming		Alonzo B. Rose*	Whig	
Yates		David G. Underwood	Whig	

=== Employees ===
- Clerk: Richard U. Sherman
- Deputy Clerk: Loren B. Sessions
- Sergeant-at-Arms: Silas D. Nicholas
- Doorkeeper: John Davis
- First Assistant Doorkeeper: Byron Ellsworth
- Second Assistant Doorkeeper: John Lewis

== Sources ==
- The New York Civil List compiled by Franklin Benjamin Hough (Weed, Parsons and Co., 1858) [pg. 109 for Senate districts; pg. 137 for senators; pg. 148–157 for Assembly districts; pg. 246ff for assemblymen]
- STATE ELECTION; LATEST RETURNS in NYT on November 12, 1853
- Journal of the Senate (77th Session) (1854)
- Journal of the Assembly (77th Session) (1854)
