= Senator McGraw =

Senator McGraw may refer to:

- Joseph McGraw (born 1930), Oklahoma State Senate
- Perrin H. McGraw (1822–1899), New York State Senate
- Warren McGraw (1939–2023), West Virginia State Senate

== See also ==
- Senator McGrew (disambiguation)
