= Senator Bristol =

Senator Bristol may refer to:

- Nathan Bristol (1805–1874), New York State Senate
- Wheeler H. Bristol (1818–1904), Florida State Senate
- William Bristol (1779–1836), Connecticut State Senate
