= 78th New York State Legislature =

New York state legislative session

←	77th	79th	→
- The Old State Capitol (1879)

Overview
- Legislative body: New York State Legislature
- Jurisdiction: New York, United States
- Term: January 1 – December 31, 1855

Senate
- Members: 32
- President: Lt. Gov. Henry J. Raymond (W)
- Temporary President: Josiah B. Williams (W), from January 22
- Party control: Whig (18-10-4)

Assembly
- Members: 128
- Speaker: DeWitt C. Littlejohn (W)
- Party control: Whig

Sessions
- 1st: January 2 – April 14, 1855

The 78th New York State Legislature, consisting of the New York State Senate and the New York State Assembly, met from January 2 to April 14, 1855, during the first year of Myron H. Clark's governorship, in Albany.

== Background ==
Under the provisions of the New York Constitution of 1846, 32 Senators were elected in single-seat senatorial districts for a two-year term, the whole Senate being renewed biennially. The senatorial districts (except those in New York City) were made up of entire counties. 128 Assemblymen were elected in single-seat districts to a one-year term, the whole Assembly being renewed annually. The Assembly districts were made up of entire towns, or city wards, forming a contiguous area, all in the same county. The City and County of New York was divided into four senatorial districts, and 16 Assembly districts.

At this time there were two major political parties: the Democratic Party and the Whig Party.

The Democratic Party was split into two factions: the Hard-Shells (or Hards) and the Soft-Shells (or Softs). In 1848, the Democratic Party had been split into Barnburners and Hunkers. The Barnburners left the party, and ran as the Free Soil Party, with presidential candidate Martin Van Buren. Afterwards the larger part of the Free Soilers re-joined the Democratic Party. During the following years, the Hunkers split over the question of reconciliation with the Barnburners. The Hards were against it, denying the Barnburners to gain influence in the Party. The Softs favored reconciliation with the intention of maintaining enough strength to win the elections. Both Hards and Softs favored a compromise on the slavery question: to maintain the status quo and to leave the decision to the local population in new Territories or States if they want slavery or not, as expressed in the Kansas-Nebraska Act. The Barnburners were against the permission of slavery in new Territories or States, but were now the minority in the party. The small faction of the Free Soil Party which advocated abolition of slavery, now known as the "Free Democratic Party", endorsed the Whig nominees Clark and Raymnond.

The Whig Party was in the process of disintegrating. The radical anti-slavery Whigs formed the Anti-Nebraska Party, the moderate anti-slavery wing became the Republican Party in other States, but still retained the Whig label in New York. Most of the Whigs which favored a compromise, or preferred to sidestep the issue, joined the Know Nothing movement which ran as the American Party.

About this time the Temperance movement began to enter politics to advocate legal and/or political measures to prohibit the sale of alcoholic beverages, and endorsed candidates of the major parties who favored prohibition. At this election, they endorsed the Whig nominees Clark and Raymond.

== Elections ==
The 1854 New York state election was held on November 7. Due to the Democratic split, the whole Whig ticket was elected. State Senator Myron H. Clark and New York Times publisher Henry J. Raymond were elected Governor and Lieutenant Governor. Clark defeated the incumbent Gov. Horatio Seymour (Soft) by a plurality of only 309 votes. The approximate party strength at this election, as expressed by the vote on Governor was: Whig/Anti-Nebraska/Temperance/Free Democratic/Anti-Rent fusion 156,800; Soft 156,500; American 122,000, and Hard 34,000.

== Sessions ==
The Legislature met for the regular session at the Old State Capitol in Albany on January 2, 1855; and adjourned on April 14.

DeWitt C. Littlejohn (W) was elected Speaker.

On January 22, Josiah B. Williams (W) was elected president pro tempore of the State Senate.

On February 6, the Legislature re-elected U.S. Senator William H. Seward (W) to a second six-year term, beginning on March 4, 1855.

On March 2, Richard M. Blatchford (W) was elected Speaker pro tempore of the Assembly.

On April 9, the Legislature passed "An Act for the prevention of Intemperance, Pauperism and Crime", thus enacting Prohibition. The law was declared unconstitutional in March 1856 by the New York Court of Appeals, thus repealing Prohibition.

== State Senate ==
=== Districts ===
- 1st District: Queens, Richmond and Suffolk counties
- 2nd District: Kings County
- 3rd District: 1st, 2nd, 3rd, 4th, 5th and 6th wards of New York City
- 4th District: 7th, 10th, 13th and 17th wards of New York City
- 5th District: 8th, 9th and 14th wards of New York City
- 6th District: 11th, 12th, 15th, 16th, 18th, 19th, 20th, 21st and 22nd wards of New York City
- 7th District: Putnam, Rockland and Westchester counties
- 8th District: Columbia and Dutchess counties
- 9th District: Orange and Sullivan counties
- 10th District: Greene and Ulster counties
- 11th District: Albany and Schenectady counties
- 12th District: Rensselaer County
- 13th District: Saratoga and Washington counties
- 14th District: Clinton, Essex and Warren counties
- 15th District: Franklin and St. Lawrence counties
- 16th District: Fulton, Hamilton, Herkimer and Montgomery counties
- 17th District: Delaware and Schoharie counties
- 18th District: Chenango and Otsego counties
- 19th District: Oneida County
- 20th District: Madison and Oswego counties
- 21st District: Jefferson and Lewis counties
- 22nd District: Onondaga County
- 23rd District: Broome, Cortland and Tioga counties
- 24th District: Cayuga and Wayne counties
- 25th District: Seneca, Tompkins and Yates counties
- 26th District: Chemung and Steuben counties
- 27th District: Monroe County
- 28th District: Genesee, Niagara and Orleans counties
- 29th District: Livingston and Ontario counties
- 30th District: Allegany and Wyoming counties
- 31st District: Erie County
- 32nd District: Cattaraugus and Chautauqua counties
Note: There are now 62 counties in the State of New York. The counties which are not mentioned in this list had not yet been established, or sufficiently organized, the area being included in one or more of the abovementioned counties.

=== Members ===
The asterisk (*) denotes members of the previous Legislature who continued in office as members of this Legislature.

Party affiliations follow the vote on U.S. Senator.

District	Senator	Party	Notes
1st	Hugh Halsey*	Dem.-Hard	
2nd	James H. Hutchins*	Dem.-Hard	
3rd	Thomas J. Barr*	Dem.-Hard	
4th	Thomas R. Whitney*	American	on November 7, 1854, elected to the 34th U.S. Congress
5th	Mark Spencer*	Dem.-Soft	
6th	Erastus Brooks*	American	
7th	William H. Robertson*	Whig	
8th	Robert A. Barnard*	Whig	
9th	John D. Watkins*	Dem.-Hard	
10th	Eliakim Sherrill*	Whig	
11th	Clarkson F. Crosby*	Whig	
12th	Elisha N. Pratt*	Whig	
13th	James C. Hopkins*	Whig	also Postmaster of Granville
14th	George Richards*	Whig	
15th	Zenas Clark*	Dem.-Soft	
16th	George Yost*	Whig	
17th	Peter S. Danforth*	Dem.-Hard	
18th	Adam Storing*	Democrat	
19th	Daniel G. Dorrance*	Whig	
20th	Simon C. Hitchcock*	Democrat	
21st	Robert Lansing*	Democrat	
22nd	James Munroe*	Whig	
23rd	George W. Bradford*	Whig	
24th	William Clark*	Whig	
25th	Josiah B. Williams*	Whig	on January 22, elected president pro tempore
26th	Andrew B. Dickinson*	Whig	
27th	William S. Bishop*	Whig	
28th	Ben Field*	Whig	
29th	William H. Goodwin	American	elected to fill vacancy, in place of Myron H. Clark: took his seat on February 5
30th	Martin Butts*	Whig	
31st	James O. Putnam*	American	
32nd	Alvah H. Walker*	Whig	

=== Employees ===
- Clerk: Hugh J. Hastings
- Sergeant-at-Arms: Joseph Garlinghouse
- Assistant Sergeant-at-Arms: Hiram M. Eaton
- Doorkeeper: Samuel R. Tuell
- Assistant Doorkeeper: Almond Becker

== State Assembly ==
=== Assemblymen ===
The asterisk (*) denotes members of the previous Legislature who continued as members of this Legislature.

Party affiliations follow the vote on U.S. Senator.

District		Assemblymen	Party	Notes
Albany	1st	Pryse Campbell		
Albany	2nd	Martin J. Blessing	American	
Albany	3rd	Alexander Davidson	Whig	
Albany	4th	James B. Van Etten	American	previously a member from Chemung Co.
Allegany	1st	Lucien B. Johnson	Whig	
Allegany	2nd	Lucius S. May*	Whig	
Broome		Charles McKinney	Whig	
Cattaraugus	1st	Alexander Storrs	Dem.-Hard	
Cattaraugus	2nd	James Kirkland*	Whig	
Cayuga	1st	Moore Conger	Dem.-Soft	
Cayuga	2nd	David L. Dodge	Democrat	
Cayuga	3rd	William B. Woodin	Whig	
Chautauqua	1st	Samuel S. Whallon	American	voted for Dix; on November 6, 1855, elected a Canal Commissioner
Chautauqua	2nd	Francis W. Palmer*	American	
Chemung		Orrin Robinson	Whig	
Chenango	1st	Daniel Palmer	Whig	
Chenango	2nd	Lewis Fairchild	Whig	
Clinton		Josiah T. Everest	Whig	
Columbia	1st	David Rhoda	Whig	
Columbia	2nd	Elisha W. Bushnell	Whig	
Cortland		John H. Knapp	Whig	
Delaware	1st	William B. Smith	Dem.-Soft	
Delaware	2nd	Ezekiel Miller	Whig	
Dutchess	1st	Albert Emans	American	
Dutchess	2nd	Joseph E. Allen	Dem.-Hard	
Dutchess	3rd	Ambrose Wager	Dem.-Soft	
Erie	1st	William W. Weed*	American	
Erie	2nd	Daniel Devening Jr.	Dem.-Soft	
Erie	3rd	Lorenzo D. Covey	Dem.-Hard	
Erie	4th	Seth W. Goddard	American	
Essex		Nathaniel C. Boynton	Whig	
Franklin		Edward Fitch	Whig	
Fulton and Hamilton		Wesley Gleason*	Whig	
Genesee	1st	Ambrose Stevens	Dem.-Hard	
Genesee	2nd	David Mallory	Whig	
Greene	1st	Martin L. Rickerson	Whig	
Greene	2nd	John C. Palmer	Free Dem.	
Herkimer	1st	Edmund G. Chapin	Free Dem.	
Herkimer	2nd	William Bridenbecker	Dem.-Soft	
Jefferson	1st	Calvin Littlefield*	Whig	
Jefferson	2nd	Moses Eames	Whig	
Jefferson	3rd	Joshua Main	Whig	
Kings	1st	Augustus H. Ivans	Dem.-Hard	unsuccessfully contested by David S. Mills
Kings	2nd	George A. Searing	Dem.-Hard	
Kings	3rd	John H. Rhodes	American	
Lewis		Aaron Parsons	Dem.-Soft	
Livingston	1st	Lyman Odell	Dem.-Hard	
Livingston	2nd	McNiel Seymour	Dem.-Hard	
Madison	1st	Gilbert Tompkins	Whig	
Madison	2nd	Aaron B. Brush	Whig	
Monroe	1st	Benjamin Smith	Whig	
Monroe	2nd	John W. Stebbins	Whig	
Monroe	3rd	Nehemiah P. Stanton Jr.	Free Dem.	
Montgomery	1st	Aaron W. Hull*	Whig	
Montgomery	2nd	Hezekiah Baker*	Whig	
New York	1st	David O'Keefe	Dem.-Soft	
New York	2nd	Robert B. Coleman	Whig	
New York	3rd	Patrick H. Maguire*	Dem.-Hard	voted for Seward
New York	4th	John D. Dixon	Dem.-Hard	
New York	5th	Edwin L. Smith	Dem.-Soft	
New York	6th	William B. Aitken*	Dem.-Hard	
New York	7th	Charles C. Leigh*	Dem.-Soft	voted for Seward
New York	8th	Theodore Stuyvesant	Whig	
New York	9th	Robert J. Jimmerson	Whig	
New York	10th	Nicholas Seagrist	Dem.-Soft	
New York	11th	Joseph H. Petty	American	
New York	12th	William G. McLaughlin	Dem.-Soft	
New York	13th	Richard M. Blatchford	Whig	on March 2, elected Speaker pro tempore
New York	14th	Thomas J. Munday	Dem.-Hard	
New York	15th	Aras G. Williams	American	
New York	16th	John S. Cocks	American	
Niagara	1st	Linus Jones Peck	American	
Niagara	2nd	Ira Tompkins	Whig	
Oneida	1st	George D. Williams	Whig	
Oneida	2nd	Levi Blakeslee	Whig	
Oneida	3rd	Hezekiah H. Beecher	Whig	
Oneida	4th	Daniel Walker	Whig	
Onondaga	1st	James M. Munro*	Free Dem.	voted for Seward
Onondaga	2nd	William J. Machan	Whig	
Onondaga	3rd	Dudley P. Phelps	Whig	
Onondaga	4th	Joshua V. H. Clark	Whig	
Ontario	1st	William H. Lamport	American	
Ontario	2nd	Oliver Case	Democrat	
Orange	1st	Joel T. Headley	American/Temp.	on November 6, 1855, elected Secretary of State of New York
Orange	2nd	Samuel Beyea	Whig	
Orange	3rd	James Bennett	Whig	
Orleans		Elisha S. Whalen	American	Assemblyman-elect Alexis Ward died on November 28, 1854; Whalen elected to fill the vacancy on December 26, 1854
Oswego	1st	DeWitt C. Littlejohn*	Whig	elected Speaker
Oswego	2nd	Jacob M. Selden	Free Dem.	contested, vacated on March 8
Oswego	2nd	Andrew S. Warner		seated on March 8
Otsego	1st	Henry H. Davy	Dem.-Soft	
Otsego	2nd	Alonzo Churchill	Whig	
Otsego	3rd	William Comstock	Whig	
Putnam		James J. Smalley*	Dem.-Hard	
Queens		James Rider	Free Dem.	
Rensselaer	1st	Jonathan Edwards*	Whig	
Rensselaer	2nd	Nicholas M. Masters	Democrat	
Rensselaer	3rd	Edmond Cole	Whig	
Richmond		John F. Raymond	Whig	
Rockland		John W. Ferdon	American	
St. Lawrence	1st	Asaph Green	Free Dem.	
St. Lawrence	2nd	Silas Baldwin*	Whig	
St. Lawrence	3rd	Levi Miller*	Dem.-Soft	
Saratoga	1st	Cornelius Schuyler	Whig	
Saratoga	2nd	John Terhune	Whig	
Schenectady		James Donnan	Whig	
Schoharie	1st	Wilkinson Wilsey	Whig	
Schoharie	2nd	Joseph H. Ramsey	Whig	
Seneca		Daniel S. Kendig	American	
Steuben	1st	Seth B. Cole	Whig	
Steuben	2nd	Sylvester Smith	Whig	
Steuben	3rd	Peter C. Ward	Dem.-Soft	
Suffolk	1st	John E. Chester	American	
Suffolk	2nd	David Platt	Whig	
Sullivan		William H. Buckley	Dem.-Hard	
Tioga		Carlisle P. Johnson	Whig	
Tompkins	1st	Frederick S. Dumont	Whig	
Tompkins	2nd	Justus P. Pennoyer	Whig	
Ulster	1st	Theodore B. Gates	American	
Ulster	2nd	Asa S. Wygant	American	
Warren		Reuben Wells	Whig	
Washington	1st	James I. Lourie	Whig	
Washington	2nd	Justin A. Smith	Democrat	
Wayne	1st	James T. Wisner	Whig	
Wayne	2nd	John P. Bennett*	Whig	
Westchester	1st	Daniel Hunt	Whig	
Westchester	2nd	Frederick W. Waterbury	American	voted for Dickinson
Wyoming		John C. Paine	Whig	
Yates		Jacob B. Van Osdol	Whig	

=== Employees ===
- Clerk: Richard U. Sherman
- Sergeant-at-Arms: Byron Ellsworth
- Doorkeeper: Harmon Groesbeck
- First Assistant Doorkeeper: Samuel Hall
- Second Assistant Doorkeeper: William Buttro

== Sources ==
- The New York Civil List compiled by Franklin Benjamin Hough (Weed, Parsons and Co., 1858) [pg. 109 for Senate districts; pg. 137 for senators; pg. 148–157 for Assembly districts; pg. 248ff for assemblymen]
- Journal of the Senate (78th Session) (1855)
- Journal of the Assembly (78th Session) (1855; Vol. 2)
