= Senator Hutchins =

Senator Hutchins may refer to:

- Bill Hutchins (born 1931), Iowa State Senate
- James H. Hutchins, New York State Senate

== See also ==
- Lynn Hutchings (born 1960), Wyoming State Senate
