= George T. Pierce =

American lawyer and politician

George T. Pierce (c. 1823 in Pawling, Dutchess County, New York – 1874) was an American lawyer and politician from New York.

== Life ==
He graduated from Yale College in 1843, and then studied law at Harvard Law School for a year.

He was a member of the New York State Assembly (Dutchess Co.) in 1846. Afterwards he removed to a farm in Esopus, in Ulster County.

He was a member of the New York State Senate (10th D.) in 1852 and 1853. He was a member of the Barnburner faction of the Democratic Party, and joined the Republican Party upon its foundation.

He was again a member of the State Assembly (Ulster Co., 2nd D.) in 1861 and 1862.

He was one of the charter trustees of Vassar College, established in 1861, and remained on the board until 1868.

Pierce was the nephew of Thomas Taber II and first cousin of Stephen Taber, both of whom served in Congress.

== Sources ==
- The New York Civil List compiled by Franklin Benjamin Hough (pages 137, 144, 231 and 297; Weed, Parsons and Co., 1858)
- The New York Civil List compiled by Franklin Benjamin Hough, Stephen C. Hutchins and Edgar Albert Werner (1867; pages 493, 496 and 518)
- Vassar history
- Biographical Sketches of the State Officers and Members of the Legislature of the State of New York by William D. Murphy (1861; pg. 247ff) [middle initial "S." is a typo]
- Biographical Sketches of the State Officers and Members of the Legislature of the State of New York by William D. Murphy (1863; pg. 216ff)
- The Yale Literary Magazine (1843; pg. 14)

New York State Senate
Preceded by Marius Schoonmaker	New York State Senate; 10th District; 1852–1853	Succeeded by Eliakim Sherrill
New York State Assembly
Preceded by Jeremiah Clark	New York State Assembly; Ulster County, 2nd District; 1861–1862	Succeeded by Jacob LeFever
