= Elisha Ward =

American politician

Elisha Ward (June 20, 1804 Poultney, Rutland County, Vermont – January 25, 1860 Silver Creek, Chautauqua County, New York) was an American lawyer and politician from New York.

== Life ==
He was the son of William Ward (1778–1850) and Anna (Spencer) Ward (d. 1819). On May 28, 1833, he married Eliza Pease, and they had five children. In 1836, he removed to Dunkirk, New York, and in 1839 to Silver Creek. In 1840, he was appointed as an associate judge of the Chautauqua County Court.

He was a member of the New York State Assembly (Chautauqua Co.) in 1846.

He was a member of the New York State Senate (32nd D.) in 1852 and 1853.

== Sources ==
- The New York Civil List compiled by Franklin Benjamin Hough (pages 137, 147, 231 and 314; Weed, Parsons and Co., 1858)
- The William Ward Genealogy by Charles Martyn (1925; pg. 342)
- Ward Family by Andrew Henshaw Ward (Boston, 1851; pg. 207f)

New York State Senate
Preceded by Robert Owen Jr.	New York State Senate; 32nd District; 1852–1853	Succeeded by Alvah H. Walker
