= Francis R. E. Cornell =

American judge (1821–1881)

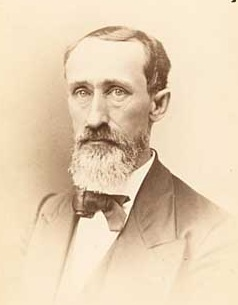
- Cornell c. 1875

Associate Justice of the Minnesota Supreme Court
- In office January 11, 1875 – May 23, 1881

4th Attorney General of Minnesota
- In office January 10, 1868 – January 9, 1874
- Preceded by: William J. Colvill
- Succeeded by: George P. Wilson

Member of the Minnesota House of Representatives from the 5th district
- In office 1861–1862, 1865

Member of the New York State Senate from the 26th district
- In office January 1, 1852 – December 31, 1853
- Preceded by: William J. Gilbert
- Succeeded by: Andrew B. Dickinson

Personal details
- Born: Francis Russell Edward Cornell; November 17, 1821 Coventry, New York, U.S.
- Died: May 23, 1881 (aged 59) Minneapolis, Minnesota, U.S.
- Education: Union College
- Occupation: Politician, lawyer, judge

Francis Russell Edward Cornell (November 17, 1821 – May 23, 1881) was an American lawyer, politician, and judge.

== Biography ==
Cornell was born in 1821 in Coventry in Chenango County, New York. He graduated from Union College in 1842 where he had been a member of Kappa Alpha Society and studied law before being admitted to the bar in 1845. A lawyer in Addison in Steuben County, he represented the 26th District in the New York State Senate from 1852 to 1853.

Cornell moved to Minneapolis, Minnesota, in 1854. Cornell served in the Minnesota House of Representatives from District 5 from 1861 to 1862 and in 1865. Cornell was elected Minnesota Attorney General in 1867 and was reelected twice, serving three terms from January 10, 1868, to January 9, 1874. Cornell was elected associate justice of the Minnesota Supreme Court in November 1874 and served from January 11, 1875, until his death on May 23, 1881, in Minneapolis.

== Legacy ==
In an article in Minnesota Law & Politics, Cornell was named as one of the "100 most influential attorneys in state history." He was noted as a pioneering trial lawyer who "established his reputation litigating the land claims that arose out of the opening of the government reservation that occupied most of the west side of the Mississippi River at the time" and as an active abolitionist who successfully argued for the freedom of a slave woman who had been brought north to accompany her owner on a visit.

== Notes ==
New York State Senate
Preceded by William J. Gilbert	New York State Senate; 26th District; 1852–1853	Succeeded by Andrew B. Dickinson
Political offices
Preceded by William J. Colvill	Minnesota Attorney General; 1868–1874	Succeeded by George P. Wilson
