= Azariah Wart =

American politician

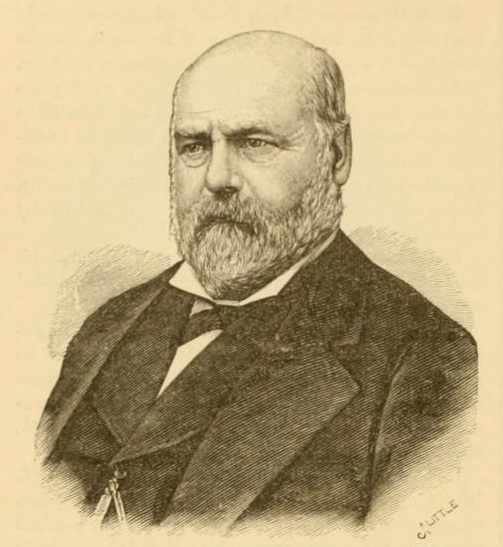
Azariah Wart (1877)

Azariah Wart (March 4, 1822 – June 16, 1900) was an American lawyer and politician from New York.

== Life ==
He was born on March 4, 1822, in that part of Orwell, which was separated in 1828 as the Town of Boylston, in Oswego County, New York. He was the son of John Wart, a farmer and Justice of the Peace, and Rachel Wart. On October 13, 1841, he married Almira Ormsby (died 1862), and they had five children. He worked on the family farm, and appeared as a counselor and advocate, especially in his father's justice's court.

Wart entered politics as a Democrat. He was Supervisor of the Town of Boylston in 1851 and 1852; a member of the New York State Assembly (Oswego Co., 2nd D.) in 1854; and again Supervisor of Boylston in 1855 and 1857.

He was admitted to the bar in 1859, and practiced law in Sandy Creek, becoming a celebrated trial lawyer. On July 26, 1863, he married Eliza Castor (1837–1908), and they had two sons. Later he was Clerk and Attorney to the Board of Supervisors of Oswego County.

He died on June 16, 1900, at his home in Sandy Creek; and was buried at the Greenboro Cemetery in Redfield, New York.

== Sources ==
New York State Assembly
Preceded by Charles A. Perkins	New York State Assembly; Oswego County, 2nd District; 1854	Succeeded by Jacob M. Selden
