= William McMurray (politician) =

American politician

William McMurray (ca. 1813 – May 30, 1868) was an American lawyer and politician from New York.

== Life ==
In 1832, McMurray was among the first students of New York University. He was a member of the New York State Assembly (New York Co.) in 1841, 1842 and 1843. He was a member of the New York State Senate (2nd D.) in 1852 and 1853. He was a member of the Board of Commissioners of the Metropolitan Police of New York City from 1864 to 1866.

On the morning of May 31, 1868, he was found dead in his bed, at his residence on Fifth Avenue. Apparently, he had died of apoplexy in his sleep.

New York State Senate
Preceded by Richard S. Williams	New York State Senate; 2nd District; 1852–1853	Succeeded by Thomas J. Barr
