= John A. McElwain =

American politician

John Allen McElwain (September 21, 1794 – March 2, 1875) was an American politician from New York.

== Life ==
McElwain was the son of Lt. John Allen McElwain (1743–1814) and Hannah (Melvin) McElwain (d. 1853). He was born on September 21, 1794, in Palmer, Massachusetts, then in Hampshire County, now in Hampden County, Massachusetts.

On March 25, 1830, he married Mary Polly Day (1811–1834), and they had a daughter. He was Sheriff of Genesee County from 1832 to 1834. In 1834, he married Lomira Sutherland (1811–1884), and they had six children.

He was a member of the New York State Assembly (Genesee Co.) in 1837.

He was Treasurer of Wyoming County from 1851 to 1853. He was a member of the New York State Senate (30th D.) in 1852 and 1853.

He and his two wives were buried at the Warsaw Cemetery in Warsaw, New York.

== Sources ==
- The New York Civil List compiled by Franklin Benjamin Hough (pages 137, 143, 219, 289, 400 and 422; Weed, Parsons and Co., 1858)
- McElwain genealogy at Angel Fire

New York State Senate
| Preceded by Charles D. Robinson | New York State Senate; 30th District; 1852–1853 | Succeeded by Martin Butts |
