= Daniel G. Dorrance =

American politician

Daniel Gordon Dorrance (March 13, 1811 Peterboro, Madison County, New York - March 26, 1896 Vernon, Oneida County, New York) was a member of thr New York Senate representing Utica, New York in the New York State Assembly and then the New York Senate.

== Life ==
He was the son of John Dorrance MD (1778–1857) and Mary (Thompson) Dorrance.

He was a member of the New York State Assembly (Oneida Co.) in 1846.

He was a member of the New York State Senate (19th D.) in 1854 and 1855. He was succeeded by Eaton J. Richardson.

He was buried at the Oneida Castle Cemetery in Oneida.

== Sources ==
- The New York Civil List compiled by Franklin Benjamin Hough (pg. 137, 140, 232 and 271; Weed, Parsons and Co., 1858)

New York State Senate
Preceded by Benjamin N. Huntington	New York State Senate; 19th District; 1854–1855	Succeeded by Eaton J. Richardson
