= John J. Foote =

American politician

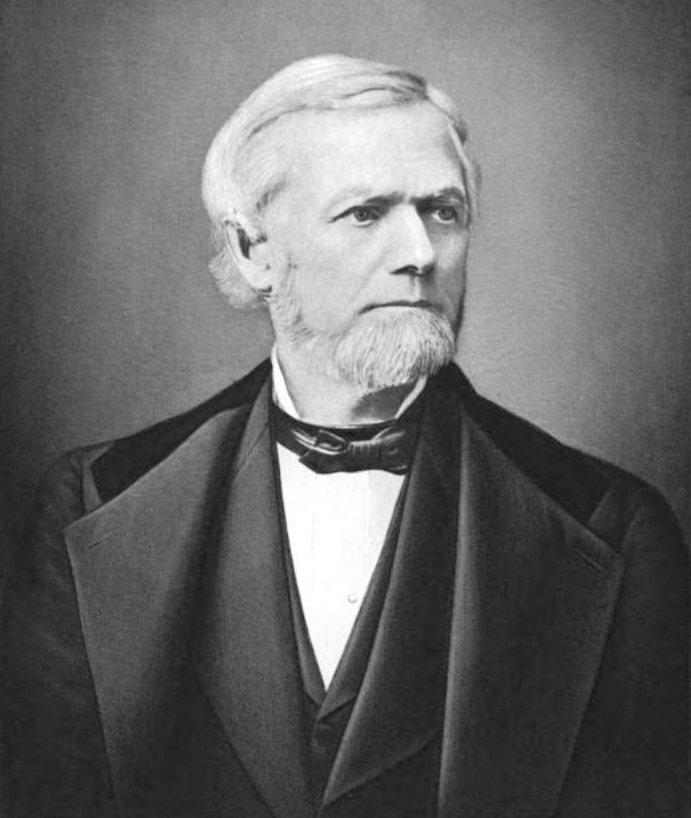

Member of the New York State Senate
- In office 1858–1859
- Constituency: 23rd District

Personal details
- Born: February 11, 1816 Hamilton, New York
- Died: April 15, 1905 (aged 89) Belvidere, Illinois
- Party: Whig; Anti-Nebraska; Republican
- Spouse: Mary Crocker (m. 1839)
- Children: 3
- Occupation: Merchant, politician

John Johnson Foote (February 11, 1816 – April 15, 1905) was an American merchant and politician from New York.

== Life ==
John J. Foote was born in Hamilton, New York, the son of John Foote (1786–1884) and Mary B. (Johnson) Foote, and the grandson of state senator Isaac Foote (1746–1842). On September 24, 1839, he married Mary Crocker (1819–1908), and they had three children.

He entered politics as a Whig, was a delegate to the Anti-Nebraska Party state convention in 1854, and joined the Republican Party upon its foundation. He was Supervisor of the Town of Hamilton in 1854 and 1856, and was both times Chairman of the Board of Supervisors of Madison County.

He was a member of the New York State Senate (23rd D.) in 1858 and 1859. In 1865, he sold his business in Hamilton, and removed to a farm in Belvidere, Illinois. From 1873 to 1876, he was Auditor of the New York City Post Office under Postmaster Thomas L. James.

In the 1860 presidential election, he was a presidential elector for Abraham Lincoln and Hannibal Hamlin.

He died at his home in Belvidere on April 15, 1905, and was buried at the Belvidere Cemetery.

== Sources ==
- The New York Civil List compiled by Franklin Benjamin Hough, Stephen C. Hutchins and Edgar Albert Werner (1867; pg. 442)
- Biographical Sketches of the State Officers and Members of the Legislature of the State of New York in 1859 by William D. Murray (pg. 54ff)
- Bio at Illinois Ancestors

New York State Senate
Preceded by George W. Bradford	New York State Senate; 23rd District; 1858–1859	Succeeded by Perrin H. McGraw
