= Orville Robinson =

American politician & lawyer (1801–1882)

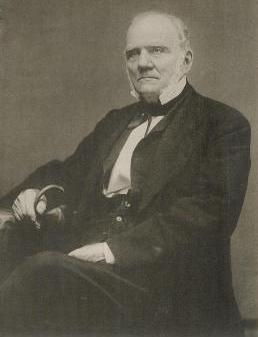

Speaker of the New York State Assembly
- In office January 16, 1856 – December 31, 1856
- Preceded by: DeWitt C. Littlejohn
- Succeeded by: DeWitt C. Littlejohn

Member of the New York State Assembly from the 1st district
- In office 1856; 1834 – 1837
- Preceded by: DeWitt C. Littlejohn
- Succeeded by: DeWitt C. Littlejohn

Member of the U.S. House of Representatives New York's 23rd district
- In office March 4, 1843 – March 3, 1845
- Preceded by: Victory Birdseye
- Succeeded by: DeWitt C. Littlejohn

Personal details
- Born: October 28, 1801 Richfield, New York, U.S.
- Died: December 1, 1882 (aged 81) Oswego, New York, U.S.
- Party: Democratic

Orville Robinson (October 28, 1801 – December 1, 1882) was an American lawyer and politician from New York. From 1843 to 1845, he serves one term in the U.S. House of Representatives.

== Early life and education ==
Robinson was born in Richfield, New York He studied law and was admitted to the bar in 1827.

== Career ==
Robinson began his career as a lawyer in Mexico, New York. He became Justice of the Peace in 1828, Town Clerk in 1829, and surrogate of Oswego County from 1830 to 1838.

=== Political career ===
Robinson served as a member of the New York State Assembly in 1834, 1836 and 1837.

He was district attorney of Oswego County from 1841 to 1843; and Town Supervisor of Mexico in 1843. Robinson was elected as a Democrat to the 28th United States Congress, holding office from March 4, 1843 to March 3, 1845.

He moved to Oswego, New York in 1847, and was city recorder in 1853. He again served as a member of the State Assembly (Oswego Co., 1st D.) in 1856, and was elected Speaker. He was collector of customs for the District of Oswego from 1858 to 1860.

== Personal life ==
Robinson died in Oswego, New York. He was buried at the Riverside Cemetery.

== Sources ==
- United States Congress. "Orville Robinson (id: R000351)". Biographical Directory of the United States Congress.

U.S. House of Representatives
Preceded by Victory Birdseye, A. Lawrence Foster	Member of the U.S. House of Representatives from New York's 23rd congressional district 1843–1845	Succeeded by William J. Hough
New York State Assembly
Preceded by DeWitt C. Littlejohn	New York State Assembly; New York County, 1st District; 1856	Succeeded by DeWitt C. Littlejohn
Political offices
Preceded by DeWitt Clinton Littlejohn	Speaker of the New York State Assembly; 1856	Succeeded by DeWitt C. Littlejohn
