= Senator McGrew =

Senator McGrew may refer to:

- James McGrew (Kansas politician) (1822–1911), Kansas State Senate
- Joseph McGrew (1829–1897), Wisconsin State Senate

== See also ==
- Senator McGraw (disambiguation)
