= Dan S. Wright =

American politician (1802–1867)

Member of the New York State Senate
- In office January 1, 1852 – December 31, 1853
- Preceded by: James M. Cook
- Succeeded by: James C. Hopkins

Member of the New York State Assembly
- In office January 1, 1842 – December 31, 1842

Personal details
- Born: Dan Stiles Wright; March 5, 1802 Shoreham, Vermont, U.S.
- Died: January 31, 1867 (aged 64) Whitehall, New York, U.S.
- Party: Whig
- Spouse(s): Eluthera Farnham Lucy Alvira Wadhams (m. 1830)
- Children: 6
- Occupation: Politician, physician

Dan Stiles Wright (March 5, 1802 Shoreham, Addison County, Vermont – January 31, 1867 Whitehall, Washington County, New York) was an American medical doctor and politician from New York.

== Life ==
He was the son of Ebenezer Wright (1765–1845) and Lucretia (Wood) Wright (c. 1771–1808). He married first Eluthera Farnham. In 1830, he married Lucy Alvira Wadhams (1805–1884), and they had six children.

He was a member of the New York State Assembly (Washington Co.) in 1842.

He was a member of the New York State Senate (13th D.) in 1852 and 1853.

He was one of the founders, and for six terms Master, of the Phoenix Masonic Lodge, No. 96, in Whitehall. At some time he was Senior Grand Warden of the Grand Lodge of New York.

== Sources ==
- The New York Civil List compiled by Franklin Benjamin Hough (pages 137, 147, 227 and 318; Weed, Parsons and Co., 1858)
- Wadhams/Wright genealogy, at Family Tree Maker
- Hyde Genealogy by Reuben H. Walworth (1863; pg. 318)
- Wadhams Genealogy by Harriet Weeks (Wadhams) Stevens (1913; pg. 265)
- History of Masonic Lodges in New York

New York State Senate
Preceded by James M. Cook	New York State Senate; 13th District; 1852 – 1853	Succeeded by James C. Hopkins
