= Thomas J. Barr =

American politician (1812–1881)

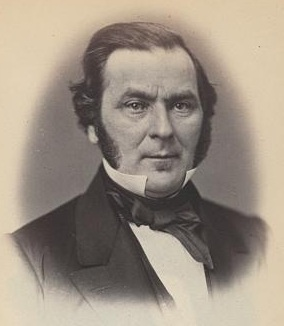

Member of the U.S. House of Representatives from New York's 4th district
- In office January 17, 1859 – March 3, 1861
- Preceded by: John Kelly
- Succeeded by: James Kerrigan

New York State Senate 3rd district
- In office 1854–1855

Personal details
- Born: Thomas Jefferson Barr; 1812 New York City, New York, United States
- Died: March 27, 1881 (aged 68–69) New York City, New York
- Resting place: Calvary Cemetery, Woodside, New York
- Party: Independent Democrat
- Profession: politician; police commissioner

Thomas Jefferson Barr (1812 – March 27, 1881) was an American politician and a U.S. Representative from New York, serving one term from 1859 to 1861.

== Biography ==
Born in New York City, New York in 1812, Barr attended the public schools.

== Career ==
Barr moved to Scotch Plains, New Jersey in 1835, and conducted a roadhouse. He returned to New York City in 1842 and was Assistant Alderman from the Sixth Ward in 1849 and 1850, and Alderman in 1852 and 1853. He was a member of the New York State Senate for the third district in 1854 and 1855.

=== Congress ===
Elected on January 6, 1859, as an Independent Democrat to the 35th United States Congress to fill the vacancy caused by the resignation of John Kelly, and was re-elected to the 36th United States Congress, Barr was U.S. Representative for the fourth district of New York and held office from January 17, 1859, to March 3, 1861.

=== Later career ===
Appointed a New York City Police Commissioner in 1870, Barr served until 1873, when the police board was abolished. Subsequently, he was employed in the office of the Collector of the Port of New York.

== Death ==
Barr died in New York, New York County, New York, on March 27, 1881 (age about 68 years). He is interred at Calvary Cemetery, Woodside, New York.

New York State Senate
Preceded by William McMurray	New York State Senate; 3rd District; 1854–1855	Succeeded by Daniel E. Sickles
U.S. House of Representatives
Preceded by John Kelly	Member of the U.S. House of Representatives from New York's 4th congressional district January 17, 1859 – March 3, 1861	Succeeded by James Kerrigan
