= James Munroe (New York politician) =

American politician

James Munroe (November 24, 1815 – June 7, 1869) was an American politician from New York.

== Life ==
He was the son of Nathan Munro (1791–1839) and Cynthia (Champlin) Munro (1796–1877). He was born in that part of the Town of Camillus which was separated in 1829 as the Town of Elbridge, in Onondaga County, New York. He married Caroline A. Clark, and they had two children.

He was a member of the New York State Senate (22nd D.) from 1852 to 1855, sitting in the 75th, 76th, 77th and 78th New York State Legislatures.

He died in Elbridge, and was buried at the Oakwood Cemetery in Syracuse.

State Senator Allen Munroe (1819–1884) was his brother; Assemblyman Squire Manro (1757–1835) was his grandfather.

== Sources ==
- The New York Civil List compiled by Franklin Benjamin Hough, Stephen C. Hutchins and Edgar Albert Werner (1867; pg. 440f)
- Biographical Sketches of the State Officers and Members of the Legislature of the State of New York by William D. Murphy (1861; pg. 89ff)

New York State Senate
| Preceded by George Geddes | New York State Senate; 22nd District; 1852–1855 | Succeeded by James Noxon |
