= Clarkson F. Crosby =

American politician (1817–1858)

Hon. Clarkson F. Crosby

Member of the New York State Senate from the 11th District
- In office January 1, 1854 – December 31, 1855
- Preceded by: Azor Taber
- Succeeded by: John W. Harcourt

Member of the New York State Assembly from Albany County
- In office January 1, 1845 – December 31, 1845
- Preceded by: Levi Shaw; Samuel Stevens; Simon Veeder
- Succeeded by: Ira Harris; Thomas L. Shafer; Robert D. Watson

Personal details
- Born: Clarkson Floyd Crosby; November 3, 1817
- Died: February 22, 1858 (aged 40) New York City
- Resting place: Green-Wood Cemetery
- Party: Whig
- Spouse: Angelica Schuyler (m. 1838)
- Children: John Schuyler Crosby; Harriet Clarkson Crosby; Eliza Maria Crosby
- Parent(s): William Bedlow Crosby; Harriet Ashton Clarkson
- Education: Union College

Clarkson Floyd Crosby (November 3, 1817 – February 22, 1858) was an American politician from New York.

== Early life ==
Crosby was born on November 3, 1817. He was one of twelve children born to William Bedlow Crosby (1786–1865) and Harriet Ashton (née Clarkson) Crosby (1786–1859). His parents built one of Manhattan's largest houses, modeled after a Regency house in London, that occupied two blocks on Monroe Street (now known as Rutgers Place).

His paternal grandparents were Dr. Ebenezer Crosby and Catharine (née Bedlow) Crosby, who both died when his father was young; thereafter his father and his brother John Player Crosby were adopted by their bachelor uncle, Col. Rutgers, whose estate was worth a million dollars in 1830. His maternal grandparents were Rev. William Clarkson of South Carolina, and Catherine (née Floyd) Clarkson, herself a daughter of Gen. William Floyd, a signer of the Declaration of Independence.

He was a graduate of Union College, located in Schenectady, New York, "but possessing an ample fortune never followed any profession."

== Career ==
Crosby, a man of "vigorous intellect, earnest impulses, and cordial and impressive manners," was a member of the New York State Assembly (Albany Co.) in 1845. He was a presidential elector in 1848, voting for Zachary Taylor and Millard Fillmore.

He was a member of the New York State Senate (11th D.) in 1854 and 1855. While in the Senate, he served on the Select Committee.

== Personal life ==
On September 8, 1838, he married Angelica Schuyler (1820–1896), daughter of John Schuyler and Maria (née Miller) Schuyler. They lived in Watervliet, New York, and had three children, including:

- John Schuyler Crosby (1839–1914), who married Harriet Van Rensselaer, youngest daughter of Gen. Stephen Van Rensselaer IV, and became the Governor of Montana Territory.
- Harriet Clarkson Crosby (1843–1895), who married William Augustus Thompson (1834–1903) in 1863.
- Eliza Maria Crosby (1857–1884), who married William M. Alexander (1845–1872) and Thaddeus Alexander Snively (1851–1913)

After an illness of several months, Crosby died on February 22, 1858, in New York City. He was buried at the Green-Wood Cemetery in Brooklyn.

=== Descendants ===
Through his daughter Harriette, he was the grandfather of Clarkson Crosby Thompson, who married Elizabeth Winters; William Leland Thompson, who married Martha Groome; and Angelica Schuyler Thompson, who married Elbert Scranton.

Through his eldest son John, he was the grandfather of Stephen Van Rensselaer Crosby (1868–1959), who married Henrietta Marion Grew (sister-in-law of J. P. Morgan Jr.); and Angelica Schuyler Crosby (1872–1907), who married the diplomat John B. Henderson Jr., son of U.S. Senator John B. Henderson and Mary Foote Henderson.

New York State Senate
Preceded by Azor Taber	New York State Senate; 11th District; 1854–1855	Succeeded by John W. Harcourt
New York State Assembly
Preceded by Levi Shaw; Samuel Stevens; Simon Veeder	New York State Assembly; Albany County serving with Ira Harris; Leonard Litchfield; 1845–1845	Succeeded by Ira Harris; Thomas L. Shafer; Robert D. Watson
