= Simon C. Hitchcock =

American politician

Simon C. Hitchcock (c. 1801 – September 27, 1878 in Binghamton, Broome County, New York) was an American book publisher and politician from New York.

== Life ==
He married Euphrasia Jackson (1804–1897).

He was a member of the New York State Assembly (Madison Co.) in 1842.

He was a member of the New York State Senate (20th D.) in 1854 and 1855. Afterwards he removed to Binghamton.

In 1862, he was appointed as Collector of Internal Revenue for the 26th District of New York.

He and his wife were buried at the Evergreen Cemetery in Cazenovia.

Author Charles Dudley Warner was his nephew.

== Sources ==
- The New York Civil List compiled by Franklin Benjamin Hough (pg. 137, 142, 226 and 281; Weed, Parsons and Co., 1858)
- The National Almanac (1863; pg. 129)
- Cazenovia publishers at RootsWeb
- OUR SPECIAL WASHINGTON DISPATCHES;...TAX APPOINTMENTS FOR NEW-YORK... in NYT on September 1, 1862

New York State Senate
Preceded by James Platt	New York State Senate; 20th District; 1854–1855	Succeeded by M. Lindley Lee
