= George Richards (New York politician) =

American politician

George Richards (died September 5, 1894) was an American lawyer and politician from New York in the 19th century.

== Biography ==
Richards lived in Warrensburgh, New York.

Richards was District Attorney of Warren County from 1847 to 1850, a member of the New York State Assembly (Warren Co.) in 1852 and a member of the New York State Senate (14th D.) in 1854 and 1855.

He later moved to Potsdam, New York where he worked in the lumber industry. In 1880, he moved to Rouses Point, New York where he worked in the customs house and continued practicing law. When his health declined, he moved in with his son in New York City, where he died in 1894.

== Sources ==
- The New York Civil List compiled by Franklin Benjamin Hough (pages 137, 144, 244, 299 and 384; Weed, Parsons and Co., 1858)

New York State Assembly
Preceded by David Noble 2d	New York State Assembly; Warren County; 1852	Succeeded by Richard P. Smith
New York State Senate
Preceded by Eli W. Rogers	New York State Senate; 14th District; 1854–1855	Succeeded by William Hotchkiss
