= Thomas R. Whitney =

American journalist

Thomas Richard Whitney (May 2, 1807 – April 12, 1858) was a nineteenth-century politician and writer from New York.

== Biography ==
Born in New York City, New York, Whitney was the son of a silversmith. He pursued classical studies and worked as a jeweler, engraver and watchmaker before turning to journalism and politics as editor of the New York Sunday Times. He later published his own paper, the Sunday Morning News, and a magazine, The Republic.

He was a member of the Silver Gray (pro-Millard Fillmore and anti-William H. Seward) faction of the Whig Party, and served as Clerk of the city's Board of Assistant Aldermen. He ran unsuccessfully for the New York State Assembly in 1852. He served as a Whig member of the New York State Senate (4th D.) in 1854 and 1855.

He later became a member of the American Party, also called the Know Nothing Party, and authored 1856's popular A Defence of the American Policy, a book which provided an explanation of the Know Nothing platform and policy objectives. As a Know Nothing, in 1854 Whitney was elected to the 34th United States Congress, and he served from March 4, 1855, to March 3, 1857. During the extended balloting for Speaker of the House in December 1855, Whitney consistently received one vote, that of Henry Mills Fuller.

Whitney became ill during his term in Congress, and traveled to South America in an effort to regain his health. He died in New York City on April 12, 1858, about three weeks after returning home. He was interred in Green-Wood Cemetery in Brooklyn, New York.

== Works ==
- The Young Draftsman's Companion (1830)
- Evening Hours (Poetry anthology) (1844)
- The Ambuscade, a poem (New York, 1845)
- A Defence of the American Policy as opposed to the Encroachments of Foreign Influence, and especially to the Interference of the Papacy (1856)

== Notes ==
New York State Senate
Preceded by Obadiah Newcomb	New York State Senate; 4th District; 1854–1855	Succeeded by Joseph H. Petty
U.S. House of Representatives
Preceded by William M. Tweed	Member of the U.S. House of Representatives from New York's 5th congressional district 1855–1857	Succeeded by William B. Maclay
