= John Vanderbilt =

American politician (1819–1877)

Member of the New York State Senate from the 2nd district
- In office January 1, 1852 – December 31, 1853
- Preceded by: John A. Cross
- Succeeded by: James H. Hutchins

Personal details
- Born: January 28, 1819
- Died: May 16, 1877 (aged 58)
- Party: Democratic
- Spouse: Gertrude Lott Lefferts (m. 1846)
- Parent(s): John Vanderbilt; Sarah Lott
- Profession: Politician, lawyer

John Vanderbilt (January 28, 1819 – May 16, 1877) was an American lawyer and politician from New York.

== Life ==
He was the son of John Vanderbilt (1794–1842) and Sarah Lott (1795–1859). He was baptised on February 21 at the Flatbush Reformed Dutch Church.

He was First Judge of the Kings County Court from 1844 to 1847. On July 8, 1846, he married Gertrude Lott Lefferts (1824–1902), daughter of Congressman John Lefferts.

He was a member of the New York State Senate (2nd D.) in 1852 and 1853.

At the New York state election, 1856, he ran on the Democratic ticket for Lieutenant Governor of New York, but was defeated by Republican Henry R. Selden.

In 1881, his widow published The Social History of Flatbush.

== Sources ==
- The New York Civil List compiled by Franklin Benjamin Hough (pages 137, 146 and 361; Weed, Parsons and Co., 1858)
- Flatbush - The Heart of Brooklyn by Nedda C. Allbray (2004; pg. 109)
- The Social History of Flatbush by Gertrude Lefferts Vanderbilt (first published 1881; re-printed 2003, Heritage Books; pg. 233ff)
- Church records transcribed at Olive Tree Genealogy

New York State Senate
Preceded by John A. Cross	New York State Senate; 2nd District; 1852 – 1853	Succeeded by James H. Hutchins
