= Andrew B. Dickinson =

American politician

Andrew Bray Dickinson (August 29, 1801 – April 21, 1873) was an American politician from New York.

== Biography ==
Dickinson was born on August 29, 1801, in Mendham, Morris County, New Jersey, the son of Gamalial Dickerson (1776–1851) and Elizabeth (Jennings) Dickerson (1800–1858). The family removed to Covert, New York when Andrew was still a young boy. In 1820, he married Hannah Hopkins (1803–1849), and they had seven children. The young couple removed to a farm in the Town of Painted Post, in Steuben County, located in the area which was separated in 1826 as the Town of Hornby. Dickinson was elected the first Supervisor of the town.

He was a Jacksonian member of the New York State Assembly (Steuben Co.) in 1830.

He was a Whig member of the New York State Senate (6th D.) from 1840 to 1843, sitting in the 63rd, 64th, 65th and 66th New York State Legislatures.

He was again a member of the State Senate (26th D.) in 1854 and 1855. He was a delegate to the 1856 Republican National Convention. On June 18, 1857, he married Mary Abigail (Roloson) Ganung (1832–1904), and they had two children.

On March 28, 1861, he was appointed as U.S. Minister to Nicaragua, and took up his post on July 11. On October 21, 1862, he received a recess appointment as U.S. Marshal for the Northern District of New York, and on January 15, 1863, Thomas H. Clay presented his credentials as U.S. Minister to Nicaragua. Dickinson's appointment as U.S. Marshal was confirmed by the U.S. Senate on March 18, 1863, but Edward Dodd was appointed to succeed as U.S. Marshal on April 18, 1863, and Dickinson was on the same day re-appointed as U.S. Minister to Nicaragua. He took up his post again on May 31, 1863, and remained there until July 29, 1869. In 1867, he negotiated a Treaty with Nicaragua (on-line copy; 13 pages), at a time when the Nicaragua Canal was still being seriously considered to be built. He acquired a sugar cane plantation in Nicaragua and remained in the country after the end of his diplomatic mission.

He died on April 21, 1873, in León, Nicaragua, from complications after a fall from a mule, and was buried at the Woodlawn Cemetery (Elmira, New York).

== Sources ==
- The New York Civil List compiled by Franklin Benjamin Hough (pages 132ff, 137, 140, 210 and 270; Weed, Parsons and Co., 1858)
- List of U.S. Marshals for New York
- The Statutes at Large, Treaties, and Proclamations, of the United States (Boston, 1869; Vol XV, pg. 549–562; "Treaty with Nicaragua")
- Dickerson/Dickinson genealogy at RootsWeb
- Andrew Bray Dickinson Bio at RootsWeb

New York State Senate
Preceded by George Huntington	New York State Senate; Sixth District (Class 1); 1840–1843	Succeeded by Clark Burnham
Preceded by Francis R. E. Cornell	New York State Senate; 26th District; 1854–1855	Succeeded by John K. Hale
Diplomatic posts
Preceded by Alexander Dmitry	U.S. Minister to Nicaragua; 1861–1863	Succeeded by Thomas H. Clay
Preceded by Thomas H. Clay	U.S. Minister to Nicaragua; 1863–1869	Succeeded by Charles N. Riotte
