= DeWitt Clinton Littlejohn =

American politician (1818–1892)

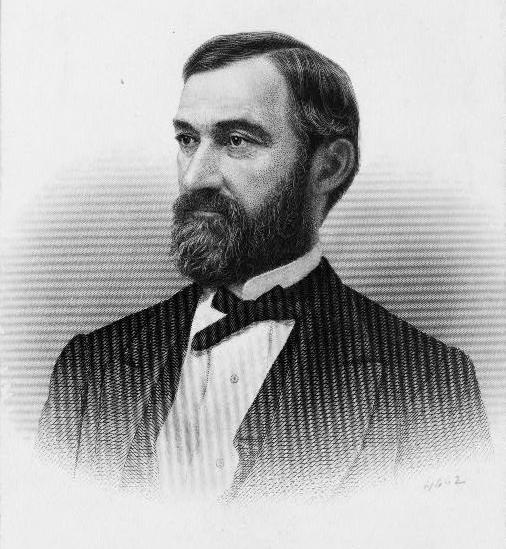
- A late 19th century illustration of Littlejohn
- Born: February 7, 1818; Bridgewater, New York, U.S.
- Died: October 27, 1892 (aged 74); Oswego, New York, U.S.
- Burial place: Riverside Cemetery, (Oswego, New York)
- Military career
- Allegiance: United States; Union
- Branch: United States Army; Union Army
- Rank: Colonel brevet brigadier general
- Conflicts: American Civil War

DeWitt Clinton Littlejohn (February 7, 1818 – October 27, 1892) was a brevet brigadier general in the Union Army and a United States representative from New York during the Civil War.

== Early life and education ==
Littlejohn initially pursued an academic course at Geneva College.

== Career ==
He did not complete college, and instead engaged in several profitable mercantile pursuits, acting for a time as a forwarder of fresh produce on the lakes and canals of the region. He later engaged in the manufacturing of flour in Oswego, New York.

=== New York state political involvement ===
He was Mayor of Oswego, New York in 1849 and 1850. He was a member of the New York State Assembly (Oswego Co., 1st D.) in 1853, 1854, 1855, 1857, 1859, 1860, 1861, 1866, 1867, 1870, 1871, and 1884. He was speaker in 1855, 1857, 1859, 1860 and 1861; and was the chief lieutenant to Thurlow Weed.

In 1861, Littlejohn was influential in the backroom politics to select Ira Harris over Horace Greeley as the Republican Party's nominee to run for the U.S. Senate to succeed William H. Seward, who had not run for re-election, expecting to join President Abraham Lincoln's cabinet. In September, Littlejohn unsuccessfully sued Greeley and the New-York Tribune for libel.

=== Union Army support ===
When the Civil War began in 1861, Littlejohn worked actively to recruit troops in the Oswego area. Littlejohn used his political connections in July 1862 to secure a commission as Colonel of the 110th New York Infantry Regiment, a regiment he helped raise through his personal efforts. He trained his troops at Camp Patterson near Baltimore, where it was stationed until November, when it was ordered to be relocated to federal-occupied New Orleans.

=== U.S. Congress ===
Returning to politics, he successfully campaigned for the U.S. House of Representatives. He was elected as a Republican to the 38th United States Congress. He resigned from the Union Army on February 3, 1863, and served in Congress from March 4, 1863, to March 3, 1865. During that term, he was Chairman of the Committee on Revolutionary Pensions. Littlejohn was not a candidate for renomination in 1864.

On February 26, 1867, President Andrew Johnson nominated Littlejohn for appointment to the grade of brevet brigadier general of volunteers, to rank from March 13, 1865, and the U.S. Senate confirmed the appointment on March 2, 1867.

In 1870, the Republican state convention nominated Littlejohn for Lieutenant Governor of New York on the ticket with Stewart L. Woodford, but he declined to run.

In 1872, fed up with what he perceived to be the corruption of the Grant administration, Littlejohn joined the Liberal Republican Party and supported the candidacy of Horace Greeley for president in 1872, after resolving his previous legal issues with Greeley. He then became a Democrat, and was a delegate to several Democratic state conventions and was a political ally of New York governor and 1876 presidential candidate Samuel J. Tilden.

=== New York and Oswego Midland Railroad ===
He then moved to Buffalo, New York, but returned to Oswego in 1867. Littlejohn wanted to afford Oswego the growth possible by a rail connection to a major port.

In 1868, he organized and served as president of the New York and Oswego Midland Railroad (NY&OM), a route traversing much of New York state on its way to New York City. He also established a steamboat service connecting Long Island to his new railroad.

== Death ==
He died in Oswego, New York, and was interred at Riverside Cemetery in Oswego.

== See also ==
- List of American Civil War brevet generals (Union)

== Notes ==
New York State Assembly
Preceded by Edwin C. Hart	New York State Assembly; Oswego County, 1st District; 1853-1855	Succeeded by Orville Robinson
Preceded by Orville Robinson	New York State Assembly; Oswego County, 1st District; 1857	Succeeded by William Baldwin
Preceded by William Baldwin	New York State Assembly; Oswego County, 1st District; 1859-1861	Succeeded by Elias Root
Preceded by Elias Root	New York State Assembly; Oswego County, 1st District; 1866-1867	Succeeded by John A. Place
Preceded by Benjamin Doolittle	New York State Assembly; Oswego County, 1st District; 1870-1871	Succeeded by Daniel G. Fort
Preceded by William A. Poucher	New York State Assembly; Oswego County, 1st District; 1884	Succeeded by Henry C. Howe
Political offices
Preceded by Robert H. Pruyn	Speaker of the New York State Assembly; 1855	Succeeded by Orville Robinson
Preceded by Orville Robinson	Speaker of the New York State Assembly; 1857	Succeeded by Thomas G. Alvord
Preceded by Thomas G. Alvord	Speaker of the New York State Assembly; 1859–1861	Succeeded by Henry Jarvis Raymond

U.S. House of Representatives
Preceded by William E. Lansing	Member of the U.S. House of Representatives from New York's 22nd congressional district 1863-1865	Succeeded by Sidney T. Holmes
