= Micajah W. Kirby =

American politician

Micajah W. Kirby (September 20, 1798, in Easton, Washington County, New York – March 28, 1882, in Rochester, Monroe County, New York) was an American politician from New York.

== Life ==
He was the son of Elihu Kirby (1761–1811) and Patience (Gifford) Kirby (1762–1825).

He was a member of the New York State Assembly (Monroe Co.) in 1836. He lived in Henrietta, New York.

On November 11, 1841, he married Lucretia Whitaker (c. 1814–1852), and they had three children.

He was a member of the New York State Senate (27th D.) in 1852 and 1853.

== Sources ==
- The New York Civil List compiled by Franklin Benjamin Hough (pages 137, 142, 218 and 286; Weed, Parsons and Co., 1858)
- Kirby genealogy at RootsWeb
- Tombstone transcriptions from Calkins Cemetery in Henrietta

New York State Senate
| Preceded by Samuel Miller | New York State Senate; 27th District; 1852 – 1853 | Succeeded by William S. Bishop |
