= Nathaniel Jones (politician) =

American politician

Nathaniel Jones (February 17, 1788 Tyringham, Berkshire County, Massachusetts – July 20, 1866 Newburgh, Orange County, New York) was an American banker and politician from New York. He served two terms in the U.S. House from 1837 to 1841.

== Life ==
About 1807, he removed to Warwick, New York, and taught school there for several years. Among his pupils was William H. Seward.

=== Political career ===
He was a member of the New York State Assembly (Orange Co.) in 1827 and 1828. Afterwards he engaged in banking.

He was elected as a Democrat to the 25th and 26th United States Congresses, holding office from March 4, 1837, to March 3, 1841.

=== Later career ===
He was New York State Surveyor General from February 1842 to February 1845, and a Canal Commissioner from February 1845 to November 1, 1847, when he resigned.

He was Superintendent of Schools and Clerk of the Board of Education of Newburgh in 1851. He was a member of the New York State Senate (9th D.) in 1852 and 1853.

=== Death ===
He died on July 20, 1866, in Newburgh, Orange County, New York.

Political offices
Preceded by Orville L. Holley	New York State Surveyor General; 1842–1845	Succeeded by Hugh Halsey
New York State Senate
Preceded by James C. Curtis	New York State Senate; 9th District; 1852–1853	Succeeded by John D. Watkins
U.S. House of Representatives
Preceded by John W. Brown	Member of the U.S. House of Representatives from New York's 6th congressional district 1837–1841	Succeeded by James G. Clinton
