= William S. Bishop =

American politician

William S. Bishop (ca. 1804 - June 6, 1863 Rochester, Monroe County, New York) was an American lawyer and politician from New York.

== Life ==
He was a member of the New York State Assembly (Monroe Co.) in 1839.

He was District Attorney of Monroe County from 1847 to 1850. On February 25, 1851, he married Ann Cornelia Rochester (1808–1893), daughter of Assemblyman Nathaniel Rochester (1752–1831).

He was a member of the New York State Senate (27th D.) in 1854 and 1855.

He died of pneumonia, and was buried at the Mount Hope Cemetery, Rochester. His widow married Seth M. Gates in 1867.

== Sources ==
- The New York Civil List compiled by Franklin Benjamin Hough (pg. 137f, 222, 259 and 376; Weed, Parsons and Co., 1858)
- Rochester genealogy at Monroe County NY genealogy

New York State Senate
Preceded by Micajah W. Kirby	New York State Senate; 27th District; 1854–1855	Succeeded by John E. Paterson
