= Azor Taber =

American politician

Member of the New York State Senate from the 11th District
- In office January 1, 1852 – December 31, 1853
- Preceded by: Stephen H. Johnson
- Succeeded by: Clarkson F. Crosby

Personal details
- Born: May 1, 1798 Knox, New York, U.S.
- Died: June 10, 1858 (aged 60) Rensselaer County, New York, U.S.
- Resting place: Albany Rural Cemetery
- Party: Whig

Azor Taber (May 1, 1798 – June 10, 1858) was an American politician from New York.

== Early life ==
Taber was born on May 1, 1798, in Knox, a town in Albany County, New York. He was the son of Gideon Chapman Taber (1764–1847) and Rebecca (née Willis) Taber (1775–1827).

== Career ==
After receiving a classical education, he entered the office of John Lansing Jr., then Chancellor of New York, and studied law. He was admitted to the bar and began practicing in Albany. In 1833, he formed a partnership with Amos Dean, and, reportedly, he was ranked among the ablest attorneys of the city and gained a large and profitable business, and was known by the nickname "Razor Tabor".

He was a member of the New York State Senate (11th D.) in 1852 and 1853. In 1854, Tabor retired from practice due to ill health and returned to Knox.

== Personal life ==
Tabor was twice married. His first marriage was to Sarah Todd (1801–1834). Together, they were the parents of:

- Paul Todd Taber (1827–1852), who became a doctor and married Elizabeth Wright (1830–1873) in 1851.
- Julia Mervin Taber (1830–1899), who married Robert Coats Martin (1823–1906) in 1854.
- Mary Taber (1831–1855), who died unmarried.
- Susan Edwards Taber (1834–1914), who married a Roman named Borgialli.

After the death of his first wife in 1834, he remarried to her younger sister, Catherine Ann Elizabeth Todd (1804–1840). They were the parents of one child before her death in 1840:

- Sarah Taber (1839–1888)

Tabor died on June 10, 1855, in Rensselaer County, New York.

New York State Senate
Preceded by Stephen H. Johnson	New York State Senate; 11th District; 1852–1853	Succeeded by Clarkson F. Crosby
