= Eaton J. Richardson =

Member of the New York State Senate from the 19th district
- In office 1856–1857
- Preceded by: Daniel G. Dorrance
- Succeeded by: Alrick Hubbell

Personal details
- Born: May 14, 1816 Schuyler, New York, U.S.
- Died: February 17, 1895 (aged 78) Yorkville, New York, U.S.
- Party: Republican
- Spouse: Cesarine "Clarissa" Meigs Sleeper (m. 1863–1869; her death)
- Education: Cazenovia Seminary

Eaton J. Richardson (May 14, 1816 – February 17, 1895) was an American lawyer and state legislator in New York. He represented the 19th District in the New York State Senate in 1856 and 1857. He was nominated by the newly organized Republican Party.

== Life and career ==
Eaton J. Richardson was born on May 14, 1816, in Schuyler, New York. Warren Richardson was his father. He grew up on a farm, and attended Cazenovia Seminary (now Cazenovia College) in Cazenovia Village, New York. He studied with and became a law partner of Thomas Clark in Utica, New York.

In 1850 he gave an Independence Day address titled "Our Republic; Its Rise and Progress, Its Perils and Remedy" that was published. He was preceded by Daniel G. Dorrance and succeeded by Alrick Hubbell in the New York State Senate.

== Personal life ==
In 1863 he married Cesarine "Clarissa" Meigs Sleeper from Floyd, New York.

He died on February 17, 1895 in his home in Yorkville, New York.
