= Senator Babcock =

Senator Babcock may refer to:

- George R. Babcock (1806–1876), New York State Senate
- Robert S. Babcock (1915–1985), Vermont State Senate
