= Henry A. Clark (New York politician) =

American politician

Henry A. Clark (August 3, 1818 in Sidney, Delaware County, New York – December 11, 1906) was an American lawyer and politician from New York.

== Life ==
He graduated from Hamilton College in 1838. Then he studied law in Buffalo, was admitted to the bar in 1841, and practiced in Bainbridge, Chenango County.

He was a member of the New York State Senate (23rd D.) in 1862 and 1863.

On February 15, 1865, he married Ellen A. Curtiss, and they had three children.

He was buried at Saint Peter's Cemetery in Bainbridge.

== Sources ==
- The New York Civil List compiled by Franklin Benjamin Hough, Stephen C. Hutchins and Edgar Albert Werner (1870; pg. 443)
- Biographical Sketches of the State Officers and the Members of the Legislature of the State of New York in 1862 and '63 by William D. Murphy (1863; pg. 51ff)

New York State Senate
Preceded by Perrin H. McGraw	New York State Senate; 23rd District; 1862–1863	Succeeded by Frederick Juliand
