= Hugh Halsey =

American politician

- Born: June 26, 1794; New York, United States
- Died: May 29, 1858 (aged 63); Bridgehampton, Suffolk County, New York, United States
- Education: Yale College
- Occupations: Lawyer, politician
- Political party: Democratic Party

Hugh Halsey (June 26, 1794 – May 29, 1858) was an American lawyer and politician from New York.

== Life ==
He was the son of Dr. Stephen Halsey, Jr., and Hamutal (Howell) Halsey (ca. 1762-1848). He graduated from Yale College. Then he studied law with Franklin Viele in Waterford, New York, was admitted to the bar and commenced practice in Madison County, New York.

Halsey was a member of the New York State Assembly (Suffolk Co.) in 1822 and 1824. He was Surrogate of Suffolk County from 1827 to 1840; and First Judge of the County Court from 1833 to 1847. He was a presidential elector in 1844, voting for James K. Polk and George M. Dallas. Halsey was New York State Surveyor General from 1845 until the end of 1847.

He was a member of the New York State Senate (1st D.) in 1854 and 1855, elected on the Hard and Temperance tickets.

Halsey was the father of James M. Halsey, a member of the New York State Assembly.

He died on May 29, 1858, in Bridgehampton, New York.

== Sources ==
- STATE ELECTION; THE LATEST RETURNS in NYT on November 12, 1853
- The New York Civil List compiled by Franklin Benjamin Hough (pages 37f, 278, 365 and 418; Weed, Parsons and Co., 1858)
- DeWitt Clinton and the Rise of the People's Men by Craig Hanyan, Mary L. Hanyan (McGill-Queen's Press, 1996, ISBN 0-7735-1434-1, ISBN 978-0-7735-1434-8 ; page 121)

Political offices
Preceded by Nathaniel Jones	New York State Surveyor General; 1845–1847	Succeeded by Charles B. Stuart as State Engineer and Surveyor
New York State Senate
Preceded by James E. Cooley	New York State Senate; 1st District; 1854–1855	Succeeded by James Rider
