= Henry Shaler Williams =

American paleontologist (1847–1918)

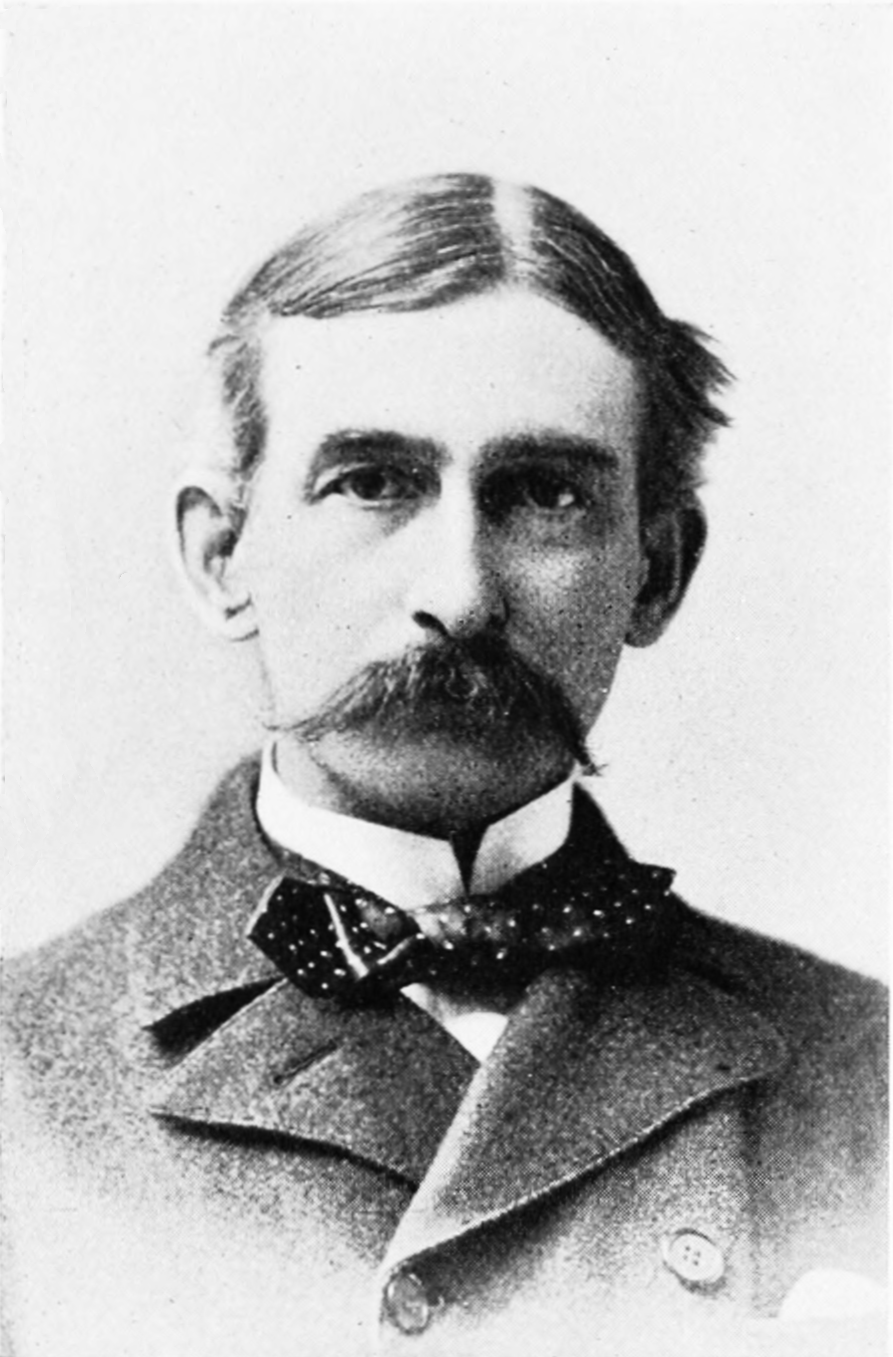
- Born: March 6, 1847; Ithaca, New York, US
- Died: July 31, 1918 (aged 71); Havana, Cuba
- Known for: naming the Mississippian and Pennsylvanian sub-periods
- Parent: Josiah B. Williams (father)

Academic background
- Education: Sheffield Scientific School, 1868; Yale University, Ph.B. 1871
- Thesis: Muscular System of Turtles

Academic work
- Discipline: Zoology
- Sub-discipline: Paleontology
- Institutions: Yale University; Cornell University

Henry Shaler Williams (March 6, 1847 – July 31, 1918) was an American academic and paleontologist. He was a professor at Cornell University and Yale University. Williams is credited with naming the Mississippian and Pennsylvanian sub-periods. He was a founder the Geological Society of America and Sigma Xi honor society.

== Early life ==
Williams was born in Ithaca, New York on March 6, 1847. He was the son of Mary Huggeford Hardy and Josiah B. Williams, a member of the New York State Senate who had numerous businesses in Ithaca, including a bank, cotton mills, iron fabrication, lumber, machinery, and a mercantile. His uncle, Timothy S. Williams, was also a member of the New York State Senate; lumber magnate Henry W. Sage was his first cousin. His mother was a member of the Shaler family who arrived to America on the Mayflower.

Williams attended the Ithaca Academy. He graduated from Yale's Sheffield Scientific School in 1868. He then received a Ph.B. from Yale University in 1871, specializing in zoology. His thesis was on the muscular system of turtles. He worked as an assistant at Yale for two years.

== Career ==
From 1871 to 1872, Williams was a professor of natural science at the University of Kentucky University (now Transylvania University). He worked with his brothers in his father's banking and mercantile businesses in Ithaca from 1872 to 1880. He published his first book, Anatomy of the Domestic Cat, in 1875.

He became an assistant professor of geology at Cornell University in 1879. He was promoted to professor paleontology in 1884 and professor of paleontology and geology in 1886. One of his graduate students at Cornell was Gilbert Dennison Harris.

In 1892, James Dwight Dana selected Williams to be his successor as the Silliman Professor of Geology at Yale University. Williams taught at Yale until 1904, when moved to Cornell University to become a professor of geology and director of the Geological Museum. He retired from Cornell as an emeritus professor in 1912. After retiring from academia, Williams worked on establishing oilfields on his son's property in Cuba from 1916 until he died in 1918.

Williams also conducted research and field work for the United States Geological Survey (USGS). He was the director of the USGS Devonian Laboratory. He was the United States representative to the International Congress of Geology. He was also the associate editor The Journal of Geology and American Journal of Science.

Williams' research focused on the paleontology of Devonian fossils in southern New York, Maine, Ohio, and Pennsylvania. He was able to connect the Devonian rocks in New York with those in Europe. Along the way, he developed a new biofacies methodology that is used for paleontological stratigraphy. He is credited with naming the Mississippian and Pennsylvanian sub-periods, the last periods named on the geologic time scale.

Williams was a founder and leader of Sigma Xi honor society for science and engineering in 1886. He was also a founder of the Geological Society of America on December 27, 1888. He wrote the Sigma Xi constitution, was its first treasurer, its second vice president in 1903, and its first vice president in 1904.

== Personal life ==
Williams was married to Harriet Hart Wilcox on October 17, 1871. Their children were Arthur Shalor Williams, Charlotte Wilcox Williams, Edith Clifford Williams, and Roger Henry Williams.

Williams died in Havana, Cuba of pleurisy on July 31, 1918, at the age of 71 years. He was buried in the Ithaca City Cemetery.

== Selected publications ==
- Anatomy of the Domestic Cat. New York: G. P. Putnam's Son,1875.
- "The Cuboides Zone and Its Fauna; a Discussion of the Methods of Correlation". Bulletin of the Geological Society of America, vol. 1 (May 7, 1890), 481–500.
- "Correlation Papers – Devonian and Carboniferous" Bulletin of the United States Geological Survey, no. 80 (1891).
- "Dual Nomenclature in Geological Classification". The Journal of Geology, vol. 2, no. 2 (1894), 145–160.
- A Geological Biology: An Introduction to the Geological History of Organisms. New York: Henry Holt and Company, 1895.
- "One the Theory of Organic Variation". Science New Series, vol. 6, no. 133 (July 16, 1897), pp. 73–85
- "On the genetic energy of organisms. A paper read before the American Society of Naturalists, December 24, 1897." Science New Series, vol. 7, no. 178 (May 27, 1898), pp. 721–730.
- "Fossil Faunas and Their Use in Correlating Geological Formations". American Journal of Science, vol. 163 (June 1, 1902), pp. 417–432.
- "Shifting of Faunas as a Problem of Stratigraphic Geology". Bulletin of the Geological Society of America, no. 14 (January 1, 1903), pp. 177–190.
- "Contributions to Devonian paleontology, 1903". with Edward M. Kindle. United States Geological Survey Bulletin, no. 244, series C (1903).
- "A new brachiopod, Rensselaeria mainensis, from the Devonian of Maine". Proceedings of the United States National Museum, vol. 32, no. 1527 (April 18, 1907), pp. 267–269.
- "Recurrent Tropidoleptus Zones of the Upper Devonian in New York". United States Geological Survey Professional Papers, vol. 79 and 80 (1913).
- "New brachiopods of the genus Spirifer from the Silurian of Maine". Proceedings of the United States National Museum, vol. 51, no. 2144 (December 16, 1916), pp. 73–80.
