= James C. Hopkins (lawyer) =

American judge and lawyer (1819–1877)

The Honorable James C. Hopkins
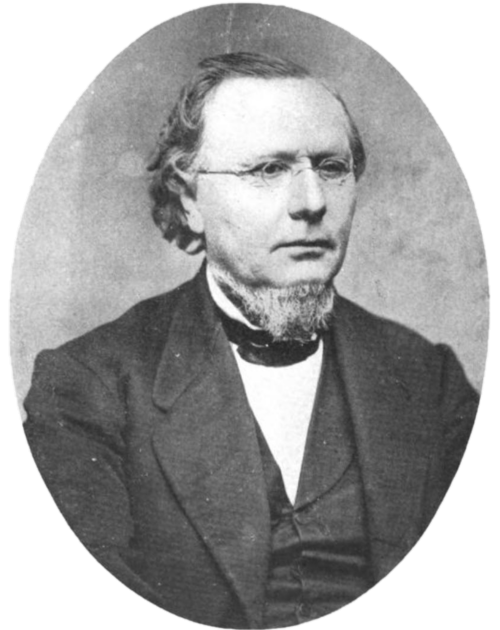

Judge for the United States District Court for the Western District of Wisconsin
- In office July 9, 1870 – September 3, 1877
- Appointed by: Ulysses S. Grant
- Preceded by: Seat established by 16 Stat. 171
- Succeeded by: Romanzo Bunn

Member of the New York Senate from the 13th district
- In office January 1, 1854 – January 1, 1856
- Preceded by: Dan S. Wright
- Succeeded by: Justin A. Smith

Personal details
- Born: James Campbell Hopkins; April 27, 1819 Pawlet, Vermont, U.S.
- Died: September 3, 1877 (aged 58) Madison, Wisconsin, U.S.
- Resting place: Forest Hill Cemetery; Madison, Wisconsin
- Spouses: Mary W. Allen (m. 1845; died 1856); Cornelia Bradley (m. 1857–1877)
- Children: with Mary; 1 son, 1 daughter; with Cornelia; 2 sons, 4 daughters
- Relatives: Deering Davis (grandson)
- Education: read law
- Profession: lawyer, judge

James Campbell Hopkins (April 27, 1819 – September 3, 1877) was an American lawyer and politician from New York. He was the first United States district judge for the Western District of Wisconsin; appointed by President Ulysses S. Grant in 1870, he served until his death in 1877.

== Life ==
Born in Pawlet, Vermont, Hopkins read law and was admitted to the bar in 1845. He was in private practice in Granville, New York, from 1845 to 1853, and was Postmaster of Granville from 1850 to 1855. He was a member of the New York State Senate (13th D.) in 1854 and 1855. He practiced law in Madison, Wisconsin, from 1856 to 1870. Hopkins died in Madison on September 3, 1877 and was buried in Forest Hill Cemetery.

== Federal judicial service ==
On July 9, 1870, Hopkins was nominated by President Ulysses Grant to a new seat on the United States District Court for the Western District of Wisconsin created by 16 Stat. 171. He was confirmed by the United States Senate on July 9, 1870, and received his commission the same day. Hopkins served on the bench until his death.

=== Other service ===
Concurrent with his judicial service, Hopkins was a professor at the University of Wisconsin Law School in Madison from 1876 to 1877.

== Family and legacy ==
James C. Hopkins was the fourth of nine children born to Ervin (or Irvin) Hopkins, a relative of Bishop John Henry Hopkins.

Judge Hopkins married twice. He married Mary W. Allen at Schaghticoke, New York, in 1845. Together they had two children, George B. and Jennie. Mary died in 1856, at Madison. The next year, he married Cornelia Bradley at Beloit, Wisconsin, with whom he had another two sons and four daughters.

Hopkins's daughter Jessie married Nathan Smith Davis Jr., a physician and later dean of Northwestern University's Medical School.

The Wisconsin Historical Society possesses a painting of Judge Hopkins' former home at 134 West Wilson Street in Madison.

== Sources ==
New York State Senate
Preceded by Dan S. Wright	New York State Senate 13th District; 1854–1855	Succeeded by Justin A. Smith
Legal offices
Preceded by Seat established by 16 Stat. 171	Judge of the United States District Court for the Western District of Wisconsin; 1870–1877	Succeeded by Romanzo Bunn
