= John Schuyler Crosby =

American politician (1839–1914)

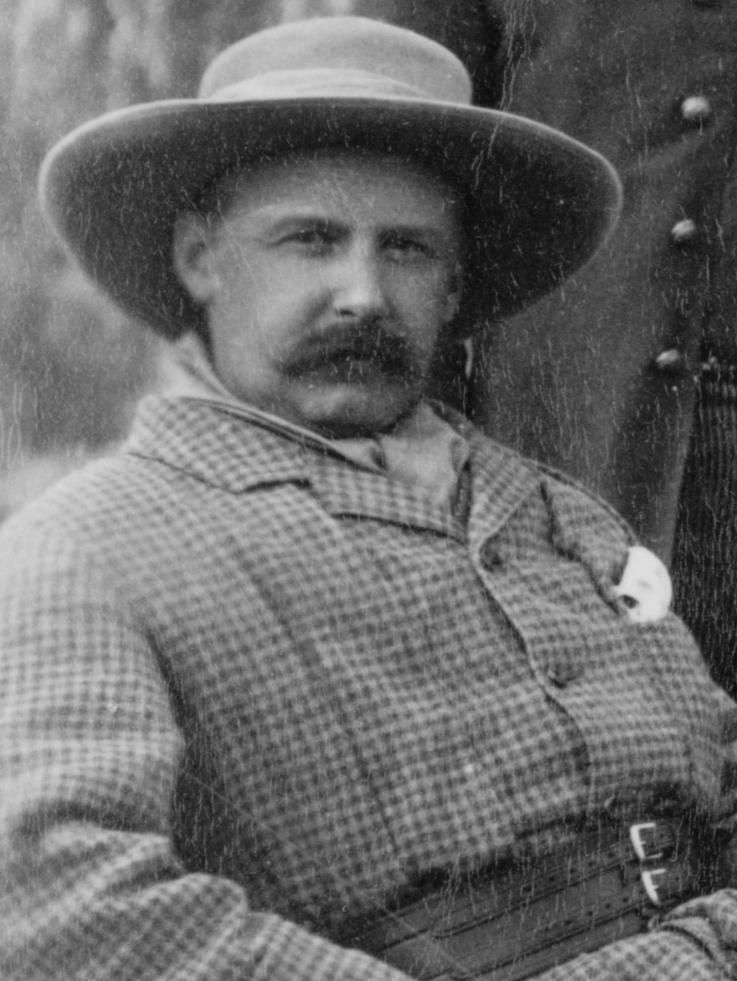
- Crosby in 1883

First Assistant United States Postmaster General
- In office 1884–1885
- Preceded by: Frank Hatton
- Succeeded by: Malcolm Hay

5th Governor of the Montana Territory
- In office January 15, 1883 – November 11, 1884
- Appointed by: Chester A. Arthur
- Preceded by: Benjamin F. Potts
- Succeeded by: B. Platt Carpenter

U.S. Consul, Florence, Italy
- In office 1876–1882
- Preceded by: James Lorimer Graham Jr.
- Succeeded by: William L. Welch

Personal details
- Born: September 19, 1839 Albany, New York
- Died: August 8, 1914 (aged 74) Newport, Rhode Island
- Resting place: Albany Rural Cemetery
- Party: Republican
- Spouse: Harriet Van Rensselaer (m. 1863; died 1911)
- Children: 2
- Parent(s): Clarkson F. Crosby; Angelica Schuyler
- Relatives: Henry Sturgis Crosby (grandson); Stephen Van Rensselaer IV (father-in-law)
- Education: University of the City of New York (now New York University)
- Profession: Civil Engineer
- Awards: Order of the Crown of Italy

John Schuyler Crosby, usually referred to as J. Schuyler Crosby (September 19, 1839 – August 8, 1914) was an American military officer and government official. He was most notable for his service in the Union Army during the American Civil War. After leaving the Army, he served as United States Consul in Florence, Italy and as the fifth Governor of the Montana Territory.

The descendant of several prominent families in New York, Crosby attended the University of the City of New York (now New York University), but left before graduating so he could take an extended world tour. Having served in New York's militia before the Civil War, he was commissioned as a second lieutenant in the Union Army's 1st Artillery Regiment once hostilities commenced. He was later promoted to first lieutenant and brevet captain, and served as assistant adjutant general under General Banks and assistant inspector general under General Philip Sheridan. He remained in the Army after the war, receiving brevets as major and lieutenant colonel for his role in defending the U.S. border during the French occupation of Mexico and participation in Custer's campaigns during the Indian Wars.

After leaving the Army in 1871, Crosby worked as an engineer, designing and supervising the construction of lighthouses, breakwaters, and other marine projects. He served as U.S. Consul in Florence, Italy from 1876 to 1881, Governor of the Montana Territory from 1883 to 1884, U.S. First Assistant Postmaster General from 1886 to 1889, and as New York City school commissioner from 1889 to 1891.

Crosby died in Newport, Rhode Island, on August 8, 1914, and was buried at Albany Rural Cemetery.

== Early life ==
Crosby was born to Clarkson Floyd Crosby (1817–1858) and Angelica Schuyler (1820–1896) in Albany, New York, on September 19, 1839. He was a lineal descendant of Pieter Schuyler and the great-grandson of William Floyd, a signer of the United States Declaration of Independence.

He attended the University of the City of New York (now New York University), but left school before graduation to take a tour of South America, the Pacific Islands, the East Indies, and China.

== Career ==
=== Civil War ===
At the beginning to the American Civil War he joined the Union Army and, having previous experience with the New York State Militia, was commissioned a second lieutenant in the First Artillery. His initial service was with the Army of the Potomac and he earned promotion to first lieutenant in August 1861. In 1862, Crosby was transferred to the Department of the Gulf and following the battles of Fort Bisland, Irish Bend and Vermilion Bayou was brevetted a captain for gallantry.

From 1863 until 1865, he served as assistant adjutant general under General Banks. During the Red River Campaign, Crosby earned a letter of thanks from President Abraham Lincoln for carrying dispatches through enemy territory to Admiral Farragut. Following the capture of Mobile, Alabama, Crosby transferred to become assistant inspector general under General Philip Sheridan.

=== Post-war ===
Following the war, Crosby remained on Sheridan's staff as aide-de-camp and adjutant general. In this capacity, he served along the Rio Grande during the French occupation of Mexico and during Sheridan's and Custer's campaigns during the Indian Wars. He was brevetted four times for gallantry during his military service . Crosby resigned from the army on January 1, 1871, as a brevet lieutenant colonel.

After leaving the military, Crosby went to work as a civil engineer, building breakwaters and lighthouses. He helped found the Westchester Polo Club during this period and also won an international pigeon-shooting contest in 1875. On July 20, 1876, Crosby was with Vice-Commodore William T. Garner of the New York Yacht Club on the vessel Mohawk when a sudden squall overturned the yacht. The U.S. government later presented Crosby with a medal recognizing his heroic efforts to save lives during the boat's sinking.

=== Consul in Italy ===
Crosby was appointed Consul for the United States delegation in Florence, Italy by President Ulysses S. Grant in 1876. While at this posting, he assisted the local government in the capture and prosecution of a group of forgers. For his assistance, on June 29, 1881, Crosby was awarded the Order of the Crown of Italy.

=== Governor of Montana Territory ===
Crosby was nominated to become Governor of Montana Territory by President Chester A. Arthur. He was confirmed by the United States Senate on August 4, 1882, and took office on January 15, 1883.

Upon his arrival, Crosby indicated his commitment to the territory by making over $20,000 of investments within Montana. Despite this level of dedication, the Republican governor still managed to antagonize the territory's Democratic majority through liberal use of his veto power. The most prominent example of his veto use was his blocking of a bill authorizing the establishment of a cattle commission and cattle inspection system. Despite the veto, Crosby did take steps to halt cattle infected with Texas fever from being imported into the territory. Other activities pursued by the governor were a strong anti-crime policy, opposition to polygamy, and an effort to reduce lands held by Native Americans. He also played an important role in blocking cattle interests from gaining control of Yellowstone.

Crosby was an avid big game hunter. While governor, he organized one of the largest big game hunts in U.S. history with a hunting party that included President Arthur, Secretary of War Robert Todd Lincoln, Senator George Graham Vest, Daniel G. Rollins and other dignitaries. Crosby resigned as governor on November 11, 1884, in order to become First Assistant Postmaster General.

=== Later life ===
Crosby held the position of First Assistant Postmaster General until March 1885. He then moved to New York City where, from 1889 to 1891, he was the city's school commissioner. After completing his job as commissioner, Crosby traveled extensively until 1897. He was also active in the Grand Army of the Republic, Loyal Legion, Sons of the Revolution, and a variety of Washington, D.C., and New York City social clubs.

== Personal life ==
On June 26, 1863, Crosby married Harriet Van Rensselaer (1838–1911), youngest daughter of General Stephen Van Rensselaer IV (1789–1868), who was the last patroon of Rensselaerwyck. She was the granddaughter of Stephen Van Rensselaer III and Margarita "Peggy" Schuyler, the daughter of Gen. and U.S. Senator Philip Schuyler. The marriage produced two children:

- Stephen Van Rensselaer Crosby (1868–1959), who married Henrietta Marion Grew (1872–1957), sister-in-law of J. P. Morgan Jr. (1867–1943)
- Angelica Schuyler Crosby (1872–1907), who married John Brooks Henderson Jr. (1870–1923), son of U.S. Senator John B. Henderson (1826–1913) and Mary Foote (1841–1931)

During his final years, Crosby suffered from declining health. On January 20, 1913, while he was in his sick bed, one of his servants suddenly became crazed and he was forced to fight off and subdue the knife wielding valet. Crosby died in Newport, Rhode Island on August 8, 1914. He is buried in Section 14, Lot 1 of Albany Rural Cemetery in Menands, New York.

=== Descendants ===
His grandson was Henry Sturgis Crosby (1898–1929), a bon vivant, poet, and publisher who for some epitomized the Lost Generation in American literature, who was married to Mary Phelps Jacob (1891–1970).

== Sources ==
- Wolff, Geoffrey (2003). Black Sun: The Brief Transit and Violent Eclipse of Harry Crosby. New York Review Books. ISBN 1-59017-066-0.
