= Westchester Polo Club =

First formal American polo club

The Westchester Polo Club was the first formal American polo club. It was established in the spring of 1876. Events were held at the Jerome Park Racetrack in New York. The club was responsible for the International Polo Cup. The club moved to Newport, Rhode Island.

== Members ==
- James Gordon Bennett Jr. (cofounder)
- John Schuyler Crosby (cofounder)
