= George W. Bradford =

American physician and politician

George Washington Bradford (May 9, 1796–October 31, 1883) was an American medical doctor and politician from New York.

== Life ==
George was born on May 9, 1796 in Otsego, Otsego County, New York, to parents Eseck Bradford and Hulda (Skinner) Bradford. He studied medicine in Cooperstown, becoming licensed to practice in 1819. He commenced practice in Homer.

He married Mary Ann Walker, and they had three children.

He was a member of the New York State Assembly (Cortland Co.) during the 75th New York State Legislature in 1852.

He was a member of the New York State Senate (23rd D.) from 1854 to 1857, sitting in the 77th, 78th, 79th and 80th New York State Legislatures. He was the author of the Prohibition law passed by the Legislature in 1854, which was, however, declared unconstitutional by the New York Court of Appeals in 1855.

He died on October 31, 1883 in Syracuse, Onondaga County, New York.

== Sources ==
- The New York Civil List compiled by Franklin Benjamin Hough (pages 137, 139, 242 and 260; Weed, Parsons and Co., 1858)
- Pen and Ink Portraits of the Senators, Assemblymen, and State Officers of New York by G. W. Bungay (1857; pg. 11)
- George Washington Bradford at Ancestry.com

New York State Assembly
Preceded by Alvan Kellogg	New York State Assembly; Cortland County; 1852	Succeeded by Ashbel Patterson
New York State Senate
Preceded by Nathan Bristol	New York State Senate; 23rd District; 1854–1857	Succeeded by John J. Foote
