= Josiah B. Williams =

American politician (1810–1883)

Member of the New York State Senate from the 25th district
- In office 1852–1855
- Preceded by: Henry B. Stanton
- Succeeded by: James Huntington

Personal details
- Born: December 16, 1810 Middletown, Connecticut
- Died: September 26, 1883 (aged 72) Ithaca, New York
- Party: Whig
- Occupation: Businessman, banker, politician

Josiah Butler Williams (December 16, 1810 – September 26, 1883) was an American businessman, banker and senator from New York.

== Life ==
He was the son of Josiah Williams (1768–1842) and Charity (Shaler) Williams (1775–1865). He married Mary Huggeford Hardy (1824–1911), and they had 12 children, among them geologist Henry Shaler Williams (1847–1918).

He was a Whig member of the New York State Senate (25th D.) from 1852 to 1855, sitting in the 75th, 76th, 77th and 78th New York State Legislatures.

Williams was nominated on the Know Nothing ticket for Canal Commissioner at the 1854 New York state election, but two weeks before the election declined to run. The party managers then substituted Hard Democrat Clark Burnham on the ticket but, due to slow communications, Williams still polled almost 60,000 votes.

He was a presidential elector in 1856, voting for John C. Frémont and William L. Dayton.

He was buried at the Ithaca City Cemetery.

State Senator Timothy S. Williams (1800–1849) was his brother; lumber magnate Henry W. Sage (1814–1897) was his nephew.

== Sources ==
- The New York Civil List compiled by Franklin Benjamin Hough (pages 137, 147, 323 and 332; Weed, Parsons and Co., 1858)
- Short bio at Ancestry.com

New York State Senate
Preceded by Henry B. Stanton	New York State Senate; 25th District; 1852–1855	Succeeded by James Huntington
