= Alrick Hubbell =

American politician (1801–1877)

Alrick Hubbell (1801 – 1877) was an American politician from New York.

== Life ==
Hubbell was born on the 4th of October 1801 at Utica, New York. He was the son of Mathew Hubbell (c. 1762–1819), a farmer who in 1789 left Berkshire County, Massachusetts and settled on a farm then in Herkimer County, New York, in the area where now the City of Utica is located.

Alrick Hubbell was Deputy Sheriff of Oneida County (which was the county Utica was in by then) from 1826 to 1828, and at the same time Police Constable of the Village of Utica for a year. In June 1826, he married Laura Eliza Squire (d. 1877). They became the parents of several children. In 1829, he became a merchant. He retired from business in 1855. He was a colonel of the State Militia.

He entered politics as a Whig. He was Chief Engineer of the Utica Fire Department for about ten years, and a Utica alderman from 1840 to 1842.

He was a delegate to the 1856 Republican National Convention, and was Mayor of Utica from 1856 to 1858.

He was a member of the New York State Senate (19th D.) in 1858 and 1859.

He died on January 19, 1877 at Utica, New York.

== Sources ==
- The New York Civil List compiled by Franklin Benjamin Hough, Stephen C. Hutchins and Edgar Albert Werner (1867; pg. 442 and 548)
- Biographical Sketches of the State Officers and Members of the Legislature of the State of New York in 1859 by William D. Murray (pg. 59ff)

Political offices
| Preceded by Henry H. Fish | Mayor of Utica, New York; 1856–1858 | Succeeded by Roscoe Conkling |
New York State Senate
| Preceded by Eaton J. Richardson | New York State Senate; 18th District; 1858–1859 | Succeeded by William H. Ferry |
