= Perrin H. McGraw =

American politician

Perrin Henry McGraw (December 28, 1822 McGrawsville, Cortland County, New York – October 16, 1899) was an American merchant and politician from New York.

== Life ==
He was the son of Assemblyman Harry McGraw (c.1797–1849) and Sally (Smith) McGraw (d. 1874). He became a merchant. On April 26, 1846, he married Louisa Pritchard (1824–1890), and they had several children. He was Postmaster of McGrawsville from 1849 to 1853.

He was a member of the New York State Assembly (Cortland Co.) in 1854; and a member of the New York State Senate (23rd D.) in 1860 and 1861.

He was buried at the McGraw Rural Cemetery.

== Sources ==
- The New York Civil List compiled by Franklin Benjamin Hough, Stephen C. Hutchins and Edgar Albert Werner (1867; pg. 442 and 476)
- Biographical Sketches of the State Officers and Members of the Legislature of the State of New York by William D. Murphy (1861; pg. 80ff)
- Tremayne's Table of the Post-Offices in the United States (1850; pg. 111)

New York State Assembly
Preceded by Ashbel Patterson	New York State Assembly; Cortland County; 1854	Succeeded by John H. Knapp
New York State Senate
Preceded by John J. Foote	New York State Senate; 23rd District; 1860–1861	Succeeded by Henry A. Clark
