= Nathan Bristol =

American politician (1805–1874)

Nathan Bristol (March 7, 1805 Harpersfield, Delaware County, New York – March 1, 1874 Port Jervis, Orange County, New York) was an American merchant and politician from New York.

== Life ==
In April 1833, he married Cornelia Davis.

He was Supervisor of the Town of Harpersfield in 1833 and 1834. He was a member of the New York State Assembly (Delaware Co.) in 1840. Afterwards he removed to Factoryville (now Waverly), in Tioga County, New York, and engaged in the lumber trade.

He was a member of the New York State Senate (23rd D.) in 1852 and 1853.

He died at the home of his son-in-law Dr. Solomon Van Etten (1829–1894) in Port Jervis.

== Sources ==
- Franklin Benjamin Hough, ed. (1858). The New-York Civil List. Weed, Parsons and Co. pp. 137, 139, 223, 261.
- Bio transcribed from Oor County and Its People: A Memorial History of Tioga County by LeRoy W. Kingman (Elmira NY, 1897)
- History of Harpersfield
- Marriage notices transcribed from the Delaware Gazette (1819–1900,) at US Gen Web
- Van Etten genealogy at US Gen Net

New York State Senate
Preceded by Levi Dimmick	New York State Senate; 23rd District; 1852 – 1853	Succeeded by George W. Bradford
