= James H. Hutchins =

American politician

James H. Hutchins was an American politician from New York.

== Life ==
He was a member of the New York State Assembly (Kings Co., 3rd D.) in 1853.

He was a member of the New York State Senate (2nd D.) in 1854 and 1855.

== Sources ==
- The New York Civil List compiled by Franklin Benjamin Hough (pages 137, 142, 245 and 283; Weed, Parsons and Co., 1858)

New York State Assembly
Preceded by Samuel E. Johnson	New York State Assembly; Kings County, 3rd District; 1853	Succeeded by Samuel D. Morris
New York State Senate
Preceded by John Vanderbilt	New York State Senate; 2nd District; 1854–1855	Succeeded by Cyrus P. Smith
