= Russell Smith (New York politician) =

American politician (1822–1866)

Member of the New York House of Representatives from the 16th district
- In office 1852–1853

Personal details
- Born: July 13, 1822
- Died: May 10, 1866 (aged 43) New York City, New York, U.S.
- Resting place: Manhasset, New York, U.S.
- Spouse: Harriette M. Bacon (m. 1844)
- Children: 1
- Education: Yale College (BA, MA); Yale Law School
- Occupation: Politician; lawyer

Russell Smith (July 13, 1822 – May 10, 1866) was an American politician from New York.

== Early life ==
Russell Smith was born on July 13, 1822. He entered Yale College from Norfolk, Virginia, and graduated in 1842 with a Bachelor of Arts and Master of Arts. He studied in the Yale Law School, and was admitted to the bar in September 1843.

== Career ==
In the spring of 1844, Smith began practicing law in New York City. He continued practicing there until 1852, when he moved to Yonkers.

In 1852, Smith was elected to the New York State Legislature to represent district 16.

== Personal life ==
Smith married Harriette M. Bacon of New Haven, Connecticut, on September 10, 1844. He had a daughter. He lived in Yonkers.

Smith died on May 10, 1866, in New York City. He was buried in Manhasset.
