= Henry Bradford Smith =

American philosopher (1882–1938)

Henry Bradford Smith (1882–1938) was an American philosopher, and an influential member of the 'experimental pragmatists' or 'Pennsylvania School'.

== Life and works ==
Smith was born on January 14, 1882, in Philadelphia, Pennsylvania. He was the son of Henry Augustus Smith and Martha Louise Stevenson Smith. Smith completed his undergraduate studies at the University of Pennsylvania, earning a Bachelor of Arts degree in 1903. He continued at the same institution to pursue his PhD in philosophy, which he received in 1909. His doctoral dissertation was titled “Transition from ‘Bewusstsein’ to ‘Selbstbewusstsein’ in Hegel’s ‘Phenomenology of Mind’.”

In 1911, Smith began his academic career as an instructor in philosophy at the University of Pennsylvania. Over time, he rose through the ranks, achieving the position of full professor by 1924. He remained in this role until his death in 1938.
