= Richard U. Sherman =

American politician

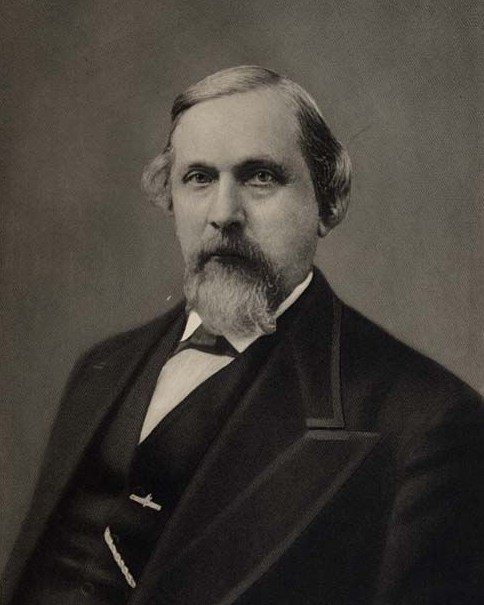
- Portrait of Sherman, c. 1875

Member of the New York State Assembly from the 1st Oneida County district
- In office January 1, 1875 – December 31, 1876
- Preceded by: George W. Chadwick
- Succeeded by: James Corbett
- In office January 1, 1857 – December 31, 1857
- Preceded by: George F. Fowler
- Succeeded by: Henry R. Hart

Clerk of the New York State Assembly
- In office January 7, 1851 – January 6, 1857
- Preceded by: James R. Rose
- Succeeded by: William Richardson

Personal details
- Born: Richard Updike Sherman; June 26, 1819 Vernon, New York, U.S.
- Died: February 21, 1895 (aged 75) New Hartford, New York, U.S.
- Resting place: Forest Hill Cemetery
- Party: Whig (until 1856); Republican (1856–1872); Liberal Republican (1872); Democratic (1872–1895)
- Spouse: Mary Frances Sherman (m. 1848)
- Children: 6, including James

Military service
- Branch/service: New York State Militia
- Years of service: 1841–1857
- Rank: Brigadier general

Richard Updike Sherman (June 26, 1819 – February 21, 1895) was a American politician, newspaper publisher, and editor. He was the father of the 27th Vice President of the United States James S. Sherman.

== Early life and family ==
=== Childhood and education ===
Sherman was born on June 26, 1819, in Vernon, New York. He attended Utica Academy.

=== Marriage and children ===
Sherman married his distant cousin, Mary Frances Sherman, in 1848. They had six children: Richard W., a civil engineer and two-term mayor of Utica, New York; Stalham W. (died 1894), superintendent and treasurer of New Hartford Canning Co.; Mary Louise, married her brother James's law partner, Henry J. Cookinham; James Schoolcraft Sherman (1855–1912), 27th vice president of the United States; Sanford F., owner of S. F. Sherman Men’s Furnishings; Willet H. (died 1868).

== Career ==
=== Journalism ===
From 1844 to 1846, Sherman was editor of the Oswego Daily Times & The Herkimer Journal. In 1847, he owned and edited the Rochester Daily Evening Gazette. From 1847 to 1882, he was co-owner and editor of the Utica Morning Herald.

=== Government and politics ===
Sherman was appointed as Clerk of the New York State Assembly in 1851, when the Whig Party took control of the chamber. Following the collapse of the Whig Party in 1856, he became a member of the nascent Republican Party and served clerk until his election as assemblyman for Oneida County's 1st district in 1857. He was a delegate to the New York State Constitutional Convention of 1867–1868 and was an assistant clerk of the United States House of Representatives in 1870.

During the 1872 U.S. House of Representatives elections, Sherman was jointly nominated by the Liberal Republican Party and Democratic Party for the state's New York's 22nd congressional district but lost to Ellis H. Roberts. Thereafter, he affiliated himself with the Democrats. He was elected to his old seat in the state assembly for the legislature's 1875 and 1876 sessions.

== Later life and death ==
After leaving the state legislature for the second time, Sherman served on the New York State Fish and Game Commission, as a trustee of the New Hartford Cotton Company, and as president of the New Hartford Canning Company. He died in New Hartford on February 21, 1895.

Government offices
Preceded by James R. Rose	Clerk of the New York State Assembly; 1851–1857	Succeeded by William Richardson
New York State Assembly
Preceded by George F. Fowler	New York State Assembly; Oneida County, 1st District; 1857	Succeeded by Henry R. Hart
Preceded by George W. Chadwick	New York State Assembly; Oneida County, 1st District; 1875–1876	Succeeded by James Corbett
