= Benjamin S. W. Clark =

American politician

New York State Prison Inspector
- In office March 2, 1876 – December 31, 1876 Serving with George Wagener; Rodney R. Crowley
- Appointed by: Samuel J. Tilden
- Preceded by: Moss K. Platt
- Succeeded by: Robert H. Anderson

Warden of Sing Sing
- In office 1877–1878
- Preceded by: Charles Davis
- Succeeded by: Charles Davis

1st New York State Superintendent of Public Works
- In office January 30, 1878 – January 15, 1880
- Appointed by: Lucius Robinson
- Succeeded by: Silas Belden Dutcher

Personal details
- Born: May 27, 1829 Franklin County, New York, U.S.
- Died: October 19, 1912 (aged 83) Malone, New York, U.S.
- Spouse: Adaline W. Meigs (m. 1851–1912)
- Parent(s): Samuel Smith Clark (1801–1870); Jane Ann Wead (1806–1872)

Benjamin S. W. Clark (May 27, 1829 – October 19, 1912) was an American merchant and politician from New York. He was the first New York State Superintendent of Public Works.

== Biography ==
He was born in Franklin County, New York, to Samuel Smith Clark (1801–1870) and Jane Ann (Wead) Clark (1806–1872) on May 27, 1829. Samuel Smith Clark was Franklin County Clerk from 1832 to 1834. Samuel's father was Benjamin Clark who was First Judge of the Franklin County Court from 1825 to 1829. In 1851, Benjamin S. W. Clark married Adaline W. Meigs.

He was Cashier of the Farmers National Bank of Malone. He was Franklin County Treasurer from 1858 to 1860, and later Clerk for the Board of Supervisors of Franklin County.

In March 1876, he was appointed by Governor Samuel J. Tilden an Inspector of State Prisons to fill the vacancy caused by the death of Moss K. Platt. He was appointed Warden of Sing Sing in 1877.

He was the first New York State Superintendent of Public Works under the State constitutional amendment of 1876, appointed after a year-long struggle between Governor Lucius Robinson and a hostile New York State Senate which had rejected the appointment of Robinson's first three nominees, George B. McClellan, Charles S. Fairchild and Daniel Magone.

Around 1900 he was a New York State Bank Examiner.

He died on October 19, 1912, in Malone, New York, and was buried at the Morningside Cemetery in Malone.

Political offices
Preceded by Christopher A. Walrath; Darius A. Ogden as Canal Commissioners	Superintendent of Public Works; 1878–1880	Succeeded by Silas Belden Dutcher
