= 1876 New York state election =

1876 New York gubernatorial election
- November 7, 1876
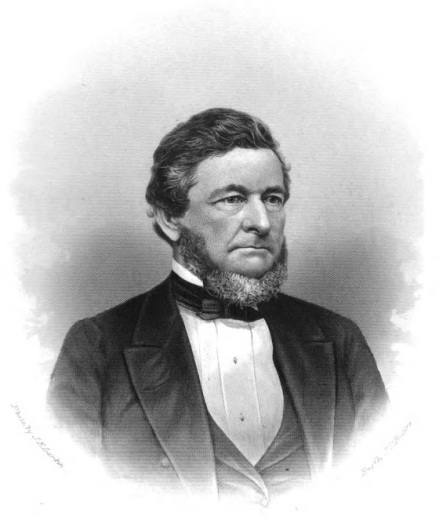

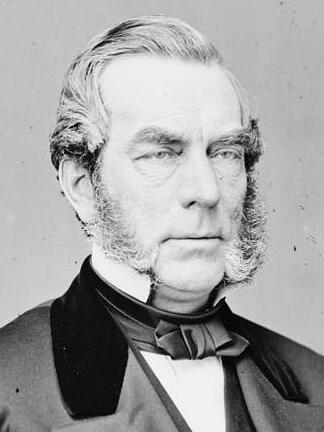
Nominee	Lucius Robinson	Edwin D. Morgan
Party	Democratic	Republican
Popular vote	519,831	489,371
Percentage	51.26%	48.26%
- County results Robinson: 50–60% 60–70% Morgan: 40–50% 50–60% 60–70% No Data
Governor before election
Samuel Tilden
Democratic
Elected Governor
Lucius Robinson
Democratic

The 1876 New York state election was held on November 7, 1876, to elect the governor, the lieutenant governor, a judge of the New York Court of Appeals, a Canal Commissioner and an Inspector of State Prisons, as well as all members of the New York State Assembly and two members of the New York State Senate. Besides, two constitutional amendments were proposed - to abolish the elected Canal Commissioners and appoint a Superintendent of Public Works instead; and to abolish the elected New York State Prison Inspectors and appoint a Superintendent of State Prisons instead - and both were accepted by the electorate.

== History ==
The Republican state convention met on August 23 at the Town Hall in Saratoga Springs, New York. Warner Miller was Temporary Chairman until the choice of John M. Francis as Permanent Chairman. Ex-Governor Edwin D. Morgan (in office 1859–1862) was nominated for Governor on the first ballot (vote: Morgan 242, William M. Evarts 126, William H. Robertson 24, Martin I. Townsend 18). Sherman S. Rogers was nominated for Lieutenant Governor on the first ballot (vote: Rogers 240, Theodore M. Pomeroy 178). George F. Danforth was nominated for Judge of the Court of Appeals on the second ballot (first ballot: Danforth 107, Lyman Tremain 81, Prescott 67, Erastus Cook 49, Edwin Countryman 31, Bullard 14; second ballot: Danforth 185, Tremain 83, Prescott 70). Daniel G. Spencer was nominated for Canal Commissioner after a rising vote (vote: Spencer 113, Benjamin Carpenter 109). Charles W. Trowbridge was nominated for Prison Inspector after the first ballot (vote: Trowbridge 147, John W. Veeder 40, William W. Enos 33, William P. More 31, Charles Tremain 29, William Post 2).

The Liberal Republican state convention met also on August 23 at Saratoga Springs. Benjamin F. Manierre was chairman. The convention endorsed the Republican ticket.

The Democratic state convention met on August 30 at Saratoga Springs. Judge Gray was chairman. Ex-Governor Horatio Seymour (in office 1853-1854 and 1863–1864) was nominated for Governor again. The convention re-assembled on August 31, and re-nominated the incumbent Lieutenant Governor William Dorsheimer by acclamation. Then Lester C. Faulkner read a telegram received from the Committee that informed Seymour of his nomination, stating in a roundabout way that Seymour, who was already in bad health at home in Utica, New York, had accepted the nomination. Robert Earl for Judge of the Court of Appeals, and Darius A. Ogden for Canal Commissioner, were nominated by acclamation. Robert H. Anderson was nominated for Prison Inspector on the first ballot (vote: Anderson 163, Benjamin S. W. Clark 146). After a few more speeches, the convention adjourned sine die in the afternoon. In the evening, it was discovered that Seymour had not accepted the nomination, but on the contrary had sent a telegram to Chairman Gray before the opening of the second day's session declining the nomination. This telegram was held back on the advice of Daniel Magone. It was believed that the Tilden faction had the intention to have the State Committee select a candidate later. Others believed that the hiding of Seymour's refusal from the convention was done with the intention to force him to stay on the ticket, help to get the Democratic ticket elected and then resign, like Martin Van Buren who resigned two months into his term to let his lieutenant Enos T. Throop occupy the office. The convention re-assembled on September 13 at Congress Hall in Saratoga Springs, and nominated State Comptroller Lucius Robinson for Governor, whereupon John Kelly resigned from the ticket on which he had been placed as a presidential elector at-large.

The Greenback convention met on September 26 at Martin's Opera House in Albany, New York. A. A. Carsey was Temporary and Permanent Chairman. Richard M. Griffin for Governor; Thomas Armstrong for Lieutenant Governor; Abraham J. Cuddeback for Canal Commissioner; Marcena M. Dickinson, of Nyack, for Judge of the Court of Appeals; and John W. Crump for Prison Inspector; were nominated by acclamation.

== Result ==
The whole Democratic ticket was elected.

The incumbent Lt. Gov. Dorsheimer was re-elected.

With the ratification of the two amendments, this was the last time Canal Commissioners and Prison Inspectors were elected.

1876 state election results
Office	Democratic ticket		Republican ticket		Prohibition ticket		Greenback ticket	
Governor	Lucius Robinson	519,831	Edwin D. Morgan	489,371	William J. Groo	3,412	Richard M. Griffin	1,436
Lieutenant Governor	William Dorsheimer	518,769	Sherman S. Rogers	490,075	Albert F. Brown	3,346	Thomas Armstrong	1,567
Judge of the Court of Appeals	Robert Earl	513,899	George F. Danforth	487,130	Henry Hagner	2,561	Marcena M. Dickinson	75
Canal Commissioner	Darius A. Ogden	518,807	Daniel G. Spencer	489,953	Shotwell Powell	3,284	Abraham J. Cuddeback	971
Inspector of State Prisons	Robert H. Anderson	518,166	Charles T. Trowbridge	490,138	Elias T. Talbot	3,291	John W. Crump	1,511

== See also ==
- New York gubernatorial elections

== Sources ==
- The tickets: in NYT on November 2, 1876
- The Democratic candidates: SKETCHES OF THE CANDIDATES in NYT on September 1, 1876
- Results: The Tribune Almanac 1877
