= 1874 New York state election =

1874 New York gubernatorial election
- November 3, 1874
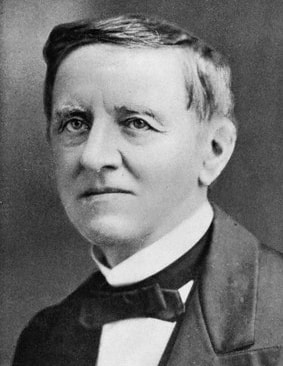

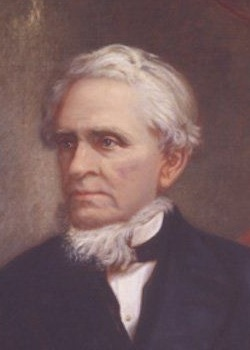
Nominee	Samuel J. Tilden	John Adams Dix
Party	Democratic	Republican
Popular vote	416,374	366,065
Percentage	52.43%	46.09%
- County results Tilden: 40–50% 50–60% 60–70% Dix: 40–50% 50–60% 60–70% No Data
Governor before election
John Adams Dix
Republican
Elected Governor
Samuel Tilden
Democratic

The 1874 New York state election was held on November 3, 1874, to elect the governor, the lieutenant governor, a judge of the New York Court of Appeals, a Canal Commissioner and an Inspector of State Prisons, as well as all members of the New York State Assembly and one member of the New York State Senate.

== History ==
The Prohibition state convention met on June 23 at Auburn, New York. James L. Bagg was temporary chairman until the choice of Charles C. Leigh as president. Myron H. Clark was nominated for governor on the first ballot (vote: Clark 81, Horace V. Howland 27, Charles C. Leigh 9). James L. Bagg for lieutenant governor, Horace V. Howland for Judge of the Court of Appeals, Daniel Walford for Canal Commissioner, and Ira Bell for Prison Inspector, were nominated by acclamation.

The Democratic state convention met on September 16 and 17 at Syracuse, New York. Samuel J. Tilden was nominated for governor on the first ballot (vote: Tilden 252, Amasa J. Parker 126, Lucius Robinson 6, J. McQuade 3, George G. Bradley 1). William Dorsheimer was nominated for lieutenant governor on the first ballot (vote: Dorsheimer 193, Smith M. Weed 135, Stephen T. Hayt 34, Edward F. Jones 15, George W. Schuyler 11). Adin Thayer was nominated for Canal Commissioner on the first ballot (vote: Thayer 196, Isaiah Fuller 148, Nathaniel P. Milliman 5). George Wagener was nominated for Prison Inspector during the first ballot when he had 118 votes and George W. Millspaugh 35. Theodore Miller was nominated for Judge of the Court of Appeals on the first ballot (vote: Miller 196, Robert Earl 115).

The Republican state convention met on September 23 at the Opera House in Utica, New York. Theodore M. Pomeroy was temporary chairman until the choice of Ex-Governor Edwin D. Morgan as president. The incumbents Governor John A. Dix, Lieutenant Governor John C. Robinson, Judge Alexander S. Johnson, Canal Commissioner Alexander Barkley and Prison Inspector Thomas Kirkpatrick were re-nominated by acclamation.

The Liberal Republican state convention met on September 29 at Tweddle Hall in Albany, New York. Charles Hughes was president. The convention did not nominate a ticket.

== Result ==
The whole Democratic ticket was elected, defeating all the incumbents.

The seat in the New York State Senate was won by Democrat Albert P. Laning.

75 Democrats and 53 Republicans were elected for the session of 1875 to the New York State Assembly.

1874 state election results
Office	Democratic ticket		Republican ticket		Prohibition ticket	
Governor	Samuel J. Tilden	416,374	John Adams Dix	366,065	Myron H. Clark	11,768
Lieutenant Governor	William Dorsheimer	416,714	John C. Robinson	365,226	James L. Bagg	11,310
Judge of the Court of Appeals	Theodore Miller	410,172	Alexander S. Johnson	360,760	Horace V. Howland	9,537
Canal Commissioner	Adin Thayer	417,023	Alexander Barkley	365,244	Daniel Walford	11,328
Inspector of State Prisons	George Wagener	415,253	Thomas Kirkpatrick	365,734	Ira Bell	11,344

== See also ==
- New York gubernatorial elections

== Sources ==
- The tickets: THE STATE ELECTION.; CANDIDATES TO BE VOTED FOR TO-DAY in NYT on November 3, 1874
- Result for governor, Senate and Assembly: NEW-YORK ELECTIONS.; RESULTS OF THE OFFICIAL CANVASS FOR THE VARIOUS OFFICERS in NYT on November 19, 1874
- Results: The Tribune Almanac 1875
