= 1875 New York state election =

The 1875 New York state election was held on November 2, 1875, to elect the Secretary of State, the State Comptroller, the Attorney General, the State Treasurer, the State Engineer, a Canal Commissioner and an Inspector of State Prisons, as well as all members of the New York State Assembly and the New York State Senate.

== History ==
The Republican state convention met on September 8 at Saratoga Springs, New York. Frederick W. Seward was nominated for Secretary of State by acclamation. Francis E. Spinner was nominated for Comptroller on the first ballot (vote: Spinner: 259, A. S. Diven 49, Edwin D. Morgan 36, W. W. Palmer 23, E. B. Judson 18, Calvin T. Hulburd 4, Francis C. Barlow 3). Edwin A. Merritt was nominated for Treasurer by acclamation. George F. Danforth was nominated for Attorney General on the first ballot (vote: Danforth 258, L. B. Prince 149). Oliver H. P. Cornell was nominated for State Engineer on the first ballot (vote: Cornell 301, Joseph N. Green 71, Charles H. Fisher 12, George Geddes 1). William T. Tinsley for Canal Commissioner, and Benoni I. Ives for Prison Inspector, were nominated by acclamation.

The Democratic state convention met on September 16 and 17 at Syracuse, New York. John Bigelow, a Republican, was proposed by DeWitt Clinton Littlejohn for Secretary of State, and was nominated by acclamation. Ex-Comptroller Lucius Robinson (in office 1862–1865) was re-nominated by acclamation. Charles S. Fairchild was nominated for Attorney General during the first ballot. Charles N. Ross was nominated for Treasurer on the first ballot. John D. Van Buren, Jr. was nominated for State Engineer by acclamation. Christopher A. Walrath for Canal Commissioner, and Rodney R. Crowley for Prison Inspector, were then nominated amid great noise and confusion.

== Results ==
The whole Democratic ticket was elected.

20 Republicans and 12 Democrats were elected to a two-year term (1876–77) in the New York State Senate.

72 Republicans and 56 Democrats were elected for the session of 1876 to the New York State Assembly.

1875 state election results
Office	Democratic ticket		Republican ticket		Prohibition ticket	
Secretary of State	John Bigelow	390,211	Frederick W. Seward	375,401	George B. Dusinberre	11,103
Comptroller	Lucius Robinson	389,709	Francis E. Spinner	376,150	Alphonso A. Hopkins	10,614
Attorney General	Charles S. Fairchild	390,443	George F. Danforth	367,141	Eli T. Marsh	10,927
Treasurer	Charles N. Ross	391,637	Edwin A. Merritt	373,575	Stephen B. Ayres	11,013
State Engineer	John D. Van Buren, Jr.	391,665	Oliver H. P. Cornell	373,970	George A. Dudley	11,154
Canal Commissioner	Christopher A. Walrath	392,184	William T. Tinsley	373,791	Ira Bell	10,879
Inspector of State Prisons	Rodney R. Crowley	392,495	Benoni I. Ives	373,043	John B. Gibbs	10,491

== See also ==
- New York state elections

== Sources ==
- Result: THE STATE CANVASS in NYT on December 4, 1875
- Result for Comptroller and Secretary of State: The Tribune Almanac for 1876
- Results for Attorney General, Treasurer, State Engineer, Canal Commissioner, and Prison Inspector The Tribune Almanac for 1876
- The candidates: Sketches of the nominees of the Republican State Convention in NYT on September 9, 1875
