= Moss K. Platt =

American politician

Moss Kent Platt

Member of the New York Senate from the 16th district
- In office January 1, 1866 – December 31, 1867
- Preceded by: Palmer E. Havens
- Succeeded by: Matthew Hale

New York State Prison Inspector
- In office January 1, 1874 – March 1, 1876 Serving with Thomas Kirkpatrick (1874); Ezra Graves (1874-75); George Wagener (1875-76); Rodney R. Crowley (1876)
- Preceded by: Solomon Scheu
- Succeeded by: Benjamin S. W. Clark

Personal details
- Born: May 3, 1809 Plattsburgh, New York
- Died: March 1, 1876 (aged 66)
- Spouse: Elizabeth S. Freligh (m. 1830–1856)

Moss Kent Platt (May 3, 1809 – March 1, 1876) was an American merchant and politician from New York.

== Life ==
He was the son of William Pitt Platt (1771–1835, son of Zephaniah Platt) and Hannah Kent (sister of Chancellor James Kent).

On October 14, 1830, he married Elizabeth S. Freligh (1810–1856). They had four daughters, and one son: John Freligh Platt (1837–1858), who died while a senior at Williams College.

In 1847, he began manufacturing of iron near the Saranac River from iron ore mined west of Plattsburgh. He built plank roads to connect the iron works with the city and Clinton State Prison and employed prison inmates to work in his plant.

In 1852, he built a railroad from Plattsburgh to the Canada–US border which connected the city with Montréal. After his first wife's death, he married on May 20, 1858, her half-sister Margaret Anne Freligh (1814–1908).

He was a Republican member of the New York State Senate (16th District) in 1866 and 1867. In 1868, he ran for presidential elector on the Ulysses S. Grant ticket, but New York was won by Democrat Horatio Seymour. In 1873, he was elected an Inspector of State Prisons, and died in office.

== Sources ==
- The New York Civil List compiled by Franklin Benjamin Hough, Stephen C. Hutchins and Edgar Albert Werner (1867; pages 444 and 447)
- Google Books Life Sketches of State Officers, Senators, and Members of Assembly in the State of New York in 1867 by S. R. Harlow and H. H. Boone (pages 138f; Weed, Parsons & Co., Albany NY, 1867)
- THE SYRACUSE CONVENTION in NYT on July 9, 1868 [gives erroneously "Moses R. Platt"]
- Platt genealogy, at RootsWeb

New York State Senate
Preceded by Palmer E. Havens	New York State Senate; 16th District; 1866–1867	Succeeded by Matthew Hale
