= Silas Belden Dutcher =

American public works administrator (1829–1909)

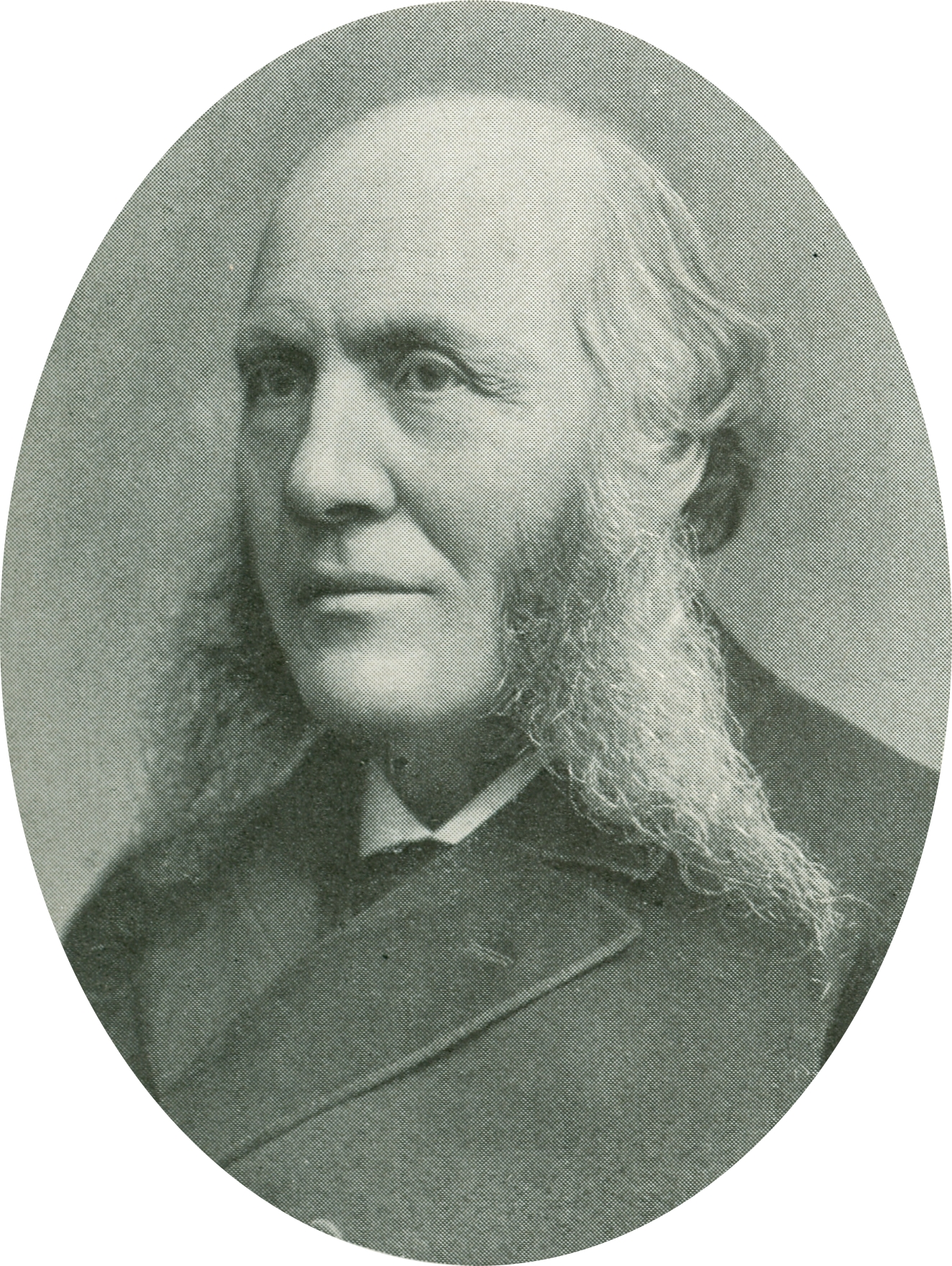

New York State Superintendent of Public Works
- In office January 15, 1880 – February 13, 1883
- Appointed by: Alonzo Barton Cornell
- Preceded by: Benjamin S. W. Clark
- Succeeded by: James H. Shanahan

Personal details
- Born: July 12, 1829 Springfield, New York
- Died: February 10, 1909 (aged 79) Brooklyn, New York
- Spouse: Rebecca Jacobs Alwaise (m. 1859–1909)

Silas Belden Dutcher (July 12, 1829 – February 10, 1909) was the New York State Superintendent of Public Works.

== Biography ==
He was born on July 12, 1829, in Springfield, New York. Dutcher attended the Cazenovia Academy. He served as the New York State Superintendent of Public Works from 1880 to 1883. He died on February 10, 1909, in Brooklyn, New York.
