= George F. Danforth =

American judge

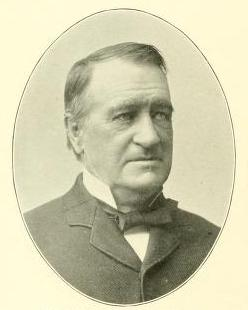
George F. Danforth

George Franklin Danforth (July 5, 1819, – September 25, 1899) was an American lawyer and politician from New York.

== Life ==
Danforth was born in Boston. He graduated from Union College in 1840. Then he studied law, was admitted to the bar and commenced practice in Rochester, NY. On April 27, 1846, he married Frances J. Wright, of Pittsford, NY.

In 1875, he ran on the Republican ticket for New York State Attorney General but was defeated by Democrat Charles S. Fairchild. In 1876, he ran for Judge of the New York Court of Appeals but was defeated by Democrat Robert Earl. In 1878, he ran again for the Court of Appeals and was elected. He was a judge of the Court of Appeals from 1879 to 1889 when he retired upon reaching the constitutional age limit of 70 years.

Afterwards he resumed his law practice and died of apoplexy in open court just after arguing a case.

== Sources ==
- G. F. DANFORTH DIES IN COURT in NYT on September 26, 1899
- George Franklin Danforth at the Historical Society of the New York Courts
