= William Creed =

William Creed may refer to:

- William Creed (priest) (1614–1663), English clergyman and academic
- William Creed (politician) (1743–1809), Irish-born ship owner, merchant and political figure in Prince Edward Island
- William F. Creed (1845–1903), public servant in New York
