= Charles T. Trowbridge =

American politician (1835–1907)

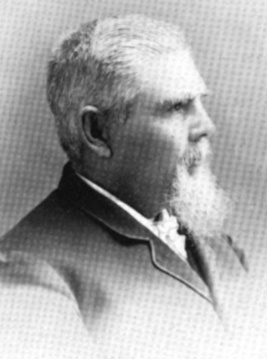

Member of the New York State Assembly
- In office 1879
- Constituency: Kings County, 4th District

Personal details
- Born: Charles Tyler Trowbridge; January 10, 1835 Morris Plains, New Jersey
- Died: December 24, 1907 (aged 72) Saint Paul, Minnesota
- Resting place: Lakewood Cemetery
- Party: Republican
- Spouses: Emeline Haviland Jackson (m. 1857; died 1858) Jane Pooler Martin (m. 1861)
- Occupation: Politician, military officer

Charles Tyler Trowbridge (January 10, 1835 – December 24, 1907) was an American politician from New York. He was the first organizer and commander of black soldiers in the American Civil War.

== Life ==
Trowbridge was born on January 10, 1835, in Morris Plains, New Jersey, the son of Elijah Freeman Trowbridge and Temperance Ludlow Muchmore.

In 1854, Trowbridge moved to Brooklyn with his parents. He worked as an apprentice for a mason and builder. Shortly after finishing his apprenticeship, he went to the building business until the start of the Civil War.

Trowbridge enlisted in the 1st New York Volunteer Engineer Regiment in December 1861, and was mustered in as a sergeant in Company F. He served as an orderly for General David Hunter and went with the regiment to the coast of South Carolina. There, he began drilling the slaves that came to the camp as refugees. In May 1862, he was made captain of a provisional organization, the First South Carolina Volunteer Infantry. The unit was disbanded in August due to pressure from President Abraham Lincoln and the War Department, since the policy at the time didn't allow for black soldiers. The regiment was reorganized in November, with Trowbridge as captain of Company A, where his brother John Augustine also served. In 1863, he was promoted to major. In 1864, he took command of the regiment and was promoted to lieutenant colonel. The unit by then was known as the 33rd United States Colored Infantry Regiment. He fought in the Siege of Morris Island and the capture of Charleston. He was popular with his troops and gave regular speeches on the equality of races. He was the first person to organize and command black troops during the Civil War, but Colonel Shaw's unit was the first to be formally mustered in.

After the War, he returned to Brooklyn. In 1872, he was elected alderman. In 1874, he was re-elected alderman and elected town supervisor. In the 1876 New York state election, he was the Republican candidate for New York State Prison Inspector. In 1878, he was elected to the New York State Assembly as a Republican, representing the Kings County 4th District. He served in the Assembly in 1879. In 1882, he moved to Minneapolis and worked as a contracting brick mason. In 1901, he was appointed custodian of the old Minnesota State Capitol, where he lived for the rest of his life.

In 1857, Trowbridge married Emeline Haviland Jackson. They had one daughter, Ida Emeline. Emeline died in 1858. In 1861, he married Jane Pooler Martin. Their children were Jennie Elizabeth, Annie Elford, Charles Henry, and Josephine Temperance. He was a member of the Grand Army of the Republic and the Military Order of the Loyal Legion of the United States.

Trowbridge died in his room in the old Minnesota State Capitol on December 24, 1907. He was buried in Lakewood Cemetery.

New York State Assembly
Preceded by Charles J. Henry (New York politician)	New York State Assembly; Kings County, 4th District; 1879	Succeeded by John M. Clancy
