= Rodney Crowley =

Rodney Crowley may refer to:

- Rodney Crowley (tennis) (1958–1991), American tennis player
- Rodney R. Crowley (1836–1913), American lawyer and politician from New York
