= William F. Creed =

William F. Creed (1845 - November 8, 1903) of Malone, New York, was appointed auditor at the Manhattan Custom House by Daniel Magone, the Collector of the Port of New York. Later he was the deputy New York State Superintendent of Banks taking over the duties of Rodney Rufus Crowley.

== Biography ==
He was born in 1845. He was a cashier at the Farmers National Bank of Malone, New York, then worked for Roswell Pettibone Flower in Manhattan.

He was appointed auditor at the Manhattan Custom House by Daniel Magone, the Collector of the Port of New York.

He died on November 8, 1903, in Plattsburgh, New York.
