= Christopher A. Walrath =

American politician (c. 1830–1897)

Christopher A. Walrath (c. 1830 - 1897) was an American merchant and politician from New York.

== Life ==
He lived in Oneida, Madison County, New York.

He was a director of the First National Bank of Oneida when it was first organized in 1864.

In 1872, he ran as a Democrat for presidential elector on the Horace Greeley ticket, jointly nominated by Democrats and Liberal Republicans, but New York was carried by Ulysses S. Grant. He was a delegate to the 1876 Democratic National Convention.

In 1875, he was elected on the Democratic ticket a Canal Commissioner. On December 2, 1875, Canal Commissioner Reuben W. Stroud died, and Walrath was appointed to the vacancy, thus anticipating the succession for about a month. The office of Canal Commissioner was abolished by an amendment to the New York State Constitution in 1876, pending the appointment of a Superintendent of Public Works. The Canal Commissioners remained in office until February 8, 1878, when the first Superintendent of Public Works, Benjamin S. W. Clark, qualified to take over the duties from the remaining two Canal Commissioners Walrath and Darius A. Ogden.

== Sources ==
- History of Madison County, at RootsWeb
- Lenox business directory for 1868, at RootsWeb
- THE GREELEYITES in NYT on September 6, 1872
- THE SYRACUSE CONVENTION in NYT on September 18, 1875
- Political Graveyard (surname misspelled as "Wolrath")
