= Darius A. Ogden =

American politician

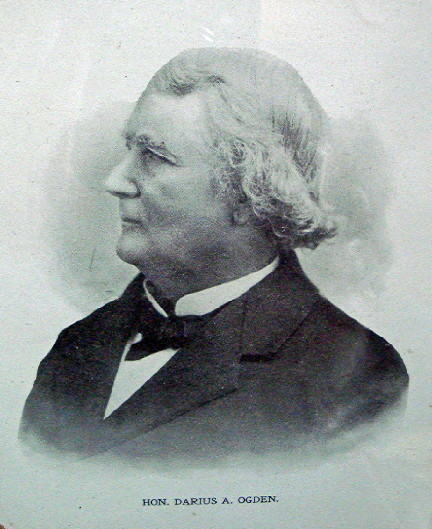
Darius A. Ogden

Darius Adams Ogden (August 14, 1813 Northville, Cayuga County, New York – May 4, 1889 Penn Yan, Yates County, New York) was an American lawyer and politician from New York.

== Life ==
He was the son of Ezekiel Ogden (1772–1824) and Abigail Brant (1775–1860). On December 18, 1834, he married Judith Ann Lawrence (1815–1895).

He was a Canal Appraiser from 1853 to 1854. Afterwards he was appointed by President Franklin Pierce U.S. Consul at Honolulu, then in the Kingdom of Hawaii, and stayed there until 1857. He was a delegate to the 1860 Democratic National Convention. He was a member of the New York State Assembly (Yates Co.) in 1862.

He helped New York Governor Samuel J. Tilden to break up the corrupt Canal Ring, and shortly afterwards was the last Canal Commissioner, elected in 1876, on the Democratic ticket. The office of Canal Commissioner was abolished by an amendment to the New York State Constitution, ratified at the same state election, pending the appointment of a Superintendent of Public Works. The Canal Commissioners remained in office until February 8, 1878, when the first Superintendent of Public Works, Benjamin S. W. Clark, qualified to take over the duties from the remaining two Canal Commissioners Ogden and Christopher A. Walrath.

He was appointed by Governor Grover Cleveland to the Prison Labor Commission in 1884. In 1885, he declined an appointment as Chief of Division in the Third Auditor's Office of the U.S. Treasury.

His son Charles E. Ogden was a member of the State Assembly from Monroe County in 1904.

== Sources ==
- The Ogden Family in America, Elizabethtown Branch (Philadelphia, 1907)
- The New York Civil List compiled by Franklin Benjamin Hough (page 43; Weed, Parsons and Co., 1858)
- The New York Civil List compiled by Franklin Benjamin Hough, Stephen C. Hutchins and Edgar Albert Werner (1867; pages 406, 496 and 517)
- SKETCHES OF THE CANDIDATES in NYT on September 1, 1876
- LEGISLATION AT ALBANY - Mr. Howe's Prison Commission Bill Passed in NYT on April 4, 1884
- NOTES FROM WASHINGTON in NYT on June 10, 1885
- Appointments by Dem. governors, in NYT on December 12, 1887
- OPENING OF LEGISLATURE in NYT on January 3, 1904
- Political Graveyard
- History of the consuls at Honolulu

== Notes ==
New York State Assembly
Preceded by Gilbert Sherer	New York State Assembly; Yates County; 1862	Succeeded by Guy Shaw
