= Tracy Beadle =

American politician (1808–1877)

Dr. Tracy Beadle (November 21, 1808 – March 22, 1877) was an American druggist, banker, and politician from Elmira, New York.

== Life ==
Beadle was born on November 21, 1808, in Otsego, New York, the son of Henry and Susan Beadle.

Beadle grew up in Cooperstown. He studied medicine with Dr. Mitchell of Norwich and his uncle Dr. Chauncey Beadle of St. Catharines, Canada and graduated from Pittsfield, Massachusetts. In 1831, he became a member of the Otsego County Medical Society and formed a partnership as physicians and apothecaries with Erastus Curtiss under the firm name Curtiss & Beadle. They had a brick store in Cooperstown. The partnership dissolved in 1833. He also began running the Green Store with Elias Root in 1832, although that partnership dissolved in 1834.

In 1835, Beadle moved to Elmira and opened a drug store there. In 1849, he and Simeon Benjamin organized the Bank of Chemung. Around that time, he and Captain Samuel Partridge bought 400 acres of land known as the Robert Covell farm in Southport. This land became the Fifth Ward of Elmira. In 1855, he was the Republican candidate for the New York State Senate in New York's 26th State Senate district. He was an alternate delegate to the 1856 Republican National Convention.

Beadle was originally a Whig. In 1861, he was elected to the New York State Assembly as a Union Republican, representing Chemung County. He served in the Assembly in 1862. He lost the 1862 reelection to the Assembly to Democratic candidate Charles Hulett. He served on a military committee for raising troops for the American Civil War in 1863. He was a delegate-at-large to the 1867-1868 New York State Constitutional Convention.

Beadle was an active member of the First Presbyterian Church. In 1833, he married Mary Worthington, daughter of Captain Ralph Worthington of Cooperstown. Their children were Ralph W., Henry, Chauncey M., and Anna B.

Beadle died at home on March 22, 1877. His funeral was held in his house, with Rev. Dr. A. W. Cowles reading Scripture, his brother Rev. Dr. Elias R. Beadle of the Second Presbyterian Church of Philadelphia offering a prayer, and Rev. Dr. W. E. Knox giving a few remarks at both the funeral and the burial in Woodlawn Cemetery.

New York State Assembly
Preceded by Lucius Robinson	New York State Assembly; Chemung County; 1862	Succeeded by Charles Hulett
