= Rodney R. Crowley =

American lawyer and politician from New York

Rodney Rufus Crowley
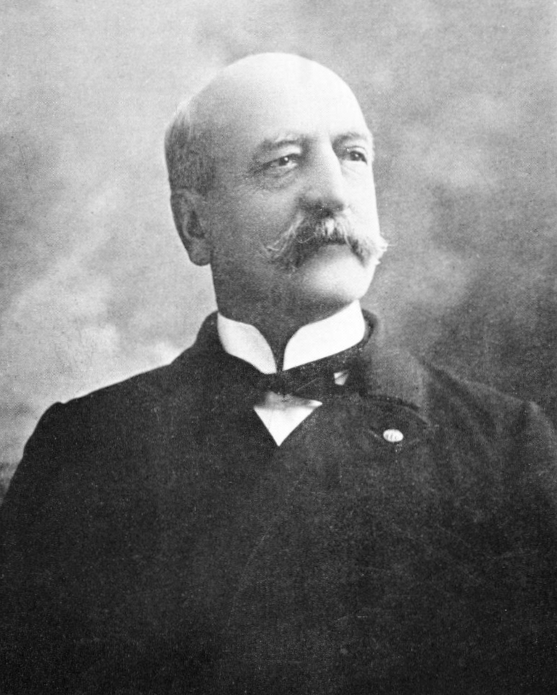

New York Inspector of State Prisons
- In office January 1, 1876 – February 17, 1877 Serving with Moss K. Platt (1876); George Wagener (1876–1877); Benjamin S. W. Clark (1876); Robert H. Anderson (1877)

Deputy New York State Superintendent of Banks
- In office October 14, 1893 – c. 1895
- Preceded by: William F. Creed

Personal details
- Born: November 12, 1836 Mount Holly, Vermont, US
- Died: February 22, 1913 (aged 76) Randolph, New York, US
- Spouse: Jane Hobart Mussey (m. 1861–1913)
- Children: Frederick Bowen Crowley (b. 1865); Mary G. Crowley (b. 1872)
- Parent(s): Parmelia and Rufus Crowley
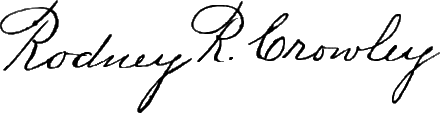
- Signature

Rodney Rufus Crowley (November 12, 1836 – February 22, 1913) was an American lawyer and politician from New York. He was a New York Inspector of State Prisons from 1876 to 1877.

== Life ==
He was born on November 12, 1836, in Mount Holly, Vermont, to Parmelia and Rufus Crowley. The family moved in 1841 to Yorkshire, New York, and in 1848 to Randolph, New York. He was admitted to the bar in 1861. He was a Justice of the Peace in Randolph in 1861, 1866 and 1872.

He fought in the American Civil War. He enrolled first on August 17, 1861, as a private, and finished the war as a captain. He was wounded in the Battle of Seven Pines and in the Battle of Gettysburg, and discharged for disability on November 6, 1863.

On September 3, 1861, he married Jane Hobert Mussey (b. 1835), and their children were Frederick Bowen Crowley (b. 1865) and Mary G. Crowley (b. 1872).

In 1867, he was appointed a Commissioner to inquire into and ascertain what damages had been done to the lands embraced in the Cattaraugus Reservation, Allegany Indian Reservation and Oil Springs Reservation by trespassers, and submitted his report to the New York State Senate in 1868.

He was Supervisor of the Town of Randolph in 1868 and 1869. From 1869 to 1871, he was Collector of Internal Revenue for the 31st District of New York. He was a Trustee of the Village of Randolph in 1874.

In 1875, he was elected on the Democratic ticket an Inspector of State Prisons, and was in office from January 1876 to February 1877. The office was abolished by a constitutional amendment in 1876, and the three last Inspectors of State Prisons - George Wagener, Crowley and Robert H. Anderson - left office upon the appointment of Louis D. Pilsbury as Superintendent of State Prisons.

On October 14, 1893, he was appointed Deputy New York State Superintendent of Banks taking over the duties of William F. Creed. He died at his home in Randolph, New York on February 22, 1913, and may have been buried in Randolph Rural Cemetery.
