= Sing Sing =

Maximum-security prison in Ossining, New York

Coordinates: 41°9′6″N 73°52′8″W

Sing Sing Correctional Facility
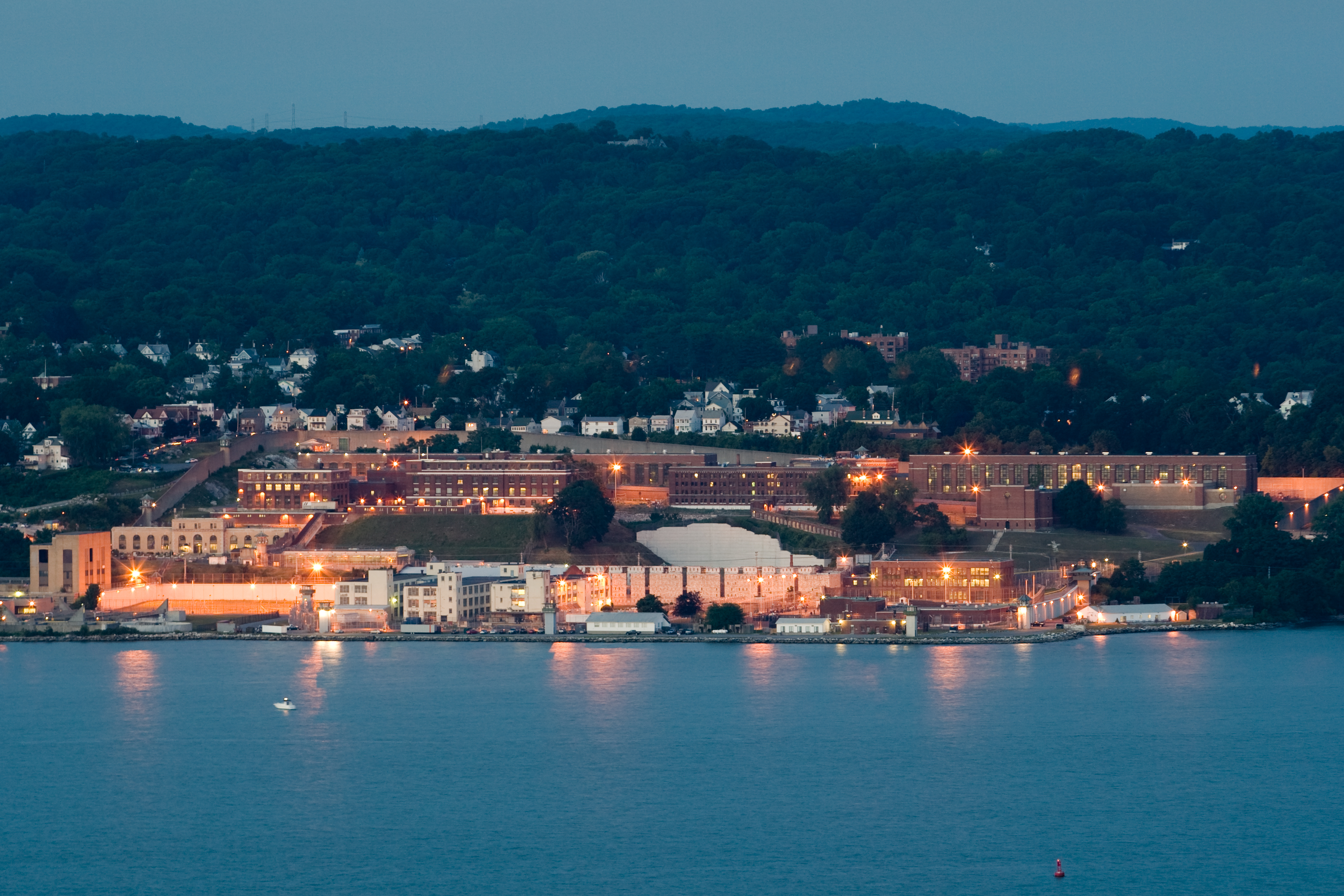
- Interactive map of Sing Sing Correctional Facility
- Location: 354 Hunter Street, Ossining, New York
- Status: Operational
- Security class: Maximum
- Capacity: 1,747
- Population: 1,576 (2019)
- Opened: 1826; 200 years ago
- Former name: Ossining Correctional Facility
- Managed by: New York State Department of Corrections and Community Supervision
- Warden: Marlyn Kopp (list of wardens)

Sing Sing Correctional Facility is a maximum-security prison for men operated by the New York State Department of Corrections and Community Supervision in the village of Ossining, New York, United States. It is about 30 miles (48 km) north of Midtown Manhattan on the east bank of the Hudson River. It holds about 1,700 inmates as of 2007, and housed the execution chamber for the State of New York for a period, with the final execution there occurring in 1963.

The name "Sing Sing" derives from the Sintsink band of the Wappinger Native American tribe from whom the New York colony purchased the land in 1685, and was formerly the name of the village. In 1970, the prison's name was changed to Ossining Correctional Facility, but it reverted to its original name in 1985. There are plans to convert the original 1825 cell block into a period museum.

The prison property is bisected by the Metro-North Railroad's four-track Hudson Line.

== History ==
=== Early years ===
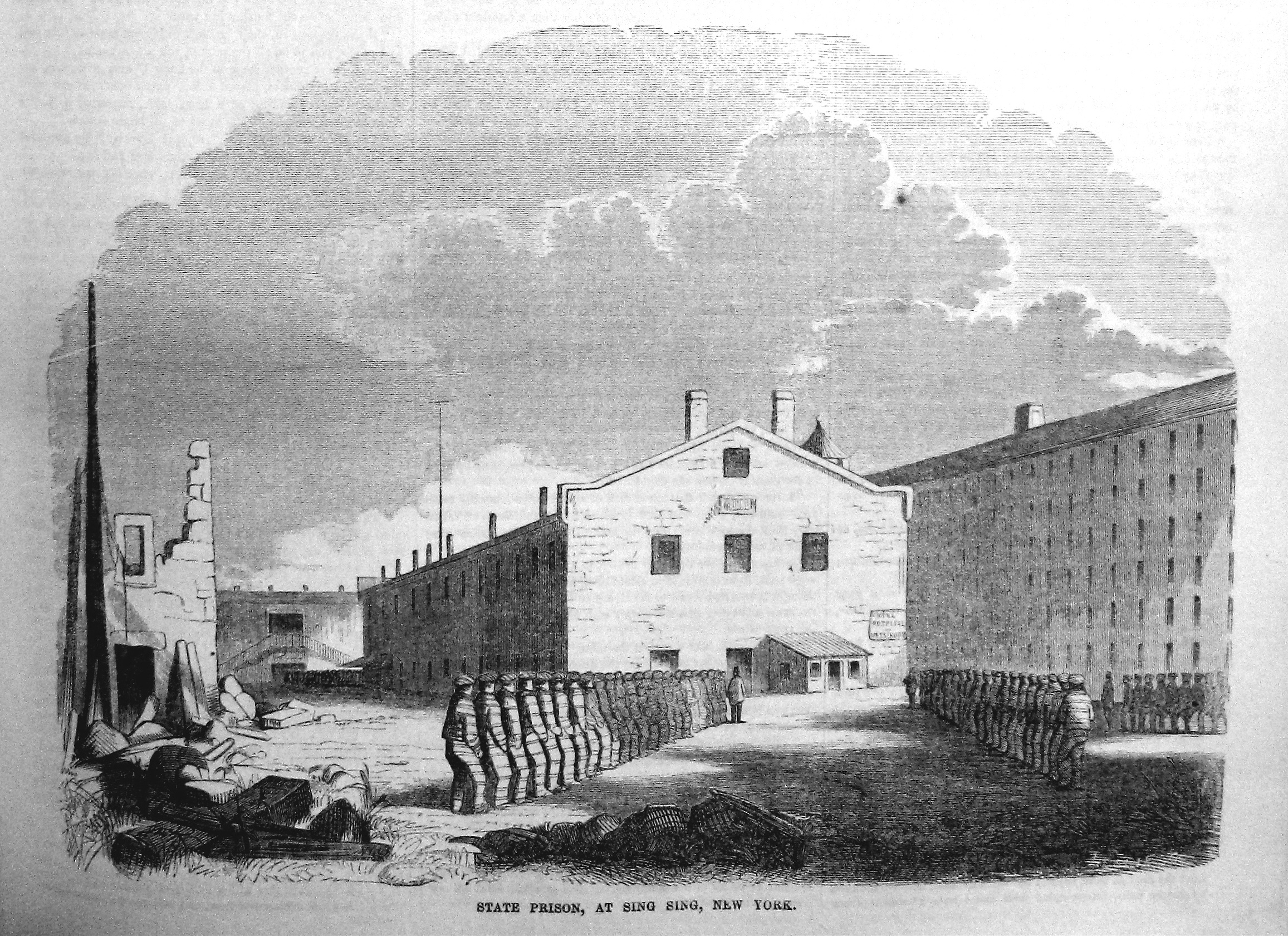
State Prison at Sing Sing, New York, an 1855 engraving

Sing Sing was the fifth prison constructed by New York state authorities. In 1824, the New York State Legislature gave Elam Lynds, warden of Auburn Prison and a former militia captain, the task of constructing a new, more modern prison. Lynds spent months researching possible locations for the prison, considering Staten Island, the Bronx, and Silver Mine Farm, an area in the town of Mount Pleasant on the banks of the Hudson River.

By May, Lynds had decided to build a prison on Mount Pleasant, near (and thus named after) a small village in Westchester County named Sing Sing, whose name came from the Wappinger (Native American) words sinck sinck, which translates to 'stone upon stone'. In March 1825, the legislature appropriated $20,100 (roughly $572,000 in 2025) to purchase the 130-acre (53 ha) site, and the project received the official stamp of approval. Lynds selected a hundred inmates from the Auburn prison for transfer and had them transported by barge via the Erie Canal and down the Hudson River on freighters. On their arrival on May 14, the site was "without a place to receive them or a wall to enclose them"; "temporary barracks, a cook house, carpenter and blacksmith's shops" were rushed to completion. To construct the permanent building, the prisoners were forced to mine the stone from an on-site marble quarry.

When it was opened in 1826, Sing Sing was considered a model prison because it turned a profit for the state. By October 1828, the prison was completed. Lynds employed the Auburn system, which imposed absolute silence on the prisoners; the system was enforced by whipping and other punishments. Quarrying continued to be the cornerstone of its early hard labor system; notable buildings such as Tarrytown's Lyndhurst mansion and New York City's Grace Church were constructed from stones mined at Sing Sing.

John Luckey, the prison chaplain around 1843, reported Lynds' actions as warden to New York Governor William H. Seward and the president of the board of inspectors, John Edmonds in order to get him removed from his position. Luckey also created a religious library in the prison, with the purpose of teaching correct moral principles.

In 1844, the New York Prison Association was inaugurated to monitor state prison administration. The Association was made up of reformers interested in the rehabilitation of prisoners through humane treatment. Eliza Farnham obtained a position in charge of the women's ward at Sing Sing largely on the recommendation of these reformers. She overturned the strictly silent practice in prison and introduced social engagement to shift concern more toward the future instead of dwelling on the criminal past. She included novels by Charles Dickens in Luckey's religious library, novels the chaplain did not approve of. This was the first documented expansion of the prison library to include moral teachings from secular literature.

=== After 1900 ===
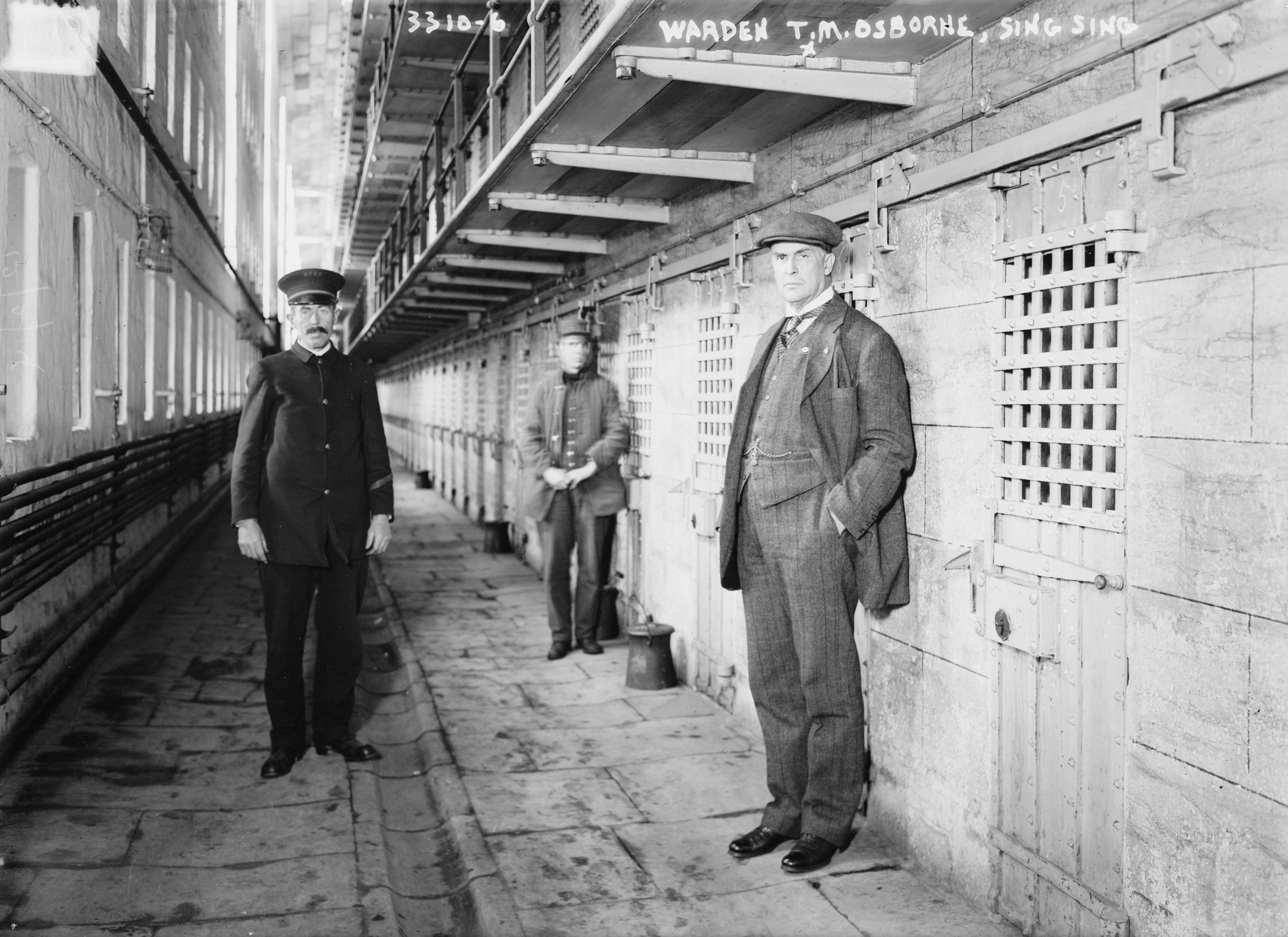
Warden T. M. Osborne, c. 1915

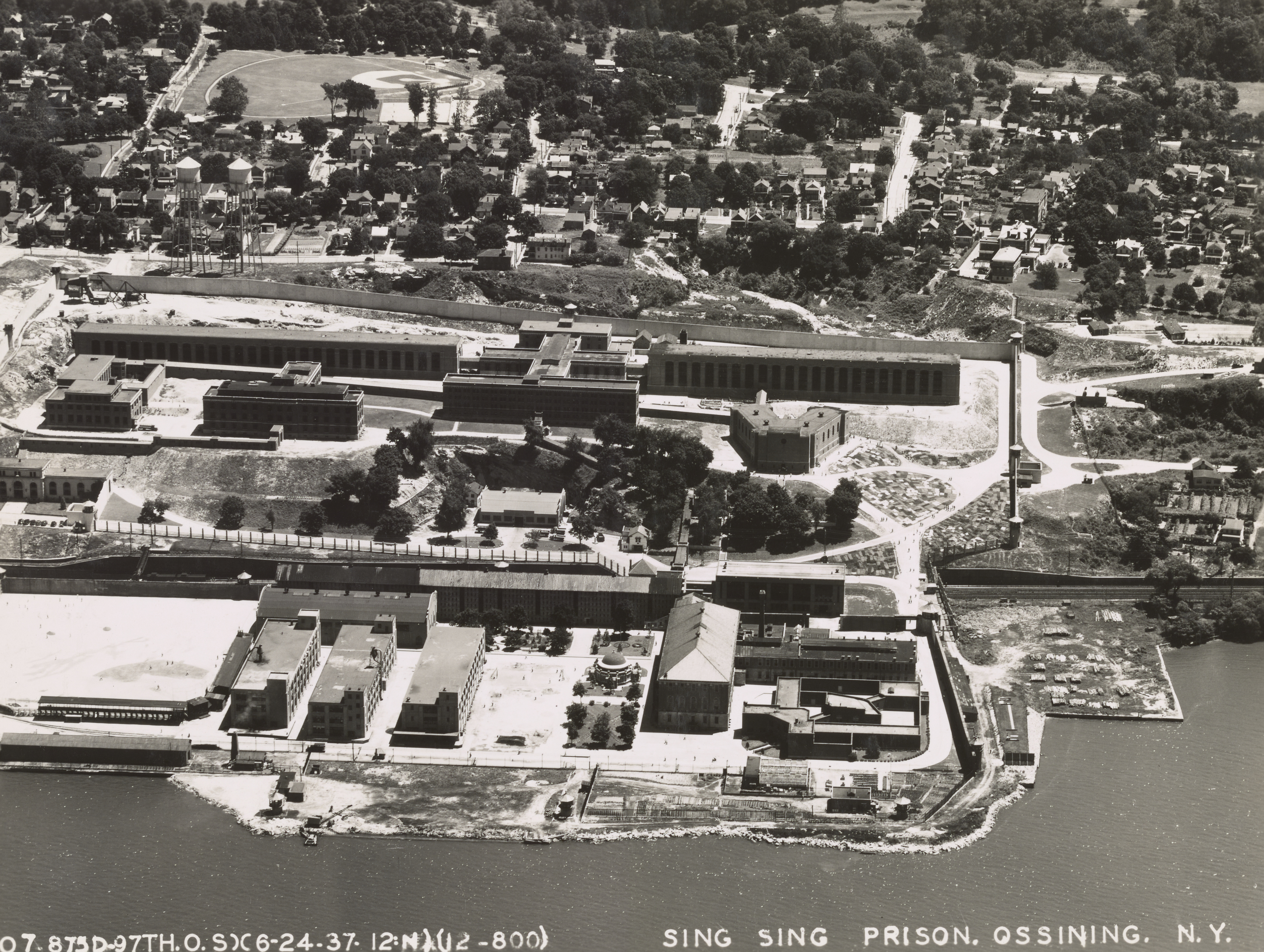
Aerial view of Sing Sing, 1937

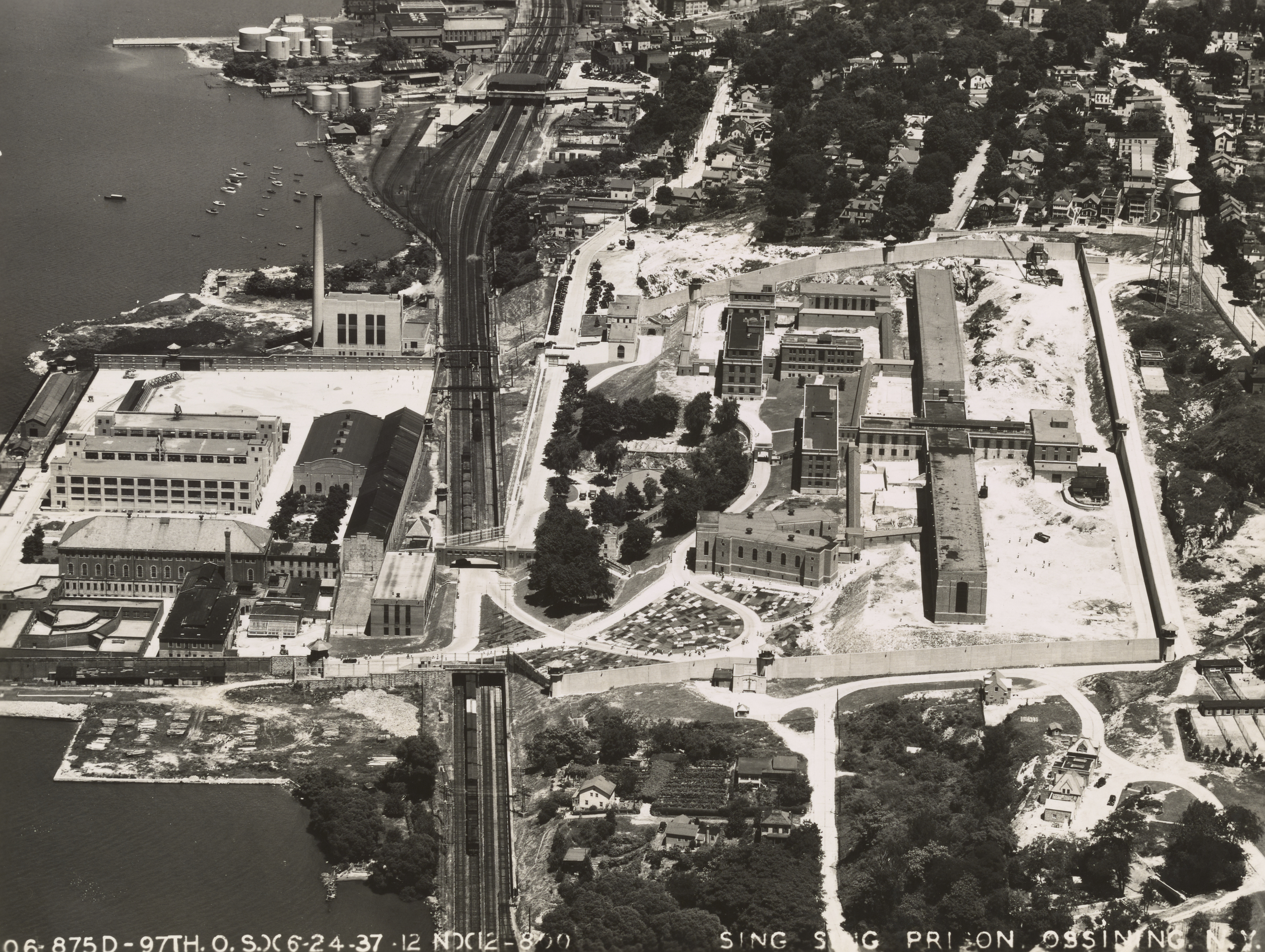
Aerial view of Sing Sing, 1937 (alternate view)

Thomas Mott Osborne's tenure as warden of Sing Sing was brief but dramatic. Osborne arrived in 1914 with a reputation as a radical prison reformer. His report of a week-long incognito stay inside New York's Auburn Prison indicted traditional prison administration in merciless detail. During his time in Sing Sing he wrote his book Society and Prisons: Some Suggestions for a New Penology, which influenced the discussion of prison reform and contributed to a change in societal perceptions of incarcerated individuals.

Prisoners who had bribed officers and intimidated other inmates lost their privileges under Osborne's regime. One of them conspired with powerful political allies to destroy Osborne's reputation, even succeeding in getting him indicted for a variety of crimes and maladministration. After Osborne triumphed in court, his return to Sing Sing was a cause for wild celebration by the inmates.

Another notable warden was Lewis Lawes. He was offered the position of warden in 1919, accepted in January 1920, and remained for 21 years as Sing Sing's warden. While warden, Lawes brought about reforms and turned what was described as an "old hellhole" into a modern prison with sports teams, educational programs, new methods of discipline, and more. Several new buildings were constructed during the years Lawes was warden. Lawes retired in 1941 and died six years later.

In 1943, the old cellblock was closed and the metal bars and doors were donated to the war effort.

In 1989, the institution was accredited for the first time by the American Correctional Association, which established a set of national standards by which it judged every correctional facility. As of 2019, Sing Sing housed approximately 1,500 inmates, employed about 900 people, and hosted over 5,000 visitors per month. The original 1825 cell block is no longer used, and in 2002, plans were announced to turn it into a museum. In April 2011, there were talks of closing the prison to take advantage of its valuable real estate.

== Executions ==
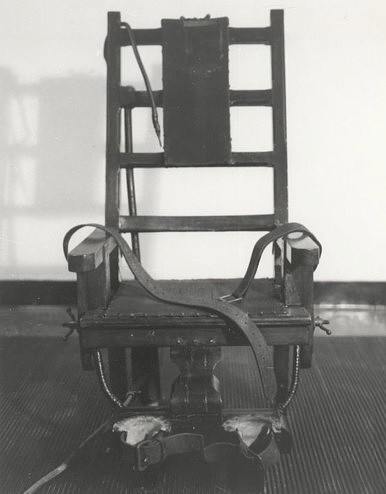
"Old Sparky," the electric chair at Sing Sing prison in the early 20th century

In total, 614 men and women – including four inmates under federal death sentences – were executed by electric chair at Sing Sing until the abolition of the death penalty in 1972. After a series of escapes from death row, a new Death House was built in 1920 and began executions in 1922. High-profile executions in Sing Sing's electric chair, nicknamed "Old Sparky", include Julius and Ethel Rosenberg on June 19, 1953, for espionage for the Soviet Union on nuclear weapon research, and Gerhard Puff on August 12, 1954, for the murder of an FBI agent. The last person executed in New York state was Eddie Lee Mays, for murder, on August 15, 1963.

In 1972, the United States Supreme Court ruled in Furman v. Georgia that the death penalty was unconstitutional if its application was inconsistent and arbitrary. This led to a temporary de facto nationwide moratorium (executions resumed in other states in 1977, and the death penalty was reinstated and abolished in New York in various forms over subsequent years), but the electric chair at Sing Sing remained. In the early 1970s, the electric chair was moved to Green Haven Correctional Facility in working condition, but was never used again.

== Educational programs ==
In 2013, Sing Sing Superintendent Michael Capra and NBC producer Dan Slepian worked with a group of 12 incarcerated men to start a program called "Voices From Within", created by Jon-Adrian Velazquez in an effort to "redefine what it means to pay a debt to society" Their first project was an emotional video about gun violence, where the men spoke directly to the youth in the communities from which they came. Slepian released the video in 2014 TEDxTalk at Sing Sing. The video is currently being used by various non-profits and law enforcement agencies to help prevent gun violence.

In 1996, Katherine Vockins founded Rehabilitation Through the Arts (RTA) at Sing Sing, enabling theater professionals to provide prisoners with a curriculum of year-round theater-related workshops. It has produced several plays at Sing Sing open to prisoners and community guests and has shown that the use of dramatic techniques leads to significant improvements in the cognitive behavior of the program's participants and a reduction in recidivism once paroled. Its impact on social and institutional behavior was formally evaluated by the John Jay College for Criminal Justice, in collaboration with the NY State Department of Corrections. Led by Dr. Lorraine Moller, Professor of Speech and Drama at John Jay, the study found that it had a positive impact on prisoner Pavle Stanimirovic, one of the program's first participants, that "the longer the inmate was in the program, the fewer violations he committed." RTA currently operates at five other New York state prisons.

The Rehabilitation Through the Arts program is dramatized in the 2023 drama film Sing Sing, starring Colman Domingo alongside a cast of mainly real-life former inmates.

The organization Hudson Link for Higher Education in Prison provides college courses to incarcerated people to help reduce recidivism and poverty and strengthen families and communities. In 1998, as part of the get-tough-on-crime campaign, state and federal funding for college programs inside the prison was stopped. Understanding the positive effects of education in the transformation and rehabilitation of incarcerated people, inmates at Sing Sing Correctional Facility reached out to religious and academic volunteers to develop a college degree-granting program. Under Anne Reissner, Hudson Link for Higher Education in Prison was founded to restore college education at Sing Sing through private funding.

== Football team ==
In 1931, new prison reforms permitted Sing Sing State Penitentiary prisoners to partake in recreation opportunities. The baseball and football teams, and the vaudeville presentations and concerts, were funded through revenue from paid attendance. Tim Mara, the owner of the New York Giants, sponsored the Sing Sing Black Sheep, Sing Sing's football team. Mara provided equipment and uniforms and players to tutor them in fundamentals. He helped coach them the first season. Known as the Black Sheep, they were also sometimes called the Zebras. All games were "home" games, played at Lawes Stadium, named for Warden Lewis E. Lawes. In 1935, the starting quarterback and two other starters escaped the morning before a game.

Alabama Pitts was their starting quarterback and star for the first four seasons, but then finished his sentence. Upon release, Alabama Pitts played for the Philadelphia Eagles in 1935. In 1932, "graduate" Jumbo Morano was signed by the Giants and played for the Paterson Nighthawks of the Eastern Football League. In 1934, State Commissioner of Correction, Walter N. Thayer banned the advertising of activities at the prison, including football games. On November 19, 1936, a new rule banned ticket sales. No revenues could come from show and sports event ticketing. These funds had been paying for disbursements to prisoners' families, especially the kin of those executed, and for equipment and coaches' salaries. With this new edict, the season ended and prisoners were no longer allowed to play football outside Sing Sing.

== Museum ==
Plans to turn a portion of Sing Sing into a museum date back to 2002, when local officials sought to turn the old powerhouse into the museum, linked by a tunnel to a retired cell block, for $5 million. In 2007, the village of Ossining applied for $12.5 million in federal money for the project, at the time expected to cost $14 million. The proposed museum would display the Sing Sing story as it unfolded over time.

== Contribution to American English ==
The expression "up the river" to describe someone in prison or heading to prison derives from the practice of sentencing people convicted in New York City to serve their terms in Sing Sing prison, which is located up the Hudson River from the city. The slang expression dates from 1891.

== Wardens ==
The wardens of Sing Sing are appointed by the Commissioner of the Department of Corrections and Community Supervision.

- Elam Lynds (1825–1830)
- Robert Wiltse (1830–1840)
- David L. Seymour (1840–1843)
- William H. Peck (1843–1845)
- Hiram P. Rowell (1845–1848)
- Chauncey Smith (1848–1849)
- Edward L. Potter (January, 1849)
- Alfred R. Booth (July, 1849)
- Munson J. Lockwood (1850–1855)
- C. A. Batterman (1855–1856)
- William Beardsley (1856–1862)
- Gaylord B. Hubbell (1862–1864)
- Thomas E. Sutton (1864–1865)
- Stephen H. Johnson (1865–1868)
- David P. Forrest (1868–1869)
- Henry Clay Nelson (1869–1870)
- E. M. Russell (1870–1872)
- Henry C. Nelson (1872–1873)
- Gaylord B. Hubbell (1873–1874)
- James Williamson (September 1874)
- Alfred Walker (October 1874)
- George R. Youngs (1876–1877)
- Charles Davis (February 1877)
- Benjamin S. W. Clark (March 1877)
- Charles Davis (1877–1880)
- Augustus A. Brush (1880–1891)
- W. R. Brown (1891–1893)
- Charles F. Durston (1893–1894)
- Omar Van Leuven Sage (1894–1899)
- Addison Johnson (1899–1907)
- Jesse D. Frost (1907–1911)
- John S. Kennedy (1911–1913)
- James Connaughton* (June 1913) acting warden
- James M. Clancy (1913–1914)
- Thomas McCormick (June 1914)
- George Standish Weed* (October 1914) acting warden
- Thomas Mott Osborne (1914–1915)
- George Washington Kirchwey (1915)
- Thomas Mott Osborne (July 1916)
- Calvin Derrick (October 1916)
- William H. Moyer (1916–1919)
- Edward V. Brophy (April 1919)
- Daniel J. Grant* (1919–1920) acting warden
- Lewis Edward Lawes (1920–1941)
- Robert John Kirby (1941–1944)
- William F. Snyder (1944–1950)
- Wilfred Louis Denno (1950–1967)
- John T. Deegan (1967–1969)
- James L. Casscles (1969–1972)
- Theodore Schubin (1972–1975)
- Joseph Higgins* (July 1975) acting warden
- Harold Butler (October 1975)
- William G. Gard (1975–1977)
- Walter Fogg* (August 1977) acting warden
- Stephen Dalsheim (1977–1980)
- Wilson E.J. Walters (1980–1983)
- James E. Sullivan (1983–1988)
- John P. Keane (1988–1997)
- Charles Greiner (1997–2000)
- Brian S. Fischer (2000–2007)
- Luis Marshall (2007-2009)
- Dawson J.W. Brown* (January 2009 - July 2009) acting Superintendent
- Philip Heath (2009-2012)
- Michael Capra (2012–2023)
- Marlyn Kopp (2023–present)

* denotes an acting warden who holds the position until a full-time warden can be appointed

== Gallery ==
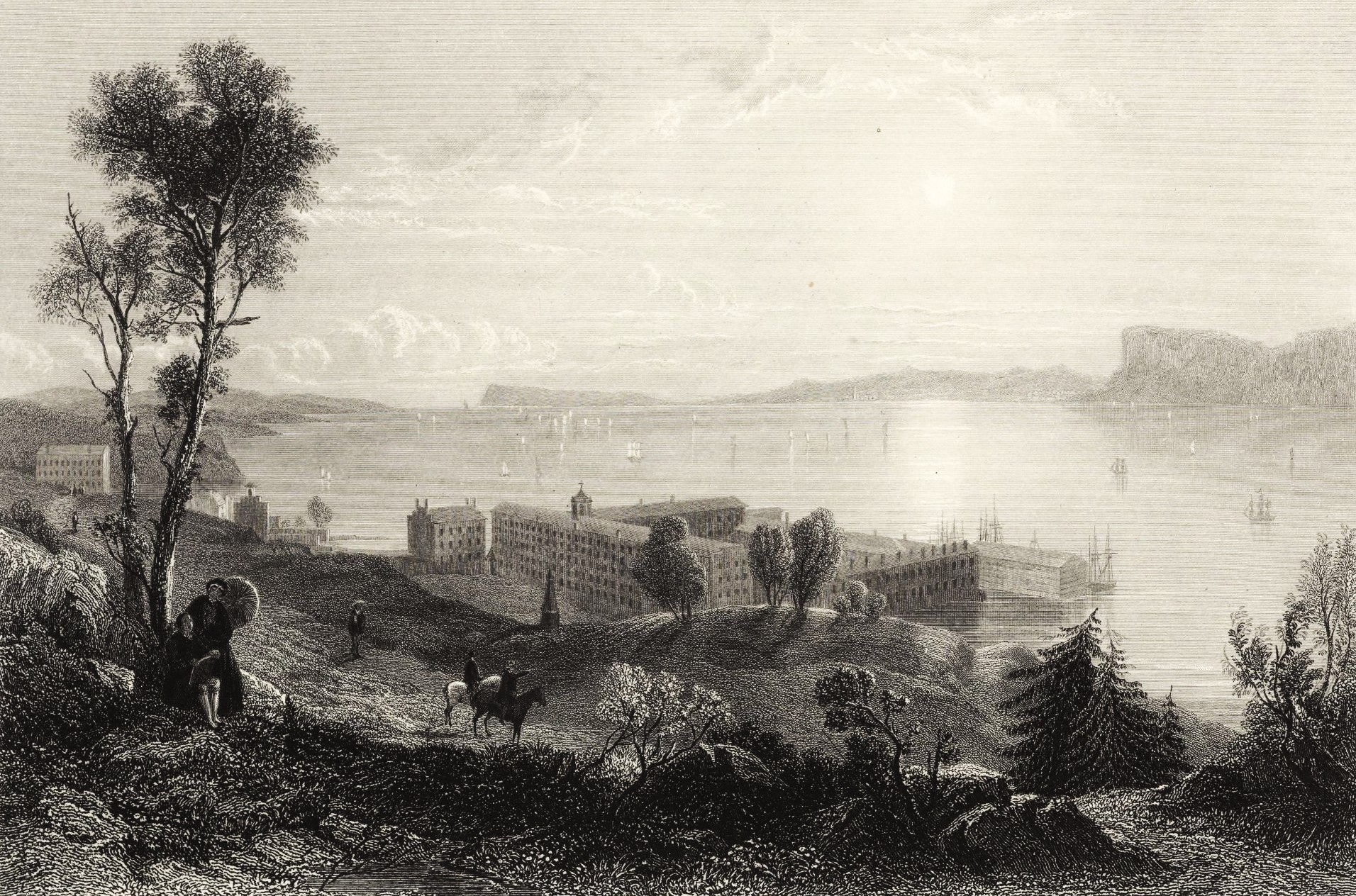
View from afar, 1857 engraving

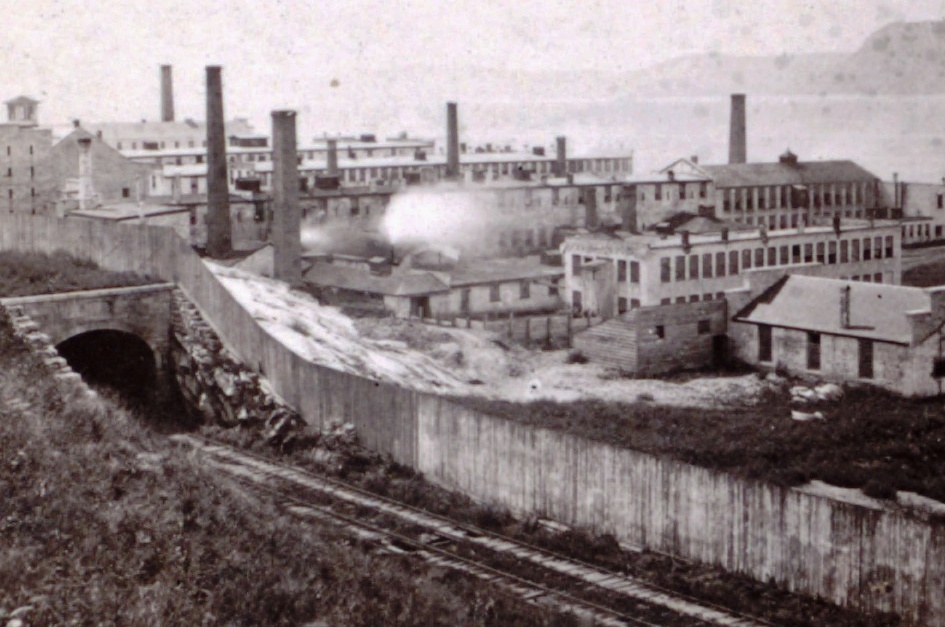
The prison and workshops, c. 1863–1885

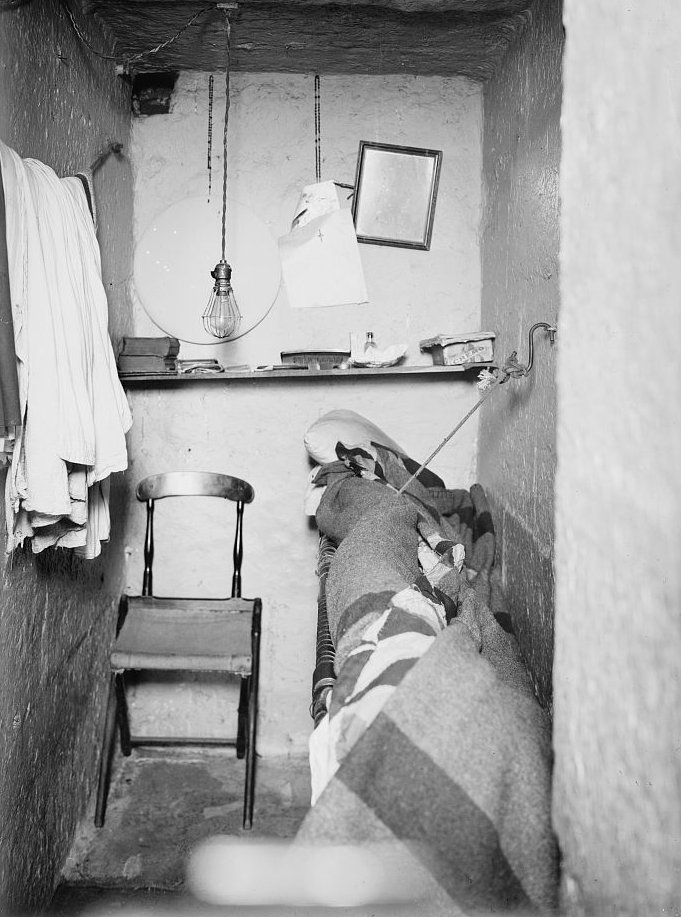
A cell in the older facility

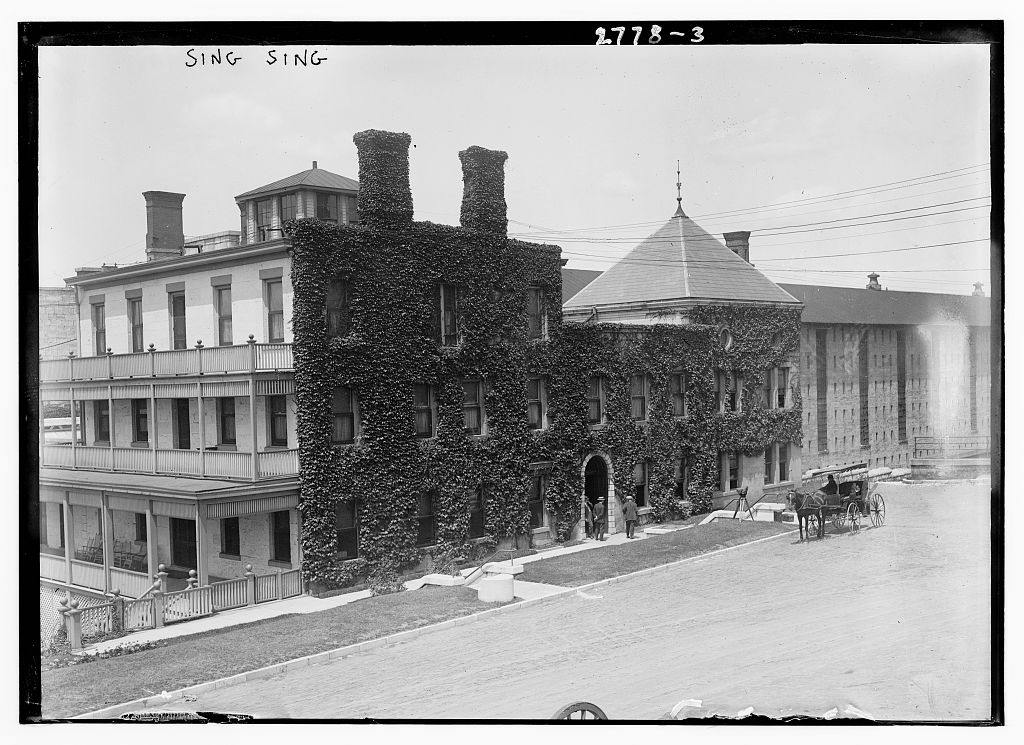
Sing Sing after the 1913 fire

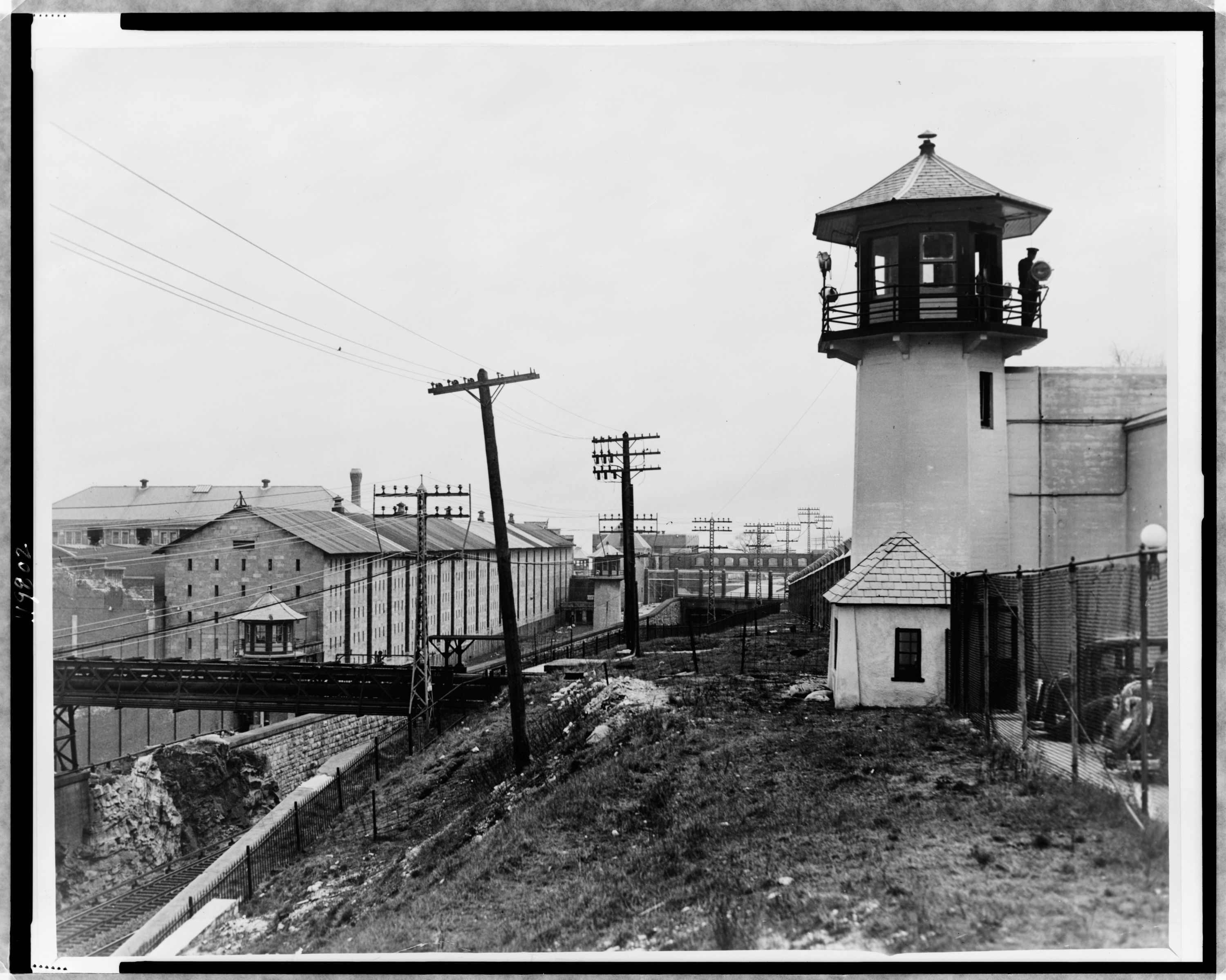
Old cell block, c. 1938

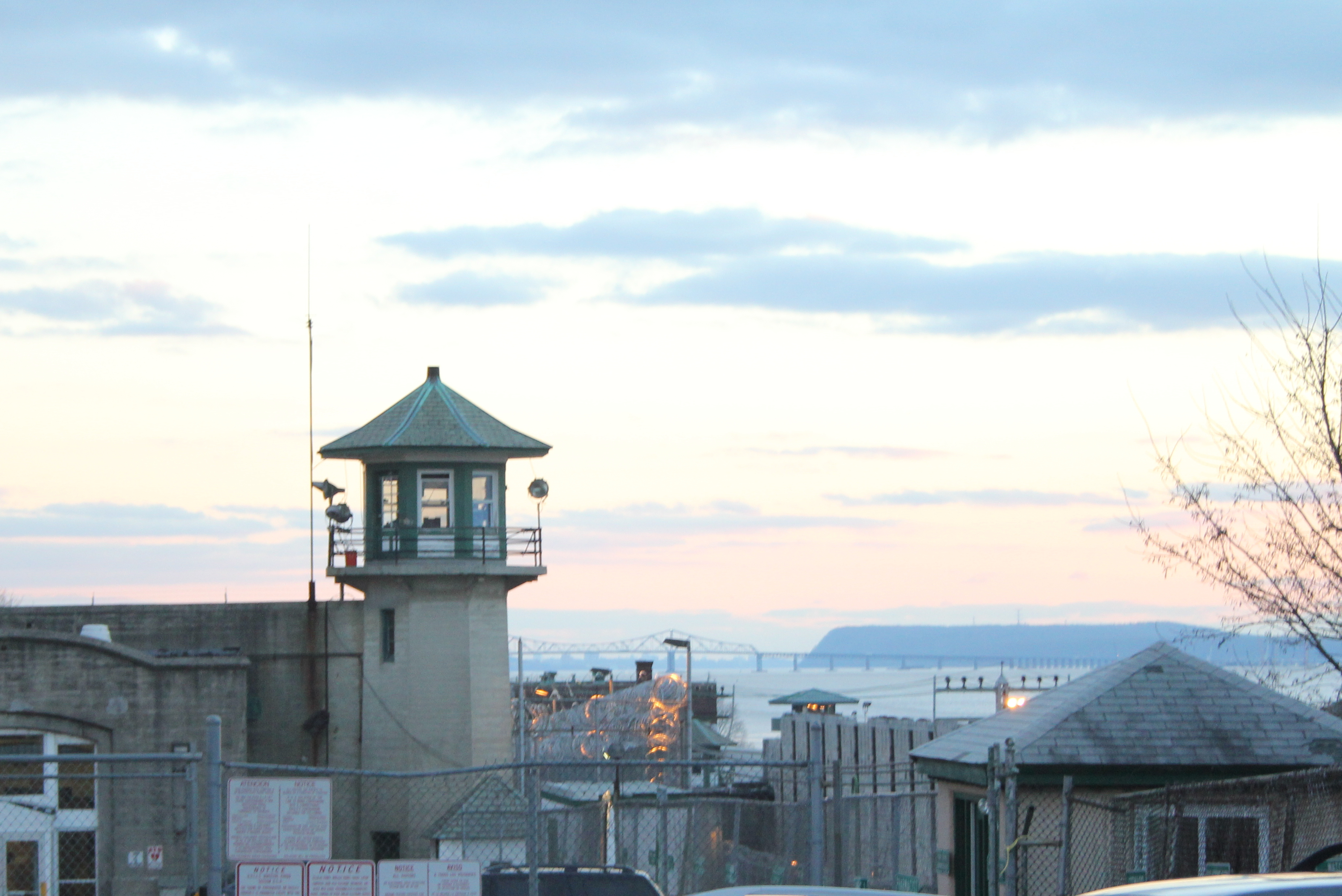
Guard tower in 2014. The Hudson River and the original Tappan Zee Bridge are in the background.

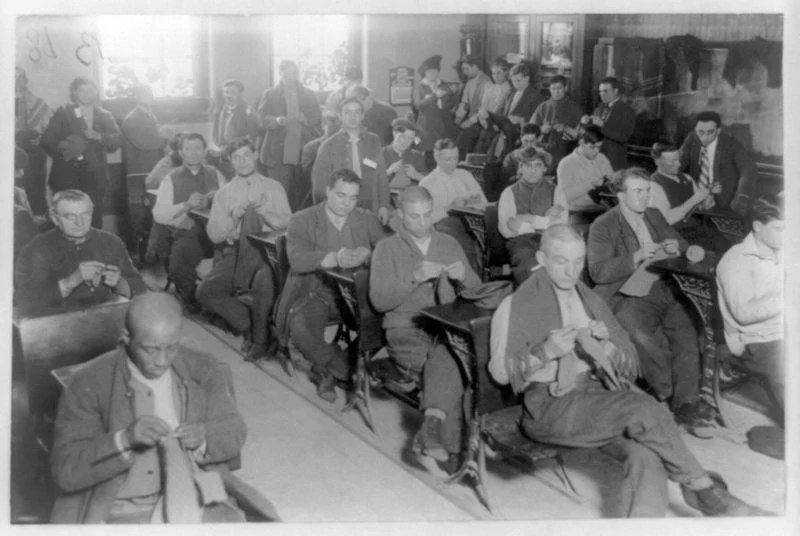
Prisoners at Sing Sing knitting socks for soldiers in 1915

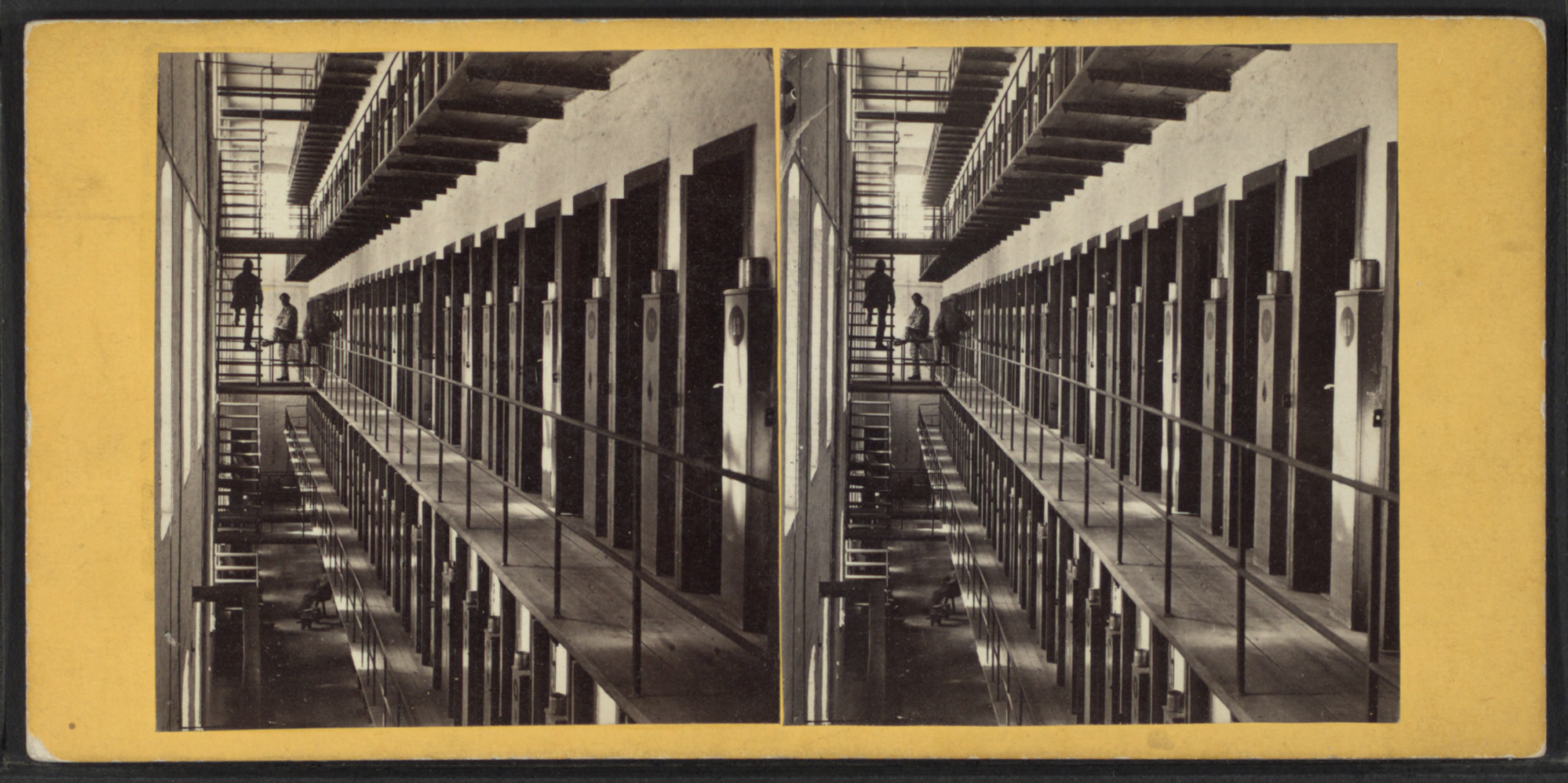
Stereoscopic view of Sing Sing Prison, interior looking down cell block

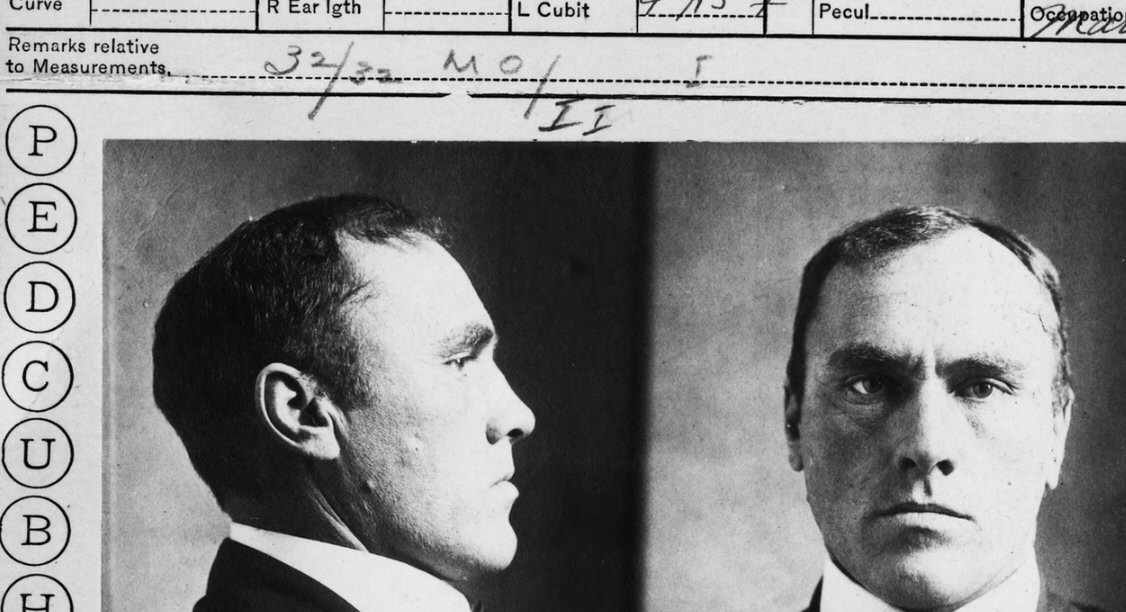
Carl Panzram 1923 inmate

== Notable inmates ==
- Frank Abbandando and Harry Maione, hitmen and members of Murder, Inc., both executed in 1942.
- George Appo, 19th-century pickpocket and con artist.
- Charles Becker, NYPD Lieutenant convicted for the murder of Herman Rosenthal and executed at Sing Sing on July 30, 1915.
- Maria Barbella, the second woman sentenced to death by electric chair. The sentence was later overruled as her attorneys argued the judge overseeing her first trial pushed jurors to convict in his instructions. After a second trial she was found not guilty and was set free in 1896.
- Robert Bierenbaum, convicted in October 2000 of having murdered his estranged wife, Gail Katz-Bierenbaum, 15 years earlier.
- Louis Buchalter, American mobster and head of Murder, Inc. who served 18 months at Sing Sing for grand larceny. On January 22, 1920, he returned to Sing Sing on a 30 month sentence for attempted burglary. Buchalter was released on March 16, 1922. He was later executed for murder in 1944.
- Elmer "Trigger" Burke, hitman, executed in 1958.
- George Caldwell, Architect employed at Carrère and Hastings. Convicted in March 1903 on Sodomy charges after raid on Ariston Baths (People vs Galbert). Caldwell was pardoned by then NY Governor Odell in November 1903.
- Louis Capone and Emanuel Weiss, members of Murder, Inc., both executed in 1944.
- Frank Cirofici, Harry Horowitz, Jacob Seidenshner, and Louis Rosenberg, accomplices of Charles Becker, were all executed in 1914.
- Charles Chapin, editor of New York Evening World, convicted of the murder of his wife in 1918, popularly known as the "Rose Man of Sing Sing".
- Eva Coo, American brothel keeper, innkeeper, and speakeasy operator who was convicted of murdering a hired hand, and executed in 1935
- Mary Frances Creighton, suspected serial killer, executed, along with Everett Applegate, in 1936.
- Robert John Cronin, raped and impregnated an 11-year-old girl from Niskayuna, New York, in 2018, serving a 24-year sentence.
- Monk Eastman, New York gangster and leader of the Eastman Gang, was sentenced to 10 years at Sing Sing in 1904.
- Raymond Fernandez and Martha Beck, so-called Lonely Heart Killers, were both executed in 1951.
- Albert Fish, early-20th century American serial killer, child kidnapper/rapist/mutilator, cannibal, forger, con artist and obscene letter sender, executed in 1936.
- Paul Geidel, formerly, the longest-serving prison inmate in the United States whose sentence ended with his parole, who served 68 years and 296 days in various New York state prisons.
- Martin Goldstein and Harry Strauss, hitmen and members of Murder, Inc., were both executed in 1941.
- Mary Jones, a 19th-century transgender prostitute who was a center of media attention for coming to court wearing feminine attire.
- Leroy Keith, serial killer, executed in 1959.
- Fritz Julius Kuhn, German former leader of the German American Bund, incarcerated at Sing Sing various times between 1939-1945 and deported to Germany.
- Angelo LaMarca, convicted of the kidnapping and murder of Peter Weinberger, executed in 1958.
- James Larkin, political activist and union leader sentenced to five to ten years in Sing Sing prison for "criminal anarchy" in 1919.
- John Katehis, convicted for the murder of George Weber.
- Charles "Lucky" Luciano, head of the Genovese crime family convicted on 62 counts of compulsory prostitution in 1936. Was later moved to Clinton Correctional Facility, until he was deported back to Italy.
- Clarence Maclin, sentenced to 17 years for a robbery conviction in the mid-1990's, and after his release became a screenwriter and actor, writing and starring in the 2023 Academy Award nominated film Sing Sing.
- Michael Magnan, murdered a passenger in a taxi in 2012.
- Eddie Lee Mays, executed in 1963, became the last person executed in New York.
- Joesph Pabon, murdered Eridania Rodriguez in 2009.
- Carl Panzram, killer
- George C. Parker, infamous con man known for "selling" the Brooklyn Bridge.
- John Roche, serial killer and rapist, executed in 1956.
- Julius and Ethel Rosenberg, executed in 1953 for conspiring to pass secrets of the American atomic bomb project to the Soviet Union during World War II.
- Norman Roye, serial killer and rapist, executed in 1956.
- Hans Schmidt, executed in 1916, was the only Roman Catholic priest executed in the United States.
- Tony Sirico, actor known for his role as Paulie Gaultieri on the critically acclaimed television series The Sopranos, convicted of felony weapons possession and served 20 months of his four-year sentence at Sing Sing.
- Ruth Snyder, executed along with Henry Judd Gray in 1928, Snyder's execution was illegally photographed.
- Willie Sutton, career criminal who escaped December 11, 1932.
- Joseph Valachi, member of the American Mafia, served his first prison sentence (of approximately one year) at Sing Sing before he was 20 years old.
- Jon-Adrian Velazquez, served a 25 years to life sentence after wrongfully convicted for murder, released in 2021.
- Ferdinand Ward, Gilded Age swindler who ran a New York City investment firm with Ulysses S. Grant Jr., son of former President of the United States Ulysses S. Grant, revealed to be a Ponzi scheme that bankrupted the Grant family in 1884.
- Richard Whitney served a sentence for embezzlement at Sing Sing from 1938 until 1941.
- Frederick Charles Wood, serial killer, executed in 1963.

== See also ==
- List of reduplicated place names
- Marvin's Marvelous Mechanical Museum, which contains one of Sing Sing's electric chairs
- The Rise of the Penitentiary: Prisons and Punishment in Early America by Adam J. Hirsch
- Penitentiaries, Reformatories, and Chain Gangs by Mark Colvin
