= Alonzo B. Cornell =

American politician (1832–1904)

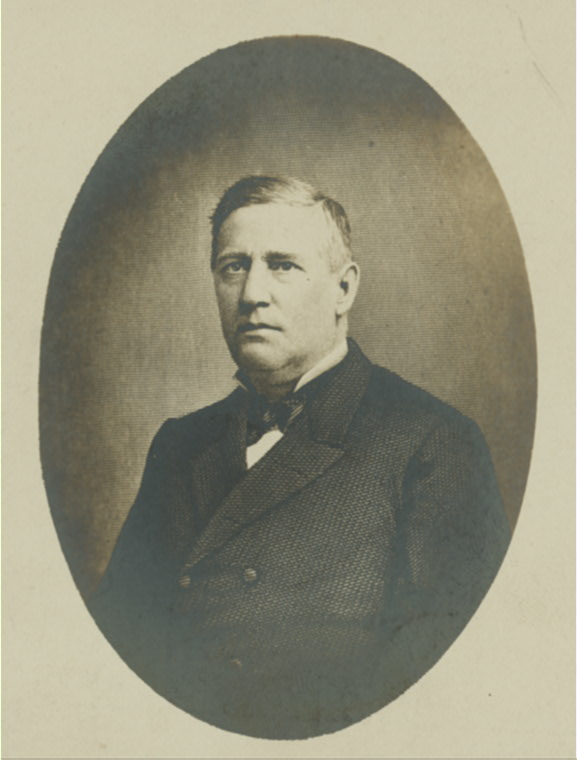

27th Governor of New York
- In office January 1, 1880 – December 31, 1882
- Lieutenant: George G. Hoskins
- Preceded by: Lucius Robinson
- Succeeded by: Grover Cleveland

Speaker of the New York State Assembly
- In office January 1, 1873 – December 31, 1873
- Preceded by: Henry Smith
- Succeeded by: James W. Husted

Member of the New York State Assembly from the New York County, 11th district
- In office January 1, 1873 – December 31, 1873
- Preceded by: Rush C. Hawkins
- Succeeded by: Knox McAfee

Personal details
- Born: Alonzo Barton Cornell; January 22, 1832 Ithaca, New York, U.S.
- Died: October 15, 1904 (aged 72) Ithaca, New York, U.S.
- Party: Republican
- Spouses: Ellen Augusta Covert (m. 1852; died 1893) Esther Elizabeth Covert (m. 1894)
- Children: 5
- Parent(s): Ezra Cornell; Mary Ann Wood Cornell
- Profession: Politician, Businessman

Alonzo Barton Cornell (January 22, 1832 – October 15, 1904) was a New York politician and businessman who was the 27th governor of New York from 1880 to 1882.

== Early years ==
Cornell was born in Ithaca, New York, on January 22, 1832. He was the eldest son of Ezra Cornell (1807–1874), the founder of Cornell University, and Mary Ann (née Wood) Cornell (1811–1891). Among his siblings was his brother Franklin C. Cornell. He attended the common schools of Ithaca and graduated from Ithaca Academy.

== Career ==
At the age of fifteen, he began a career in the field of telegraphy, later working as a manager in a telegraph office in Cleveland, Ohio. Afterwards, he owned steamboats on Cayuga Lake from 1862 to 1863. From 1864 to 1869, he was a cashier and vice president of the First National Bank of Ithaca. He was a director of the Western Union Telegraph Company, which had been co-founded by his father, from 1868 to 1876, and was its vice president from 1870 to 1876.

He was town supervisor of Ithaca in 1864–5. From 1858 until 1866, he was chairman of the Tompkins County Republican committee, and in 1866-7 was a member of the Republican state committee. He was one of the first commissioners for the erection of the new state capitol at Albany from 1868 until 1871. He was the Republican candidate for Lieutenant Governor of New York in 1868, but was defeated by the Democrat, Allen C. Beach. He was appointed by President Ulysses S. Grant as Surveyor of the Port of New York.

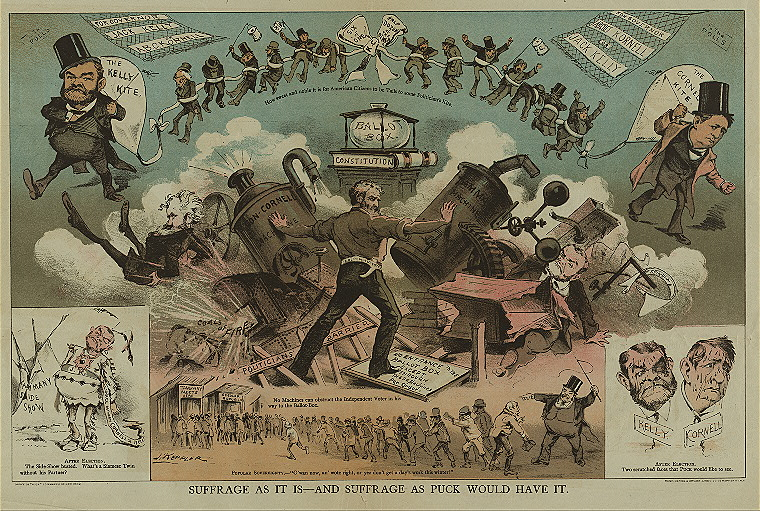
Cartoon depicting the battle between Cornell and the Tammany Hall machine

From 1870 to 1878, he was chairman of the state Republican Party. He resigned his position as Surveyor of the Port of New York to become a member of the New York State Assembly (New York Co., 11th D.) in 1873, and was elected Speaker, one of the very few times a first-term member was chosen. He was influential at the 1876 Republican National Convention which nominated Rutherford B. Hayes. In January 1877, he was appointed naval officer of the Port of New York by Grant.

Hayes, upon becoming president, directed the Treasury Department to notify Cornell that he must resign from the state and national Republican committees as a condition of remaining a naval officer. Regarding this as an invasion of his civil and political rights, Cornell declined to obey the mandate, whereupon a successor was nominated, but was rejected by the Senate. After the adjournment of the Senate in July 1878, Hayes suspended both the collector (Chester A. Arthur) and the naval officer, and their successors were finally confirmed. At the subsequent elections, Cornell was chosen Governor of New York and Arthur became Vice President of the United States.

Cornell was governor from 1880 to 1882, elected in 1879. His administration was noted for economy in public expenditures, and his vetoes of appropriation bills were beyond all precedent. Upon his recommendation, a state board of health and the state railroad commission were created, women were made eligible for school officers, a reformatory for women established, and the usury laws were modified.

The resignation of the New York senators from the U. S. Senate in 1881 provoked a bitter contest for the succession, by which the Republican Party was divided into hostile factions, the Stalwarts and the Half Breeds. Cornell's opponents prevented his re-nomination for governor.

=== Later life ===
During his latter years, Cornell lived in New York City, where he had a mansion built in the 1870s at 616 Fifth Avenue on the west side of the avenue between 49th and 50th Streets, and wrote a biography of his father in 1884.

== Personal life ==
On November 9, 1852, Cornell married Ellen Augusta Covert (1834–1893). She was the daughter of George P. Covert, a lifelong friend of his father, and Esther Elizabeth (née Bassett) Covert. Together, they were the parents of:

- Charles Ezra Cornell (1855–1947), a lawyer who married Katharine Lawyer Bouck, a granddaughter of New York Governor William C. Bouck.
- Edwin Morgan Cornell (1862–1870), who died young.
- Henry Watson Cornell (1866–1932), a lawyer who married Margaret Feek Bouck (b. 1870), also a granddaughter of New York Governor William C. Bouck.
- Marguerite Cornell, who married Arnoud Jacob Joris Van der Does de Bye, a professor who was the son of a Dutch count, in 1909.
- Roscoe Conkling Cornell, the circulation manager of the Herald and The San Francisco Examiner who married Nelle Edith Beyerle.

After the death of his first wife in 1893, he remarried on June 8, 1894, to her younger sister, Esther Elizabeth Covert (1839–1923), a native of Auburn, New York.

After suffering a stroke of apoplexy followed by Bright's disease in August 1904, Cornell died on October 15, 1904, in Ithaca, aged 72. He was interred with his father and mother in Sage Chapel on the Cornell University campus.

=== Legacy ===
Cornell's papers are held in Cornell University Library's Division of Rare and Manuscript Collections.

== Notes ==
New York State Assembly
Preceded by Rush C. Hawkins	New York State Assembly; New York County, 11th District; 1873	Succeeded by Knox McAfee
Preceded by Henry Smith	Speaker of the New York State Assembly; 1873	Succeeded by James W. Husted
Political offices
Preceded by Lucius Robinson	Governor of New York; 1880–1882	Succeeded by Grover Cleveland
Party political offices
Preceded by Hamilton Harris	Chairman of the New York Republican State Committee; 1870–1874	Succeeded by Edwin D. Morgan
Preceded by Edwin D. Morgan	Chairman of the New York Republican State Committee; 1875–1877	Succeeded by John F. Smyth
Preceded by John F. Smyth	Chairman of the New York Republican State Committee; 1878–1879	Succeeded by Chester A. Arthur
Preceded by Edwin D. Morgan	Republican nominee for Governor of New York; 1879	Succeeded by Charles J. Folger
