= Charles Davis (warden) =

Charles Davis (born circa 1837) of Broome, New York, was appointed as Warden of Sing Sing prison in 1878. He was formerly a merchant and state government official.

In 1878, Davis and another state government official were sued by Elisha Bloomer in a dispute about the ownership of 5 acres (2.0 ha) of land used by the prison.

In 1885, Davis was appointed Deputy Collector "in charge of the Fourth, or Navigation, Division" at the United States Department of the Treasury.
