= Thomas Kirkpatrick (New York politician) =

American politician

Thomas Kirkpatrick was an American politician from New York.

== Life ==
He lived in Albany, New York, and was an alderman, elected in the Tenth Ward in 1843, and Overseer of the Poor.

In 1853, he was elected, on the Whig ticket, Inspector of State Prisons, and was in office from 1854 to 1856.

He was Warden of Auburn State Prison from January 1860 to January 1864.

In 1871, he was again elected State Prison Inspector, this time on the Republican ticket. He was in office from 1872 to 1874, but was defeated for re-election in 1874.

== Sources ==
- The New York civil list: containing the names and origin of the civil divisions, and the names and dates of election or appointment of the principal state and county officers from the Revolution to the present time. Weed, Parsons and Co. 1858. p. 45.
- Franklin Benjamin Hough; Stephen C. Hutchins; Edgar Albert Werner (1867). The New-York Civil List, Containing the Names and Origin of the Civil Divisions, and the Names and Dates of Election Or Appointment of the Principal State and County Officers ... Weed, Parsons and Company. p. 411.
- Munsell, Joel (1859). The annals of Albany. J. Munsell. p. 340.
