= Robert H. Anderson (politician) =

American politician

Robert H. Anderson (c. 1831 – December 29, 1879) was an American politician from New York.

== Life ==
Anderson was born in Rochester, New York, or Pittsburgh. He learned the miller's trade, and at age 21 moved to Brooklyn to work in the flour mill of Smith, Leach & Jewell, eventually becoming Chief Miller. About 1863, the mill closed, and Anderson took charge of a flour mill on Broadway in Williamsburg, and entered local politics as a Democrat.

In 1876, he was nominated on the Democratic ticket for Inspector of State Prisons after the Republicans had nominated Charles T. Trowbridge, a mechanic from Kings County, and the Democrats felt the need to counterbalance their ticket with a like type of candidate. He was elected but was in office only for six weeks, from January to February 1877. The office was abolished by a constitutional amendment which had been ratified at the same election, and the three last Inspectors of State Prisons - George Wagener, Rodney R. Crowley and Anderson - left office upon the appointment of Louis D. Pilsbury as Superintendent of State Prisons.

In 1878, he ran on the Independent Democratic ticket for Supervisor at large of Brooklyn but was defeated.

He died at his home on December 29, 1879, at 211, Rutledge Street, Brooklyn, after a "brief but severe illness".
