= New York State Prison Inspector =

The Inspector of State Prisons was a statewide elective office created by the New York State Constitution of 1846. At the 1847 New York state election, three Inspectors were elected and then, upon taking office, so classified that henceforth every year one Inspector would be elected to a three-year term. The Prison Inspectors appointed wardens and keepers and supervised the prison administration in general. They were required to visit jointly four times a year each one of the state prisons. Besides, each one of the Inspectors was allotted the special care to one of the then existing three state prisons (Auburn State Prison, Sing Sing State Prison and Clinton State Prison) where he had to attend to business for at least one week per month.

In 1876, a constitutional amendment abolished the office of State Prison Inspector, pending the appointment of a New York Superintendent of State Prisons who would take over the duties of the Prison Inspectors. The first Superintendent was Louis D. Pilsbury, appointed by Governor Lucius Robinson on February 17, 1877.

== List of Inspectors of State Prisons ==
Name	Took office	Left office	Party	Notes
John B. Gedney	January 1, 1848	December 31, 1848	Whig	drew the one-year term
Isaac N. Comstock	January 1, 1848	December 31, 1849	Whig	drew the two-year term
David D. Spencer	January 1, 1848	December 31, 1850	Whig/Anti-Rent	drew the three-year term
Alexander H. Wells	January 1, 1849	December 31, 1851	Whig	
Darius Clark	January 1, 1850	December 31, 1855	Democratic	two terms; elected on the Democratic and Anti-Rent tickets in 1849, on the Democratic ticket in 1852
William P. Angel	January 1, 1851	December 31, 1853	Democratic/Anti-Rent	
Henry Storms	January 1, 1852	December 31, 1854	Democratic	
Thomas Kirkpatrick	January 1, 1854	December 31, 1856	Whig	
Norwood Bowne	January 1, 1855	December 31, 1857	Whig/Anti-Nebraska/Anti-Rent	
William A. Russell	January 1, 1856	December 31, 1858	American	
Wesley Bailey	January 1, 1857	December 31, 1859	Republican	
William C. Rhodes	January 1, 1858	December 31, 1860	Democratic	
Josiah T. Everest	January 1, 1859	December 31, 1861	Republican	
David P. Forrest	January 1, 1860	December 31, 1862	Republican	
James K. Bates	January 1, 1861	December 31, 1866	Republican	two terms; elected on the Republican ticket in 1860, on the Union ticket in 1863
Abraham B. Tappen	January 1, 1862	December 31, 1864	Union	elected on the Independent People's and Republican tickets
Gaylord J. Clarke	January 1, 1863	December 31, 1865	Democratic	
David P. Forrest	January 1, 1865	December 31, 1867	Union	second term
Henry A. Barnum	January 1, 1866	December 31, 1868	Republican	
John Hammond	January 1, 1867	December 31, 1869	Republican	
Solomon Scheu	January 1, 1868	December 31, 1873	Democratic	two terms
David B. McNeil	January 1, 1869	December 31, 1871	Democratic	
Fordyce L. Laflin	January 1, 1870	December 31, 1872	Democratic	
Thomas Kirkpatrick	January 1, 1872	December 31, 1874	Republican	second term
Ezra Graves	January 1, 1873	December 31, 1875	Republican	
Moss K. Platt	January 1, 1874	March 1, 1876	Republican	died in office
George Wagener	January 1, 1875	February 17, 1877	Democratic	legislated out of office by Amendment of 1876, office taken over by Superintendent of State Prisons
Rodney R. Crowley	January 1, 1876	February 17, 1877	Democratic	legislated out of office by Amendment of 1876, office taken over by Superintendent of State Prisons
Benjamin S. W. Clark	March 2, 1876	December 31, 1876	Democratic	appointed to fill vacancy in place of Platt
Robert H. Anderson	January 1, 1877	February 17, 1877	Democratic	legislated out of office by Amendment of 1876, office taken over by Superintendent of State Prisons
