= George Wagener =

American politician

George Wagener was an American politician from New York.

== Life ==
From 1831 to 1849, he lived on the Bluff Point, the peninsula between the two northern branches of Keuka Lake in Jerusalem, New York. He was Supervisor of the Town of Jerusalem in 1843, and a Justice of the Peace in 1844. He was Sheriff of Yates County from 1850 to 1852, and from 1868 to 1870.

In 1874, he was elected on the Democratic ticket an Inspector of State Prisons, and was in office from January 1875 to February 1877. The office was abolished by a constitutional amendment in 1876, and the three last Inspectors of State Prisons - Wagener, Rodney R. Crowley and Robert H. Anderson - left office upon the appointment of Louis D. Pilsbury as Superintendent of State Prisons.

== Sources ==
- The New York Civil List compiled by Franklin Benjamin Hough (pages 45 and 410; Weed, Parsons and Co., 1858)
- Jerusalem, NY, history, at USGenNet
- List of Sheriffs of Yates County, at official site
