= Daniel Magone =

American lawyer

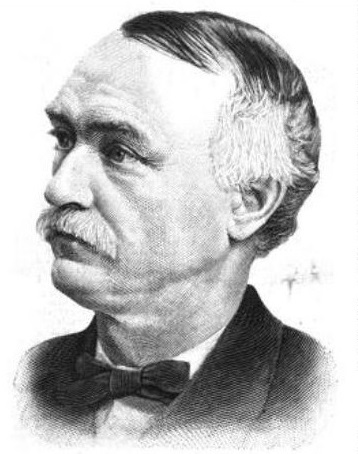
Daniel Magone, New York political figure.

Daniel Magone (January 12, 1827 – September 4, 1904) was an American lawyer who was Collector of the Port of New York during the first administration of United States President Grover Cleveland.

== Early life ==
Magone was born in Oswegatchie, New York into an Irish Catholic family.

== Career ==
Magone became a member of the New York Canal Commission during the governorship of Samuel Tilden, in 1875. The next year he served as chairman of the Democratic Party (United States) state committee. During Tilden's unsuccessful run for the presidency versus Rutherford B. Hayes in 1876, he was a delegate at the Democratic National Convention.

In January 1878, he was nominated by Governor Lucius Robinson to be Superintendent of Public Works but was rejected by the New York State Senate. He was again selected a delegate to the convention which nominated Cleveland in 1884. Cleveland appointed Magone Collector of the Port of New York in 1886.

== Personal life ==
Magone died at his Caroline Street home in Ogdensburg, New York, in 1904. He had been in declining health for some time. He was survived by his wife and a daughter.

Party political offices
Preceded by Allen C. Beach	Chairman of the New York; State Democratic Committee; September 1875–1877	Succeeded by William Purcell
Government offices
Preceded by Edward L. Hedden	Collector of the Port of New York; 1886–1889	Succeeded by Joel Erhardt
