= Lucius Robinson =

American politician (1810–1891)

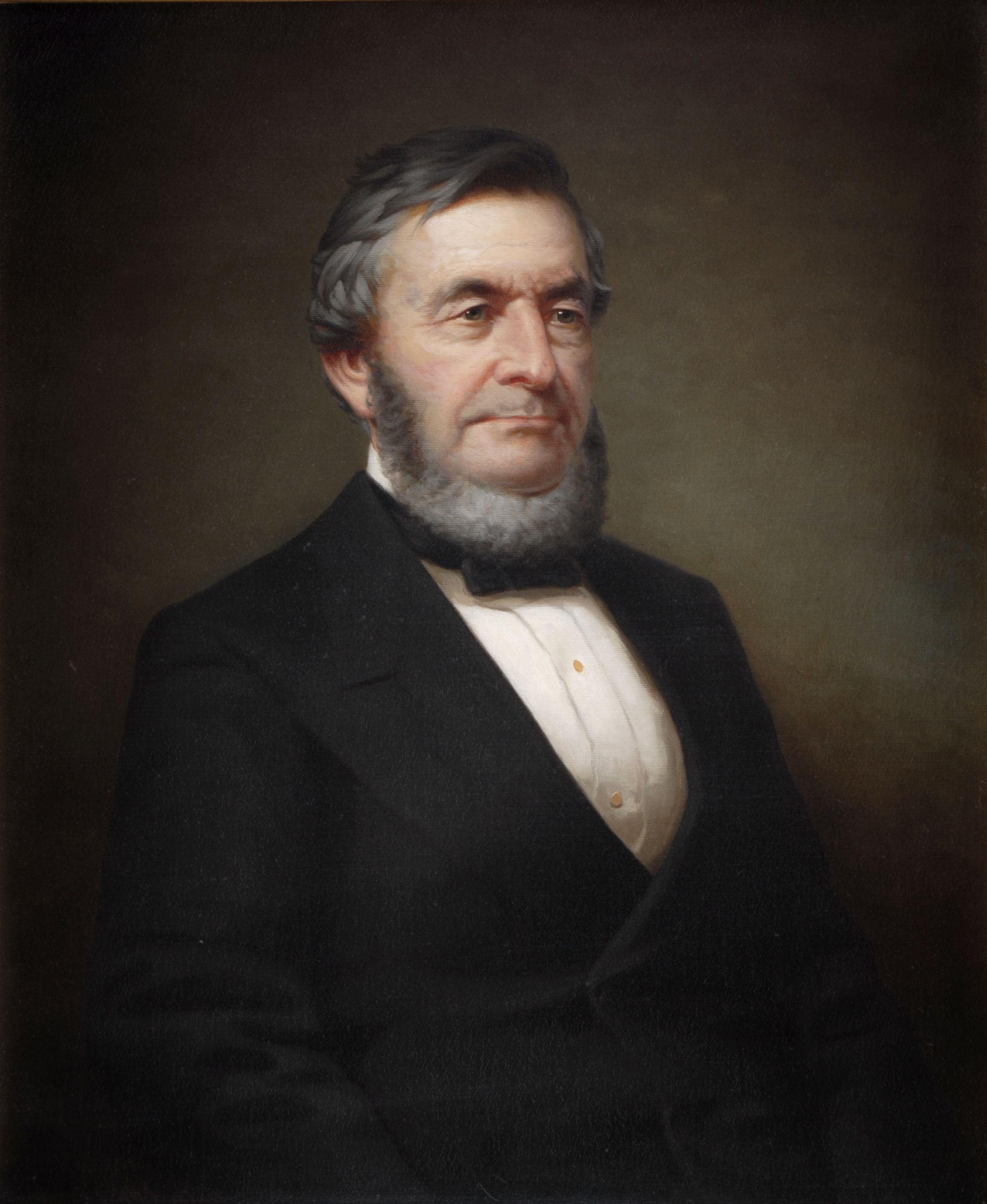
- Gubernatorial portrait of New York Governor Lucius Robinson.

26th Governor of New York
- In office January 1, 1877 – December 31, 1879
- Lieutenant: William Dorsheimer
- Preceded by: Samuel J. Tilden
- Succeeded by: Alonzo B. Cornell

21st New York State Comptroller
- In office January 1, 1862 – December 31, 1865
- Governor: Edwin D. Morgan; Horatio Seymour; Reuben Fenton
- Preceded by: Robert Denniston
- Succeeded by: Thomas Hillhouse
- In office January 1, 1876 – December 31, 1876
- Preceded by: Nelson K. Hopkins
- Succeeded by: Frederic P. Olcott

Member of the New York State Assembly from the Chemung County district
- In office January 1, 1860 – December 31, 1861
- Preceded by: Peter Wintermute
- Succeeded by: Tracy Beadle

Personal details
- Born: November 4, 1810 Windham, New York, U.S.
- Died: March 23, 1891 (aged 80) Elmira, New York, U.S.
- Resting place: Woodlawn Cemetery; Elmira, New York, U.S.
- Party: Democratic
- Spouse: Eunice Osborn (m. 1833)
- Children: 1

Lucius Robinson (November 4, 1810 – March 23, 1891) was an American lawyer and politician. He was the 26th governor of New York from 1877 to 1879.

== Early life ==
Lucius Robinson was born on November 4, 1810, in Windham, New York, to Mary and Eli P. Robinson. His father was a farmer. He was descended from John Robinson, a Puritan clergyman. He graduated from Delaware Academy in Delhi, New York. Afterwards he studied law in the offices of Erastus Root and Amasa J. Parker, and he was admitted to the bar in October 1832.

== Career ==
Robinson began practicing law in Catskill. He was district attorney of Greene County from 1837 to 1839. Then he moved to New York City and became a member of Tammany Hall. In 1843, he was appointed master in chancery and then entered a law partnership with David Codwise. He was reappointed as master in chancery in 1846 by Governor Silas Wright and continued until the Courts of Chancery were abolished by the new constitution. During this time, he was a contributor to the editorial page of The New York Sun. In 1855, he moved to Chemung County. He joined the Republican Party when it was founded, and was a member of the New York State Assembly (Chemung Co.) in 1860 and 1861.

Robinson was New York State Comptroller from 1862 to 1865. In 1861, he was elected on the Union ticket nominated by Republicans and War Democrats. He received a majority of 108,201 votes in the election. In 1863 he was defeated for re-nomination at the Union state convention, but the nominated candidate refused to run, and the Republican State Committee put Robinson back on the ticket, and he was re-elected. After the war he joined the Democratic Party again, and was re-nominated for comptroller on the Democratic ticket, but this time was defeated by the Republican candidate Thomas Hillhouse. After his defeat he resumed the practice of law. In 1871–72 he was a member of the New York State Constitutional Commission.

He was a director of the Erie Railroad, and was acting president of the company while the president, Peter H. Watson, was travelling about Europe. In 1875, he was again elected state comptroller, defeating the Republican candidate, former United States Treasurer Francis E. Spinner. Robinson was a delegate to the 1876 Democratic National Convention and supported Samuel J. Tilden for president. While serving as comptroller, he was elected governor, defeating Edwin D. Morgan by nearly a 40,000 majority. He was in office from 1877 to 1879, the first governor to serve a three-year term after the amendment to the state constitution in 1874. As governor, he opposed Tammany Hall vigorously, which led the Tammany leader John Kelly to have himself nominated for governor by Tammany Hall at the next election in 1879, with the intention to split the Democratic vote, and so defeat Robinson. This happened, and the Republican candidate Alonzo B. Cornell was elected governor with fewer votes than Robinson and Kelly together. He called the new New York State Capitol "the public calamity".

== Personal life ==
Robinson married Eunice Osborn, daughter of Bennet Osborn, on October 24, 1833. They had a son, David C. After retiring as governor, he moved to Elmira.

Robinson died from pneumonia on March 23, 1891, at his home on Maple Avenue in Elmira. He was buried at the Woodlawn Cemetery in Elmira.

== Legacy ==
In 1883, the park commissioners named an entrance to Niagara Falls State Park after Robinson.

Party political offices
Preceded by Samuel J. Tilden	Democratic nominee for Governor of New York; 1876, 1879	Succeeded by Grover Cleveland
New York State Senate
Preceded by Peter Wintermute	New York State Senate; Chemung County; 1860–1861	Succeeded by Tracy Beadle
Political offices
Preceded by Robert Denniston	New York State Comptroller; 1862–1865	Succeeded by Thomas Hillhouse
Preceded by Nelson K. Hopkins	New York State Comptroller; 1876	Succeeded by Frederic P. Olcott
Preceded by Samuel J. Tilden	Governor of New York; 1877–1879	Succeeded by Alonzo B. Cornell
