= 1856–57 United States Senate elections =

- Various dates
- Class 1

21 of the 62 seats in the United States Senate (with special elections) 32 seats needed for a majority
	Majority party	Minority party	Third party
Party	Democratic	Republican	Whig
Last election	33 seats	3 seats	20 seats
Seats before	37	11	8
Seats won	9	10	0
Seats after	34	18	3
Seat change	▼3	▲7	▼5
Seats up	12	3	5
	Fourth party	Fifth party
Party	American	Free Soil
Last election	1 seat	2 seats
Seats before	1	2
Seats won	1	0
Seats after	2	1
Seat change	▲1	▼1
Seats up	0	1
- Results of the elections: Democratic gain Democratic hold Republican gain Republican hold American Gain Legislature failed to elect
Majority Party before election
Democratic
Elected Majority Party
Democratic

The 1856–57 United States Senate elections were held on various dates in various states. As these U.S. Senate elections were prior to the ratification of the Seventeenth Amendment in 1913, senators were chosen by state legislatures. Senators were elected over a wide range of time throughout 1856 and 1857, and a seat may have been filled months late or remained vacant due to legislative deadlock. In these elections, terms were up for the senators in Class 1.

The young Republican Party assumed its position as one of the United States's two main political parties. The Whigs and Free Soilers were gone by the time the next Congress began.

== Results summary ==
Senate party division, 35th Congress (1857–1859)

- Majority party: Democratic (37–42)
- Minority party: Republican (20)
- Other party: American (4)
- Vacant: 1–0
- Total seats: 62–66

== Change in composition ==
=== Before the elections ===
After the January 14, 1856 special election in Pennsylvania.

D_{1}									
D_{2}	D_{3}	D_{4}	D_{5}	D_{6}	D_{7}	D_{8}	D_{9}	D_{10}	D_{11}
D_{21}	D_{20}	D_{19}	D_{18}	D_{17}	D_{16}	D_{15}	D_{14}	D_{13}	D_{12}
D_{22}	D_{23}	D_{24}	D_{25}	D_{26} Ran	D_{27} Ran	D_{28} Ran	D_{29} Ran	D_{30} Ran	D_{31} Ran
Majority →									D_{32} Ran
A_{1}	V_{1}	V_{2}	V_{3}	D_{37} Retired	D_{36} Retired	D_{35} Unknown	D_{34} Unknown	D_{33} Unknown	D_{32} Ran
FS_{2} Ran	FS_{1}	R_{11} Unknown	R_{10} Ran	R_{9} Ran	R_{8}	R_{7}	R_{6}	R_{5}	R_{4}
W_{2}	W_{3}	W_{4} Unknown	W_{5} Retired	W_{6} Retired	W_{7} Retired	W_{8} Retired	R_{1}	R_{2}	R_{3}
W_{1}									

=== As a result of the elections ===
D_{1}									
D_{2}	D_{3}	D_{4}	D_{5}	D_{6}	D_{7}	D_{8}	D_{9}	D_{10}	D_{11}
D_{21}	D_{20}	D_{19}	D_{18}	D_{17}	D_{16}	D_{15}	D_{14}	D_{13}	D_{12}
D_{22}	D_{23}	D_{24}	D_{25}	D_{26} Re-elected	D_{27} Re-elected	D_{28} Re-elected	D_{29} Re-elected	D_{30} Re-elected	D_{31} Re-elected
Majority →									D_{32} Hold
FS_{1}	A_{1}	A_{2} Gain	V_{1} W Loss	V_{2}	V_{3}	V_{4}	D_{34} Gain	D_{33} Hold	D_{32} Hold
R_{18} Gain	R_{17} Re-elected; Diff. party	R_{16} Hold	R_{15} Re-elected	R_{14} Re-elected	R_{13}	R_{12}	R_{11}	R_{10}	R_{9}
W_{2}	W_{3}	R_{1} Gain	R_{2} Gain	R_{3} Gain	R_{4} Gain	R_{5} Gain	R_{6}	R_{7}	R_{8}
W_{1}									

=== Beginning of the next Congress ===
D_{1}									
D_{2}	D_{3}	D_{4}	D_{5}	D_{6}	D_{7}	D_{8}	D_{9}	D_{10}	D_{11}
D_{21}	D_{20}	D_{19}	D_{18}	D_{17}	D_{16}	D_{15}	D_{14}	D_{13}	D_{12}
D_{22}	D_{23}	D_{24}	D_{25}	D_{26}	D_{27}	D_{28}	D_{29}	D_{30}	D_{31}
Majority →									D_{32}
A_{2}	A_{3} Changed	A_{4} Changed	V_{1}	D_{37} Gain	D_{36} Gain	D_{35} Gain	D_{34} Changed	D_{33} Changed	D_{32}
A_{1}	R_{20}	R_{19}	R_{18}	R_{17}	R_{16}	R_{15}	R_{14}	R_{13}	R_{12}
R_{2} Changed	R_{3} Changed	R_{4}	R_{5}	R_{6}	R_{7}	R_{8}	R_{9}	R_{10}	R_{11}
R_{1} Changed									

Key:

D_{#}	Democratic
FS_{#}	Free Soil
A_{#}	American
R_{#}	Republican
W_{#}	Whig
V_{#}	Vacant

== Race summaries ==
=== Elections during the 34th Congress ===
In these elections, the winners were seated during 1856 or in 1857 before March 4; ordered by election date.

State	Incumbent			Results	Candidates
State	Senator	Party	Electoral history	Results	Candidates
Pennsylvania (Class 3)	Vacant			Legislature had failed to elect. New senator elected January 14, 1856. Democratic gain.	▌ ✓ William Bigler (Democratic) 61.65%; ▌Edward Joy Morris (Republican) 32.33%; ▌John C. Flenniken (Unknown) 0.75%
Missouri (Class 3)	Vacant			Legislature had failed to elect. New senator elected January 12, 1857. Democratic gain.	▌ ✓ James S. Green (Democratic); [data missing]
California (Class 3)	Vacant			Legislature had failed to elect. Incumbent was then elected January 13, 1857. Democratic gain.	▌ ✓ William M. Gwin (Democratic); [data missing]
Delaware (Class 2)	Joseph P. Comegys	Whig	1856 (appointed)	Interim appointee retired. New senator elected January 14, 1857. Democratic gain.	▌ ✓ Martin W. Bates (Democratic); [data missing]
Maine (Class 1)	Hannibal Hamlin Sr.	Republican	1848 (sp.); 1851; 1857 (r.)	Incumbent resigned to become Governor of Maine. Republican hold. Winner was not elected to the next term, see below.	First ballot (January 16, 1857): ▌ ✓ Amos Nourse (Republican) 118 H; 28 S; ▌Nathaniel Clifford III (Democratic) 21 H; 0 S; ▌George Evans Sr. (Whig) 3 H; 0 S; ▌Nathan Griffin Hichborn (Republican) 0 H; 1 S; ▌ Absent 11 H; 0 S
Iowa (Class 3)	James Harlan	Free Soil	1855	Election invalidated January 5, 1857. Incumbent re-elected January 29, 1857 as a Republican. Republican gain.	▌ ✓ James Harlan (Republican); [data missing]
Indiana (Class 3)	Vacant			Legislature had failed to elect. New senator elected February 4, 1857. Democratic gain.	▌ ✓ Graham N. Fitch (Democratic); [data missing]

=== Races leading to the 35th Congress ===
In these general elections, the winners were elected for the term beginning March 4, 1857; ordered by state.

All of the elections involved the Class 1 seats.

State	Incumbent			Results	Candidates
State	Senator	Party	Electoral history	Results	Candidates
California	John B. Weller	Democratic	1852 (special)	Incumbent lost re-election. Winner elected in 1856. Democratic hold.	▌ ✓ David C. Broderick (Democratic); [data missing]
Connecticut	Isaac Toucey	Democratic	1852	Incumbent retired. New senator elected in 1856. Republican gain.	▌ ✓ James Dixon (Republican); [data missing]
Delaware	James A. Bayard Jr.	Democratic	1851	Incumbent re-elected in 1857.	▌ ✓ James A. Bayard Jr. (Democratic); [data missing]
Florida	Stephen Mallory	Democratic	1851	Incumbent re-elected in 1857.	▌ ✓ Stephen Mallory (Democratic); [data missing]
Indiana	Jesse D. Bright	Democratic	1844; 1850	Incumbent re-elected in 1856.	▌ ✓ Jesse D. Bright (Democratic); [data missing]
Maine	Amos Nourse	Republican	1857 (sp.)	Incumbent retired. Republican hold.	First ballot (January 16, 1857): ▌ ✓ Hannibal Hamlin Sr. (Republican) 115 H; 28 S; ▌Nathaniel Clifford III (Democratic) 21 H; 1 S; ▌David Bronson III (Whig) 3 H; 0 S; ▌Lot Myrick Morrill (Republican) 1 H; 0 S; ▌Absent 1 H; 0 S
Maryland	Thomas Pratt	Whig	1850 (special); 1851	Incumbent lost re-election or retired. New senator elected in 1856 or 1857. American gain.	▌ ✓ Anthony Kennedy (American); [data missing]
Massachusetts	Charles Sumner	Free Soil	1851 (special)	Incumbent re-elected in 1857 as a Republican. Republican gain.	▌ ✓ Charles Sumner (Republican); [data missing]
Michigan	Lewis Cass	Democratic	1844 or 1845; 1848 (resigned); 1849 (special)	Incumbent lost re-election or retired. New senator elected in January 1857. Republican gain.	▌ ✓ Zachariah Chandler (Republican); [data missing]
Mississippi	Stephen Adams	Democratic	1852 (special)	Incumbent lost re-election or retired. New senator elected in 1856 or 1857. Democratic hold.	▌ ✓ Jefferson Davis (Democratic); [data missing]
Missouri	Henry S. Geyer	Whig	1851	Incumbent retired. New senator elected in 1857. Democratic gain.	▌ ✓ Trusten Polk (Democratic); [data missing]
New Jersey	John Renshaw Thomson	Democratic	1853 (special)	Incumbent re-elected in 1857.	▌ ✓ John Renshaw Thomson (Democratic) 50; ▌Joseph Fitz Randolph (Opposition) 22; ▌Richard Stockton Field (Opposition) 6; [data missing]
New York	Hamilton Fish	Whig	1851	Incumbent retired. New senator elected February 3, 1857. Republican gain.	▌ ✓ Preston King (Republican) 91; ▌Daniel E. Sickles (Democratic) 34; ▌Joel T. Headley (American) 15
Ohio	Benjamin Wade	Republican	1851	Incumbent re-elected in 1856.	▌ ✓ Benjamin Wade (Republican); [data missing]
Pennsylvania	Richard Brodhead	Democratic	1851	Incumbent lost re-election or retired. New senator elected January 13, 1857. Republican gain.	▌ ✓ Simon Cameron (Republican) 50.38%; ▌John W. Forney (Democratic) 43.61%; ▌Henry D. Foster (Democratic) 5.26%; ▌William Wilkins (Democratic) 0.75%
Rhode Island	Charles T. James	Democratic	1850 or 1851	Incumbent retired. New senator elected in 1856. Republican gain.	▌ ✓ James F. Simmons (Republican); [data missing]
Tennessee	James C. Jones	Whig	1851	Incumbent retired. Legislature failed to elect. Whig loss. Seat would remain vacant until October 8, 1857; see below.	[data missing]
Texas	Thomas J. Rusk	Democratic	1846; 1851	Incumbent re-elected in 1857.	▌ ✓ Thomas J. Rusk (Democratic); [data missing]
Vermont	Solomon Foot	Republican	1850	Incumbent re-elected in 1856.	▌ ✓ Solomon Foot (Republican); [data missing]
Virginia	James M. Mason	Democratic	1847 (special); 1850	Incumbent re-elected in 1856.	▌ ✓ James M. Mason (Democratic); [data missing]
Wisconsin	Henry Dodge	Democratic	1848; 1851	Incumbent retired. New senator elected January 23, 1857. Republican gain.	▌ ✓ James R. Doolittle (Republican) 67.52%; ▌ Charles Dunn (Democratic) 30.77%; ▌ David Taylor (Republican) 0.85%; "Jack Frost" 0.85%

=== Elections during the 35th Congress ===
In these elections, the winners were elected in 1857 after March 4; ordered by election date.

State	Incumbent			Results	Candidates
State	Senator	Party	Electoral history	Results	Candidates
New Hampshire (Class 3)	James Bell	Republican	1855	Incumbent died May 25, 1857. New senator elected June 27, 1857. Republican hold.	▌ ✓ Daniel Clark (Republican); [data missing]
Tennessee (Class 1)	Vacant			Legislature had failed to elect. New senator elected October 8, 1857. Democratic gain.	▌ ✓ Andrew Johnson (Democratic); [data missing]
South Carolina (Class 3)	Andrew Butler	Democratic	1846 (appointed) ? (special); 1848; 1854	Incumbent died May 25, 1857. New senator elected December 7, 1857. Democratic hold.	▌ ✓ James H. Hammond (Democratic); [data missing]

== Complete list of states ==
=== Maryland ===
1857 United States Senate election in Maryland
- 1857

80 members of the Maryland General Assembly
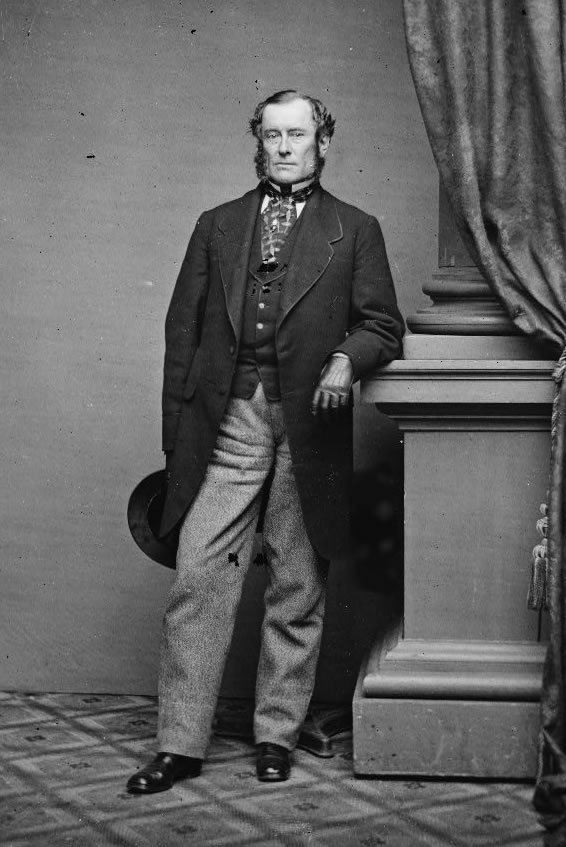
Candidate	Anthony Kennedy
Party	Whig
Legislative vote	-
Percentage	-%

Anthony Kennedy won election by an unknown margin of votes, for the Class 1 seat. Kennedy took office on March 4, 1857, succeeding Thomas G. Pratt. At the time, Kennedy was affiliated with the American Party (Know Nothing), reflecting the party's influence in Maryland politics during the mid-1850s.

=== New York ===
The New York election was held February 3, 1857, by the New York State Legislature. Whig Hamilton Fish had been elected in 1851 to this seat, and his term would expire on March 3, 1857.

In 1855, the Whig Party and the Anti-Nebraska Party merged in New York to form the Republican Party.

At the State election in November 1855, 16 Republicans, 11 Americans, 4 Democrats and 1 Temperance man were elected for a two-year term (1856–1857) in the State Senate. At the State election in November 1856, 81 Republicans, 31 Democrats and 8 Americans were elected to the Assembly for the session of 1857. The 80th New York State Legislature met from January 6 to April 18, 1857, at Albany, New York.

Preston King was nominated by a caucus of Republican State legislators. King had been a Democratic congressman from 1843 to 1847, a Free Soil congressman from 1849 to 1853, and had joined the Republican Party upon its foundation at the State convention in September 1855. The convention nominated King for Secretary of State, but he was defeated by Joel T. Headley in a four-way race. Secretary of State Joel T. Headley was the candidate of the American Party. State Senator Daniel E. Sickles was the candidate of the Democratic Party.

In the Assembly the vote confirmed the party caucus selections. When State Senator Sickles received votes, the same objection to his eligibility was raised as was in 1833 regarding Nathaniel P. Tallmadge. This time, Speaker DeWitt C. Littlejohn ruled that the objection was "partially tenable and partially not so." However, the Speaker held that any member could vote for anybody, and only if the candidate received sufficient votes to win the election, a decision would be required. Otherwise, like in this case, the eligibility of an also-ran was irrelevant.

In the State Senate, only 24 votes were given. Zenas Clark (Rep.) and John B. Halsted (Rep.) were sick at home. Eaton J. Richardson (Rep.) paired with Sidney Sweet (Am.). Joseph H. Petty (Am.) was absent. William Kelly (Dem.), Mark Spencer (Dem.), and the Democratic candidate Sickles himself, declined to vote.

State Senator Justin A. Smith (Am.) raised the question if the vote for Sickles could be counted. A new State Constitution had been adopted in 1846, which had clarified the question of eligibility of State legislators. Smith quoted from the State Constitution: "No member of the Legislature shall receive any civil appointment within this State, or to the Senate of the United States, from the Governor, the Governor and Senate, or from the Legislature, during the term for which he shall have been elected; and all votes given for any such member, for any such office or appointment, shall be void." Lt. Gov. Henry R. Selden (later a judge of the New York Court of Appeals) decided to count the vote, holding that the United States Constitution described the eligibility for the office and devolved on the State legislatures only the power to prescribe the "times, places and manners of holding the elections for that office", thus not implying a right for the State governments to exclude any person who would be eligible under the U.S. Constitution.

Preston King was the choice of both the Assembly and the Senate, and was declared elected.

House	Republican		Democrat		American	
State Senate (32 members)	Preston King	14	Daniel E. Sickles	1	Joel T. Headley	9
State Assembly (128 members)	Preston King	77	Daniel E. Sickles	33	Joel T. Headley	6

=== Pennsylvania ===
==== Pennsylvania (special) ====
The Class 3 election was held on January 14, 1856. William Bigler was elected by the Pennsylvania General Assembly to the United States Senate.

The Pennsylvania General Assembly had previously convened on February 13, 1855, for the regularly scheduled Senate election for the term beginning on March 4, 1855. Two ballots were recorded on February 13, followed by three on February 27, 1855. On the fifth and final ballot during this convention, former Senator Simon Cameron had led with 55 votes to future Senator Charles R. Buckalew's 23. No candidate was elected, however, and the hung election convention adjourned by a vote of 66 to 65. Upon the expiration of incumbent James Cooper's term on March 4, 1855, the seat was vacated and would remain vacant until William Bigler's election in January 1856.

On January 14, 1856, the election convention of the General Assembly re-convened and elected Democratic former Governor of Pennsylvania William Bigler on the first ballot to serve the remainder of the term that began on March 4, 1855, and would expire on March 4, 1861. The results of the vote of both houses combined are as follows:

State legislature results
Party	Candidate	Votes	%
Democratic	William Bigler	82	61.65
Republican	Edward Joy Morris	43	32.33
Unknown	John C. Flenniken	1	0.75
N/A	Not voting	7	5.26
Totals		133	100.00%

==== Pennsylvania (regular) ====
The Class 1 election in Pennsylvania was held on January 13, 1857. Simon Cameron was elected by the Pennsylvania General Assembly to the United States Senate.

The Pennsylvania General Assembly convened on January 13, 1857, to elect a Senator to serve the term beginning on March 4, 1857. The results of the vote of both houses combined are as follows:

State legislature results
Party	Candidate	Votes	%
Republican	Simon Cameron	67	50.38
Democratic	John W. Forney	58	43.61
Democratic	Henry D. Foster	7	5.26
Democratic	William Wilkins	1	0.75
Totals		133	100.00%

== See also ==
- 1856 United States elections
  - 1856 United States presidential election
  - 1856–57 United States House of Representatives elections
- 34th United States Congress
- 35th United States Congress
