= 1857 United States Senate election in New York =

- February 3, 1857

Majority vote of each house needed to win
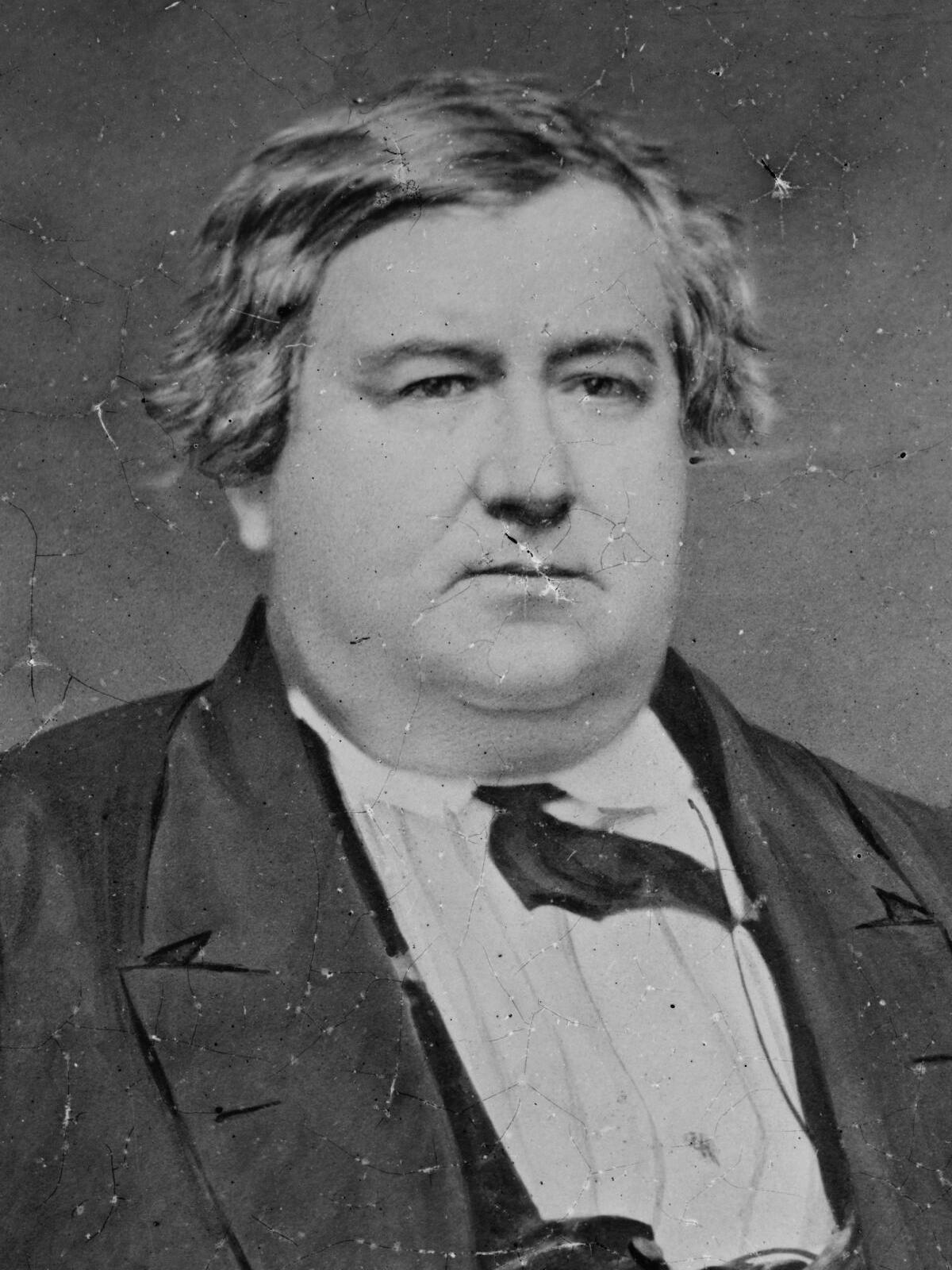

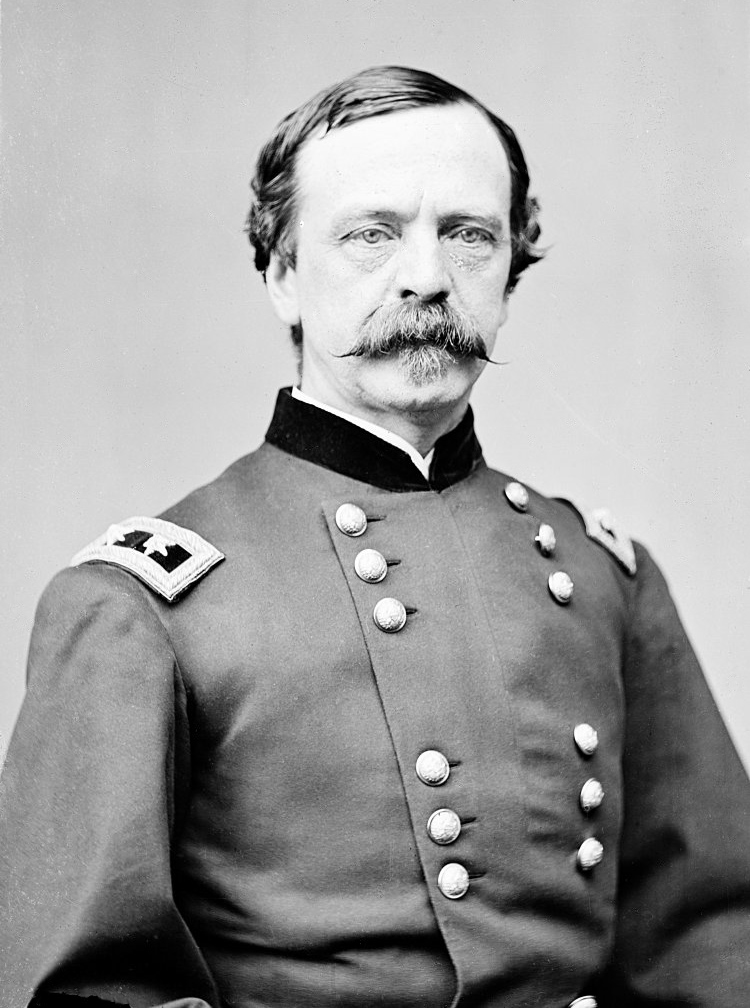

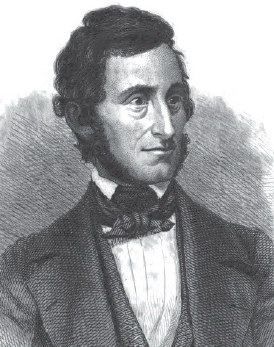
Nominee	Preston King	Daniel E. Sickles	Joel T. Headley
Party	Republican	Democratic	Know Nothing
Senate	14	1	9
Percentage	58.33%	4.17%	37.50%
House	77	33	6
Percentage	66.38%	28.45%	5.17%
Senator before election
Hamilton Fish
Whig
Elected Senator
Preston King
Republican

The 1857 United States Senate election in New York was held on February 3, 1857, by the New York State Legislature. Incumbent Whig Senator Hamilton Fish did not stand for re-election. The seat was won by Preston King, a former U.S. representative and member of the newly formed Republican Party. King was the first Republican elected to represent New York, although William H. Seward had joined the party after being elected as a Whig in 1855.

== Background ==
Whig Hamilton Fish had been elected in 1851 to this seat, and his term would expire on March 3, 1857.

In 1855, the Whig Party and the Anti-Nebraska Party merged in New York to form the Republican Party.

At the State election in November 1855, 16 Republicans, 11 Americans, 4 Democrats and 1 Temperance man were elected for a two-year term (1856–1857) in the State Senate. At the State election in November 1856, 81 Republicans, 31 Democrats and 8 Americans were elected to the Assembly for the session of 1857. The 80th New York State Legislature met from January 6 to April 18, 1857, at Albany, New York.

== Candidates ==
Preston King was nominated by a caucus of Republican State legislators. King had been a Democratic congressman from 1843 to 1847, a Free Soil congressman from 1849 to 1853, and had joined the Republican Party upon its foundation at the State convention in September 1855. The convention nominated King for Secretary of State, but he was defeated by Joel T. Headley in a four-way race.

Secretary of State Joel T. Headley was the candidate of the American Party.

State Senator Daniel E. Sickles was the candidate of the Democratic Party.

== Election ==
In the Assembly the vote confirmed the party caucus selections. When State Senator Sickles received votes, the same objection to his eligibility was raised as was in 1833 regarding Nathaniel P. Tallmadge. This time, Speaker DeWitt C. Littlejohn ruled that the objection was "partially tenable and partially not so." However, the Speaker held that any member could vote for anybody, and only if the candidate received sufficient votes to win the election, a decision would be required. Otherwise, like in this case, the eligibility of an also-ran was irrelevant.

In the State Senate, only 24 votes were given. Zenas Clark (Rep.) and John B. Halsted (Rep.) were sick at home. Eaton J. Richardson (Rep.) paired with Sidney Sweet (Am.). Joseph H. Petty (Am.) was absent. William Kelly (Dem.), Mark Spencer (Dem.), and the Democratic candidate Sickles himself, declined to vote.

State Senator Justin A. Smith (Am.) raised the question if the vote for Sickles could be counted. A new State Constitution had been adopted in 1846, which had clarified the question of eligibility of State legislators. Smith quoted from the State Constitution: "No member of the Legislature shall receive any civil appointment within this State, or to the Senate of the United States, from the Governor, the Governor and Senate, or from the Legislature, during the term for which he shall have been elected; and all votes given for any such member, for any such office or appointment, shall be void." Lt. Gov. Henry R. Selden (later a judge of the New York Court of Appeals) decided to count the vote, holding that the United States Constitution described the eligibility for the office and devolved on the State legislatures only the power to prescribe the "times, places and manners of holding the elections for that office", thus not implying a right for the State governments to exclude any person who would be eligible under the U.S. Constitution.

== Result ==
Preston King was the choice of both the Assembly and the Senate, and was declared elected.

1857 United States Senator election result
Office	House	Republican		Democrat		American	
U.S. Senator	State Senate (32 members)	Preston King	14	Daniel E. Sickles	1	Joel T. Headley	9
	State Assembly (128 members)	Preston King	77	Daniel E. Sickles	33	Joel T. Headley	6

== Aftermath ==
King served one term, and remained in office until March 3, 1863.

== See also ==
- United States Senate elections, 1856 and 1857

== Sources ==
- The New York Civil List compiled in 1858 (see: pg. 63 for U.S. Senators [gives wrong date "February 6"]; pg. 137 for State Senators 1857; pg. 252ff for Members of Assembly 1857)
- STATE AFFAIRS.; The Election of Preston King as United States Senator in NYT on February 4, 1857
- Result Senate: Journal of the Senate (80th Session) (1857; pg. 171)
- Result Assembly: Journal of the Assembly (80th Session) (1857; pg. 245f)
