= 80th New York State Legislature =

New York state legislative session

←	79th	81st	→
- The Old State Capitol (1879)

Overview
- Legislative body: New York State Legislature
- Jurisdiction: New York, United States
- Term: January 1 – December 31, 1857

Senate
- Members: 32
- President: Lt. Gov. Henry R. Selden (R)
- Temporary President: Mark Spencer (D), from January 24
- Party control: Republican (17-9-4)

Assembly
- Members: 128
- Speaker: DeWitt C. Littlejohn (R)
- Party control: Republican (81-38-8)

Sessions
- 1st: January 6 – April 18, 1857

The 80th New York State Legislature, consisting of the New York State Senate and the New York State Assembly, met from January 6 to April 18, 1857, during the first year of John A. King's governorship, in Albany.

== Background ==
Under the provisions of the New York Constitution of 1846, 32 Senators were elected in single-seat senatorial districts for a two-year term, the whole Senate being renewed biennially. The senatorial districts (except those in New York City) were made up of entire counties. 128 Assemblymen were elected in single-seat districts to a one-year term, the whole Assembly being renewed annually.

The Assembly districts were made up of entire towns, or city wards, forming a contiguous area, all in the same county. The City and County of New York was divided into four senatorial districts, and 16 Assembly districts.

At this time there were two major political parties: the Democratic Party and the Republican Party. The Know Nothing movement ran in the election as the "American Party."

== Elections ==
The 1856 New York state election was held on November 4. Republicans John A. King and Henry R. Selden were elected Governor and Lieutenant Governor. The other three statewide elective offices were also carried by the Republicans. The approximate party strength at this election, as expressed by the vote on Governor was: Republican 265,000; Democratic 198,000; and American 130,000.

== Sessions ==
The Legislature met for the regular session at the Old State Capitol in Albany on January 6, 1857; and adjourned on April 18.

DeWitt C. Littlejohn (R) was again elected Speaker with 79 votes against 35 for David R. Floyd-Jones (D), and 7 for Joseph B. Varnum Jr. (A). William Richardson (R) was elected Clerk of the Assembly with 78 votes against 37 for John S. Nafew (D) and 7 for G. M. Stevens (A).

On January 24, Mark Spencer (D) was elected president pro tempore of the State Senate.

On February 3, the Legislature elected Preston King (R) to succeed Hamilton Fish as U.S. Senator from New York for a six-year term beginning on March 4, 1857.

On April 7, the Legislature elected Henry H. Van Dyck (R) to succeed Victor M. Rice as State Superintendent of Public Instruction.

On April 13, the Legislature re-apportioned the Senate districts, and the Assembly seats per county. Cayuga, Dutchess, Genesee, Greene, Montgomery, Onondaga, Orange, Otsego, Schoharie and Tompkins counties lost one seat each; New York, Oswego, Queens, Ulster and Westchester counties gained one seat each; Kings County gained four seats; and the new Schuyler County was apportioned one seat.

On April 15, the Legislature passed "An Act to establish a Metropolitan Police District, and to provide for the government thereof." This act re-organized, and unified, the police forces in New York City, Staten Island, Kings County and Westchester County. The Metropolitan Police was headed by a Board consisting of five Commissioners (appointed by the Governor, and confirmed by the Senate) and the Mayors of New York City and Brooklyn. At first, Mayor Fernando Wood did not recognize the Metropoplitan Police, and refused to disband the Municipal Police. The struggle led to the New York City Police Riot, but after the New York Court of Appeals upheld the Legislature's police law, Mayor Wood quietly agreed to abide by it.

== State Senate ==
=== Districts ===
- 1st District: Queens, Richmond and Suffolk counties
- 2nd District: Kings County
- 3rd District: 1st, 2nd, 3rd, 4th, 5th and 6th wards of New York City
- 4th District: 7th, 10th, 13th and 17th wards of New York City
- 5th District: 8th, 9th and 14th wards of New York City
- 6th District: 11th, 12th, 15th, 16th, 18th, 19th, 20th, 21st and 22nd wards of New York City
- 7th District: Putnam, Rockland and Westchester counties
- 8th District: Columbia and Dutchess counties
- 9th District: Orange and Sullivan counties
- 10th District: Greene and Ulster counties
- 11th District: Albany and Schenectady counties
- 12th District: Rensselaer County
- 13th District: Saratoga and Washington counties
- 14th District: Clinton, Essex and Warren counties
- 15th District: Franklin and St. Lawrence counties
- 16th District: Fulton, Hamilton, Herkimer and Montgomery counties
- 17th District: Delaware and Schoharie counties
- 18th District: Chenango and Otsego counties
- 19th District: Oneida County
- 20th District: Madison and Oswego counties
- 21st District: Jefferson and Lewis counties
- 22nd District: Onondaga County
- 23rd District: Broome, Cortland and Tioga counties
- 24th District: Cayuga and Wayne counties
- 25th District: Seneca, Tompkins and Yates counties
- 26th District: Chemung and Steuben counties
- 27th District: Monroe County
- 28th District: Genesee, Niagara and Orleans counties
- 29th District: Livingston and Ontario counties
- 30th District: Allegany and Wyoming counties
- 31st District: Erie County
- 32nd District: Cattaraugus and Chautauqua counties
Note: There are now 62 counties in the State of New York. The counties which are not mentioned in this list had not yet been established, or sufficiently organized, the area being included in one or more of the abovementioned counties.

=== Members ===
The asterisk (*) denotes members of the previous Legislature who continued in office as members of this Legislature.

Party affiliations follow the vote on U.S. Senator and Regent of the University.

District	Senator	Party	Notes
1st	James Rider*	Republican	
2nd	Cyrus P. Smith*	Republican	
3rd	Daniel E. Sickles*	Democrat	unsuccessfully contested by Thomas J. Barr (D); on November 4, 1856, elected to the 35th U.S. Congress
4th	Joseph H. Petty*	American	
5th	Mark Spencer*	Democrat	on January 24, elected president pro tempore
6th	Erastus Brooks*	American	
7th	John W. Ferdon*	American	
8th	William Kelly*	Democrat	
9th	Edward M. Madden*	Republican	
10th	George S. Nichols*	American	
11th	John W. Harcourt*	American	
12th	Amos Briggs*	American	
13th	Justin A. Smith*	American	
14th	William Hotchkiss*	American	
15th	Zenas Clark*	Republican	resigned, due to ill health, on February 13
15th	Bloomfield Usher	Republican	elected to fill vacancy, seated on March 12
16th	Frederick P. Bellinger*	Republican	
17th	Joseph H. Ramsey*	Republican	
18th	Addison M. Smith*	American	
19th	Eaton J. Richardson*	Republican	
20th	M. Lindley Lee*	Republican	
21st	Gardner Towne*	Republican	
22nd	James Noxon*	Republican	
23rd	George W. Bradford*	Republican	
24th	Samuel C. Cuyler*	Republican	
25th	James Huntington*	Republican	
26th	John K. Hale*	American	
27th	John E. Paterson*	Republican	
28th	Alonzo S. Upham*	Republican	
29th	Sidney Sweet*	American	
30th	John B. Halsted*	Republican	
31st	James Wadsworth*	Democrat	
32nd	John P. Darling	Republican	elected to fill vacancy, in place of Roderick White

=== Employees ===
- Clerk: Samuel P. Allen
- Sergeant-at-Arms: Samuel R. Tuell
- Assistant Sergeant-at-Arms: George W. Bedell
- Doorkeeper: William Coppernall
- Assistant Doorkeeper: Henry W. Shipman
- Second Assistant Doorkeeper: Victor M. Dearborn

== State Assembly ==
=== Assemblymen ===
The asterisk (*) denotes members of the previous Legislature who continued as members of this Legislature. Richard U. Sherman, the Clerk of the Assembly during the previous Session, was elected a member.

Party affiliations follow the vote for Speaker.

District		Assemblymen	Party	Notes
Albany	1st	Richard Kimmey	Democrat	
Albany	2nd	Adam Van Allen	Republican	
Albany	3rd	John Evers	Democrat	took his seat on February 25
Albany	4th	Franklin Townsend	Democrat	
Allegany	1st	William M. Smith	Republican	
Allegany	2nd	James T. Cameron	Republican	
Broome		Enos Puffer	Republican	
Cattaraugus	1st	Alanson King	Republican	
Cattaraugus	2nd	Rufus Crowley	Republican	
Cayuga	1st	James J. Owen	Republican	
Cayuga	2nd	Theodore M. Pomeroy	Republican	
Cayuga	3rd	Hiram Tifft	Republican	
Chautauqua	1st	Henry A. Prendergast*	Republican	
Chautauqua	2nd	Isaac George	Republican	
Chemung		William T. Hastings	Republican	
Chenango	1st	Ansel Berry	Republican	
Chenango	2nd	William H. Hyde	Republican	
Clinton		Horace P. Perry	Republican	
Columbia	1st	John Miller	Democrat	
Columbia	2nd	John T. Hogeboom	Republican	
Cortland		Joseph Atwater	Republican	
Delaware	1st	Barna R. Johnson	Republican	
Delaware	2nd	Warren Dimmick	American	
Dutchess	1st	John H. Ketcham*	Republican	
Dutchess	2nd	Franklin Dudley	Republican	
Dutchess	3rd	Cornelius N. Campbell	Democrat	
Erie	1st	Augustus J. Tiffany	Republican	
Erie	2nd	George De Witt Clinton	Democrat	
Erie	3rd	Horace Boies	Republican	
Erie	4th	S. Carey Adams	Republican	
Essex		Ralph A. Loveland	Republican	
Franklin		George Mott	Democrat	
Fulton and Hamilton		Patrick McFarlan	Democrat	
Genesee	1st	Seth Wakeman*	Republican	
Genesee	2nd	John J. McPherson	Republican	
Greene	1st	David Whiting	Democrat	
Greene	2nd	Hezekiah Baldwin	Republican	
Herkimer	1st	John H. Wooster	Republican	
Herkimer	2nd	Harris Lewis	Republican	
Jefferson	1st	Calvin Littlefield	Republican	
Jefferson	2nd	Cleanthus P. Granger	Republican	
Jefferson	3rd	Abner W. Peck	Republican	
Kings	1st	John Hanford*	Democrat	
Kings	2nd	Thomas Mulligan	Democrat	
Kings	3rd	John H. Funk	Democrat	
Lewis		Lucian Clark	Republican	
Livingston	1st	Lyman Hawes	Republican	
Livingston	2nd	Alfred Bell	Republican	
Madison	1st	Albert G. Purdy	Republican	
Madison	2nd	Thomas P. Bishop	Republican	
Monroe	1st	Jeremiah S. Baker	Republican	
Monroe	2nd	John T. Lacey	Republican	
Monroe	3rd	Robert Staples	Republican	
Montgomery	1st	Matthew O. Davis	Republican	
Montgomery	2nd	Hezekiah Baker	Republican	
New York	1st	Daniel Mahen*	Democrat	
New York	2nd	Thomas Kivlen	Democrat	
New York	3rd	Andrew Sheehan	Democrat	
New York	4th	John D. Dixon*	Democrat	
New York	5th	John J. Reilly*	Democrat	
New York	6th	Nathaniel Roe	Democrat	
New York	7th	Henry J. Irving	American	
New York	8th	Thomas Charlock	Democrat	
New York	9th	Erastus W. Glover*	Democrat	
New York	10th	James S. Sluyter	Democrat	
New York	11th	James J. Reilly	Democrat	
New York	12th	Nicholas W. Mooney	Democrat	
New York	13th	Joseph B. Varnum Jr.	American	
New York	14th	Robert B. Bradford	Democrat	
New York	15th	Arthur Woods*	Democrat	
New York	16th	Samuel T. Roberts	Democrat	
Niagara	1st	Elisha Clapp	Republican	
Niagara	2nd	John Gould*	Republican	
Oneida	1st	Richard U. Sherman	Republican	
Oneida	2nd	Peleg B. Babcock	Republican	died on April 2, 1857
Oneida	3rd	John Holstead	Republican	
Oneida	4th	Ingham Townsend	Republican	
Onondaga	1st	John D. Rhoades	Republican	
Onondaga	2nd	Sidney Smith	Republican	
Onondaga	3rd	Elias W. Leavenworth	Republican	
Onondaga	4th	Charles H. Meade	Republican	
Ontario	1st	Samuel A. Foot*	Republican	
Ontario	2nd	Zoroaster Paul	Republican	
Orange	1st	James R. Dickson	Democrat	
Orange	2nd	George B. Cox	Republican	
Orange	3rd	Erastus Stickney	Democrat	
Orleans		Almanzor Hutchinson	Republican	
Oswego	1st	DeWitt C. Littlejohn	Republican	elected Speaker
Oswego	2nd	Leonard Ames	Republican	
Otsego	1st	Samuel H. Grant	Democrat	
Otsego	2nd	Charles W. Tallett	Republican	
Otsego	3rd	George M. Hollis	Republican	
Putnam		Chauncey R. Weeks	Republican	
Queens		David R. Floyd-Jones	Democrat	
Rensselaer	1st	Darius Allen	Democrat	
Rensselaer	2nd	Volney Richmond	Republican	
Rensselaer	3rd	Ebenezer S. Strait	American	
Richmond		Joshua Mersereau	Democrat	
Rockland		James Westervelt	Democrat	
St. Lawrence	1st	Emory W. Abbott*	Republican	
St. Lawrence	2nd	Benjamin Squire*	Republican	
St. Lawrence	3rd	Erasmus D. Brooks	Republican	
Saratoga	1st	George G. Scott*	Democrat	
Saratoga	2nd	Samuel J. Mott	Republican	
Schenectady		Nicholas Barhydt	Republican	
Schoharie	1st	Tobias Bouck	Democrat	
Schoharie	2nd	William H. Crowe	Democrat	
Seneca		Benson Owen	Republican	
Steuben	1st	Robert B. Van Valkenburgh	Republican	
Steuben	2nd	George T. Spencer	Republican	
Steuben	3rd	Solon O. Thacher	Republican	
Suffolk	1st	Edwin Rose	American	
Suffolk	2nd	Abraham G. Thompson	Democrat	
Sullivan		David B. Luckey	American	
Tioga		David Rees	Republican	
Tompkins	1st	Alexander Bower		did not take his seat, due to illness
Tompkins	2nd	Elias W. Cady	Republican	
Ulster	1st	Martin Schutt	American	
Ulster	2nd	Albert Carpenter	American	
Warren		Samuel Somerville Jr.	Republican	took his seat on January 14
Washington	1st	Anson Ingraham	Republican	
Washington	2nd	Henry W. Beckwith	Republican	
Wayne	1st	Thomas Johnson	Republican	
Wayne	2nd	Joseph Peacock	Republican	
Westchester	1st	Arnell F. Dickinson	Republican	
Westchester	2nd	Edmund G. Sutherland	Democrat	
Wyoming		Cyril Rawson	Republican	
Yates		Abraham V. Harpending	Republican	

=== Employees ===
- Clerk: William Richardson
- Sergeant-at-Arms: Norman P. Hitchcock
- Doorkeeper: Nathan Newhafer
- First Assistant Doorkeeper: Patrick Farrell
- Second Assistant Doorkeeper: John Lewis

== Sources ==
- The New York Civil List compiled by Franklin Benjamin Hough (Weed, Parsons and Co., 1858) [pg. 109 for Senate districts; pg. 137 for senators; pg. 148–157 for Assembly districts; pg. 252ff for assemblymen]
- Journal of the Senate (80th Session) (1857)
- Journal of the Assembly (80th Session) (1857)
- Pen and Ink Portraits of the Senators, Assemblymen, and State Officers of New York by G. W. Bungay (1857)
