= Senator Upham (disambiguation) =

William Upham (1792–1853) was a U.S. Senator from Vermont from 1843 to 1853. Senator Upham may also refer to:

- Alonzo S. Upham (1811–1882), New York State Senate
- Charles Wentworth Upham (1802–1875), Massachusetts State Senate
- George B. Upham (1768–1848), New Hampshire State Senate
