= Senator Darling =

Senator Darling may refer to:

- Alberta Darling (born 1944), Wisconsin State Senate
- Hale K. Darling (1869–1940), Vermont State Senate
- John P. Darling (1815–1882), New York State Senate
