= James Noxon =

American politician

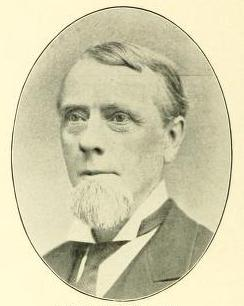

Justice of the New York Supreme Court
- In office 1876–1881

Member of the New York Senate from the 22nd district
- In office 1856–1859

Personal details
- Born: March 17, 1818 Onondaga Hill, New York
- Died: January 6, 1881 (aged 62) Syracuse, New York
- Party: Republican

James Noxon (March 17, 1818 in Onondaga Hill, Onondaga County, New York – January 6, 1881 in Syracuse, Onondaga Co., NY) was an American lawyer and politician from New York.

== Life ==
He was the son of Bartholomew Davis Noxon (1788–1869) and Sally Ann (Van Kleeck) Noxon (1793–1874). He attended Hamilton College from 1834 to 1836, and graduated from Union College in 1838. Then he studied law, was admitted to the bar in 1841, and practiced law in Syracuse, joining his father's firm of Noxon, Leavenworth & Comstock. On September 6, 1842, he married Elizabeth Rebecca Cadwell (1820–1859), and they had four children.

He was a member of the New York State Senate (22nd D.) from 1856 to 1859, sitting in the 79th, 80th, 81st and 82nd New York State Legislatures.

On October 2, 1860, me married Sarah Matilda Wright (1838–1922), and they had six children. He was a justice of the New York Supreme Court (5th D.) from 1876 until his death. He was buried at the Oakwood Cemetery in Syracuse.

== Sources ==
- The New York Civil List compiled by Franklin Benjamin Hough, Stephen C. Hutchins and Edgar Albert Werner (1867; pg. 441f)
- Biographical Sketches of the State Officers and Members of the Legislature of the State of New York in 1859 by William D. Murray (pg. 78ff)

New York State Senate
Preceded by James Munroe	New York State Senate; 22nd District; 1856–1859	Succeeded by Allen Munroe
