= Truman Boardman =

American politician

Truman Boardman (February 7, 1810 – April 21, 1895) was an American farmer and politician from New York.

== Life ==
He was the son of Allyn Boardman (1774–1837), a tanner and currier who came from Connecticut to Western New York in 1799, and Phoebe (Woodworth) Boardman (1776–1851). Truman Boardman was born in that part of the Town of Ovid, in Seneca County, New York, which was separated in 1817 as the Town of Covert. On June 5, 1834, he married Aurelia Chloe Whiting (1810–1893), and they had four children. He was elected Supervisor of the Town of Covert in 1849, 1851 and 1852.

He was a member of the New York State Senate (26th D.) in 1858 and 1859. In 1863, he moved to Trumansburg, New York. He was a member of the New York State Assembly (Tompkins Co.) in 1881.

His brother, Supreme Court Justice Douglas Boardman (1822–1891), was the first Dean of Cornell Law School, and lived in the Boardman House (Ithaca, New York).

== Sources ==
- The New York Civil List compiled by Franklin Benjamin Hough, Stephen C. Hutchins and Edgar Albert Werner (1867; pg. 442)
- Biographical Sketches of the State Officers and Members of the Legislature of the State of New York in 1859 by William D. Murray (pg. 36ff)
- Bio transcribed from Landmarks of Tompkins County, NY (1894)
- Boardman genealogy at Family Tree Maker

New York State Senate
Preceded by John K. Hale	New York State Senate; 26th District; 1858–1859	Succeeded by Thomas Hillhouse
New York State Assembly
Preceded by Charles M. Titus	New York State Assembly; Tompkins County; 1881	Succeeded by John E. Beers
