= Joseph H. Ramsey =

American politician

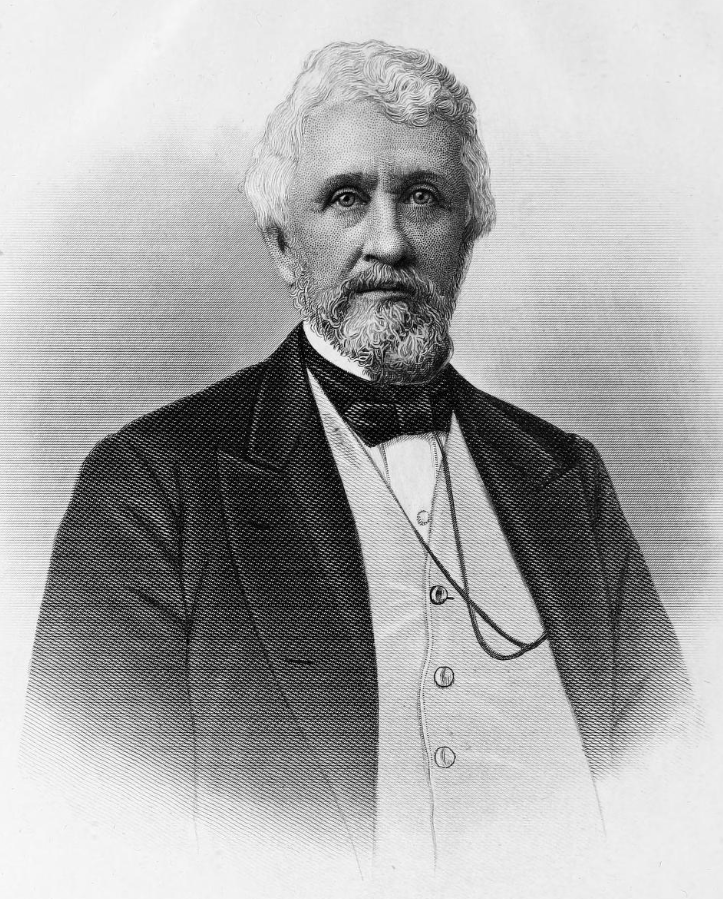

Member of the New York State Senate
- In office 1860–1863
- Constituency: 13th District

Member of the New York State Senate
- In office 1856–1857
- Constituency: 17th District

Member of the New York State Assembly
- In office 1855
- Constituency: Schoharie County, 2nd District

Personal details
- Born: Joseph Henry Ramsey; January 29, 1816 Sharon, New York
- Died: May 12, 1894 (aged 78) Howes Cave, New York
- Party: Whig; Republican
- Spouse: Sarah S. Boyce (m. 1835)
- Children: 2
- Occupation: Lawyer, railroad executive, politician
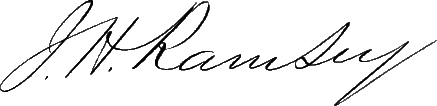
- Signature

Joseph Henry Ramsey (January 29, 1816 – May 12, 1894) was an American lawyer, railroad executive and politician from New York.

== Life ==
Joseph H. Ramsey was born in Sharon, New York on January 29, 1816, the son of Rev. Frederick Ramsey (1790–1879) and Sarah (Van Schaick) Ramsey (1799–1892). On March 17, 1835, he married Sarah S. Boyce, a granddaughter of Assemblyman John Rice, and they had two sons. Ramsey studied law in the office of Assemblyman Jedediah Miller, was admitted to the bar in 1840, and practiced law in Lawyersville.

He was a member of the New York State Assembly (Schoharie County, 2nd District) in 1855 as a Whig; and of the New York State Senate (17th D.) in 1856 and 1857 as a Republican. While in the Senate, Ramsey secured a law to finance the construction of the Albany and Susquehanna Railroad by authorizing the towns along the line to subscribe to the stock of the company, and he was chosen Vice President of the railroad in 1858. Litigation ensued, but the New York Court of Appeals upheld the law. In 1859, the Legislature authorized the State to help the railroad with $200,000 (~$5.58 million in 2024) but the law was vetoed by Gov. Edwin D. Morgan.

He was again a member of the State Senate (13th D.) from 1860 to 1863, sitting in the 83rd, 84th, 85th and 86th New York State Legislatures. He introduced three more bills to grant State funds for the completion of the railroad which also were all vetoed by Gov. Morgan. Finally, a bill appropriating $500,000 passed the Legislature and was signed by Gov. Horatio Seymour in 1863, and Ramsey was chosen President of the railroad. In 1868, Gov. Reuben E. Fenton allowed another $250,000 (~$5.22 million in 2024) of State funds to complete the construction, and the railroad began operating the completed line from Albany to Binghamton in 1869. Shortly afterwards Ramsey opposed the hostile take-over of the railroad by Jay Gould and James Fisk, and the next year the railroad was leased to the Delaware and Hudson Canal Company.

Ramsey died in Howes Cave, New York on May 12, 1894.

== Sources ==
- The New York Civil List compiled by Franklin Benjamin Hough, Stephen C. Hutchins and Edgar Albert Werner (1867; pg. 441ff and 480)
- Biographical Sketches of the State Officers and Members of the Legislature of the State of New York by William D. Murphy (1861; pg. 103ff)
- Bio transcribed from Noted Living Albanians and State Officials (1891), at Access Genealogy

New York State Assembly
Preceded by James S. Wood	New York State Assembly; Schoharie County, 2nd District; 1855	Succeeded by Charles Holmes
New York State Senate
Preceded by Peter S. Danforth	New York State Senate; 17th District; 1856–1857	Succeeded by William A. Wheeler
Preceded by Edward I. Burhans	New York State Senate; 13th District; 1860–1863	Succeeded by Orson M. Allaben
