= M. Lindley Lee =

American politician (1805–1876)

Moses Lindley Lee
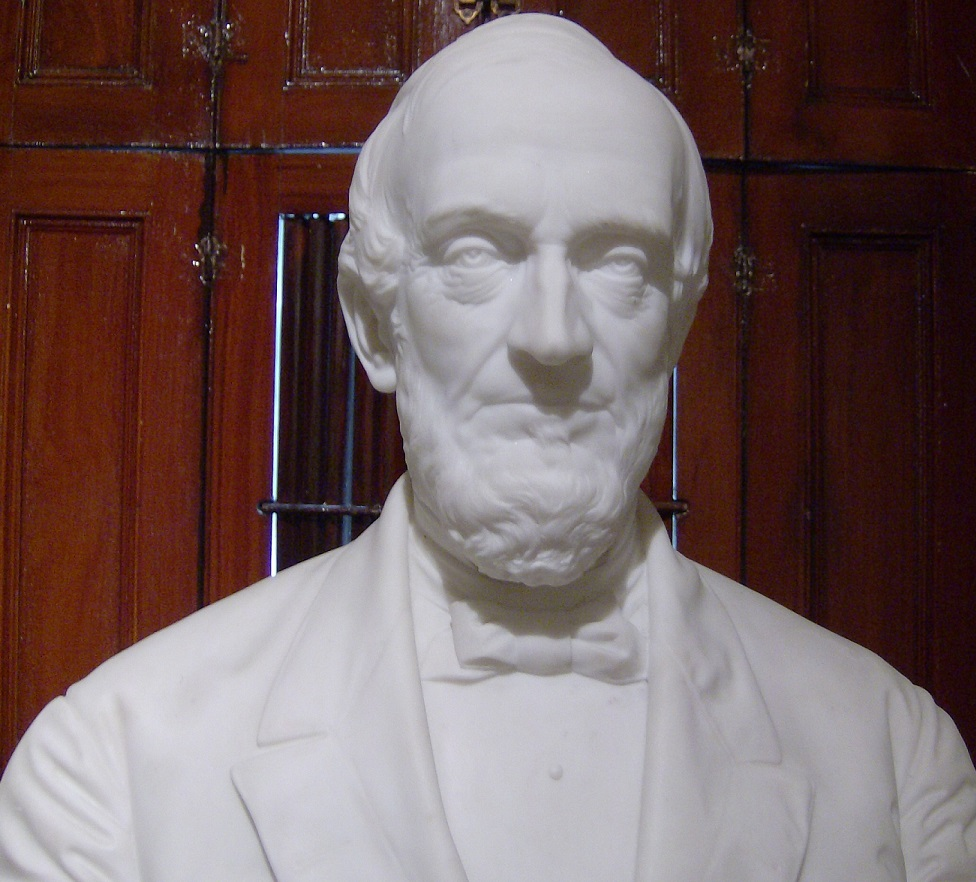

Personal details
- Born: May 29, 1805 Minisink, New York, US
- Died: May 19, 1876 Petersburg, Virginia, US
- Profession: physician

Moses Lindley Lee (May 29, 1805 – May 19, 1876) was a U.S. representative from New York.

Born in Minisink, New York, he graduated from Union College in 1827; and from the College of Physicians and Surgeons of Western New York in 1830. He practiced medicine in Fulton, Oswego County, New York. He was Postmaster of Fulton from 1840 to 1844.

He was a member of the New York State Assembly in 1847 (Oswego Co.); and 1848 (Oswego Co., 1st D.).

He was a member of the New York State Senate (20th D.) in 1856 and 1857.

Lee was elected as a Republican to the 36th United States Congress, holding office from March 4, 1859 to March 3, 1861. Afterwards he resumed the practice of medicine in Fulton.

Returning from a visit in the South, he became seriously ill at Petersburg, Virginia, and died there on May 19, 1876. He was buried at the Mount Adnah Cemetery in Fulton.

== Sources ==
- United States Congress. "M. Lindley Lee (id: L000199)". Biographical Directory of the United States Congress.

New York State Assembly
Preceded by new district	New York State Senate; Oswego County, 1st District; 1848	Succeeded by Henry Fitzhugh
New York State Senate
Preceded by Simon C. Hitchcock	New York State Senate; 20th District; 1856–1857	Succeeded by Addison H. Laflin
U.S. House of Representatives
Preceded by Henry C. Goodwin	Member of the U.S. House of Representatives from New York's 22nd congressional district 1859–1861	Succeeded by William E. Lansing
