= Frost Horton =

American politician (1806–1880)

Member of the New York State Assembly from the 3rd district
- Incumbent
- Assumed office 1858
- Preceded by: District created
- Succeeded by: Gaylord B. Hubbell

Personal details
- Born: September 15, 1806 Yorktown, New York, U.S.
- Died: November 11, 1880 (aged 74)

Frost Horton (September 15, 1806 – November 11, 1880) was an American manufacturer and politician from New York.

== Life ==
Horton was born on September 15, 1806, in Yorktown, New York, the son of farmer Wright Horton and Anna Quereau.

In 1829, Horton moved to Peekskill, where he worked as a blacksmith. In 1835, he entered a partnership with Truman Minor under the firm name Minor & Horton and entered the foundry business. The firm manufactured agricultural tools, mainly ploughs and plough-castings. When Minor retired in 1855, George W. Depou was brought in as a new partner. When Horton and Depou both brought in a son as partners, the firm became Horton, Depou & Sons. They sold the business to a stock company in 1862. He was also one of the first trustees of Peekskill, an original charter member of the Westchester County National Bank, treasurer of the Peekskill Gaslight Company, chief engineer of the village fire department, and town auditor.

Horton was elected town supervisor of Cortlandt in 1855 and served in that position for five years. In 1857, Horton was elected to the New York State Assembly as a member of the American Party, representing the Westchester County 3rd District. He served in the Assembly in 1858.

In 1827, Horton married Phebe Tompkins, a second cousin of New York Governor Daniel D. Tompkins. Their children were Stephen D., a manufacturer who was elected sheriff of Westchester County and village president of Peekskill, and William James. He was a Quaker.

Horton died at home on November 11, 1880. He was buried in Hillsdale Cemetery in Cortlandt Manor.

New York State Assembly
Preceded by District Created	New York State Assembly; Westchester County, 3rd District; 1858	Succeeded by Gaylord B. Hubbell
