= George Y. Johnson =

American politician

George Young Johnson (1820 Guilderland, Albany County, New York – June 30, 1872 Altamont, Albany County, New York) was an American politician from New York.

== Life ==
He was the son of physician Dr. Jonathan Johnson and Gertrude (Waldron) Johnson (1793–1864). After attending a district school, he became a dry-goods store clerk at age 16 and opened his own store four years later. Around 1853, he purchased a farm and took up agriculture. While managing his business, he privately studied medicine and law. He was admitted to the bar in 1856 but did not practice."

He was Supervisor of the Town of Guilderland from 1855 to 1857, and in 1856 was Chairman of the Board of Supervisors of Albany County.

He was a member of the New York State Senate (13th D.) in 1858 and 1859, nominated on the Know Nothing ticket, and endorsed by the Republicans.

His cousin Gertrude Young (b. 1810) was married to Wisconsin State Senator George Gale (1816–1868).

== Sources ==
- The New York Civil List compiled by Franklin Benjamin Hough, Stephen C. Hutchins and Edgar Albert Werner (1867; pg. 442)
- Biographical Sketches of the State Officers and Members of the Legislature of the State of New York in 1859 by William D. Murray (pg. 61ff)
- The Gale Family Records in England and the United States by George Gale (Galesville, Wisconsin, 1866; pg. 184f)
- George Young Johnson at Ancestry.com

New York State Senate
Preceded by Justin A. Smith	New York State Senate; 13th District; 1858–1859	Succeeded by Andrew J. Colvin
