= Edward I. Burhans =

American politician

Edward I. Burhans (March 25, 1804 Roxbury, Delaware County, New York – January 21, 1883) was an American merchant and politician from New York.

== Life ==
He was the son of John E. Burhans (d. 1838) and Mary (DuBois) Burhans. He worked on a farm until the age of 21, and then became a merchant. He was a Justice of the Peace in Roxbury from 1829 to 1845, and Postmaster of Roxbury from 1837 to 1850. On October 15, 1837, he married Mary More (1818–1857), and they had several children.

He was a member of the New York State Assembly (Delaware Co.) in 1844. He was an associate judge of the Delaware County Court from 1845 to 1847.

He was a member of the New York State Senate (14th D.) in 1858 and 1859. On November 13, 1858, he married Charity Barnett (1819–1882).

He was again a member of the State Assembly (Delaware Co., 2nd D.) in 1868.

== Sources ==
- The New York Civil List compiled by Franklin Benjamin Hough, Stephen C. Hutchins and Edgar Albert Werner (1867; pg. 327 and 442)
- Biographical Sketches of the State Officers and Members of the Legislature of the State of New York in 1859 by William D. Murray (pg. 40ff)
- FAILURES IN BUSINESS; NOTHING LEFT FOR THE CREDITORS OF BURHANS & LAUREN in NYT on December 16, 1886

New York State Senate
Preceded by William Hotchkiss	New York State Senate; 14th District; 1858–1859	Succeeded by Joseph H. Ramsey
New York State Assembly
Preceded by George C. Gibbs	New York State Assembly; Delaware County, 2nd District; 1868	Succeeded by John Ferris
