= John Hanford (politician) =

American politician and real estate agent

John Hanford (April 5, 1817 – April 1, 1863) was an American hatter, real estate agent, and politician from New York.

== Life ==
Hanford was born on April 5, 1817, in Norwalk Connecticut. He was the son of Charles Hanford, a commissioned officer during the War of 1812, and Ruth Seymour. He was a direct descendant of Thomas Hanford. Hanford started working as a hatter when he was 15, and worked in the trade until 1853, when he moved to the real estate business. He moved to Williamsburgh in 1838. He was elected trustee of Williamsburgh in 1845 and 1846. He also served as Deputy Sheriff of Kings County from 1847 to 1850. In 1855 he was elected to the New York State Assembly as a Democrat, representing the Kings County 1st District. He served in the Assembly in 1856, 1857, and 1858. In the 1860 congressional election, he unsuccessfully ran for Congress in New York's 5th congressional district.

In 1836, Hanford married Hannah Moore. They had no children.

Hanford died at home on April 1, 1863. He was buried in the Norwalk Union Cemetery.

New York State Assembly
Preceded by Augustus H. Ivans	New York State Assembly; Kings County, 1st District; 1856–1857	Succeeded by John A. Voorhees
Preceded by District Created	New York State Assembly; Kings County, 6th District; 1858	Succeeded by Abraham Messerole, Jr.
