= John E. Paterson =

American politician

John Egleston Paterson (born March 17, 1800, in Lisle, Broome County, New York; died before 1885) was an American farmer, lawyer and politician from New York.

== Life ==
He was the son of Josiah Lee Paterson (1766–1846), a farmer, and Clarissa (Hyde) Paterson (1767–1837). In 1813, the family removed to a farm in the area which was separated in 1817 as the Town of Ogden, then in Genesee County, since 1821 in Monroe County.

On February 1, 1827, he married Elizabeth Sheldon (1805–1828), removed to Parma Center, and engaged there in mercantile pursuits. About three years later he abandoned this and returned to farming instead. He was for decades a Justice of the Peace. He was elected Supervisor of the Town of Parma from 1834 to 1837, in 1851 and in 1853. He was an associate judge of the Monroe County Court from 1844 to 1847. Afterwards he was admitted to the bar, and practiced law in Parma.

Paterson joined the Free Soil Party in 1848, and the Republican Party upon its foundation in 1855. He was a member of the New York State Senate from 1856 to 1859, sitting in the 79th, 80th, 81st and 82nd New York State Legislature.

Congressman Thomas J. Paterson (1805–1885) was his brother; Congressman John Paterson (1744–1808) and State Senator Caleb Hyde were his grandfathers. Paterson was described as having died before his brother Thomas.

== Sources ==
- The New York Civil List compiled by Franklin Benjamin Hough, Stephen C. Hutchins and Edgar Albert Werner (1867; pg. 442)
- Biographical Sketches of the State Officers and Members of the Legislature of the State of New York in 1859 by William D. Murray (pg. 80ff)
- Hyde Genealogy compiled by Reuben H. Walworth (1863; pg. 270)

New York State Senate
Preceded by William S. Bishop	New York State Senate; 27th District; 1856–1857	Succeeded by Alexander S. Diven
Preceded by Alonzo S. Upham	New York State Senate; 28th District; 1858–1859	Succeeded by Ephraim Goss
