= 81st New York State Legislature =

New York state legislative session

←	80th	82nd	→
- The Old State Capitol (1879)

Overview
- Legislative body: New York State Legislature
- Jurisdiction: New York, United States
- Term: January 1 – December 31, 1858

Senate
- Members: 32
- President: Lt. Gov. Henry R. Selden (R)
- Temporary President: John B. Halsted (R), from January 12
- Party control: Republican plurality (15-14-2-1)

Assembly
- Members: 128
- Speaker: Thomas G. Alvord (D)
- Party control: Republican plurality (61-57-10)

Sessions
- 1st: January 5 – April 19, 1858

The 81st New York State Legislature, consisting of the New York State Senate and the New York State Assembly, met from January 5 to April 19, 1858, during the second year of John A. King's governorship, in Albany.

== Background ==
Under the provisions of the New York Constitution of 1846, 32 Senators and 128 assemblymen were elected in single-seat districts; senators for a two-year term, assemblymen for a one-year term. The senatorial districts were made up of entire counties, except New York County (four districts) and Kings County (two districts). The Assembly districts were made up of entire towns, or city wards, forming a contiguous area, all within the same county.

On April 13, the Legislature re-apportioned the Senate districts, and the Assembly seats per county. Cayuga, Dutchess, Genesee, Greene, Montgomery, Onondaga, Orange, Otsego, Schoharie and Tompkins counties lost one seat each; New York, Oswego, Queens, Ulster and Westchester counties gained one seat each; Kings County gained four seats; and the new Schuyler County was apportioned one seat.

At this time there were two major political parties: the Democratic Party and the Republican Party. The Know Nothing movement ran in the election as the "American Party."

== Elections ==
The 1857 New York state election was held on November 3. All eight statewide elective offices were carried by the Democrats. The approximate party strength at this election, as expressed by the vote for Secretary of State was: Democratic 195,000; Republican 177,000; and American 67,000.

== Sessions ==
The Legislature met for the regular session at the Old State Capitol in Albany on January 5, 1858; and adjourned on April 19.

On January 12, John B. Halsted (R) was elected president pro tempore of the State Senate..

On January 26, after three weeks of deadlock, Thomas G. Alvord (D) was elected Speaker on the 53rd ballot.

1858 Speaker election result
Ballot	Date	Robert B. Van Valkenburgh Rep.	Thomas G. Alvord Dem.	Samuel A. Law Amer.	Frost Horton Amer.	also ran
1st	Jan. 5	60	56	9		Adams
2nd	Jan. 5	60	56	9		Russell
3rd	Jan. 5	60	56	9		Bacheller
4th	Jan. 6	60	56	9		
5th	Jan. 6	60	56	9		
6th	Jan. 6	60	56	9		
7th	Jan. 6	60	56	9		
8th	Jan. 6	60	56	9		
9th	Jan. 7	60	55	8		
10th	Jan. 7	60	55	8		Adams
11th	Jan. 7	60	55	8	1	
12th	Jan. 7	60	53	8		Boughton
13th	Jan. 7	60	53	8		Reynolds
14th	Jan. 11	58	54	7		
15th	Jan. 11	58	54	7		Becker
16th	Jan. 11	58	54	7		Becker
17th	Jan. 11	58	54	7		Becker
18th	Jan. 11	58	54	7		Becker
19th	Jan. 11	58	54	7		Becker
20th	Jan. 11	58	54	7		Becker
21st	Jan. 12	58	54	7		Hodge
22nd	Jan. 12	59	54	7		Hodge
23rd	Jan. 12	58	54	7		Hodge
24th	Jan. 12	58	53	7		Hodge
25th	Jan. 13	60	55	7		D. Miller
26th	Jan. 13	60	55	8		D. Miller
27th	Jan. 13	60	55	8		D. Miller
28th	Jan. 13	60	55	8		D. Miller
29th	Jan. 13	60	55	8		D. Miller
30th	Jan. 14	56	52	7		Bacheller
31st	Jan. 14	56	52	7		Bacheller
32nd	Jan. 14	56	52	7		Bacheller
33rd	Jan. 14	56	52	7		Bacheller
34th	Jan. 14	56	54	7		Bacheller
35th	Jan. 14	55	51	7		Bacheller
36th	Jan. 14	55	51	7		Bacheller
37th	Jan. 14	55	51	7		Bacheller
38th	Jan. 15	54	49	1	6	
39th	Jan. 15	54	49	1	7	
40th	Jan. 16	45	40	1	7	
41st	Jan. 16	45	40	1	7	
42nd	Jan. 19	54	48	1	7	
43rd	Jan. 19	54	48	1	7	
44th	Jan. 21	55	50	1	6	
45th	Jan. 21	55	50	1	6	
46th	Jan. 21	55	50	1	7	
47th	Jan. 21	55	50	1	7	
48th	Jan. 21	55	50	1	7	
49th	Jan. 21	55	50	1	7	
50th	Jan. 22	54	49	1	6	
51st	Jan. 22	52	47	1	6	
52nd	Jan. 26	54	49	1	7	
53rd	Jan. 26	55	57		2	

== State Senate ==
=== Districts ===
- 1st District: Queens, Richmond and Suffolk counties
- 2nd District: 1st, 2nd, 3rd, 4th, 5th, 7th, 11th, 13th and 19th wards of the City of Brooklyn
- 3rd District: 6th, 8th, 9th, 10th, 12th, 14th, 15th, 16th, 17th and 18th wards of the City of Brookland; and all towns in Kings County
- 4th District: 1st, 2nd, 3rd, 4th, 5th, 6th, 7th, 8th and 14th wards of New York City
- 5th District: 10th, 11th, 13th and 17th wards of New York City
- 6th District: 9th, 15th, 16th and 18th wards of New York City
- 7th District: 12th, 19th, 20th, 21st and 22nd wards of New York City
- 8th District: Putnam, Rockland and Westchester counties
- 9th District: Orange and Sullivan counties
- 10th District: Greene and Ulster counties
- 11th District: Columbia and Dutchess counties
- 12th District: Rensselaer and Washington counties
- 13th District: Albany County
- 14th District: Delaware, Schenectady and Schoharie counties
- 15th District: Fulton, Hamilton, Montgomery and Saratoga counties
- 16th District: Clinton, Essex and Warren counties
- 17th District: Franklin and St. Lawrence counties
- 18th District: Jefferson and Lewis counties
- 19th District: Oneida County
- 20th District: Herkimer and Otsego counties
- 21st District: Oswego County
- 22nd District: Onondaga County
- 23rd District: Chenango, Cortland and Madison counties
- 24th District: Broome, Tompkins and Tioga counties
- 25th District: Cayuga and Wayne counties
- 26th District: Ontario, Seneca and Yates counties
- 27th District: Chemung, Schuyler and Steuben counties
- 28th District: Monroe County
- 29th District: Genesee, Niagara and Orleans counties
- 30th District: Allegany, Livingston and Wyoming counties
- 31st District: Erie County
- 32nd District: Cattaraugus and Chautauqua counties
Note: There are now 62 counties in the State of New York. The counties which are not mentioned in this list had not yet been established, or sufficiently organized, the area being included in one or more of the abovementioned counties.

=== Members ===
The asterisk (*) denotes members of the previous Legislature who continued in office as members of this Legislature. James Noxon, John E. Paterson, John B. Halsted, James Wadsworth and John P. Darling were re-elected. George G. Scott and Ralph A. Loveland changed from the Assembly to the Senate.

Party affiliations follow the vote for Senate officers.

District	Senator	Party	Notes
1st	Joshua B. Smith	Democrat	
2nd	Samuel Sloan	Democrat	
3rd	Francis B. Spinola	Democrat	
4th	John C. Mather	Democrat	
5th	Smith Ely, Jr.	Democrat	
6th	Richard Schell	Democrat	
7th	John Doherty	Democrat	
8th	Benjamin Brandreth	Democrat	
9th	Osmer B. Wheeler	American	
10th	George W. Pratt	Democrat	
11th	William G. Mandeville	Democrat	
12th	John D. Willard	Democrat	
13th	George Y. Johnson	American	
14th	Edward I. Burhans	Democrat	
15th	George G. Scott*	Democrat	
16th	Ralph A. Loveland*	Republican	
17th	William A. Wheeler	Republican	
18th	Joseph A. Willard	Republican	
19th	Alrick Hubbell	Republican	
20th	Addison H. Laflin	Republican	
21st	Cheney Ames	Republican	
22nd	James Noxon*	Republican	
23rd	John J. Foote	Republican	
24th	Lyman Truman	Republican	
25th	Alexander B. Williams	Republican	
26th	Truman Boardman	Republican	
27th	Alexander S. Diven	Republican	
28th	John E. Paterson*	Republican	
29th	Horatio J. Stow	Independent	
30th	John B. Halsted*	Republican	on January 12, elected president pro tempore
31st	James Wadsworth*	Democrat	resigned on August 18, 1858
32nd	John P. Darling*	Republican	also Supervisor of New Albion

=== Employees ===
- Clerk: Samuel P. Allen
- Deputy Clerk: Henry J. Sickles
- Sergeant-at-Arms: Henry W. Dwight
- Assistant Sergeant-at-Arms: Simeon Dillingham
- Doorkeeper: Richard U. Owens
- First Assistant Doorkeeper: Henry W. Shipman
- Second Assistant Doorkeeper: Samuel Ten Eyck
- Third Assistant Doorkeeper: James P. Clark
- Journal Clerk: James Terwilliger
- Engrossing Clerks: A. N. Cole, Charles G. Fairman

== State Assembly ==
=== Assemblymen ===
The asterisk (*) denotes members of the previous Legislature who continued as members of this Legislature.

Party affiliations follow the original vote for Speaker.

District		Assemblymen	Party	Notes
Albany	1st	Dwight Bacheller	American	
Albany	2nd	George Wolford	Republican	
Albany	3rd	Cornelius W. Armstrong	Democrat	
Albany	4th	Charles H. Adams	American	
Allegany	1st	John M. Hammond	Republican	
Allegany	2nd	William F. Jones	Republican	
Broome		John S. Palmer	Republican	
Cattaraugus	1st	Henry Van Aernam	Republican	
Cattaraugus	2nd	William Buffington Jr.	Republican	
Cayuga	1st	David B. Baldwin	Republican	
Cayuga	2nd	Chauncey M. Abbott	Republican	
Chautauqua	1st	Henry Bliss	Republican	
Chautauqua	2nd	Charles B. Green	Republican	
Chemung		John Haggerty	Democrat	
Chenango	1st	Truxton G. Lamb	Republican	
Chenango	2nd	William Kales	Republican	
Clinton		Zephaniah C. Platt	Democrat	
Columbia	1st	David Miller	American	
Columbia	2nd	Lorenzo Gile	Republican	
Cortland		Nathan Bouton	Republican	
Delaware	1st	Fletcher Palmer	Republican	
Delaware	2nd	Samuel A. Law	American	
Dutchess	1st	Albert Emans	Democrat	
Dutchess	2nd	Ambrose Wager	Democrat	
Erie	1st	Albert P. Laning	Democrat	
Erie	2nd	Andrew J. McNett	Democrat	
Erie	3rd	John T. Wheelock	Democrat	
Erie	4th	Amos Avery	Republican	
Essex		Monroe Hall	Republican	
Franklin		Charles Russell	American	
Fulton and Hamilton		John C. Holmes	Democrat	
Genesee		Franklin G. Kingman	Republican	
Greene		Daniel B. Strong	Democrat	
Herkimer	1st	William Coppernoll	Republican	
Herkimer	2nd	Harris Lewis*	Republican	
Jefferson	1st	George Babbitt	Republican	
Jefferson	2nd	Elihu C. Church	Republican	
Jefferson	3rd	Robert F. Austin	Republican	
Kings	1st	John A. Voorhees	Democrat	
Kings	2nd	Moses S. Beach	Democrat	
Kings	3rd	Harmanus B. Duryea	Republican	
Kings	4th	David M. Chauncey	Democrat	
Kings	5th	John A. Dayton	Democrat	
Kings	6th	John Hanford*	Democrat	
Kings	7th	George W. Bleecker	Democrat	
Lewis		Homer Collins	Republican	
Livingston	1st	John H. Jones	Democrat	
Livingston	2nd	Alfred Bell (politician)*	Republican	
Madison	1st	Lester M. Case	Republican	
Madison	2nd	Robert Stewart	Republican	
Monroe	1st	Jarvis Lord	Democrat	
Monroe	2nd	Thomas Parsons	Democrat	
Monroe	3rd	Robert Staples*	Republican	
Montgomery		Hezekiah Baker*	Republican	
New York	1st	Jacob L. Smith	Democrat	
New York	2nd	Michael Fitzgerald	Democrat	
New York	3rd	Richard Winne	Democrat	
New York	4th	John G. Seeley	Democrat	unsuccessfully contested by James A. Dolan (Am.)
New York	5th	Arthur J. Delaney	Democrat	
New York	6th	George A. Jeremiah	Democrat	
New York	7th	Philip W. Engs	Democrat	
New York	8th	James H. Lynch	Democrat	
New York	9th	Thomas Jones Jr.	Democrat	
New York	10th	John W. Chanler	Democrat	
New York	11th	Noah D. Childs	Democrat	
New York	12th	William Gage	Democrat	
New York	13th	David J. Chatfield	Democrat	
New York	14th	Dunham J. Crain	Democrat	
New York	15th	Edward A. Moore	Democrat	
New York	16th	George Weir	Democrat	
New York	17th	Garret Dyckman	Democrat	
Niagara	1st	Burt Van Horn	Republican	
Niagara	2nd	John W. Labar	Republican	
Oneida	1st	Henry R. Hart	Democrat	
Oneida	2nd	William J. McKown	Republican	
Oneida	3rd	Thomas G. Halley	Republican	
Oneida	4th	Reuben Knight	Republican	
Onondaga	1st	James Frazee	Republican	unsuccessfully contested by Sidney H. Cook
Onondaga	2nd	Thomas G. Alvord	Democrat	elected Speaker
Onondaga	3rd	Levi S. Holbrook	Republican	
Ontario	1st	Volney Edgerton	Republican	
Ontario	2nd	Ira R. Peck	Republican	
Orange	1st	Stephen W. Fullerton	Republican	
Orange	2nd	Charles J. Stevenson	Democrat	
Orleans		Almanzor Hutchinson*	Republican	
Oswego	1st	William Baldwin	Democrat	
Oswego	2nd	John J. Wolcott	Republican	
Oswego	3rd	Chauncey S. Sage	Republican	
Otsego	1st	Charles McLean	Democrat	
Otsego	2nd	David M. Hard	Republican	
Putnam		John Garrison	Democrat	
Queens	1st	Edward A. Lawrence	Democrat	
Queens	2nd	John S. Hendrickson	Democrat	
Rensselaer	1st	Jason C. Osgood	Democrat	
Rensselaer	2nd	Daniel Fish	Republican	
Rensselaer	3rd	Martin Miller	Democrat	
Richmond		Eben W. Hubbard	Democrat	
Rockland		Wesley J. Weiant	Democrat	
St. Lawrence	1st	Harlow Godard	Republican	
St. Lawrence	2nd	William Briggs	Republican	
St. Lawrence	3rd	Oscar F. Shepard	Republican	
Saratoga	1st	Chauncey Boughton	American	
Saratoga	2nd	Tabor B. Reynolds	American	
Schenectady		Angus McIntosh	Republican	
Schoharie		John H. Salisbury	Democrat	
Schuyler		Henry Fish	Democrat	
Seneca		Augustus Woodworth	Democrat	
Steuben	1st	Robert B. Van Valkenburgh*	Republican	
Steuben	2nd	Washington Barnes	Republican	
Steuben	3rd	William B. Jones	Republican	
Suffolk	1st	George Howell	Democrat	
Suffolk	2nd	George P. Mills	Democrat	
Sullivan		Asa Hodge	American	
Tioga		William P. Raymond	Republican	
Tompkins		Edward S. Esty	Republican	
Ulster	1st	Fordyce L. Laflin	Democrat	
Ulster	2nd	Isaac Becker	American	
Ulster	3rd	Nathan W. Watson	Democrat	
Warren		Alexander Robertson	Republican	
Washington	1st	Thaddeus H. Walker	Republican	
Washington	2nd	Ralph Richards	Republican	
Wayne	1st	Edward W. Sentell	Republican	
Wayne	2nd	Charles Estes	Republican	
Westchester	1st	Abraham B. Tappen	Democrat	
Westchester	2nd	Edmund G. Sutherland*	Democrat	
Westchester	3rd	Frost Horton	American	
Wyoming		Cyril Rawson*	Republican	
Yates		John Mather	Republican	

=== Employees ===
- Clerk: David Wilson
- Assistant Clerk: Edwin O. Perrin
- Sergeant-at-Arms: Philip H. Lasher
- Doorkeeper: Peter J. Cook
- First Assistant Doorkeeper: John Davis
- Second Assistant Doorkeeper: James Swarthout
- Journal Clerk: Joseph B. Cushman

== Sources ==
- The New York Civil List compiled by Franklin Benjamin Hough, Stephen C. Hutchins and Edgar Albert Werner (1867; see pg. 439 for Senate districts; pg. 442 for senators; pg. 450–462 for Assembly districts; and pg. 485ff for assemblymen)
- Journal of the Senate (81st Session) (1858)
- Journal of the Assembly (81st Session) (1858)
- Biographical Sketches of the State Officers and Members of the Legislature of the State of New York in 1858 by William D. Murphy
- The Evening Journal Almanac (Senate and Assembly members with party affiliations and election endorsements, pg. 21–35)
