= John K. Hale (New York politician) =

American politician

John K. Hale (c. 1812 – May 23, 1879) was an American lawyer and politician from New York.

== Life ==
He was the son of John Hale and Mary (Jones) Hale. He was born in the Northern part of the District of Maine, then part of Massachusetts. In 1828, he married a daughter of J. Hall, of Portland, Maine.

Hale studied law with William G. Angel.

Hale removed to Addison, and in 1836 to Hornellsville, both in Steuben County, New York.

He was a member of the New York State Assembly (Steuben Co., 3rd D.) in 1849.

He was a member of the New York State Senate (26th D.) in 1856 and 1857. He moved to Wyandotte County, Kansas in 1863 and formed a law partnership with Kansas attorney A. B. Bartlett. For several years they were the leading law firm in that city, having a large and lucrative practice, including representation of the Kansas Pacific Railway.

His wife's sister Eleanor (1809–1877) was married to the controversial author John Neal (1793–1876). In his later years, Hale had a stroke of paralysis, from which he never fully recovered. He died at the home of his daughter in Cortland, New York.

== Sources ==
- The New York Civil List compiled by Franklin Benjamin Hough (pages 137, 141, 237 and 278; Weed, Parsons and Co., 1858)
- Pen and Ink Portraits of the Senators, Assemblymen, and State Officers of New York by G. W. Bungay (1857; pg. 31)
- American Biographical Panorama by William Hunt (Albany, 1849; pg. 354f)
- John Augustus Hale (his nephew) transcribed from Kansas: a Cyclopedia of State History etc. (Chicago, 1912)

New York State Assembly
Preceded by Alexander H. Stephens	New York State Assembly; Steuben County, 3rd District; 1849	Succeeded by James Alley
New York State Senate
Preceded by Andrew B. Dickinson	New York State Senate; 26th District; 1856–1857	Succeeded by Truman Boardman
