= George G. Scott =

American politician

George Gordon Scott (May 11, 1811 – September 7, 1886) was an American lawyer and politician from New York.

== Life ==
He was born in Ballston, New York to James Scott and Mary (Botsford) Scott. He graduated from Union College in 1831. Then he studied law, was admitted to the bar in 1834, and commenced practice in Ballston Spa. He was a Justice of the Peace from 1837 to 1849; and an associate judge of the Saratoga County Court from 1838 to 1840. On January 23, 1839, he married Lucy Pitkin Lee (b. 1814), and they had six children.

He was a member of the New York State Assembly (Saratoga Co., 1st D.) in 1856 and 1857; and of the New York State Senate (15th D.) in 1858 and 1859.

At the New York state election, 1861, he ran on the Democratic ticket for New York State Comptroller but was defeated by Lucius Robinson.

He was Supervisor of the Town of Ballston from 1861 to 1881. He was Chairman of the Board of Supervisors of Saratoga County in 1863 and 1876.

He died in Ballston, N.Y., and was buried at the Ballston Spa Village Cemetery.

Congressman James Gordon was his great-uncle.

== Sources ==
- The New York Civil List compiled by Franklin Benjamin Hough, Stephen C. Hutchins and Edgar Albert Werner (1867; pg. 442, 482 and 484)
- Biographical Sketches of the State Officers and Members of the Legislature of the State of New York in 1859 by William D. Murray (pg. 89ff)
- Scott genealogy at Schenectady History

New York State Assembly
Preceded by Cornelius Schuyler	New York State Assembly; Saratoga County, 1st District; 1856–1857	Succeeded by Chauncey Boughton
New York State Senate
Preceded by Bloomfield Usher	New York State Senate; 15th District; 1858–1859	Succeeded by Isaiah Blood
