= Ralph A. Loveland =

American politician

Ralph Andrus Loveland (January 17, 1819 in Westport, Essex County, New York – November 9, 1899) was an American politician from New York.

== Life ==
He was the son of Erastus Loveland (1793–1882) and Lucy (Bradley) Loveland (1794–1866).

He was in the transportation business from 1840 to 1853, and then manufactured pig iron until 1856. In 1840, he married Harriet Mehitable Kent (1818–1887), and they had several children.

He entered politics as a Whig, was a delegate to the Anti-Nebraska Party state convention in 1854, and joined the Republican Party upon its foundation. He was Supervisor of the Town of Westport for several terms.

He was a member of the New York State Assembly (Essex Co.) in 1857; and of the New York State Senate (16th D.) in 1858 and 1859.

Later he removed to East Saginaw, Michigan, and became engaged in the lumber trade.

He was buried at the Forest Lawn Cemetery in Saginaw.

== Sources ==
- The New York Civil List compiled by Franklin Benjamin Hough, Stephen C. Hutchins and Edgar Albert Werner (1867; pg. 442 and 483)
- Biographical Sketches of the State Officers and Members of the Legislature of the State of New York in 1859 by William D. Murray (pg. 67ff)
- Loveland genealogy at Thomas Rogers Society

New York State Assembly
Preceded by John A. Lee	New York State Assembly; Essex County; 1857	Succeeded by Monroe Hall
New York State Senate
Preceded by Frederick P. Bellinger	New York State Senate; 16th District; 1858–1859	Succeeded by Nathan Lapham
