= Edmund G. Sutherland =

American politician

Edmund Gaines Sutherland (1815 Plymouth, Chenango County, New York – May 16, 1883) was an American newspaper publisher and politician from New York.

== Life ==
He was the son of Silas Sutherland and Lydia (Tiffany) Sutherland. In 1831, he became a printer, working first for the Troy Statesman, a weekly paper published by his half-brother Thomas Jefferson Sutherland; then for the Berkshire Advocate at North Adams, Massachusetts; the North River Times in Haverstraw, New York (from 1834); the New Orleans Observer (in 1836); the True American (also in New Orleans, in 1837); and, beginning in the fall of 1837, the Hudson River Chronicle in Sing Sing, New York. In 1840, Sutherland bought the paper from publisher Alexander H. Wells, who had been appointed Surrogate of Westchester County. In 1844 Sutherland sold the Chronicle, and in 1845 established in White Plains the Eastern State Journal, the leading Democratic paper of Westchester County.

He was Superintendent of Common Schools of White Plains in 1853 and 1854; Clerk of the Board of Supervisors of Westchester County from 1858 to 1861; Supervisor of the Town of White Plains for several terms beginning in 1862; and Chairman of the Board of Supervisors of Westchester County from 1863 to 1865.

He was a member of the New York State Assembly (Westchester Co., 2nd D.) in 1857 and 1858.

He was a member of the New York State Senate (8th D.) in 1866 and 1867.

He was buried at the White Plains Cemetery.

== Sources ==
- The New York Civil List compiled by Franklin Benjamin Hough, Stephen C. Hutchins and Edgar Albert Werner (1870; pg. 444, 486 and 488)
- Life Sketches of the State Officers, Senators, and Members of the Assembly of the State of New York, in 1867 by S. R. Harlow & H. H. Boone (pg. 147ff)
- CITY AND SUBURBAN NEWS; The funeral of the late ex-State Senator Edmund G. Sutherland... in NYT on May 20, 1883

New York State Assembly
Preceded by Eli Curtis	New York State Assembly; Westchester County, 2nd District; 1857–1858	Succeeded by James S. See
New York State Senate
Preceded by Saxton Smith	New York State Senate; 8th District; 1866–1867	Succeeded by Henry W. Genet
