= Alfred Bell (politician) =

American politician

Alfred Bell was an American politician. He was a member of the 81st New York State Legislature representing Livingston, New York in 1858.
