= Alonzo S. Upham =

American politician

Alonzo Sidney Upham (June 9, 1811 Hamilton, Madison County, New York – August 12, 1882 Baldwinsville, Onondaga County, New York) was an American manufacturer and politician from New York.

== Life ==
He was the son of Joshua Upham (1767–1855) and Lydia (Chamberlain) Upham (1771–1860). He was a carriage-maker, and later a manufacturer of railroad cars, in LeRoy, Genesee County, New York. On April 17, 1836, he married Mary Munro (1808–1864), and they had six children who all died in infancy.

He was a member of the New York State Assembly (Genesee Co., 2nd D.) in 1847 and 1848.

He was a member of the New York State Senate (28th D.) from 1850 to 1853, and from 1856 to 1857, sitting in the 73rd, 74th, 75th, 76th, 79th and 80th New York State Legislatures. He was Temporary Chairman of the Whig state convention of 1855. On January 29, 1856, he was elected President pro tempore of the State Senate (79th Session). He was President of the New York State Agricultural Society in 1857.

In 1862, he was nominated by President Abraham Lincoln as Secretary of the Territory of New Mexico, but was rejected by the U.S. Senate.

On December 11, 1867, he married Emily Louise Munro (1832–1920, a niece of his first wife), and they had a son who died when six years old.

He was buried at the Riverview Cemetery in Baldwinsville.

== Sources ==
- The New York Civil List compiled by Franklin Benjamin Hough (pages 137, 146, 233f and 311; Weed, Parsons and Co., 1858)
- Pen and Ink Portraits of the Senators, Assemblymen, and State Officers of New York by G. W. Bungay (1857; pg. 71)
- U.S. Senate vote on July 17, 1862

New York State Assembly
Preceded by Aaron Long	New York State Assembly; Genesee County, 2nd District; 1847–1848	Succeeded by Martin C. Ward
New York State Senate
Preceded by A. Hyde Cole	New York State Senate; 28th District; 1850–1853	Succeeded by Ben Field
Preceded by Ben Field	New York State Senate; 23rd District; 1856–1857	Succeeded by John E. Paterson
