= John P. Darling =

American politician

John P. Darling (February 25, 1815 in Berkshire County, Massachusetts – June 17, 1882) was an American politician from New York.

== Life ==
He was the son of Rufus Darling (1781–1828), a farmer, and Prudy (Lee) Darling (1787–1873). The family removed in 1818 to Lenox, Madison County, New York, and in 1824 to Cattaraugus County. After the death of his father, John worked as a raftsman on the Allegany River, a cutter of cord wood, a farm-hand, and a clerk in a dry-goods store in Waverly. In 1838, he became a merchant. In the same year, he married Abiah Strickland (b. 1813), and they had two daughters.

Darling entered politics as a Whig, joined the American Party for a short time, and finally the Republican Party in 1856. He was Clerk of the Town of Otto for several terms beginning in 1837. He was Supervisor of the Town of Otto for several terms, first in 1845. He was Postmaster of Otto from 1850 to 1853, and Treasurer of Cattaraugus County from 1852 to 1854.

In 1853, he removed to Cattaraugus, New York, and was Supervisor of the Town of New Albion in 1855, 1858, 1860, 1863, 1865, 1867 and 1875. He was a member of the New York State Senate (32nd D.) from 1857 to 1859, sitting in the 80th, 81st and 82nd New York State Legislatures.

He was a presidential elector on the Union ticket in 1864, voting for Abraham Lincoln and Andrew Johnson.

== Sources ==
- The New York Civil List compiled by Franklin Benjamin Hough, Stephen C. Hutchins and Edgar Albert Werner (1867; pg. 441f, 542 and 580)
- Biographical Sketches of the State Officers and Members of the Legislature of the State of New York in 1859 by William D. Murray (pg. 43ff)
- Bio and portrait transcribed from The History of Cattaraugus County, NY by Franklin Ellis (1879; pg. 381-390), at Painted Hills
- Tremayne's Table of the Post-Offices in the United States compiled by Edward Tremayne (1850; pg. 109)

New York State Senate
Preceded by Roderick White	New York State Senate; 32nd District; 1857–1859	Succeeded by Walter L. Sessions
