= Elias W. Leavenworth =

American politician

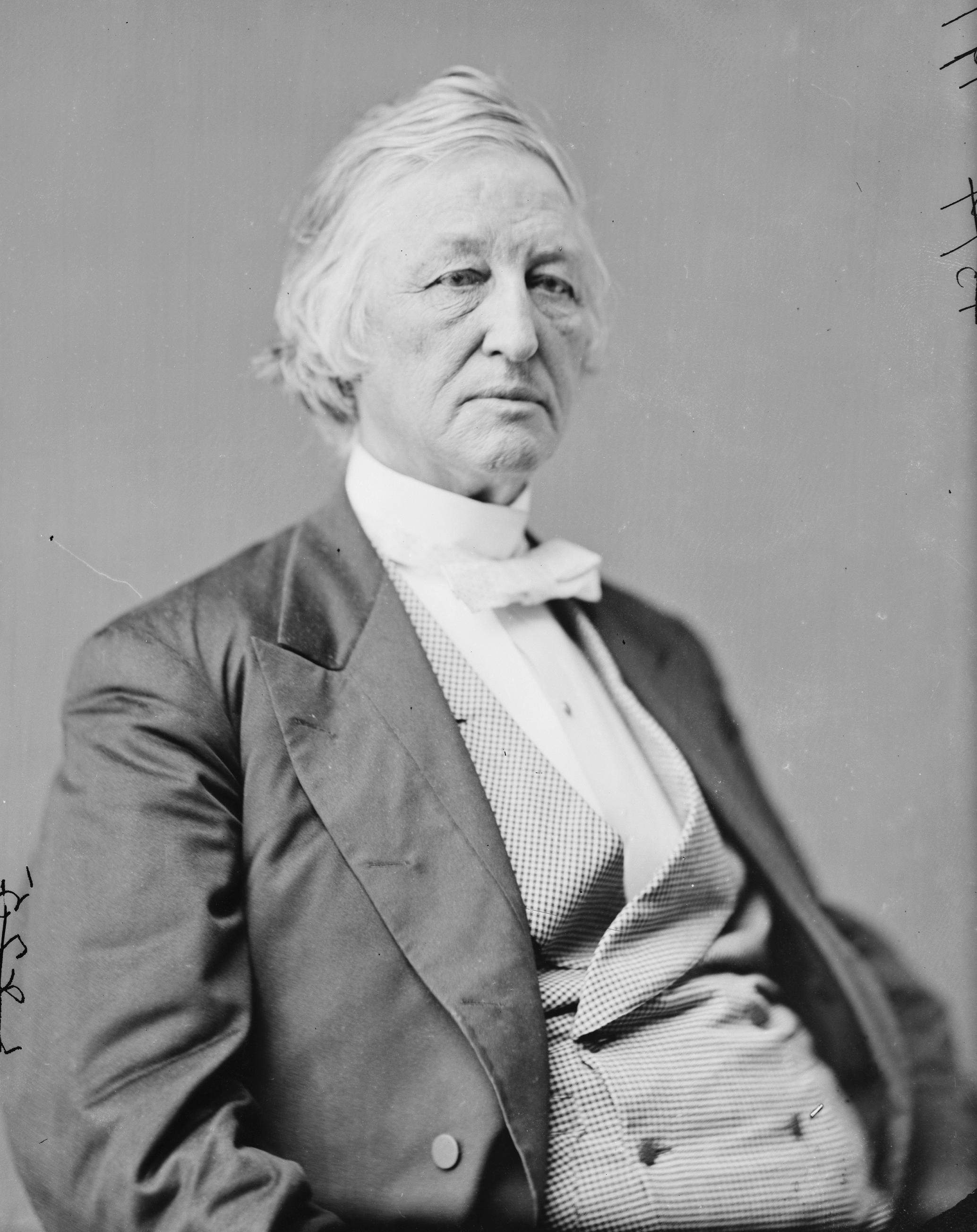
- Elias W. Leavenworth

Personal details
- Born: December 20, 1803 Canaan, New York, United States
- Died: November 25, 1887 (aged 83) Syracuse, New York, United States
- Occupation: Mayor, Politician, Lawyer

Elias Warner Leavenworth (December 20, 1803 – November 25, 1887) was an American lawyer and politician.

== Biography ==
He was born in Canaan, New York, and lived there before moving to Great Barrington, Massachusetts, in 1806. He graduated from Yale College in 1824. He studied law at the Litchfield Law School from 1825 to 1827. He passed the bar exam in 1827 and practiced law in Syracuse, New York, for 20 years until 1850, when he retired from the practice because of ill health.

=== Personal life ===
Leavenworth married the daughter of Joshua Forman, who was the founder of Syracuse, New York. His principal home, a mansion at 607 James Street in Syracuse, was a significant Greek Revival style structure where he received visitors of national and international stature.

=== Political life ===
In 1839, he was named supervisor of the old town of Salina, the first election at which the Democrats had been beaten for 15 years.

He was president of Syracuse village from 1839 to 1841 and from 1846 to 1847, and was mayor of the town in 1849, 1850, 1859, and 1860.

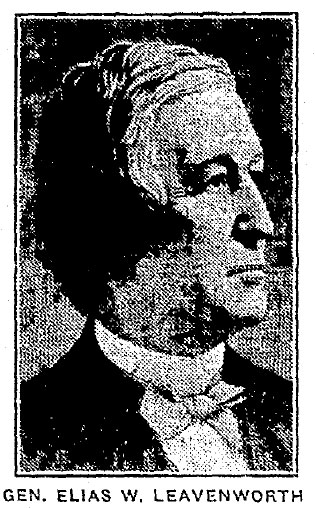
General Elias W. Leavenworth - Twice mayor of Syracuse, New York, Syracuse Herald, May 31, 1925

Leavenworth was a Whig member of the New York State Assembly (Onondaga Co., 3rd D.) in 1850 and 1857; and was Secretary of State of New York from 1854 to 1855. He was Chairman of the Republican State convention of 1860. In 1861 President Abraham Lincoln appointed Leavenworth the United States' commissioner for the convention with Granadine Confederation in 1861 and 1862.

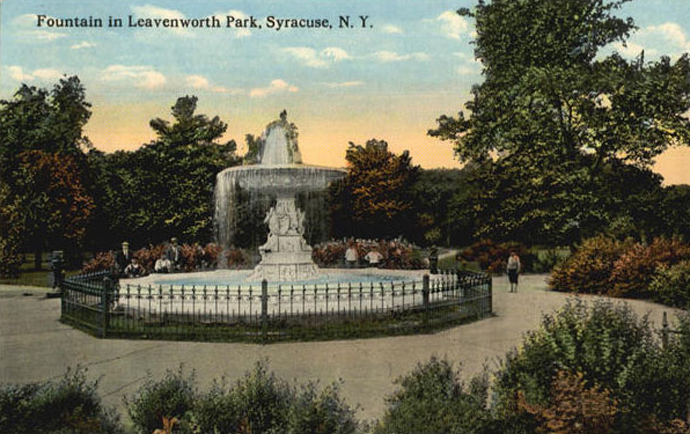
Leavenworth Park in Syracuse, New York. Postcard, 1910

Leavenworth was elected as a Republican to the Forty-fourth United States Congress, holding office from March 4, 1875, to March 3, 1877. He declined to be a candidate for renomination in 1876 and resumed business activities in Syracuse.

=== Syracuse parks ===
A resolution he introduced in 1888 procured Vanderbilt Square for the city of Syracuse. Additionally he persuaded the railroad to plant rows of trees on each side of the railroad from Beech Street to the heart of the city and install the first public sewer.

He was considered father of the park system of the city. Fayette Park was obtained through his efforts. About 1860, Leavenworth Park was named after him.

=== Later life ===
He died on November 25, 1887, in Syracuse, New York, and was buried at the Oakwood Cemetery.

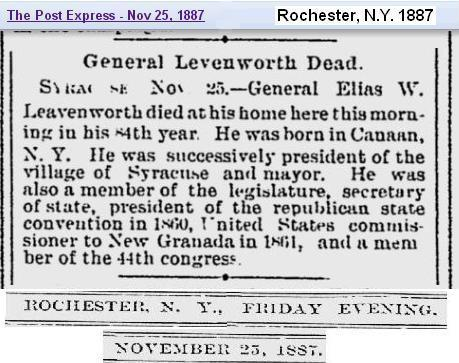
Death Notice

New York State Assembly
Preceded by Joseph Slocum	New York State Assembly; Onondaga County, 3rd District; 1850	Succeeded by George Stevens
Preceded by Burr Burton	New York State Assembly; Onondaga County, 3rd District; 1857	Succeeded by Levi S. Holbrook
Political offices
Preceded by Henry S. Randall	New York Secretary of State; 1854–1855	Succeeded by Joel T. Headley
U.S. House of Representatives
Preceded by Clinton D. MacDougall	Member of the U.S. House of Representatives from New York's 25th congressional district March 4, 1875 – March 3, 1877	Succeeded by Frank Hiscock
