= 1855 New York state election =

- November 6, 1855

The 1855 New York state election was held on November 6, 1855, to elect the Secretary of State, the State Comptroller, the Attorney General, the State Treasurer, the State Engineer, two judges of the New York Court of Appeals, a Canal Commissioner and an Inspector of State Prisons, as well as members of the New York State Assembly and the New York State Senate.

== Nominations ==
Both the Whig state convention and the Anti-Nebraska state convention met on September 26 at Syracuse, New York. John Alsop King presided at the Whig convention, Reuben E. Fenton at the Anti-Nebraska convention. After organizing the Whigs, the delegates decided to join the Anti-Nebraskans, and marched to their assembling place. There the two parties merged and adopted the name Republican Party, and continued as the Republican state convention with King and Fenton as co-chairmen.

== Results ==
Due to the chaotic political situation with the major parties split over the slavery question, a new party being founded by the fusion of factions of all previous parties, and four tickets competing, the American Party had the most surprising election victory in the history of the State of New York, winning eight of the nine state offices. Only the jointly nominated Democrat Henry L. Selden could defeat his American and Republican opponents. The incumbents Cook, Follett and Darius Clark were defeated.

16 Republicans, 11 Americans, four Democrats and one Temperance man were elected to a two-year term (1856–57) in the New York State Senate.

47 Democrats, 44 Americans, 35 Republicans and 2 Whigs were elected to the New York State Assembly of the 79th New York State Legislature.

1855 state election results
Office	American ticket		Republican ticket		Dem./Soft ticket		Dem./Hard ticket		Liberty ticket
Secretary of State	Joel T. Headley	148,557	Preston King	136,698	Israel T. Hatch	91,336	Aaron Ward	59,353	Frederick Douglass
Comptroller	Lorenzo Burrows	148,267	James M. Cook	138,748	Lemuel Stetson	101,863	Thomas B. Mitchell	47,411	Lewis Tappan
Attorney General	Stephen B. Cushing	148,695	Abijah Mann, Jr.	136,337	Samuel J. Tilden	101,369	Josiah Sutherland	44,357	George Boyer Vashon
Treasurer	Stephen Clark	148,778	Alexander B. Williams	136,696	Ariel S. Thurston	91,871	Joseph M. Lyon	57,910	James C. Delong
State Engineer	Silas Seymour	137,608	George Geddes	131,716	John B. Jervis	88,290	John D. Fay	56,293	William W. Chapman
Judge of the Court of Appeals (full term)	William W. Campbell	141,514	Bradford R. Wood	134,353	Samuel L. Selden	151,632	Samuel L. Selden		Beriah Green
Judge of the Court of Appeals (short term)	George F. Comstock	140,299	Joseph Mullin	132,019	Nicholas Hill, Jr.	106,511	John Willard	40,772	William Goodell
Canal Commissioner	Samuel S. Whallon	147,461	Daniel H. Bissell	135,918	Curtis Hawley	90,005	Frederick Follett	60,974	Hugh Smith
Inspector of State Prisons	William A. Russell	148,875	Wesley Bailey	136,993	Patrick H. Agan	100,702	Darius Clark	48,332	George W. Clark

== Sources ==
- Result in The Official State Canvass in NYT on December 17, 1855 ("not fully completed", but released for publication, without the scattering votes)
- American Party ticket, in NYT on October 18, 1855
- The Republican ticket, in NYT on November 5, 1855
- Results in The Tribune Almanac 1856

== See also ==
- New York state elections
