= Roderick White =

American politician

Roderick White (June 23, 1814 in Springville, then in Niagara Co., now in Erie County, New York – May 26, 1856 in Olean, Cattaraugus County, New York) was an American lawyer and politician from New York.

== Life ==
He was the son of Francis White (1782–1858) and Emma/Amy (Rushmore) White (b. 1787). He married Sarah Nichols (1822–1883), and they had six children.

He was a Whig member of the New York State Assembly (Cattaraugus Co.) in 1845.

He was a Republican member of the New York State Senate (32nd D.) in 1856 and died shortly after the end of the session.

He was buried at the Mount View Cemetery in Olean.

== Sources ==
- The New York Civil List compiled by Franklin Benjamin Hough (pages 137, 147, 230 and 316; Weed, Parsons and Co., 1858)
- His wife's death notice, transcribed from the Olean Democrat (May 15, 1883), at RootsWeb
- White genealogy at Family Tree Maker

New York State Senate
Preceded by Alvah H. Walker	New York State Senate; 32nd District; 1856	Succeeded by John P. Darling
