= 79th New York State Legislature =

New York state legislative session

←	78th	80th	→
- The Old State Capitol (1879)

Overview
- Legislative body: New York State Legislature
- Jurisdiction: New York, United States
- Term: January 1 – December 31, 1856

Senate
- Members: 32
- President: Lt. Gov. Henry J. Raymond (W)
- Temporary President: Alonzo S. Upham (R), from January 29
- Party control: Republican plurality (16-12-4)

Assembly
- Members: 128
- Speaker: Orville Robinson (D)
- Party control: Democratic plurality (47-44-35-2)

Sessions
- 1st: January 1 – April 9, 1856

The 79th New York State Legislature, consisting of the New York State Senate and the New York State Assembly, met from January 1 to April 9, 1856, during the second year of Myron H. Clark's governorship, in Albany.

== Background ==
Under the provisions of the New York Constitution of 1846, 32 Senators were elected in single-seat senatorial districts for a two-year term, the whole Senate being renewed biennially. The senatorial districts (except those in New York City) were made up of entire counties. 128 Assemblymen were elected in single-seat districts to a one-year term, the whole Assembly being renewed annually. The Assembly districts were made up of entire towns, or city wards, forming a contiguous area, all in the same county. The City and County of New York was divided into four senatorial districts, and 16 Assembly districts.

At this time there the Democratic Party was split into two factions: the Hard-Shells (or Hards) and the Soft-Shells (or Softs). In 1848, the Democratic Party had been split into Barnburners and Hunkers. The Barnburners left the party, and ran as the Free Soil Party, with presidential candidate Martin Van Buren. Afterwards the larger part of the Free Soilers re-joined the Democratic Party. During the following years, the Hunkers split over the question of reconciliation with the Barnburners. The Hards were against it, denying the Barnburners to gain influence in the Party. The Softs favored reconciliation with the intention of maintaining enough strength to win the elections. Both Hards and Softs favored a compromise on the slavery question: to maintain the status quo and to leave the decision to the local population in new Territories or States if they want slavery or not, as expressed in the Kansas-Nebraska Act.

The anti-slavery faction of the Whig Party, the "Free Democrats" (former Barnburners and Free Soilers), and the short-lived Anti-Nebraska Party merged into the Republican Party.

Most of the Whigs which favored a compromise, or preferred to sidestep the issue, joined with parts of the Democratic factions the Know Nothing movement which ran in the election as the "American Party."

== Elections ==
The 1855 New York state election was held on November 6. Due to the re-alignment of political parties, the whole American Party ticket of State officers was elected. The approximate party strength at this election, as expressed by the vote on Secretary of State was: American 148,000; Republican 137,000; Soft 91,000; and Hard 59,000.

== Sessions ==
The Legislature met for the regular session at the Old State Capitol in Albany on January 1, 1856; and adjourned on April 9.

On January 16, after two weeks of deadlock, Orville Robinson (D) was elected Speaker on the 49th ballot.

1856 Speaker election result
Ballot	Date	Lyman Odell Amer.	Henry A. Prendergast Rep.	Benjamin Bailey Dem.	Timothy Hoyle Dem.	Orville Robinson Dem.	also ran
1st	Jan. 1	41	35	27	7	3	Scott 3, Fowler 2, J. B. Clark, Lafever
2nd	Jan. 1	40	35	28	6	5	Scott 3, Fowler 2, J. B. Clark, Lafever, Spraker
3rd	Jan. 1	40	35	30	6	3	Scott 3, Fowler 2, J. B. Clark, Lafever, Spraker
4th	Jan. 2	40	35	27	9	4	Scott 3, Fowler 2, Gray, Lafever
5th	Jan. 2	41	34	28	9	4	Scott 3, Fowler, Gray, Lafever
6th	Jan. 2	41	34	27	9	4	Scott 3, Fowler 2, Lafever, Van Santvoord
7th	Jan. 2	41	34	27	9	4	Fowler 2, Scott 2, Gray, Lafever, Van Santvoord
8th	Jan. 2	41	35	27	9	4	Scott 3, Fowler 2, Gray, Lafever, Van Santvoord
9th	Jan. 3	39	35	27	8	5	Scott 4, Fowler 3, Gray, Lafever
10th	Jan. 3	40	35	28	9	5	Scott 4, Fowler 2, Lafever
11th	Jan. 3	41	35	28	9	5	Scott 4, Fowler 3, Lafever
12th	Jan. 3	41	34	26	10	5	Scott 4, Fowler 3, Lafever
13th	Jan. 4	41	35	25	10	5	Scott 4, Fowler 2, Lafever
14th	Jan. 4	40	34	25	10	5	Scott 4, Fowler 2, Lafever
15th	Jan. 4	40	35	25	10	5	Scott 4, Fowler 2, Lafever
16th	Jan. 4	39	35	25	10	5	Scott 5, Fowler 2, Lafever
17th	Jan. 4	39	35	25	10	5	Scott 4, Fowler 2, Lafever, Wakeman
18th	Jan. 4	39	35	25	10	5	Scott 4, Fowler 2, Lafever
19th	Jan. 4	40	34	25	10	5	Scott 4, Fowler 2, Lafever
20th	Jan. 8	36	34	26	8	5	Fowler 2, Lafever, Scott
21st	Jan. 8	38	34	27	8	5	Fowler 2, Lafever, Scott
22nd	Jan. 8	38	34	27	8	5	Fowler 2, Scott 2, Lafever
23rd	Jan. 8	38	34	27	8	5	Fowler 2, Scott 2, Lafever
24th	Jan. 8	38	34	26	8	5	Fowler 2, Scott 2, Lafever
25th	Jan. 9	40	35	27	7	5	Fowler 2, Scott 2, Lafever
26th	Jan. 9	43	35	27	8	5	Lafever, Fowler, Scott
27th	Jan. 9	43	34	27	6	5	Lafever, Fowler, Scott
28th	Jan. 9	43	35	26	7	6	Fowler 2, Lafever, Scott
29th	Jan. 9	43	31	26	7	6	Fowler 2, Lafever, Scott
30th	Jan. 9	43	35	28	7	5	Fowler, Lafever, Scott
31st	Jan. 9	43	34	28	7	5	Fowler, Lafever, Scott
32nd	Jan. 9	43	35	26	7	5	Fowler, Lafever, Scott
33rd	Jan. 10	43	35	28	7	5	Lafever, Scott
34th	Jan. 10	44	35	29	7	5	Scott
35th	Jan. 10	45	35	29	6	6	Lafever, Scott
36th	Jan. 10	44	35	29	6	5	Scott 2, Lafever
37th	Jan. 10	44	34	28	6	5	Lafever, Scott
38th	Jan. 11	42	35	26	6	5	Fowler, Lafever, Scott
39th	Jan. 11	44	34	26	6	5	Scott 3, Fowler, Lafever, Van Santvoord
40th	Jan. 11	43	35	22	4	3	Scott 3, Fowler, Lafever, Van Santvoord
41st	Jan. 11	43	35	25	6	5	Scott 2, Fowler, Lafever, Van Santvoord
42nd	Jan. 11	44	35	25	7	4	Scott 3, Fowler, Lafever, Van Santvoord
43rd	Jan. 11	44	35	25	6	4	Scott 3, Fowler, Lafever, Van Santvoord
44th	Jan. 11	45	34	25	6	4	Scott 3, Fowler, Lafever, Van Santvoord
45th	Jan. 12	45	34	27	5	5	Scott 3, Lafever, Van Santvoord
46th	Jan. 16	44	35	1		24	Glover 11, Bradner 4, Anthon, Fowler, Lafever, Hayes, Van Santvoord
47th	Jan. 16	45	35	1		30	Glover 8, Bradner, Fowler, Hayes, Lafever
48th	Jan. 16	46	1	1		59	Glover 10, Foot 3, Fowler, Hayes, Lafever, Squire
49th	Jan. 16	45		1		63	Glover 9, Foot 4, Deshler 2, Squire

On January 29, Alonzo S. Upham (R) was elected president pro tempore of the State Senate.

== State Senate ==
=== Districts ===
- 1st District: Queens, Richmond and Suffolk counties
- 2nd District: Kings County
- 3rd District: 1st, 2nd, 3rd, 4th, 5th and 6th wards of New York City
- 4th District: 7th, 10th, 13th and 17th wards of New York City
- 5th District: 8th, 9th and 14th wards of New York City
- 6th District: 11th, 12th, 15th, 16th, 18th, 19th, 20th, 21st and 22nd wards of New York City
- 7th District: Putnam, Rockland and Westchester counties
- 8th District: Columbia and Dutchess counties
- 9th District: Orange and Sullivan counties
- 10th District: Greene and Ulster counties
- 11th District: Albany and Schenectady counties
- 12th District: Rensselaer County
- 13th District: Saratoga and Washington counties
- 14th District: Clinton, Essex and Warren counties
- 15th District: Franklin and St. Lawrence counties
- 16th District: Fulton, Hamilton, Herkimer and Montgomery counties
- 17th District: Delaware and Schoharie counties
- 18th District: Chenango and Otsego counties
- 19th District: Oneida County
- 20th District: Madison and Oswego counties
- 21st District: Jefferson and Lewis counties
- 22nd District: Onondaga County
- 23rd District: Broome, Cortland and Tioga counties
- 24th District: Cayuga and Wayne counties
- 25th District: Seneca, Tompkins and Yates counties
- 26th District: Chemung and Steuben counties
- 27th District: Monroe County
- 28th District: Genesee, Niagara and Orleans counties
- 29th District: Livingston and Ontario counties
- 30th District: Allegany and Wyoming counties
- 31st District: Erie County
- 32nd District: Cattaraugus and Chautauqua counties
Note: There are now 62 counties in the State of New York. The counties which are not mentioned in this list had not yet been established, or sufficiently organized, the area being included in one or more of the abovementioned counties.

=== Members ===
The asterisk (*) denotes members of the previous Legislature who continued in office as members of this Legislature. Mark Spencer, Erastus Brooks, Zenas Clark and George W. Bradford were re-elected. James Rider, Joseph H. Petty, John W. Ferdon, Justin A. Smith and Joseph H. Ramsey changed from the Assembly to the Senate.

Party affiliations follow the vote on Senate and State officers.

District	Senator	Party	Notes
1st	James Rider*	Republican	
2nd	Cyrus P. Smith	American	
3rd	Daniel E. Sickles	Dem.-Soft	contested by Thomas J. Barr (Dem.-Hard); on November 4, 1856, elected to the 35th U.S. Congress
4th	Joseph H. Petty*	American	
5th	Mark Spencer*	Dem.-Soft	
6th	Erastus Brooks*	American	
7th	John W. Ferdon*	American	unsuccessfully contested by Benjamin Brandreth (Dem.)
8th	William Kelly	Democrat	
9th	Edward M. Madden	Republican	
10th	George S. Nichols	American	
11th	John W. Harcourt	American	
12th	Amos Briggs	American	
13th	Justin A. Smith*	American	
14th	William Hotchkiss	American	
15th	Zenas Clark*	Republican	
16th	Frederick P. Bellinger	Republican	
17th	Joseph H. Ramsey*	Republican	
18th	Addison M. Smith	American	
19th	Eaton J. Richardson	Republican	
20th	M. Lindley Lee	Republican	
21st	Gardner Towne	Republican	
22nd	James Noxon	Republican	
23rd	George W. Bradford*	Republican	
24th	Samuel C. Cuyler	Republican	
25th	James Huntington	Republican	
26th	John K. Hale	American	
27th	John E. Paterson	Republican	
28th	Alonzo S. Upham	Republican	on January 29, elected president pro tempore
29th	Sidney Sweet	American	
30th	John B. Halsted	Republican	
31st	James Wadsworth	Democrat	
32nd	Roderick White	Republican	died on May 26, 1856

=== Employees ===
- Clerk: Samuel P. Allen
- Sergeant-at-Arms: Samuel R. Tuell
- Assistant Sergeant-at-Arms: George W. Bedell
- Doorkeeper: William Coppernall
- Assistant Doorkeeper: Henry W. Shipman
- Second Assistant Doorkeeper: Victor M. Dearborn

== State Assembly ==
=== Assemblymen ===
The asterisk (*) denotes members of the previous Legislature who continued as members of this Legislature.

Party affiliations follow the vote on Speaker.

District		Assemblymen	Party	Notes
Albany	1st	Isaac Witbeck	Democrat	
Albany	2nd	Jackson King	American	
Albany	3rd	Henry Jenkins	American	
Albany	4th	James Brady	Democrat	
Allegany	1st	Isaac Hampton	Republican	
Allegany	2nd	Alexander H. Main	Republican	
Broome		Walter L. Peck	Republican	
Cattaraugus	1st	Lorenzo D. Cobb	Republican	
Cattaraugus	2nd	Daniel Bucklin	American	
Cayuga	1st	Sardis Dudley	American	
Cayuga	2nd	Leonard Simons	American	
Cayuga	3rd	Tolbert Powers	Republican	
Chautauqua	1st	Henry A. Prendergast	Republican	
Chautauqua	2nd	Smith Berry	American	
Chemung		Jefferson B. Clark	Democrat	
Chenango	1st	Tompkins H. Matteson	Democrat	
Chenango	2nd	Frederick Juliand	Republican	
Clinton		Timothy Hoyle	Democrat	
Columbia	1st	Samuel Ten Broeck	American	
Columbia	2nd	Adam A. Hoysradt	American	
Cortland		George I. Kingman	Republican	
Delaware	1st	John Mead	Republican	
Delaware	2nd	John Haxtun	American	
Dutchess	1st	John H. Ketcham	Republican	
Dutchess	2nd	Daniel O. Ward	Democrat	
Dutchess	3rd	Jacob B. Carpenter	Republican	
Erie	1st	John G. Deshler	American	
Erie	2nd	Daniel Devening Jr.*	Democrat	
Erie	3rd	John Clark	American	
Erie	4th	Benjamin Maltby	Republican	
Essex		John A. Lee	American	
Franklin		Albert Hobbs	American	
Fulton and Hamilton		Isaac Lafever	Whig	
Genesee	1st	Seth Wakeman	Republican	
Genesee	2nd	David Mallory*	Republican	
Greene	1st	Buel Maben	American	
Greene	2nd	Manly B. Mattice	American	
Herkimer	1st	Samuel Green	Republican	
Herkimer	2nd	Amos H. Prescott	American	
Jefferson	1st	Hart Massey	Republican	
Jefferson	2nd	Franklin Parker	Democrat	
Jefferson	3rd	Isaac Wells	Democrat	died on April 8, 1856
Kings	1st	John Hanford	Democrat	
Kings	2nd	Francis B. Spinola	Democrat	
Kings	3rd	Edward T. Wood	American	
Lewis		David Algur	Republican	
Livingston	1st	Lyman Odell*	American	
Livingston	2nd	Alonzo Bradner	Democrat	
Madison	1st	Samuel White	Democrat	
Madison	2nd	John Snow	Republican	
Monroe	1st	Benjamin Smith*	Republican	
Monroe	2nd	Eliphaz Trimmer	Democrat	
Monroe	3rd	Joseph Dewey	Republican	
Montgomery	1st	John Van Derveer	Republican	
Montgomery	2nd	Joseph Spraker	Democrat	
New York	1st	Daniel Mahen	Democrat	
New York	2nd	Benjamin Ray	Democrat	
New York	3rd	James Hayes	Democrat	
New York	4th	John D. Dixon*	Democrat	
New York	5th	John J. Reilly	Democrat	
New York	6th	Augustine J. H. Duganne	American	
New York	7th	Samuel Brevoort	American	
New York	8th	James A. Dolan	American	
New York	9th	Erastus W. Glover	Democrat	
New York	10th	John M. Reed	American	
New York	11th	Charles T. Mills	American	
New York	12th	Peter Dawson	Democrat	
New York	13th	William A. Guest	American	
New York	14th	Henry Wiltse	Democrat	
New York	15th	Arthur Woods	Democrat	
New York	16th	John H. Anthon	Democrat	
Niagara	1st	William S. Fenn	American	
Niagara	2nd	John Gould	Republican	
Oneida	1st	George F. Fowler	Whig	
Oneida	2nd	James J. Hanchett	Democrat	
Oneida	3rd	Thomas D. Penfield	Democrat	
Oneida	4th	Caleb Goodrich	Democrat	
Onondaga	1st	Irvin Williams	Republican	
Onondaga	2nd	James Longstreet	Republican	
Onondaga	3rd	Burr Burton	Republican	
Onondaga	4th	Jabez Lewis	American	
Ontario	1st	Samuel A. Foot	Republican	
Ontario	2nd	Oliver Case*	American	
Orange	1st	Isaac Wood	American	
Orange	2nd	William W. Reeve	Democrat	
Orange	3rd	Andrew J. Mills	Democrat	
Orleans		Dan H. Cole	Republican	
Oswego	1st	Orville Robinson	Democrat	elected Speaker
Oswego	2nd	Andrew S. Warner*	Republican	
Otsego	1st	Timothy D. Bailey	American	
Otsego	2nd	Brown Dimock	Democrat	
Otsego	3rd	Elihu C. Wright	Democrat	
Putnam		Benjamin Bailey	Democrat	
Queens		Seaman N. Snedeker	American	
Rensselaer	1st	George Van Santvoord	Democrat	
Rensselaer	2nd	Augustus Johnson	American	
Rensselaer	3rd	Sanford A. Tracy	American	
Richmond		William J. Shea	Democrat	
Rockland		Edward Whritenour	American	
St. Lawrence	1st	Emory W. Abbott	Republican	
St. Lawrence	2nd	Benjamin Squire	Republican	
St. Lawrence	3rd	Daniel P. Rose Jr.	Republican	
Saratoga	1st	George G. Scott	Democrat	
Saratoga	2nd	Joseph Baucus	Democrat	
Schenectady		James Rodgers	American	
Schoharie	1st	John Lovett	Democrat	
Schoharie	2nd	Charles Holmes	Democrat	
Seneca		James B. Thomas	American	
Steuben	1st	Goldsmith Denniston	American	
Steuben	2nd	Albert C. Morgan	Democrat	
Steuben	3rd	Harlow Hakes	American	
Suffolk	1st	David G. Floyd	Democrat	
Suffolk	2nd	William Sidney Smith	Democrat	
Sullivan		William H. Buckley*	American	
Tioga		Abram H. Miller	Democrat	
Tompkins	1st	William C. Coon	American	
Tompkins	2nd	Robert H. S. Hyde	American	
Ulster	1st	George A. Dudley	American	
Ulster	2nd	Daniel Schoonmaker	American	
Warren		Thomas S. Gray	Democrat	
Washington	1st	John S. Crocker	American	
Washington	2nd	Henry B. Northup	American	
Wayne	1st	Harlow Hyde	Republican	
Wayne	2nd	Thomas Barnes	Republican	
Westchester	1st	Abraham R. Strang	Democrat	
Westchester	2nd	Eli Curtis	Democrat	
Wyoming		John C. Paine*	Republican	
Yates		Henry H. Gage	Republican	

=== Employees ===
- Clerk: Richard U. Sherman
- Sergeant-at-Arms: George B. Woolbridge
- Doorkeeper: Sherman McLean
- First Assistant Doorkeeper: John Davies
- Second Assistant Doorkeeper: Henry White

== Sources ==
- The New York Civil List compiled by Franklin Benjamin Hough (Weed, Parsons and Co., 1858) [pg. 109 for Senate districts; pg. 137 for senators; pg. 148–157 for Assembly districts; pg. 250ff for assemblymen]
- Journal of the Senate (79th Session) (1856)
- Journal of the Assembly (79th Session) (1856)
