= John B. Halsted =

American politician

John Halsted

Member of the New York State Senate from the 30th district
- In office 1856–1859
- Preceded by: Martin Butts
- Succeeded by: David H. Abell

Personal details
- Born: November 7, 1798 Pittston Township, Pennsylvania
- Died: Unknown
- Party: Republican
- Other political affiliations: Whig

John B. Halsted (November 7, 1798 – unknown) was an American merchant and politician from New York who served as a member of the New York State Senate from 1856 to 1859.

== Background ==
Halstead was born in Pittston Township, Pennsylvania in 1798. His parents removed in 1795 from Orange County, New York to Pittston, and returned in 1817 to New York, settling in Ontario County.

He attended the common district school, and then taught school during the winter, and became a carpenter and joiner. Around 1822, he began the study of medicine, but abandoned this after a short time and became a merchant. In 1827, he moved to Castile, New York. On October 26, 1832, he married Eunice Talcott (b. 1807).

Halsted was a Whig, and joined the Republican Party upon its foundation in 1855. He was a member of the New York State Senate from 1856 to 1859, sitting in the 79th, 80th, 81st and 82nd New York State Legislature, and was elected President pro tempore of the State Senate in 1858 (81st Session). He was Collector of Internal Revenue for New York's 29th District, appointed by President Abraham Lincoln.

== Sources ==
- The New York Civil List compiled by Franklin Benjamin Hough, Stephen C. Hutchins and Edgar Albert Werner (1867; pg. 442)
- Biographical Sketches of the State Officers and Members of the Legislature of the State of New York in 1859 by William D. Murray (pg. 56ff)
- The National Almanac (1863; pg. 130)

New York State Senate
Preceded by Martin Butts	New York State Senate; 30th District; 1856–1859	Succeeded by David H. Abell
