= Mark Spencer (New York politician) =

American politician

Mark Spencer (July 5, 1787 – January 28, 1859) was an American merchant and politician from New York.

== Life ==
He was the son of Mark Spencer (1738–1815) and Huldah Parmelee (Collins) Spencer.

He was a member of the New York State Senate (5th D.) from 1854 to 1857, sitting in the 77th, 78th, 79th and 80th New York State Legislatures. On January 24, 1857, he was elected President pro tempore of the State Senate.

== Sources ==
- The New York Civil List compiled by Franklin Benjamin Hough (pages 137 and 145; Weed, Parsons and Co., 1858)
- Pen and Ink Portraits of the Senators, Assemblymen, and State Officers of New York by G. W. Bungay (1857; pg. 61)
- LAW REPORTS; SURROGATE's COURT; WILLS OFFERED FOR PROBATE in NYT on February 4, 1859
- Mark Spencer at Ancestry.com

New York State Senate
Preceded by James W. Beekman	New York State Senate; 5th District; 1854–1857	Succeeded by Smith Ely, Jr.
