= Joseph H. Petty =

American politician

Joseph Henry Petty (August 20, 1826 New York City – February 9, 1901 Amityville, Suffolk County, New York) was an American politician from New York.

== Life ==
He was the son of Ezekiel Petty (1789–1853) and Elizabeth Petty (1791–1874). About 1853, he married Catharine Van Buren (ca. 1834–ca. 1919), and they had three children.

He was a member of the New York State Assembly (New York Co., 11th D.) in 1855.

He was a member of the New York State Senate (4th D.) in 1856 and 1857.

He joined the New York Metropolitan Police, and retired as a captain. He was commended for bravery during the New York City draft riots of 1863, and the Orange Riots of 1873.

He was buried at the Oakwood Cemetery in Amityville.

== Sources ==
- The New York Civil List compiled by Franklin Benjamin Hough (pages 137, 144, 249 and 297; Weed, Parsons and Co., 1858)
- DEATH LIST OF A DAY; Joseph H. Petty in NYT on February 10, 1901
- Petty genealogy at Long Island Surnames

New York State Assembly
Preceded by James M. Boyd	New York State Assembly; New York County, 11th District; 1855	Succeeded by Charles T. Mills
New York State Senate
Preceded by Thomas R. Whitney	New York State Senate; 4th District; 1856–1857	Succeeded by John C. Mather
