= Justin A. Smith =

American politician

Justin A. Smith (March 20, 1818 in Whitehall, Washington County, New York – December 30, 1879) was an American politician from New York.

== Life ==
He married Eliza Ann Wainwright (1819–1891), and they had three children.

About 1844, he was Inspector of Boats on the Canals, at Whitehall. In 1849, he was employed by the Saratoga and Whitehall Railroad Company.

He was a member of the New York State Assembly (Washington Co., 2nd D.) in 1855.

He was a member of the New York State Senate (13th D.) in 1856 and 1857.

He and his wife were buried at the Boardman Cemetery in Whitehall.

== Sources ==
- The New York Civil List compiled by Franklin Benjamin Hough (pages 137, 145, 249 and 297; Weed, Parsons and Co., 1858)
- The New York State Register (1843; pg. 329)
- The New York State Register (1845; pg. 357)
- Pen and Ink Portraits of the Senators, Assemblymen, and State Officers of New York by G. W. Bungay (1857; pg. 61)

New York State Assembly
Preceded by George W. Thorn	New York State Assembly; Washington County, 2nd District; 1855	Succeeded by Henry B. Northup
New York State Senate
Preceded by James C. Hopkins	New York State Senate; 13th District; 1856–1857	Succeeded by George Y. Johnson
