= Zenas Clark =

American politician

Zenas Clark (1795–1864) was an American politician from New York.

== Life ==
In 1816, he co-founded the first newspaper in Potsdam, the Potsdam Gazette.

He was Supervisor of the Town of Potsdam from 1830 to 1834.

He was a member of the New York State Assembly (St. Lawrence Co.) in 1840 and 1841.

He was a member of the New York State Senate (15th D.) from 1854 to 1857, sitting in the 77th, 78th, 79th and 80th New York State Legislatures. He resigned his seat on February 13, 1857, due to ill health.

He was buried at the Bayside Cemetery in Potsdam.

== Sources ==
- The New York Civil List compiled by Franklin Benjamin Hough (pages 137, 139, 224f and 265; Weed, Parsons and Co., 1858)
- History of Potsdam transcribed from Our County and Its people: St. Lawrence County, New York by Gates Curtis (1894), at Ray's Place

New York State Senate
Preceded by Henry B. Smith	New York State Senate; 15th District; 1854–1857	Succeeded by Bloomfield Usher
