= Joel T. Headley =

American politician (1813–1897)

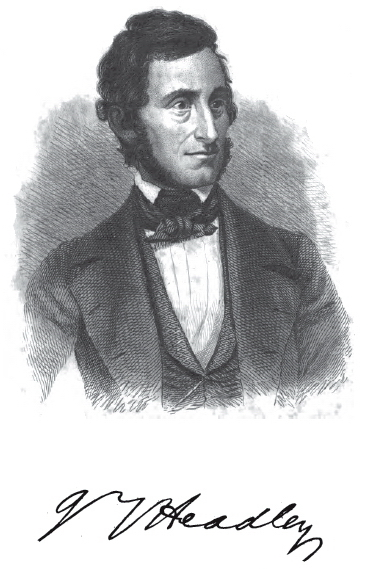
- Born: December 30th, 1814; Walton, New York, U.S.
- Died: January 16th, 1897 (aged 82); Newburgh, New York, U.S.
- Education: Union College, Auburn Theological Seminary
- Occupations: Historian, writer, politician, adventurer
- Years active: 1844 - 1890
- Political party: American Party
- Spouse: Anna Allston Russel (m. 1850)
- Children: Russel, Lucy, Joel Tyler

Joel Tyler Headley (December 30, 1813 – January 16, 1897) was an American clergyman, historian, author, newspaper editor, adventurer and politician who served as Secretary of State of New York. Headley belonged to the American Party.

== Life ==
He was born at Walton, New York to Isaac Headley, a Presbyterian clergyman, and Irene Benedict Headley. Headley first planned to study law, but after graduating from Union College in 1839, he took a course in theology at the Auburn Theological Seminary in Auburn, New York. After being ordained, he preached at Stockbridge, Massachusetts, but soon had to give up his profession due to the strain, going to Europe in 1842. He turned to history writing, producing many works on various subjects. His writings were among the first to call attention to the Adirondack Mountains as a health resort. He later accepted the solicitations of Horace Greeley and became associate editor of the New York Tribune.

Headley selected Newburgh, New York as his country seat; its close proximity to New York City and upstate New York was appealing. Outside of the city boundary, in the mostly rural town of New Windsor, Headley purchased approximately 13 acres of land in the summer of 1850. The property, overlooking the Hudson River, formerly belonged to the Chrystie family. In Newburgh, Headley selected the architectural firm of Andrew Jackson Downing and Calvert Vaux to build his home. Though he could afford a much grander house, he decided to subdue tastes and preferred the focal point of the property to be its natural surroundings rather than the house itself. Downing and Vaux set to work on the "villa," including the design in a later edition of Downing's Cottage Residences, Design No. 14, "A Cottage in the Rhine style".

Headley was a member of the New York State Assembly (Orange Co., 1st D.) in 1855; and was New York Secretary of State from 1856 to 1857, elected on the American Party ticket at the 1855 New York state election. He died in Newburgh, New York in 1897, having lived there for many years.

== Bibliography ==
- Headley, Joel Tyler (1844). Italy and the Italians, in a Series of Letters. New York: I.S. Platt.
- Headley, Joel Tyler (1845). Letters From Italy. New York: Wiley and Putnam.
- Headley, Joel Tyler (1845). The Alps and the Rhine; A Series of Sketches. Wiley and Putnam.
- Headley, Joel Tyler (1846). Napoleon and His Marshals. New York: Baker and Scribner.
- Headley, Joel Tyler (1847). The Sacred Mountains. New York: Baker and Scribner.
- Headley, Joel Tyler (1848). The Life of Oliver Cromwell. New York: Baker and Scribner.
- Headley, Joel Tyler (1847). Washington and His Generals. New York: Baker and Scribner.
- Headley, Joel Tyler (1849). Sacred Scenes and Characters. New York: Baker and Scribner.
- Headley, Joel Tyler (1849). The Adirondack; or Life in the Woods. New York: Baker and Scribner.
- Headley, Joel Tyler (1850). Letters from the Backwoods and The Adirondac. New York: John S. Taylor.
- Headley, Joel Tyler (1850). History of the Persecutions and Battles of the Waldenses. New York: John S. Taylor.
- Headley, Joel Tyler (1850). The Power of Beauty. New York: John S. Taylor.
- Headley, Joel Tyler (1850). Miscellanies. New York: Baker and Scribner.
- Headley, Joel Tyler (1850). The Distinguished Marshals of Napoleon. New York: John S. Taylor.
- Headley, Joel Tyler (1852). The Lives of Winfield Scott and Andrew Jackson. New York: Charles Scribner.
- Headley, Joel Tyler (1853). The Second War with England. New York: Charles Scribner.
- Headley, Joel Tyler (1855). The Life of George Washington. New York: Charles Scribner.
- Headley, Joel Tyler (1858). The Illustrated Life of Washington. New York: G. & F. Bill.
- Headley, Joel Tyler (1861). The Chaplains and Clergy of the Revolution. Springfield, Mass.: G. & F. Bill.
- Headley, Joel Tyler (1865). Grant and Sherman; Their Campaigns and Generals. New York: E.B. Treat & Co.
- Headley, Joel Tyler (1866). The Great Rebellion; A History of the Civil War in the United States. Hartford, Conn.: Hurlbut, Williams and Company; American Publishing Company.
- Headley, Joel Tyler (1867). Farragut and Our Naval Commanders. New York: E.B. Treat & Co.
- Headley, Joel Tyler (1873). The Great Riots of New York, 1712 to 1873. New York: E. B. Treat.
- Headley, Joel Tyler (1879). The Life and Travels of General Grant. Philadelphia, PA: Hubbard Bros.
- Headley, Joel Tyler (1885). The Life of Ulysses S. Grant. New York: E.B. Treat & Co.; The Perkins Book Company.

== Wikisource Links ==
- including a photo, signature, & his works listed.
- United States Navy Darien Exploring Expedition of the Isthmus of Panama 1854

Political offices
Preceded by Elias W. Leavenworth	New York Secretary of State; 1856 - 1857	Succeeded by Gideon J. Tucker
