= Preston King (politician) =

American politician (1806–1865)

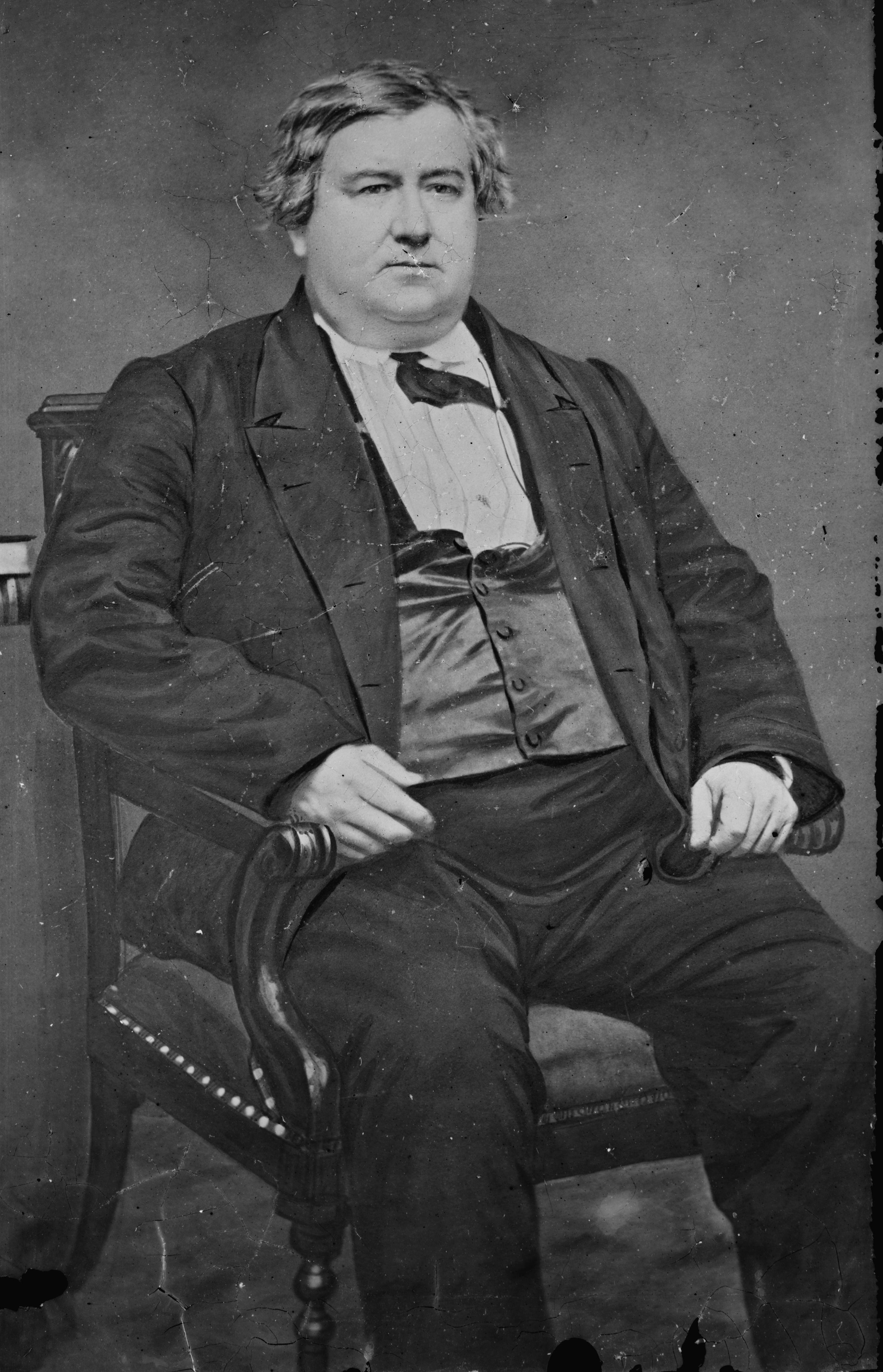
- Photograph of King by Mathew Brady, c. 1855–1865.

United States Senator from New York
- In office March 4, 1857 – March 3, 1863
- Preceded by: Hamilton Fish
- Succeeded by: Edwin D. Morgan

Member of the U.S. House of Representatives from New York's 18th district
- In office March 4, 1843 – March 3, 1847
- Preceded by: Thomas C. Chittenden
- Succeeded by: William Collins
- In office March 4, 1849 – March 3, 1853
- Preceded by: William Collins
- Succeeded by: Peter Rowe

Member of the New York State Assembly from St. Lawrence County
- In office January 1, 1835 – December 31, 1838

Personal details
- Born: October 14, 1806 Ogdensburg, New York
- Died: November 12, 1865 (aged 59) New York Harbor, New York City, New York
- Party: Democrat (1830–1847); Free Soil (1847–1853); Republican (1855–1863)

Preston King (October 14, 1806 – November 12, 1865) was an American attorney and politician who represented New York in the United States Senate from 1857 to 1863. King also represented the North Country in the U.S. House of Representatives for three terms and represented his native St. Lawrence County in the New York State Assembly for four terms. King entered politics as an ally of Martin Van Buren and was a lifelong opponent of slavery as a member of the Democratic, Free Soil, and Republican parties.

On November 12, 1865, King drowned himself in New York Harbor while serving as Collector of the Port of New York. He was appointed to that highly influential patronage position by his close friend and political ally, President Andrew Johnson, in an effort to unify support for Johnson's presidency and reduce corruption but despaired of success.

== Early life ==
King was born in Ogdensburg, New York on October 14, 1806. He was the illegitimate son of John King and Margaret Galloway. At an early age, he was committed to the guardianship of Louis Hasbrouck, an Ogdensburg lawyer.

He pursued classical studies and graduated from Union College in 1827, where he was an early member of Kappa Alpha Society. He studied law and was admitted to the bar.

== Career ==
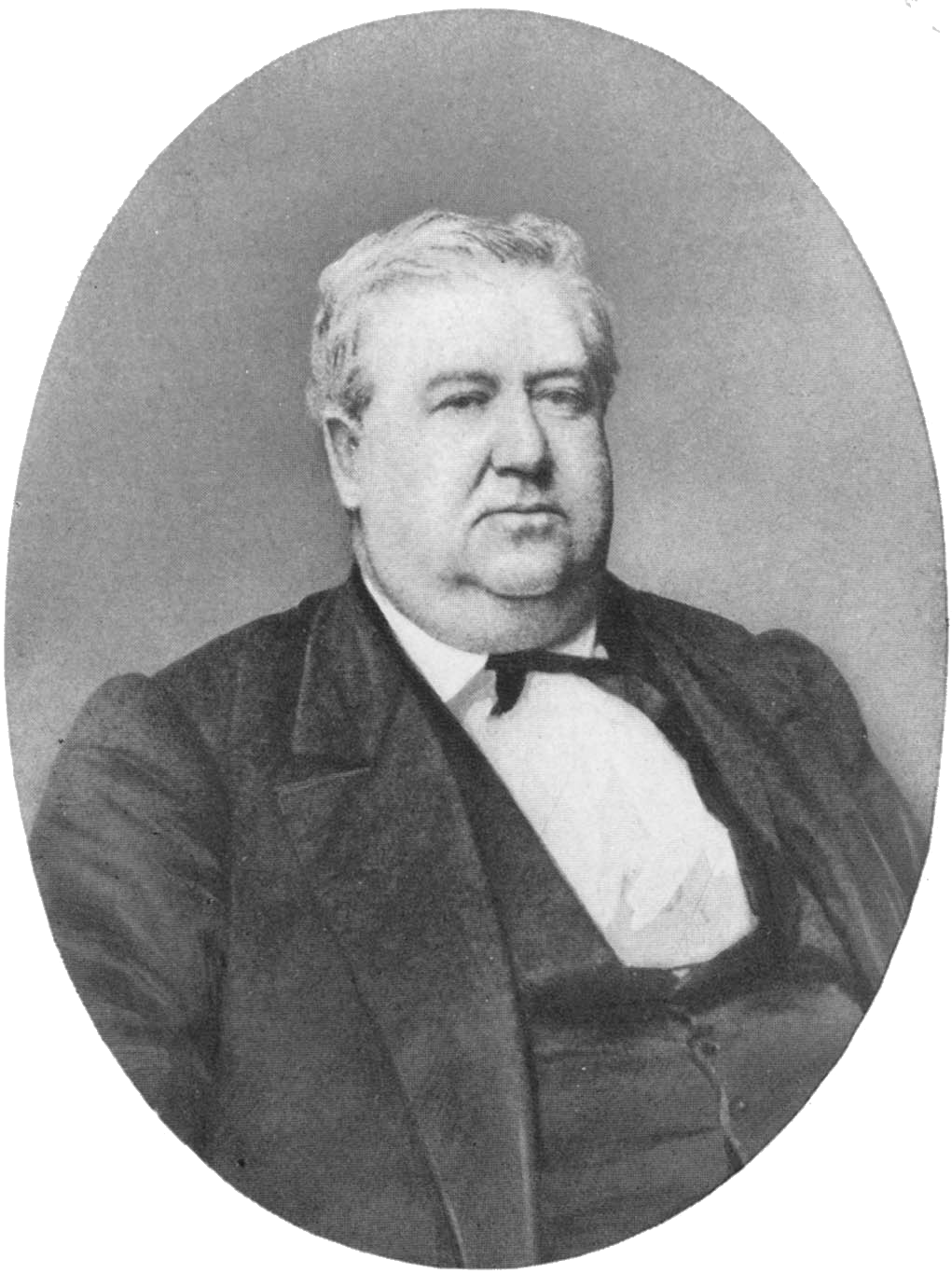
Preston King

In 1830, he established the St. Lawrence Republican and was Postmaster of Ogdensburg from 1831 to 1834 during the administration of President Martin Van Buren. He was a Democratic member of the New York State Assembly (St. Lawrence Co.) from 1835 to 1838, sitting in the 58th, 59th, 60th and 61st New York State Legislatures.

King was elected as a Democrat to the 28th and 29th United States Congresses, holding office from March 4, 1843, to March 3, 1847. He was Chairman of the U.S. House Committee on Invalid Pensions (29th Congress). In 1847, when there was an open rupture between the Barnburners and Hunkers at the Democratic State Convention, King was made chairman of the former and Robert H. Morris of the latter.

He was elected as a Free Soiler to the 31st and 32nd United States Congresses, holding office from March 4, 1849, to March 3, 1853.

He was elected as a Republican to the U.S. Senate in February 1857, and served from March 4, 1857, to March 4, 1863. He was Chairman of the U.S. Senate Committee on Revolutionary Claims (37th Congress).

=== Later career ===
Afterwards he resumed the practice of law, was considered for the Republican vice-presidential nomination in 1860 and was a presidential elector on the Abraham Lincoln ticket in 1864, where he was largely instrumental in procuring the nomination of Andrew Johnson for the Vice-Presidency. After the death of President Lincoln, he served as effective White House Chief of Staff during the early days of the Johnson Administration.

On August 14, 1865, King was appointed by President Andrew Johnson Collector of the Port of New York, in an effort to eliminate corruption in the Port of New York and to heal divisions within the Republican Party. After his death, he was succeeded by acting Collector Charles P. Clinch (brother-in-law of Alexander Turney Stewart).

== Personal life ==
According to The New York Times, he was "remarkable for obesity. Though short of stature--only five feet six inches--he weighed over two hundred and fifty pounds. He tried hard to reduce his flesh by a course of dieting, but failed. Latterly, he took little exercise, but did a great deal of toilsome mind work."

Despairing of success, King killed himself by tying a bag of bullets around his neck and leaping from a ferryboat in New York Harbor on November 13, 1865. After a funeral at the Ogdensburg Episcopal Church, his remains were buried alongside his father and mother at the City Cemetery in Ogdensburg.

U.S. House of Representatives
Preceded by Thomas C. Chittenden	Member of the U.S. House of Representatives from New York's 18th congressional district 1843–1847	Succeeded by William Collins
Preceded by William Collins	Member of the U.S. House of Representatives from New York's 18th congressional district 1849–1853	Succeeded by Peter Rowe
U.S. Senate
Preceded by Hamilton Fish	U.S. senator (Class 1) from New York; 1857–1863; Served alongside: William H. Seward and Ira Harris	Succeeded by Edwin D. Morgan
Government offices
Preceded by Simeon Draper	Collector of the Port of New York; 1865	Succeeded by Charles P. Clinch; Acting
