= 1851 New York state election =

- November 4, 1851

The 1851 New York state election was held on November 4, 1851, to elect the Secretary of State, the State Comptroller, the State Attorney General, the State Treasurer, the State Engineer, a Judge of the New York Court of Appeals, a Canal Commissioner and an Inspector of State Prisons, as well as all members of the New York State Assembly and the New York State Senate.

The Democratic state convention met on September 10 in Syracuse. The Whig state convention met on September 11 in Syracuse. Horace Wheaton, candidate for Canal Commissioner, was the sitting Mayor of Syracuse.

== Results ==
Six out of eight state offices were won by the Democrats, the most important ones by margins of a few hundred votes out of about 400,000 cast. The incumbent Chatfield was re-elected. The incumbents Seymour, Foot and Wells were defeated.

Six Democrats and four Whigs were elected to the district benches of the New York State Supreme Court.

1851 state election results
Office	Democratic ticket		Whig ticket	
Secretary of State	Henry S. Randall	199,426	James C. Forsyth	198,582
Comptroller	John C. Wright	200,790	George W. Patterson	200,532
Attorney General	Levi S. Chatfield	200,205	Daniel Ullmann	199,973
Treasurer	Benjamin Welch, Jr.	200,465	James M. Cook	200,693
State Engineer	William J. McAlpine	203,032	Hezekiah C. Seymour	199,301
Judge of the Court of Appeals	Alexander S. Johnson	201,144	Samuel Alfred Foot	197,823
Canal Commissioner	Horace Wheaton	200,231	Henry Fitzhugh	201,147
Inspector of State Prisons	Henry Storms	202,801	Alexander H. Wells	198,578

== Contested election ==
The Whig candidate James M. Cook was declared elected state treasurer with a majority of only 228 votes, but Attorney General Chatfield contested the result in the New York Supreme Court in favor of Welch, claiming that ballots with a name similar to that of the candidate Benjamin Welch, Jr., had been counted as "scattering" but had been intended for Welch. In fact the official state canvass shows ballots for "Benjamin Welch" in Chemung (68), Kings (1), Saratoga (1) and Tompkins (47), "B. Welch" in Chenango (1), Livingston (1) and New York (1), "B. J. Welch" in Livingston (1), and "Benjamin C. Welch, Jr." in Ontario (32); a total of 153. On the other side, the official canvass also shows votes for "J. M. Cook" in Kings (1), "J. W. Cook" in Livingston (2), "Cook" in New York (2), "James Cook" in Saratoga (1), "James A. Cook" in Suffolk (15) and "John M Cook" in Yates (1), a total of 22. Besides, votes from several election districts were disallowed on technicalities (49 for Welch and 24 for Cook in Chesterfield, Essex County, New York; 332 for Welch and 66 for Cook in the second election district of the 14th Ward in New York City). On September 30, 1852, the election result was reversed by the Supreme Court, but Cook refused to deliver the office and the books. Welch sued for the delivery of the books, but the motion was denied. After some more legal proceedings, Welch took office as Treasurer for the remainder of the term on November 20, 1852.

== Sources ==
- Result in Official State Canvas. New-York Daily Times. January 1, 1852. p. 7.
- Harpers New Monthly Magazine (June–November 1851, pages 693ff)
- The People vs. James M. Cook in Reports of Cases in Law and Equity in the Supreme Court of the State of New York by Oliver Lorenzo Barbour (Gould, Banks & Gould, 1853; pages 259 to 328)
- Welch agt. Cook in Practice Reports in the Supreme Court and Court of Appeals by Nathan Howard & Rowland M. Stover (Joel Munsell, 1852; pages 173 to 181)

== See also ==
- New York state elections
