= 1852 New York state election =

- November 2, 1852

The 1852 New York state election was held on November 2, 1852, to elect the governor, the lieutenant governor, a Canal Commissioner and an Inspector of State Prisons, as well as all members of the New York State Assembly.

== History ==
The Democratic state convention met on September 1 and 2 in Syracuse. Wheeler H. Bristol was Temporary President on September 1, Henry Stevens from Cortland County was elected president on September 2. Seymour was nominated for governor on the second ballot (Seymour 78, Augustus Schell 21, 5 other candidates with fewer votes). Lt. Gov. Church was re-nominated on the first ballot (Church 69, Augustus Schell 54, 2 other candidates with a few votes). Canal Commissioner Follett was re-nominated on the first ballot with 81 votes. Prison Inspector Clark was re-nominated on the first ballot with 82 votes.

The Whig state convention met on September 22 at the City Hall in Syracuse, Henry W. Taylor from Ontario County presided. Governor Hunt was re-nominated by acclamation. Judge Kent was nominated for Lt. Gov. on the second ballot (Kent 64, James M. Cook 28, 4 other candidates with fewer votes). Kempshall was nominated for Canal Commissioner by acclamation. Crosby, from Dutchess County, was nominated for Prison Inspector on the second ballot.

The Free Democratic state convention met on September 29 in Syracuse, New York, and passed a series of strong free soil resolutions. They nominated Tompkins, Gates, Wheaton, Curtis, and Hiram Barney and Alfred Babcock for presidential electors at large.

== Candidates ==
Minthorne Tompkins was the son of U.S. Vice President Daniel D. Tompkins, William Kent was the son of Chancellor James Kent. Seth M Gates and Charles A. Wheaton ran for the second time (also 1848) unsuccessfully for Lt. Gov. and Canal Commissioner.

== Results ==
The whole Democratic ticket was elected.

The incumbent governor Hunt was defeated, the incumbent Church, Follett and Clark were re-elected.

86 Democrats, 41 Whigs and one Independent were elected for the session of 1853 to the New York State Assembly.

1852 state election results
Office	Democratic ticket		Whig ticket		Free Democratic ticket	
Governor	Horatio Seymour	264,121	Washington Hunt	241,525	Minthorne Tompkins	19,661
Lieutenant Governor	Sanford E. Church	266,147	William Kent	240,273	Seth M. Gates	19,760
Canal Commissioner	Frederick Follett	264,246	Thomas Kempshall	241,848	Charles A. Wheaton	19,445
Inspector of State Prisons	Darius Clark		Epenetus Crosby		George Curtis	

== See also ==
- New York gubernatorial elections
- New York state elections

== Sources ==
- Result for Gov. in The New York Civil List compiled by Franklin Benjamin Hough (page 31; Weed, Parsons and Co., 1858)
- Result in The Tribune Almanac 1853
