= 1854 New York state election =

- November 7, 1854

The 1854 New York state election was held on November 7, 1854, to elect the governor, the lieutenant governor, a Canal Commissioner and an Inspector of State Prisons, as well as all members of the New York State Assembly.

== History ==
The National Democratic (in the press referred to as Hards) state convention met in July and nominated Greene Bronson for governor as well as candidates for the other down-ballot offices. They informed the nominees by letter on July 12 of their nominations. Their letters of acceptance were published on September 11 in the New-York Daily Times.

The Democratic (in the press referred to as Softs) state convention met on September 6 at Wieting Hall in Syracuse. Lorenzo B. Shepard was Temporary Chairman until the choice of William H. Ludlow as President. The convention appointed a Democratic State Central Committee which included John Cochrane and Horatio Ballard, and then adjourned. On September 7, the convention passed a resolution approving the Kansas–Nebraska Act, which led to the eventual withdrawal of delegates Preston King, Charles G. Myers, Abijah Mann, Philip Dorsheimer and few more Barnburners, all of whom would be the next year among the founders of the Republican Party. Governor Horatio Seymour was re-nominated "by acclamation" with a few contrary votes. William H. Ludlow was nominated for Lieutenant Governor on the first ballot (vote: Ludlow 234, Philip H. Crook 28, Oakley 14, Albert Lester 7, Isaiah Rynders 2, Preston King 2). Jason Clark was nominated for Canal Commissioner by acclamation. W. R. Andrews was nominated for Inspector of State Prisons on the first ballot (vote: Andrews 92, Amos Pilsbury 56, Henry Storms [incumbent] 27).

The Free-Soil Democratic state convention met on September 25 in Auburn.

The Anti-Nebraska state convention met on September 26 in Auburn. Myron H. Clark was nominated for Governor by acclamation. Henry J. Raymond was nominated for Lieutenant Governor on the first ballot (Raymond 127, Bradford R. Wood 84). After this vote, a minority of about 20 seceded from the convention and re-assembled at the Court House and nominated their own ticket.

The Temperance state convention met on September 27 in Auburn. Myron H. Clark was nominated for Governor by acclamation. Henry J. Raymond was nominated for Lieutenant Governor on the first ballot (Raymond 163, Bradford R. Wood 112).

The Liberty state convention met on September 28 at the Market Hall in Syracuse.

The Anti-Rent state convention met on October 26 at Beardsley's Hall in Albany.

== Results ==
Due to the split of the Democratic Party, the whole Whig ticket was elected. The American Party (ridiculed and referred to as the Know Nothings in the press) showed surprising strength. Myron H. Clark won this election with the lowest percentage in any New York gubernatorial election. The incumbent Governor Seymour was defeated, the incumbent Fitzhugh was re-elected.

82 Whigs, 26 Softs, 16 Hards and 3 Temperance man were elected for the session of 1855 to the New York State Assembly. "Know Nothings are sprinkled miscellaneously among Whigs, Hards and Softs; and exactly how many there are of these gentry in the Assembly Nobody Knows."

1854 state election results
Office	Whig ticket		Dem. (Softs) ticket		American Party ticket		Dem. (Hards) ticket		Anti-Nebraska ticket	Anti-Nebraska (seceders) ticket		Free Democratic ticket	Anti-Rent ticket	Temperance ticket	Liberty ticket	
Governor	Myron H. Clark	156,804	Horatio Seymour	156,495	Daniel Ullmann	122,282	Greene C. Bronson	33,850	Myron H. Clark	Myron H. Clark		Myron H. Clark	Myron H. Clark	Myron H. Clark	William Goodell	289
Lieutenant Governor	Henry J. Raymond	157,166	William H. Ludlow	128,833	Gustavus Adolphus Scroggs	121,037	Elijah Ford	52,074	Henry J. Raymond	Bradford R. Wood	8,378	Bradford R. Wood	Bradford R. Wood	Henry J. Raymond	Austin Ward	326
Canal Commissioner	Henry Fitzhugh	161,006	Jason Clark	125,210	Josiah B. Williams	58,244	Clark Burnham	113,968	Henry Fitzhugh	Charles A. Wheaton	7,435	Charles A. Wheaton	Henry Fitzhugh		John C. Harrington	261
Inspector of State Prisons	Norwood Bowne	153,947	William R. Andrews	124,735	James P. Sanders	120,747	Abram Vernam	41,978	Norwood Bowne	Philip H. Macomber	7,567	Philip H. Macomber	Norwood Bowne		William Shapcott	242

== See also ==
- New York gubernatorial elections
- New York state elections

== Sources ==
- Result in "Official Canvass 1854". New-York Daily Times. December 21, 1854. pp. 6–7. (The votes of Wood, Goodell, Ward, Harrington, Wheaton, Macomber and Shapcott were stated among the "scattering votes".)
- Result in The Tribune Almanac 1855
