= 1849 New York state election =

- November 6, 1849

The 1849 New York state election was held on November 6, 1849, to elect the Secretary of State, the State Comptroller, the Attorney General, the State Treasurer, the State Engineer, a Judge of the New York Court of Appeals, a Canal Commissioner and an Inspector of State Prisons, as well as all members of the New York State Assembly and the New York State Senate.

== History ==
After the split in 1847 and 1848 which had led to the loss of all state offices, Barnburners and Hunkers now combined again and nominated a Democratic ticket. The Hunker state convention met on September 6 in Syracuse and nominated Lott, Chatfield, Follett, Clark, Hiram Denio for the Court of Appeals, Jesse C. Dana for Secretary of State, Darius A. Ogden for Treasurer and John D. Fay for State Engineer, and offered the Barnburners to substitute the latter four. The Barnburner state convention met on September 12 in Utica and nominated Jewett, Randall, Welch and Campbell, to complete the joint ticket.

== Results ==
The whole cross-endorsed Anti-Rent ticket was elected again, this time four Whigs and four Democrats. The incumbents Morgan, Washington Hunt, Alvah Hunt and Jewett were re-elected. The incumbent Beach was defeated. Three Hunkers and only one Barnburner were elected on the Democratic ticket.

17 Whigs and 15 Democrats were elected to a two-year term (1850–51) in the New York State Senate.

64 Democrats and 64 Whigs were declared elected to the New York State Assembly of the 73rd New York State Legislature.

1849 state election results
Office	Whig ticket		Democratic ticket		Anti-Rent ticket
Secretary of State	Christopher Morgan	203,875	Henry S. Randall	201,189	Christopher Morgan
Comptroller	Washington Hunt	205,034	John A. Lott	199,134	Washington Hunt
Attorney General	Samuel Stevens	199,779	Levi S. Chatfield	204,795	Levi S. Chatfield
Treasurer	Alvah Hunt	204,317	Benjamin Welch, Jr.	199,134	Alvah Hunt
State Engineer	Hezekiah C. Seymour	204,175	Alexander Campbell	201,027	Hezekiah C. Seymour
Judge of the Court of Appeals	Joshua A. Spencer	196,680	Freeborn G. Jewett	200,988	Freeborn G. Jewett
Canal Commissioner	Nelson J. Beach	201,633	Frederick Follett	202,959	Frederick Follett
Inspector of State Prisons	Benjamin Squire	200,726	Darius Clark	204,635	Darius Clark

== See also ==
- New York state elections

== Sources ==
- The United States Magazine and Democratic Review (Langtree & O'Sullivan, 1849; pages 378f)
- Results in The Whig Almanac and United States Register for 1850
