= Charles Augustus Wheaton =

American politician

Charles August Wheaton

Minnesota House of Representatives
- In office 1867 – 1868 (?)

Personal details
- Born: July 1, 1809 Amenia, New York
- Died: March 14, 1882 (aged 72) Northfield, Minnesota
- Party: Democratic Party of New York Republican Party of Minnesota
- Spouse(s): Ellen Douglas Birdseye (March 13, 1816 – December 17, 1858); Martha Elizabeth (Archibald) Wagener (August 19, 1826 - March 29, 1912)
- Children: 17
- Occupation: Business Owner

Charles Augustus Wheaton (1809–1882) was a businessman and major figure in the central New York state abolitionist movement and Underground Railroad, as well as other progressive causes. He was one of the founders of the First Congregational Church in Syracuse, which took an abolitionist stand, and was part of the Vigilance Committee that formed in 1850 to resist the Fugitive Slave Law.

In 1860 he moved to Northfield, Minnesota, where he was one of two men who donated the land to found the Carleton College campus. There he served with the Minnesota legislature. The father of a total of 17 children, he had an active family life. He later became the editor of two local newspapers.

== Early life and education ==
Charles Augustus Wheaton was born on 1 July 1809 in Amenia, New York, the son of Augustus Wheaton, a farmer and drover, and his wife. He had two brothers. The parents purchased a 410 acres (1.7 km^{2}) farm in the town of Pompey in Onondaga County in 1807. They migrated there from Dutchess County with their family in 1810. They had followed three of the elder Wheaton's sisters: Lydia, Sylvia and Loraine, who had already moved to Pompey with their families, part of a westward migration of many in the state in the years after the American Revolutionary War. Charles attended the Pompey Academy, a well-regarded boys' school.

Charles Wheaton's eldest brother Orlin J. became a farmer and drover like their father. Their brother Horace served as a Representative from New York in the US Congress and later became the fourth mayor of the city of Syracuse. He also became a partner with Charles in his future hardware business in Syracuse.

== Marriage and family ==
Wheaton married Ellen Douglas Birdseye on June 24, 1834, at the First Presbyterian Church in Syracuse, where they were both members for a time. They had been neighbors in Pompey. He was 25 and she was 18.

She was the second of twelve children of Electa (née Beebee) and Victory Birdseye. The father was one of Onondaga County's leading politicians. Birdseye practiced law and served two terms in Congress. He was postmaster of Pompey Hill for 22 years, district attorney of Onondaga County for 14 years, and held numerous other political offices. The original Birdseye House is now part of the Onondaga County Freedom Trail. A descendant founded Birds Eye Frozen Foods.

Charles and Ellen Wheaton had twelve children together, including Cornelia (b. 1835), Lucia, Henry Birdseye, and Charles A. Wheaton (b. 1853).

Ellen was well educated, having attended a girls seminary in Cortland and music school in the state capital of Albany. She is reported to have owned the first piano in Pompey. She is best known for a notable diary she kept from 1850 to 1858, detailing her life as a wife and mother of a large family. The Wheaton family privately published The Diary of Ellen Birdseye Wheaton in 1923. Selections from the diary were reprinted in the Syracuse Post-Standard newspaper in March 2002. Birdseye Wheaton died in 1858 at age 42 from tuberculosis.

Progressive views and activism, particularly relating to abolition and women's rights, were an important part of the Wheatons' family life. They sent some of their children to the private school in New Jersey run by Theodore Weld and Angelina Weld Grimké, advocates for these progressive causes.

After the death of Ellen in 1858 and moving to join friends in Northfield, Minnesota in 1860, Wheaton married the widow Martha Elizabeth (Archibald) Wagener in 1861. She had also moved from central New York, migrating with her parents after losing her husband and their three sons to illness. The senior Archibalds owned flour mills in Dundas.

Charles and Mary Wheaton had five children: Frederick (1862–1881), Robert (1863–1898), Allan (1866–1934), Edith (1868–1950) and Annabel (1870–1946). They also reared together some of the younger of Wheaton's 12 children from his first marriage.

== Career ==
As a young man, Charles clerked in the general store owned by his brother-in-law Moses Seymour Marsh. Retail businesses were a growing part of the economy.

In 1835, soon after the birth of their first child, the Wheaton family moved to Syracuse, where Charles went into the hardware business. Wheaton and a variety of partners, including his brother Horace, built a prosperous company. Over the course of 20 years, the Wheatons lived in seven houses, moving to larger homes as family and fortune grew. None of the Wheaton homes in Syracuse are believed to exist.

In 1849, the Wheatons' close friends and fellow abolitionists, John and Anna Loomis North, left Syracuse to move to Minnesota. Ellen noted their departure in her diary, "[John] thinks very highly of the climate and resources in Minnesota, and says it is rapidly filling up with an Eastern population." The Norths were to play an important role in Wheaton's life after Ellen's early death in 1858.

When his hardware store burned in 1851, Wheaton built C.A. Wheaton & Co.—housed in the city's grandest mercantile block, a four-story building overlooking the Erie Canal and Clinton Square. In 1852, the Wheatons were at the peak of their wealth. They moved to Fayette Park, one of the city's most fashionable neighborhoods.

Wheaton sold his share of the hardware business in 1853. He also sold the Wheaton Block for $112,000, the largest sale to that date in Syracuse. He invested heavily in a printing press foundry. He also invested in a project to build a railroad from South Carolina to Tennessee. In 1854, a banking crisis and an economic depression struck New York. By 1855, the family were broke.

Ellen died suddenly at age 42 on December 17, 1858, the day after the wedding of their eldest daughter Cornelia. Her funeral was a Swedenborgian service and she was buried in Hilltop Cemetery in Pompey, New York.

== Abolitionist and political activities ==
The Wheatons were part of a large network of abolitionists in Syracuse and knew John Brown personally. Their anti-slavery activities began as early as 1838, when Wheaton helped found the First Congregational Church in Syracuse. He and other pro-abolition supporters left the First Presbyterian Church, which would not take a position against slavery, to found the new congregation. Many of its members worked as activists.

Between 1839 and 1847, the Wheatons operated their house as a station on Underground Railroad, helping escaped slaves travel to Canada. His public reputation as an abolitionist was such that the family seamstress, a Mrs. MacManus, was said to have reported to a census taker that Wheaton was "president of the Underground Railroad."

In a notable case in 1839, Syracuse abolitionists helped the slave Harriet Powell to escape from her masters, a family from Mississippi who were staying at a local hotel. Officials suspected Charles Wheaton of being involved. Local law enforcement officers searched the Wheaton's home for Powell without success. She made it to Canada.

Wheaton was one of 600 people in Syracuse who signed a call for a meeting at the Syracuse City Hall on May 16, 1850, to discuss the proposed Compromise of 1850. Participants supported the admission of California as a free state, opposed territorial governments for New Mexico and Utah that did not prohibit slavery, opposed any fugitive slave law, and supported abolition of slavery in the national capital, stating, "We should rejoice to witness the removal of this stain [slavery in Washington, D.C.] upon the national character." Despite much publicly stated opposition in the North, the southern slave states had enough votes in the US Congress to pass the Fugitive Slave Act.

The Law required all citizens to support capturing escaped slaves and returning them to their masters, even if found in northern states that prohibited slavery. US Marshals were to enforce the law. Its passage aroused the anti-slavery movement in Syracuse. On October 4, 1850, a biracial group chaired by A.H. Hovey, mayor of Syracuse, appointed a Vigilance Committee of thirteen men. They included Wheaton, Lyman Clary, Vivus W. Smith, Charles B. Sedgwick, Hiram Putnam, E.W. Leavenworth, Abner Bates, George Barnes, P.H. Agan, J.W. Loguen, minister of the AME Zion Church; John Wilkinson, R.R. Raymond, and John Thomas. They intended to resist the Fugitive Slave Law and sent copies of their resolution to the newspaper, political representatives, and Congress.

On October 15, Wheaton spoke to a meeting at the Congregational Church to make "common cause, in view of various arrests rumored to have been made, or to be made under the Fugitive Slave act, and on charges of Treason." The meeting was led by men of both races: Enoch Marks, white, and George B. Vashon, African American. The group was committed to nonviolent action, and members pledged "our fortunes and our sacred honor, to stand by those individuals on whom this hand of government may fall; that we will help to bear with them any pecuniary losses to which they may be subjected, and manifest in every way we can, our sympathy for them, and show that we suffer as those who are bound with them." Other speakers included the Reverend R.R. Raymond, the Rev. Samuel J. May, William H. Burleigh, Lyman Clary and George Barnes.

On October 1, 1851, Wheaton was part of a biracial group who rescued William "Jerry" Henry, an escaped slave apprehended and jailed in Syracuse. That evening, a crowd of two to three thousand people gathered outside the jail. The crowd eventually rescued and freed Henry. At the time, Wheaton was with fellow abolitionist Judge Charles Sedgwick to prepare a kidnapping complaint against the agent sent to catch Henry.

When the federal government investigated the case, it traced the file used to cut Henry's fetters to the Wheaton house. The federal government tried to find witnesses against the Wheatons and others. Ellen Wheaton estimated that perhaps half of Syracuse residents supported the rescue. She wrote, "Charles confidently expected to be arrested, but has not been as yet. The proceedings of the U.S. District Attorney are as secret as possible—and everything wears the appearance of injustice and knavery."

Newspapers across the state denounced the overtaking of the jail and freeing the prisoner. Some 677 Syracuse-area residents signed a petition of protest against the action. After four days of hiding Henry, abolitionists disguised him in women's clothing and took him to Oswego on Lake Ontario. There he boarded a ship to Kingston, Ontario and freedom.

A federal grand jury indicted Wheaton and twelve other men—nine European Americans and four African Americans— for the action at the jail and Henry's escape, but Wheaton was never arrested or tried. The event became known as the Jerry Rescue.

Wheaton ran for Canal Commissioner in 1848 on the Free Soil ticket, and in 1852 and 1854 on the Free Democratic ticket. He was defeated each time. He also ran unsuccessfully for mayor of Syracuse on the Temperance ticket in 1852.

== Minnesota (1860–1882) ==
Wheaton suffered after the death of his wife Ellen in 1858. His friends the Norths wrote from Minnesota in 1859, urging him to join them in Northfield, which they had founded. The following year, Wheaton moved there with many of his 12 children, joining other Syracuse families who had migrated to join the North family. When John North had earlier suffered financial failure in the Panic of 1857, Wheaton purchased his interests in the local flour mill and other properties—an act that may have economically saved the town. For some time, Wheaton's Northfield Mills produced "choice family flour."

After his second marriage in 1861, Wheaton and his large family first took over the second floor of the American House Hotel, built by John North in 1857. (The hotel became the first building of Northfield College, later renamed Carleton College.) The family built a new house of Greek Revival style at 405 Washington Street, where they moved in 1868. The house was divided and moved in 1938. Both portions of the original house still stand in Northfield. The main house is about five blocks south of its original location and the "L" portion is on 9th Street West.

In 1864 Wheaton sold the flour mill to Captain Jesse Ames and his sons, John and Adelbert. Ames and the Archibalds perfected flour milling processes that produced what was recognized as the best flour in the nation with higher yields at the mills. The Ames Mill was the basis of the Malt-O-Meal company.

In 1866, Wheaton was elected to the House of the Minnesota State Legislature, where he served one term, from 1867 to 1868. That same year, Wheaton and Charles M. Goodsell each gave a 10-acre (40,000 m^{2}) plot of land to the fledgling Northfield College to establish the college campus just north of the main part of town.

Wheaton later became editor of the Northfield Standard newspaper and later the Rice County Journal, long considered one of the first and finest weekly newspapers published in the Midwest in the 1800s. He regularly wrote a column, "Sunday's Doings," that reviewed the sermons of local ministers. He also reported on congregations, noting the attendance (or lack) of prominent church members. To prepare his column, Wheaton visited up to three local churches on any given Sunday.

When Wheaton died in 1882 at the age of 72, the bank and businesses of Northfield closed for the funeral as a sign of respect. A tribute of the time read, "In Northfield his editorial pen was ever at the disposal of any good cause, and he was a leader in all progressive causes."

Preceded by Charles Taylor	Minnesota House of Representatives District 8; 1867	Succeeded by Jesse Ames
