= Norwood Bowne =

American newspaper editor and politician

New York State Prison Inspector
- In office January 1, 1855 – December 31, 1857

Postmaster of Delhi, New York
- In office 1849–1852

Personal details
- Born: May 2, 1813 New York City, U.S.
- Died: January 7, 1890 (aged 76) Delhi, New York, U.S.
- Party: Whig
- Occupation: Politician, newspaper editor

Norwood Bowne (May 2, 1813 in New York City – January 7, 1890 in Delhi, Delaware County, New York) was an American newspaper editor and politician from New York.

== Life ==
In his youthful years, he learned the printer's trade. In 1830, he moved to Delhi, New York, to study law with Charles Hathaway. Charles had married Bowne's sister, Maria Augusta in 1828, but worked for the Delaware Republican. This paper was not successful, and Bowne returned to New York City, where he published the Protestant Vindicator. In 1834, the printing and publishing house was destroyed by fire. In 1839, he returned to Delhi, New York, and from January 1839 until his death, he published the Delaware Express.

He was postmaster of Delhi, New York, from 1849 to 1852.

In 1854, he was elected an inspector of state prisons, holding office from 1855 to 1857.

In 1876, he ran for presidential elector on the Republican Rutherford B. Hayes ticket, but New York was won by Samuel J. Tilden.

== Sources ==
- The New York Civil List compiled by Franklin Benjamin Hough (pages 45 and 370; Weed, Parsons and Co., 1858)
- The New York Civil List compiled by Franklin Benjamin Hough, Stephen C. Hutchins and Edgar Albert Werner (1867; pages 411 and 507)
- THE REPUBLICAN NOMINATIONS in NYT on November 4, 1876
- History of Delaware County
