= William Clark (politician, born 1811) =

American politician (1811–1885)

William Clark (June 25, 1811, in Cooperstown, Otsego County, New York – May 28, 1885) was an American politician from New York.

== Life ==
He was the son of Cyrenus Clark (born 1772) and Rachel (Tracy) Clark (born 1777). In 1836, he married Anna Maria Newkirk (1819–1854).

He engaged in the produce and forwarding business at Fort Plain. He was at times Supervisor of the Town of Minden; and a trustee and President of the Village of Fort Plain.

He was a member of the New York State Assembly (Montgomery Co., 2nd D.) in 1852; and of the New York State Senate (15th D.) in 1863.

== Sources ==
- The New York Civil List compiled by Franklin Benjamin Hough, Stephen C. Hutchins and Edgar Albert Werner (1870; pg. 443 and 474)
- Biographical Sketches of the State Officers and the Members of the Legislature of the State of New York in 1862 and '63 by William D. Murphy (1863; pg. 53ff)
- Hyde Genealogy by Reuben H. Walworth (1863; pg. 453)
- DIED;... ANNA MARIA, wife of William Clark... in NYT on October 2, 1854
- OBITUARY NOTES; The Hon. William Clark... in NYT on May 29, 1885

New York State Assembly
Preceded by Conrad P. Snell	New York State Assembly; Montgomery County, 2nd District; 1852	Succeeded by Abram N. Van Alstine
New York State Senate
Preceded by John Willard	New York State Senate; 15th District; 1863	Succeeded by James M. Cook
