= Augustus Schell =

American lawyer (1812–1884)

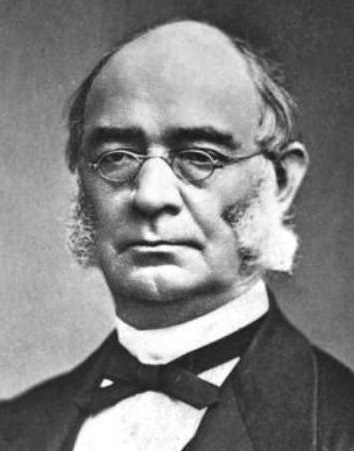

Chairman of the Democratic National Committee
- In office 1872–1876
- Preceded by: August Belmont, Sr.
- Succeeded by: Abram S. Hewitt

Collector of the Port of New York
- In office 1857–1861
- Preceded by: Heman J. Redfield
- Succeeded by: Hiram Barney

Chairman of the New York State Democratic Committee
- In office 1853–1856

Personal details
- Born: August 1, 1812 Rhinebeck, New York, U.S.
- Died: March 27, 1884 (aged 71) New York City, New York, U.S.
- Resting place: Woodlawn Cemetery
- Party: Democratic
- Spouse: Anna Mott Fox
- Relations: Richard Schell (brother); Edward Schell (brother)
- Parent(s): Christian Schell; Elizabeth Hughes
- Education: Union College; Litchfield Law School

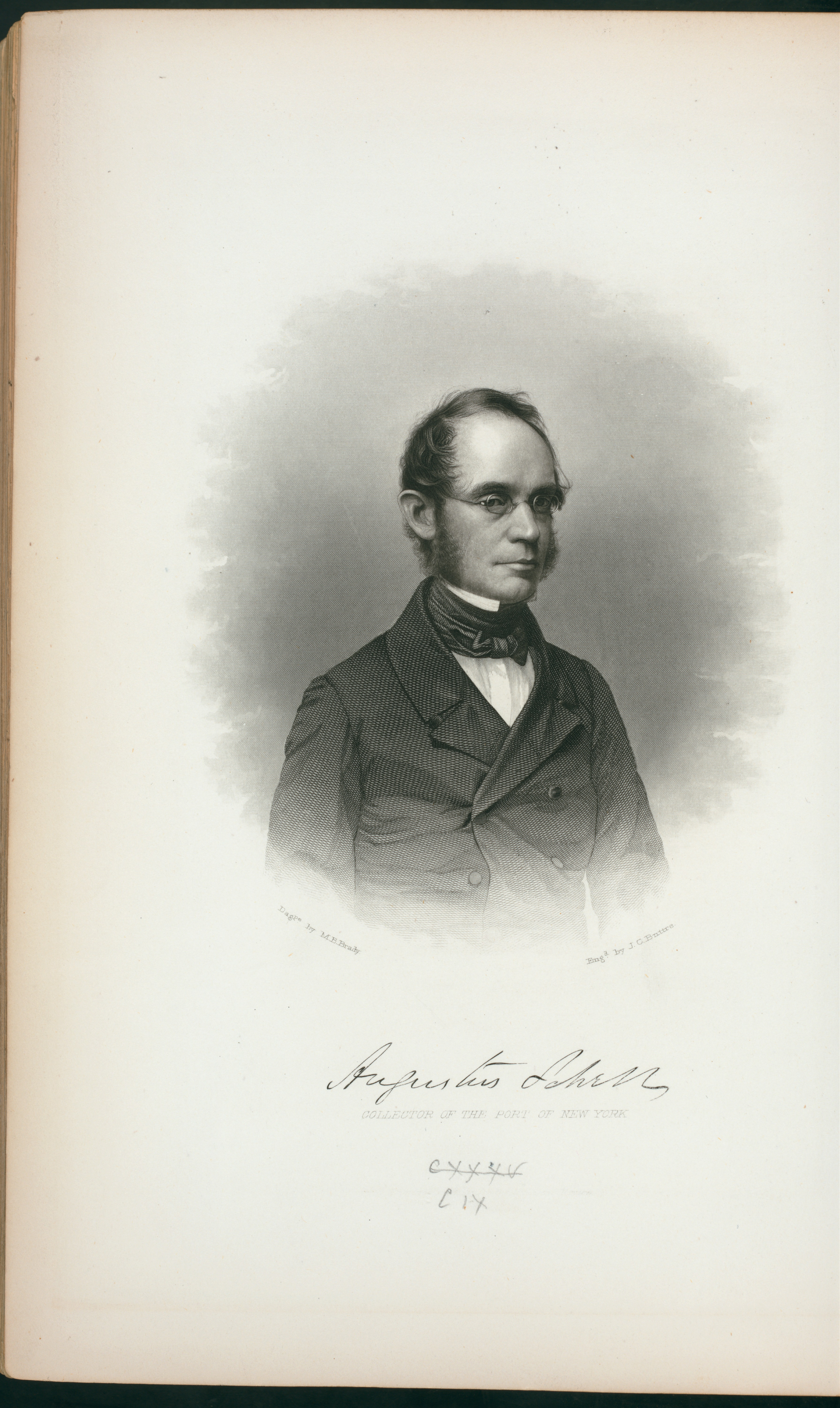
A younger Schell as Collector of the Port of New York

Augustus Schell (August 1, 1812 – March 27, 1884) was a New York politician and lawyer. He was Chairman of the Democratic National Committee from 1872 to 1876.

== Early life ==
Schell was born on August 1, 1812, in Rhinebeck, New York. He was the son of Christian Schell (1779–1825), a merchant, and Elizabeth (née Hughes) Schell (1783–1866). He was the brother of U.S. Representative Richard Schell (1810–1879), Robert Schell (1815–1900), and Edward Schell (1819–1893), who were well-known business men of New York City.

His paternal grandparents were Richard Schell and Anna (née Schultz) Schell.

He was educated at Rhinebeck Academy and Wesleyan Seminary. He was graduated in 1830 from Union College with Phi Beta Kappa honors and membership in the Kappa Alpha Society, and then studied at Litchfield Law School.

== Career ==
He was admitted to the bar in 1833, and started a practice in New York City at the firm of John Slosson (1806–1872), later a judge of the New York Superior Court; he formed a firm (Slosson & Schell) with Slosson in 1842. He started out as an early expert in the then new field of corporate law and through his profession became active in railroad management. A friend of Cornelius Vanderbilt, he gradually expanded his railroad connections through investments as well as legal counsel.

He was a director in many railroad and financial corporations, including the Harlem Railroad, Lake Shore and Michigan Central, and Hudson River Railroads as well as the Western Union Telegraph Company. He was also active in the management of philanthropic institutions, including 19 years as Chairman of the Executive Committee of the New-York Historical Society.

=== Political career ===
An active Democrat, he joined Tammany Hall in 1852 where, after William M. Tweed's fall, he succeeded August Belmont, Sr. as Grand Sachem in 1870. He was head of the Democratic state committee from 1853 to 1856. In the 1852, he was proposed as the Democratic candidate for Governor of New York, although he lost the nomination to Horatio Seymour, who was elected Governor.

During the administration of President James Buchanan, he was Collector of the Port of New York.

He was chairman of the Democratic National Committee that supported John C. Breckinridge for the presidency in 1860 and also from 1872 to 1876, where he managed Horace Greeley's presidential campaign. In 1872, his name was again put forth for the nomination for Democratic candidate for Governor, but he was prevented by the work of Samuel Jones Tilden, who was then the Chairman of the New York State Democratic Committee. After the trial of William M. Tweed and his associates, Schell became the Grand Sachem of Tammany Hall and labored for the purification and rehabilitation of the Tammany society. In 1878, he was an unsuccessful candidate for mayor.

== Personal life ==
Schell was married to Anna Mott Fox (1827–1905), the daughter of George Shotwell Fox and Rebecca Leggett Fox. At his death, he was worth several million dollars, but having had no children, he left all of his money to his nieces and nephews, except for $200,000 in cash and his home at 9 West 34th Street in New York City to his wife, the aunt of Austen George Fox.

He died on March 27, 1884, from Bright's disease. He was buried at Woodlawn Cemetery in The Bronx.

=== Legacy ===
Augustus Schell is the namesake of Schell City, Missouri, of which he was one of the original proprietors.

Party political offices
Preceded by	New York State Democratic Committee Chairman; 1853 – 1856	Succeeded by
Preceded by August Belmont Sr.	Grand Sachem of Tammany Hall; 1870 – 1876	Succeeded by Charles H. Haswell
Preceded by August Belmont Sr.	Democratic National Committee Chairman; 1872 – 1876	Succeeded by Abram S. Hewitt
Government offices
Preceded by Heman J. Redfield	Collector of the Port of New York; 1857 – 1861	Succeeded by Hiram Barney
