= Williamsburg Cemetery =

Historic cemetery in New York, United States

- U.S. National Register of Historic Places
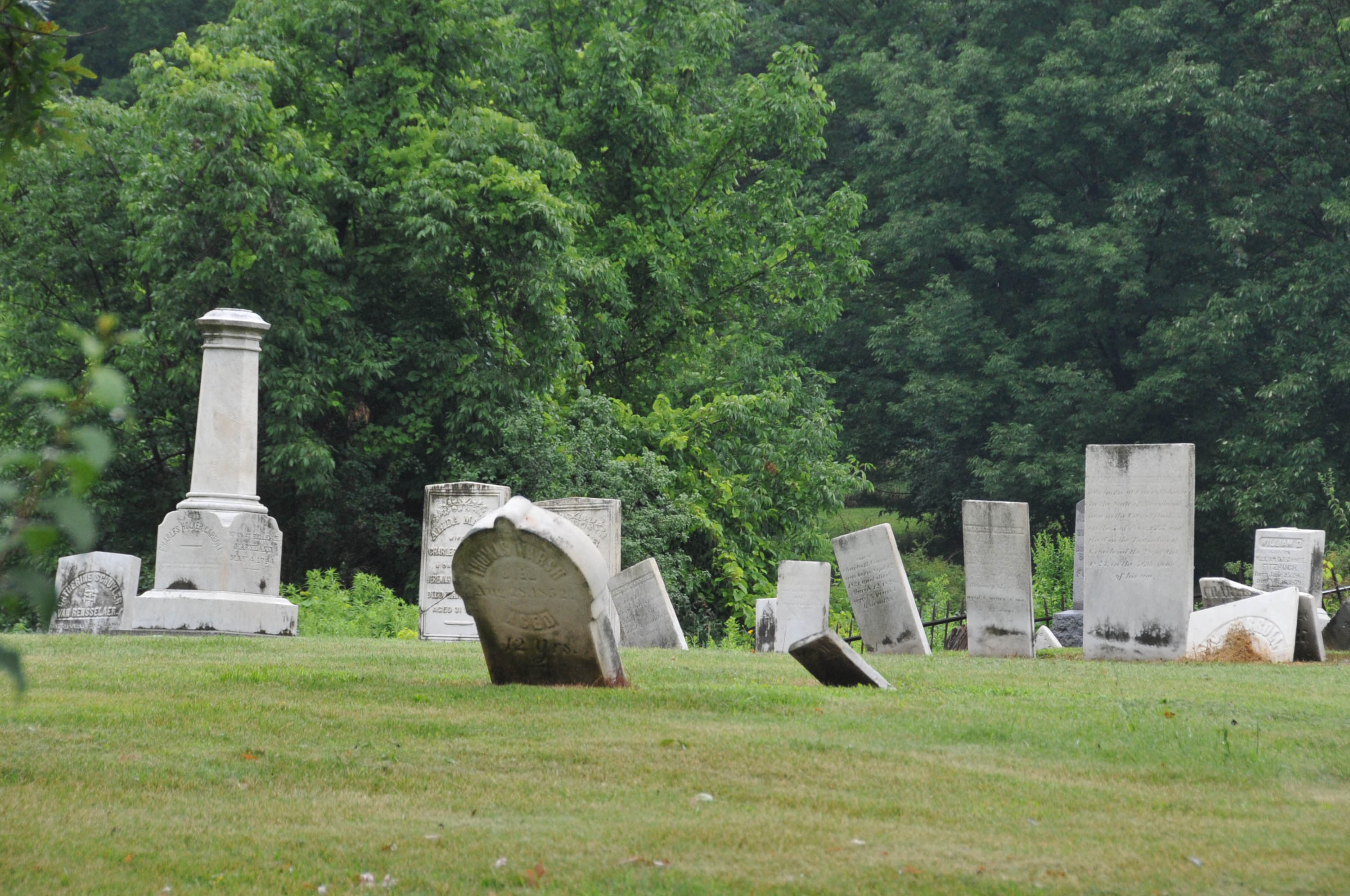

- Location within New York Location within the United States
- Location: Abel Rd., Hampton Corners, New York
- Coordinates: 42°44′54″N 77°49′55″W
- Area: 0.7 acres (0.28 ha)
- Architectural style: Cemetery
- NRHP reference No.: 02001328
- Added to NRHP: November 14, 2002

Williamsburg Cemetery is a historic cemetery located at Hampton Corners in Livingston County, New York. It was established in 1792 and is one of the earliest European American settlement period cemeteries in Western New York and is the last surviving above ground remnant of the now vanished village of Williamsburg. Williamsburg was established by Captain Charles Williamson acting in his capacity as agent for British investors in The Pulteney Association in the late 18th century. Notable burials include U.S. Representative Charles H. Carroll (1794–1865) and William Fitzhugh, an early investor in what is now Livingston County, and business partner of Colonel Nathaniel Rochester, founder of that city. It is also the final resting place of Henry Fitzhugh (1801–1866) and James G. Birney (1792–1857), son in law of William Fitzhugh and candidate for President of the United States by the Liberty Party in the 1840 and 1844 presidential elections on an abolitionist platform. Stones bear dates that range from about 1814 to about 1910 and it is an important reminder of the early settlement of the Genesee Valley.

It was listed on the National Register of Historic Places in 2002.
