= Oran Follett =

New York state assemblyman (1798–1894)

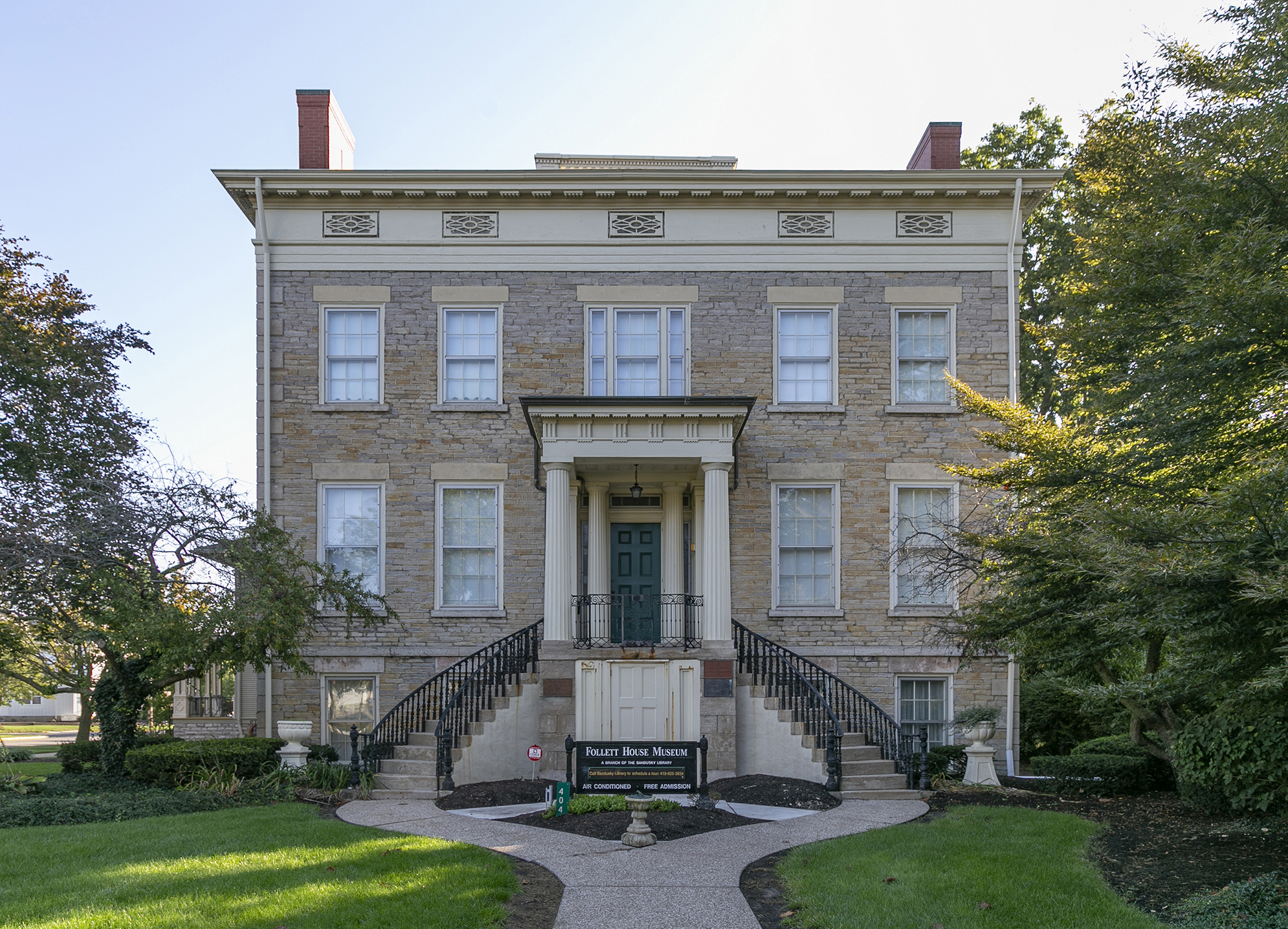
Follett's residence in Sandusky, photographed in 2021 as the Sandusky History Museum at the Follett House

Oran Follett (1798–1894) was a newspaperman in New York State and then Sandusky, Ohio. He served in the New York Assembly in 1824. In Ohio he was a newspaper editor and railroad executive. His family is prominent in Sandusky's history. His home is now the Sandusky History Museum at the Follett House, a branch of the Sandusky Library, featuring historical exhibits. A historical marker is by it.

Frederick Follett was his brother.

In 1824, he served in the 47th New York State Legislature.

In 1846, he served as Commissioner and President of the Ohio Board of Public Works in Columbus, Ohio.

His newspaper published the Lincoln–Douglas debates. He corresponded with Abraham Lincoln about political matters. The Library of Congress has a letter he wrote to Abraham Lincoln about political prospects in New York.

Several photographs of him and his family, as well as various documents, are part of the House Museum's collection. Collections of his letters related to Ohio politics and anti-slavery efforts have been published.

== Sandusky History Museum at the Follett House ==
The Sandusky History Museum at the Follett House, at 404 Wayne Street in Sandusky, was built from 1834 to 1837. It is of Neoclassical with yellow limestone. The building is a library branch with memorabilia and artifacts from Sandusky's history. The collection includes materials related to Johnson's Island and its use a prisoner of war camp for Confederate soldiers. The home has been part of the holiday season candlelight tour of homes.
