= Lewis Tappan Barney =

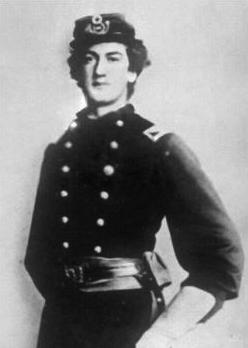
- Col. Lewis T. Barney
- Born: March 18, 1844; Brooklyn, New York
- Died: December 19, 1904 (aged 60); Inglewood, California
- Burial place: Rosedale Cemetery, Los Angeles, California
- Spouse: Mary S. Fowler
- Relatives: Hiram Barney (father)
- Military career
- Allegiance: United States of America; Union
- Branch: United States Army; Union Army
- Service years: 1862–1865
- Rank: Captain; Colonel (temporary); Brevet Major General
- Units: 7th New York Militia Regiment; 68th New York Infantry Regiment
- Commands: 180th New York Infantry Regiment (temporary)
- Conflicts: American Civil War

Lewis Tappan Barney (March 18, 1844 – December 19, 1904) was an officer in the Union Army during the American Civil War. Born in 1844 he became the youngest man brevetted to brigadier general and major general in the war.

== Life and Service ==
Lewis Tappan Barney was born in the city of Brooklyn, New York on March 18, 1844 as child of New York lawyer Hiram Barney and his wife Susannah A. Tappan. Growing up with his five siblings Barney became a hotel clerk and tried his luck as a viticulturist.

In 1862, after the American Civil War raged for a year, Barney joined the 7th New York Militia Regiment (Company F) as a Private for 90-day service. In October he joined the 68th New York Infantry Regiment (Company G). At the time present the 68th Infantry was part of the Army of the Potomac's XI Corps and, in the brigade of Alexander Schimmelfennig, was posted in the Washington defenses. A month later Barney, who was listed in some rosters as John Barney, was commissioned a 1st Lieutenant.

In February 1864 Barney was promoted to captain and assigned to the staff of General Rufus Saxton. He functioned as an assistant-adjutant general to the forces stationed in South Carolina. During summer he was offered the colonelcy of the 106th New York Infantry Regiment, but he declined. Instead he tried to raise the 180th New York Infantry. However the regiment failed to muster when it draw only enough men for a company; and in February 1865 the regiment was disorganized (its men being transferred to the 179th New York). On March 13, 1865, still only 20 years old, he was brevetted both Brigadier and Major General of the U.S. Volunteers for "gallant and meritorious services during the war".

After the war Barney settled in California and married his wife, Mary S. Fowler, in 1875. He died in Inglewood on December 19, 1904; and is buried on Rosedale Cemetery, Los Angeles (now Angelus-Rosedale Cemetery).

== See also ==
- List of American Civil War brevet generals (Union)
