= Darius Clark =

American physician

Darius Clark (April 19, 1798 Weybridge, Addison County, Vermont - January 23, 1871 Canton, St. Lawrence County, New York) was an American medical doctor and politician from New York.

== Life ==
He was the thirteenth and last child of Samuel Clark (b. 1744) and Lucey Clark (b. 1750). He studied medicine at Malone, New York, and commenced practice in Canton, New York, in 1822. He was appointed Postmaster of Canton in 1843. In 1845 he was one of four coroners in St. Lawrence County. He was an Inspector of State Prisons from 1850 to 1855, elected on the Democratic ticket in 1849 and 1852, but defeated for re-election on the Hard ticket in 1855.
