= Henry S. Randall =

American politician

Henry Stephens Randall (May 3, 1811 – August 14, 1876 Cortland, Cortland County, New York) was an American agriculturist, writer, educator and politician who served as New York Secretary of State.

== Life ==
He was the son of General Roswell Randall and Harriet (Stephens) Randall, of Shelburne, Vermont. He came as a young boy from Madison County, New York to Cortland.

He wrote many articles for agricultural periodicals, and Sheep Husbandry, the "sheepman's bible" of the times, as well as books on the subject including The Practical Shepherd, first published in 1863.

On February 4, 1834, Randall married in Auburn, New York, Jane Rebecca Polhemus, the daughter of Rev. Henry Polhemus and Jane (Anderson) Polhemus. They had a son, Roswell Stephens Randall (born November 8, 1834) who married Mary Forby, of Albany, New York. Henry's son Francis died on June 29, 1844, aged 21 months. His daughter Hattie S. Randall married D. J. Mosher, MD, on June 18, 1872.

In November 1849, he ran for Secretary of State on the Democratic ticket but was defeated by Whig Christopher Morgan. He was Secretary of State of New York from 1852 to 1853, elected in November 1851.

Randall wrote The Life of Thomas Jefferson, published in three volumes in 1858. He was the only biographer permitted to interview Jefferson’s immediate family. In a letter to James Parton he relates that the family believed Jefferson's nephew Peter Carr was the father of Sally Hemings's children.

Randall was a delegate to the 1860 Democratic National Convention; and a member of the New York State Assembly (Cortland Co.) in 1871.

He was buried at the Cortland Rural Cemetery.

== Sources ==
- His letter to James Parton about Thomas Jefferson, FRONTLINE, PBS
- His daughter's marriage at Vital Statistics for Cortland County, transcribed from The Cortland County Standard
- His son Francis's death at Vital statistics of Cortland County, transcribed from Cortland Democrat
- Short bio at Cortland History
- Obituary note of his sister Lucy Maria Randall Hoes, July 30, 1898, The New York Times

== External links to Works ==
- The Life of Thomas Jefferson, Volume 1, (EPUB format)
- The Life of Thomas Jefferson, Volume 2
- The Life of Thomas Jefferson, Volume 3, (EPUB format)
- Address, Ohio Wool Growers Association, January 6, 1864

Political offices
| Preceded by Christopher Morgan | Secretary of State of New York; 1852–1853 | Succeeded by Elias W. Leavenworth |
New York State Assembly
| Preceded by Charles Foster | New York State Assembly; Cortland County; 1871 | Succeeded by Dan C. Squires |
