= Alexander H. Wells =

American politician

Alexander H. Wells (died December 21, 1857, in Sing Sing, Westchester County, New York) was an American lawyer, editor and politician from New York.

== Life ==
He was born in Cambridge, Washington County, New York, as the son of Daniel Wells who had removed there from Hebron, Connecticut.

He was Surrogate of Westchester County from 1840 to 1844.

He published the Hudson River Chronicle at the village of Sing Sing, and the Troy Daily Times. In his papers he attacked the conditions of the prisoners in Sing Sing State Prison.

At the New York state election, 1848, he was elected on the Whig ticket an Inspector of State Prisons. He was in office from 1849 to 1851, but was defeated for re-election in 1851.

== Sources ==
- The New York Civil List compiled by Franklin Benjamin Hough (pages 45 and 419; Weed, Parsons and Co., 1858)
