= Charles Foster (New York politician) =

American politician (1823–1877)

- Born: September 2, 1823; Lansingburgh, US
- Died: May 23, 1877 (aged 53); Cortland, New York, US
- Education: Yale College
- Occupations: Lawyer and politician

Charles Foster (September 2, 1823 – May 23, 1877) was an American lawyer and politician. He served in the New York State Assembly in 1870.

== Early life ==
Foster was born in Lansingburgh, Rensselaer County, on September 2, 1823. He was the son of Nathaniel and Elizabeth Foster. In 1836, his parents moved to Pompey, Onondaga County, New York, where he prepared for college.

Foster graduated from Yale College in 1844. He studied law with Hon. Victor Birdseye of Pompey; the Hon. B. D. Noxon, of Syracuse, New York; and the Hon. John Van Buren of Albany, New York.

== Career ==
In October 1847, Foster was admitted to the bar, but due to health issues, he was advised to pursue a more active life. He worked in the cattle trade until January 1853, when he began practicing law in Cortland, New York, where he remained until he died

Foster partnered with R. H. Duell in Cortland from January 1857 until 1874, when failing health forced him to retire from his profession. He was a member of the New York State Assembly in 1870 as a Republican. From November 1875 to February 1877, he was employed as an examiner in the U. S. Patent Office.

== Personal life ==
On October 13, 1853, he married Jane M. Fowler. She was the daughter of Richard G. Fowler of Cortland, New York. The couple had no children.

Foster suffered from pulmonary problems for several years and spent three winters in Washington, but without significant improvement. Foster died of consumption in Cortland on May 23, 1877, at the age of 53.

New York State Assembly
Preceded by Hiram Whitmarsh	New York State Assembly; Cortland County; 1870	Succeeded by Henry S. Randall
