= Richard Schell =

American politician

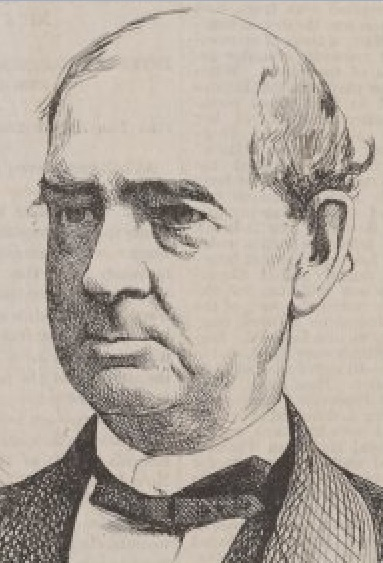
- Photograph of Schell by Rockwood

Member of the U.S. House of Representatives from New York's 9th district
- In office December 7, 1874 – March 3, 1875
- Preceded by: David B. Mellish
- Succeeded by: Fernando Wood

Member of the New York State Senate
- In office January 1, 1858 – December 31, 1859
- Preceded by: Erastus Brooks
- Succeeded by: Benjamin F. Manierre

Personal details
- Born: May 15, 1810 Rhinebeck, New York, U.S.
- Died: November 10, 1879 (aged 69) New York City, New York, U.S.
- Resting place: Old Dutch Cemetery in Rhinebeck
- Spouse: Helen Lott Jerome
- Relations: Augustus Schell (brother); Edward Schell (brother); Leonard Jerome (brother-in-law)
- Parent(s): Christian Schell; Elizabeth Hughes

Richard Schell (May 15, 1810 – November 10, 1879) was an American politician who represented New York in the United States House of Representatives from 1874 to 1875.

== Early life ==
Schell was born in Rhinebeck, New York on May 15, 1810. He was the son of Christian Schell (1779–1825), a merchant, and Elizabeth (née Hughes) Schell (1783–1866). He was the brother of Augustus Schell (1812–1884), Robert Schell (1815–1900), and Edward Schell (1819–1893), who were well-known business men of New York City.

His paternal grandparents were Richard Schell and Anna (née Schultz) Schell.

== Career ==
He completed preparatory studies and engaged in mercantile pursuits before he moved to New York City in 1830 and became a wholesale dry-goods merchant. Schell was also an agent and lobbyist for Cornelius Vanderbilt.

=== Political career ===
He was a member of the New York State Senate (6th D.) in 1858 and 1859.

Schell was elected as a Democrat to the Forty-third Congress to fill the vacancy caused by the death of David B. Mellish and served from December 7, 1874, to March 3, 1875. After leaving Congress, he resumed mercantile pursuits.

== Personal life ==
Schell was married to Helen Lott Jerome (1820–1890), the daughter of Aurora Murray (1785–1867) and Isaac Jerome (1786–1866). She was also the sister of Leonard Jerome, the prominent financier, and the aunt of Jennie Jerome, an American who later became Lady Randolph Churchill when she married Lord Randolph Churchill, the parents of U.K. Prime Minister Winston Churchill.

== Death and burial ==
Schell died in New York City in 1879, and was buried in the Old Dutch Cemetery in Rhinebeck.

== In popular culture ==
In the 2012 film Lincoln, the character of Richard Schell was portrayed by actor Tim Blake Nelson. He was shown lobbying for votes from Democratic House members to obtain passage of the Thirteenth Amendment to the United States Constitution.

New York State Senate
Preceded by Erastus Brooks	New York State Senate; 6th District; 1858–1859	Succeeded by Benjamin F. Manierre
U.S. House of Representatives
Preceded by David B. Mellish	Member of the U.S. House of Representatives from New York's 9th congressional district 1874–1875	Succeeded by Fernando Wood
