= Noyes Barber =

American politician

Member of the U.S. House of Representatives from Connecticut's at-large district
- In office March 4, 1821 – March 3, 1835
- Preceded by: Elisha Phelps
- Succeeded by: Isaac Toucey

Member of the Connecticut House of Representatives
- In office 1818

Personal details
- Born: April 28, 1781 Groton
- Died: January 3, 1844 (aged 62) Groton
- Resting place: Starr Cemetery, Groton
- Party: Democratic
- Spouse: Catherine Burdick Barber
- Children: 3
- Occupation: Merchant, lawyer, politician

Military service
- Allegiance: Connecticut; United States
- Unit: 8th Connecticut Regiment
- Battles/wars: War of 1812

Noyes Barber (April 28, 1781 – January 3, 1844) was an American military veteran and politician who served seven terms as a United States representative from Connecticut from 1821 to 1835.

== Biography ==
Barber was born in Groton, Connecticut son of John and Elizabeth (Denison) Barber. He attended the common schools and engaged in mercantile pursuits. He was a major of the Eighth Connecticut Regiment in the War of 1812 where he was detailed to defend the coast towns during the blockade by the British Fleet. He married Catherine Burdick in 1801 and they had two children, Adelaide Barber & Betsey Ann Barber Copp. Catherine died in 1813 and he married Mary Chester Smith in 1814 and they had two children, Mary Elizabeth Barber Whitman and John Starr Barber.

== Career ==
Barber was a member of the Connecticut State House of Representatives in 1818.

=== Congress ===
He was elected as a Democratic-Republican to the Seventeenth Congress, an Adams-Clay Republican to the Eighteenth, an Adams candidate to the Nineteenth and Twentieth, and an Anti-Jacksonian to the Twenty-first through the Twenty-third Congresses, serving from March 4, 1821 to March 3, 1835. He was an unsuccessful candidate for reelection in 1834 to the Twenty-fourth Congress.

=== After Congress ===
He resumed mercantile pursuits and was also a member of all Whig conventions from 1836.

== Death ==
Barber died in Groton on January 3, 1844 (age 62 years, 250 days). He is interred at Starr Cemetery, Groton, Connecticut. He was the uncle of both Edwin Barber Morgan and Christopher Morgan. Both of these men served as Representatives in the United States Congress.
