= Edward Schell =

American merchant and banker

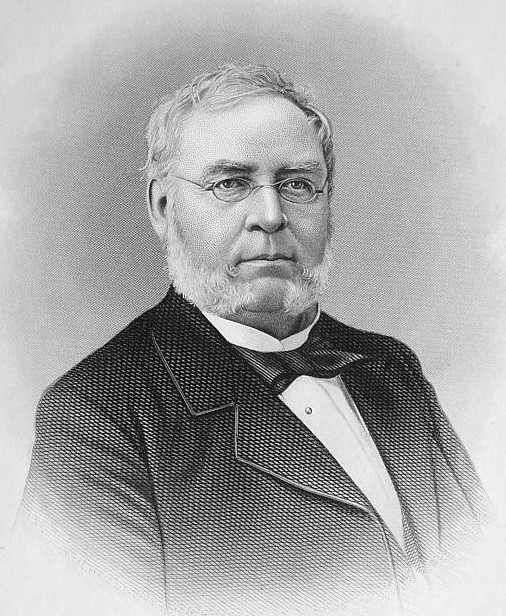

30th President of the Saint Nicholas Society of the City of New York
- In office 1889–1889
- Preceded by: John Cruger Mills
- Succeeded by: James William Beekman Jr.

Personal details
- Born: November 5, 1819 Rhinebeck, New York, U.S.
- Died: December 24, 1893 (aged 74) New York City, New York, U.S.
- Resting place: Woodlawn Cemetery
- Spouse: Jane Lamberson Heartt (m. 1847; died 1880)
- Relations: Richard Schell (brother); Augustus Schell (brother)
- Parent(s): Christian Schell; Elizabeth Hughes

Edward Schell (November 5, 1819 – December 24, 1893) was an American merchant and banker.

== Early life ==
Schell was born on November 5, 1819, in Rhinebeck, New York.

He was one of four brothers born to Christian Schell (1779–1825), a merchant, and Elizabeth (née Hughes) Schell (1783–1866).

He was the brother of U.S. Representative Richard Schell; Collector of the Port of New York Augustus Schell; and Robert Schell, a well-known businessman of New York City.

His paternal grandparents were Richard Schell and Anna (née Schultz) Schell.

He was first educated at the Starr Institute in Rhinebeck, which he left at the age of ten years.

== Career ==
As a child, Schell began his career with Littlefield & Shaw, an Irish linen importer in New York City. After a few years' service, he was sent to England to represent the house and, at the age of twenty-six, he became a junior member of Lewis S. Fellows & Schell in New York, which later became known as Schell, Fellows & Co. He was with the jewelry firm for twenty years until it dissolved.

He later entered the banking world with the Manhattan Savings Institution, serving as a trustee, treasurer and, beginning in 1876, president for over thirty years. He was president of the bank during its robbery on October 27, 1878.

Schell also served as a trustee of the Union Trust Company, a director of the National Citizens Bank, the Manhattan Life Insurance Company, the Citizens Fire Insurance Company, the Park Fire Insurance Company, the New York Society Library, the Institution for the Blind, St. Luke's Hospital, and a governor of the Manhattan Club.

He was also a vestryman of the Church of the Ascension in New York City and a warden of Christ's Church in Rye, New York.

Schell was a life member of the New-York Historical Society and the Century Association.

In 1889, he served one term as the 30th president of the Saint Nicholas Society of the City of New York from 1882 to 1883, succeeding Edward Floyd DeLancey. He previously served as treasurer of the organization from 1871 to 1888.

== Personal life ==
In 1847, Schell was married to Jane Lamberson Heartt (1825–1880), the daughter of Jonas Coe Heartt, the mayor of Troy, New York, who later became the Speaker of the New York State Assembly. Together, they were the parents of:

- Edward Heartt Schell (1848–1910), who married Cornelia Evarts Barnes, daughter of the William Evarts Barnes, in 1886.
- Jonas Heartt Schell (1850–1852), who died young.
- Catherine Elizabeth "Kate" Schell (1855–1882), who married Samuel Cragin, a son of George D. Cragin and Lydia (née Briggs) Cragin. Their daughter, Elizabeth Schell Cragin married Harold Heartt Foley.
- Mary Emily Schell (1857–1926), who did not marry and was active in philanthropy.

=== Death ===
Schell died December 24, 1893, at his residence, 53 Clinton Place in New York City. After a funeral at the Church of the Ascension (which was attended by Cornelius Vanderbilt II, Chauncey Depew, Robert Stuyvesant, Charles A. Schermerhorn, among others), he was buried at Woodlawn Cemetery in the Bronx.
