= 106th New York Infantry Regiment =

- Active: August 27, 1862, to June 3, 1865
- Country: United States
- Allegiance: Union
- Branch: Infantry
- Engagements: Second Battle of Winchester; Bristoe Campaign; Mine Run Campaign; Battle of the Wilderness; Battle of Spotsylvania Court House; Battle of Cold Harbor; Battle of Monocacy; Shenandoah Valley Campaign; Third Battle of Winchester; Battle of Cedar Creek; Siege of Petersburg

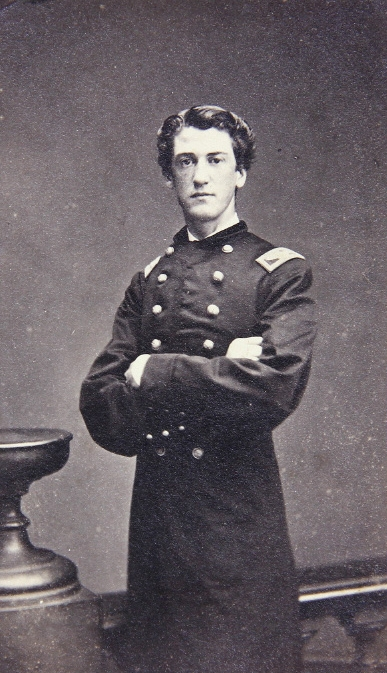
Col. Lewis T. Barney

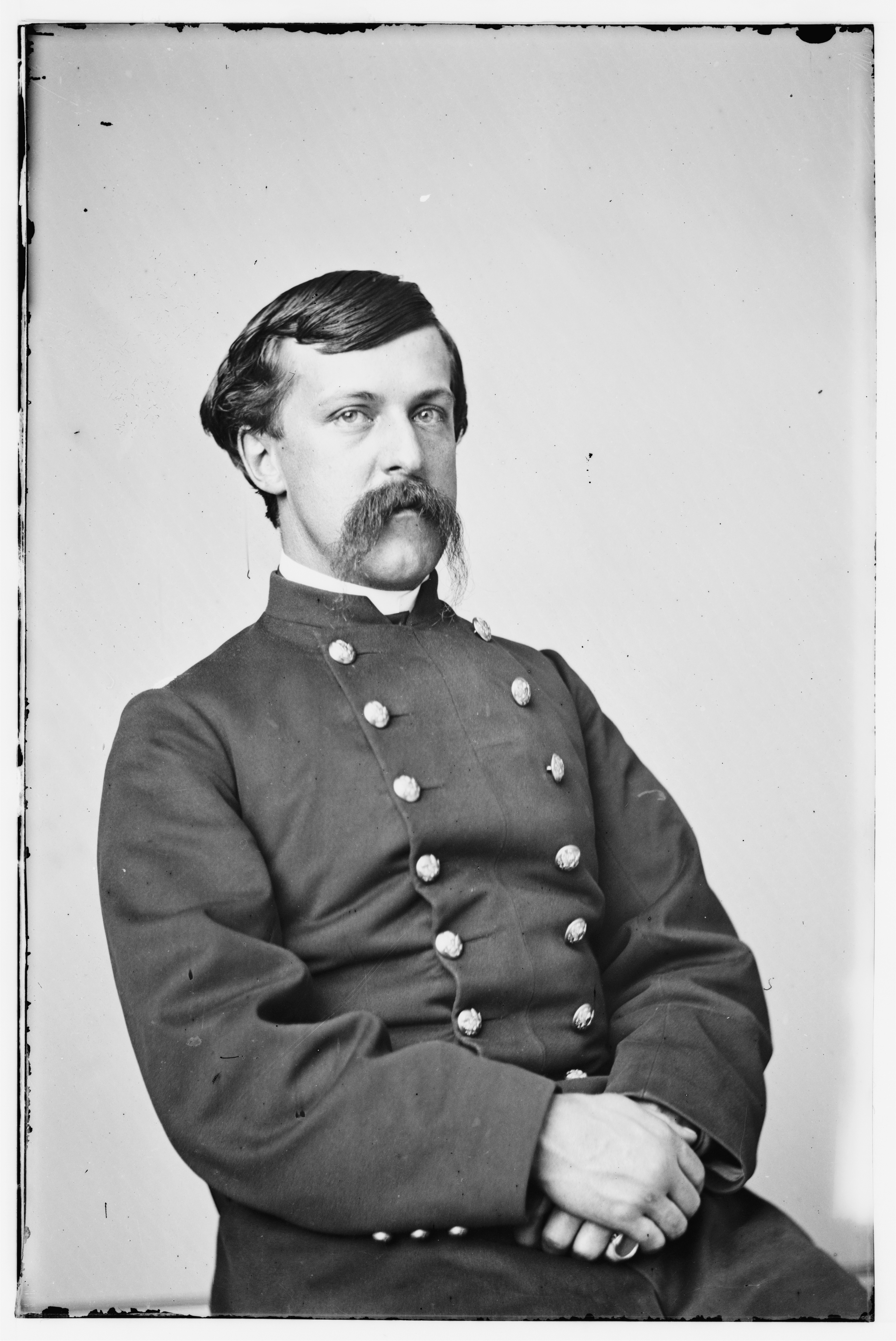
Lt. Col. Charles Townsend

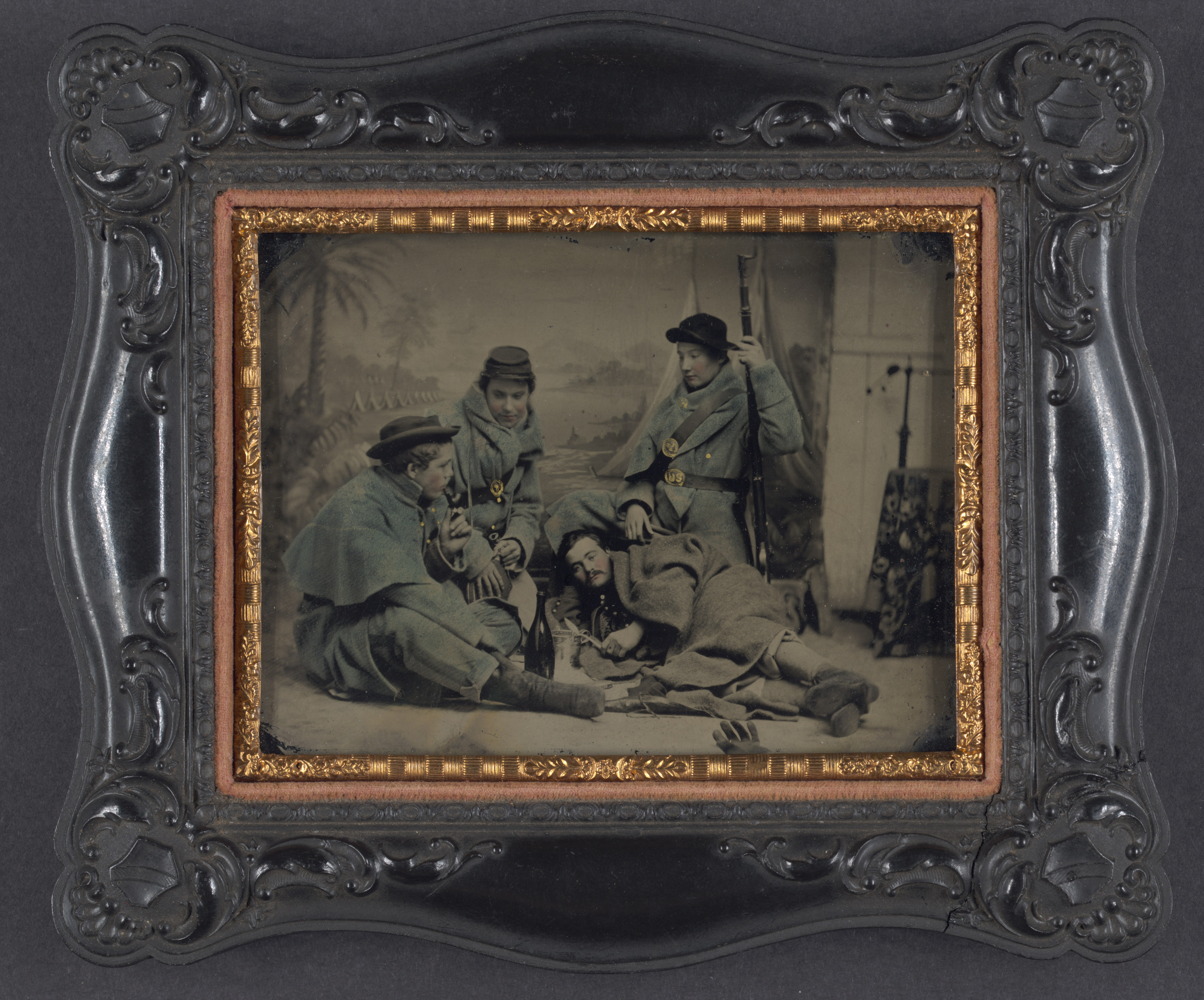
Sergeant Cornelius V. Moore of Company B, 100th New York Volunteers, a sergeant of 39th Illinois Regiment, a corporal of 106th New York Volunteers, and a private of the 11th Vermont Regiment

The 106th New York Infantry Regiment (or St. Lawrence County Regiment) was an infantry regiment in the Union Army during the American Civil War.

== Service ==
The 106th New York Infantry was organized at Ogdensburg, New York, and mustered in for three years service on August 27, 1862, under the command of Colonel Schuyler F. Judd.

The regiment was attached to Railroad District, VIII Corps, Middle Department, to September 1862. Railroad District, Western Virginia, to January 1863. Martinsburg, W. Va., Milroy's Command, VIII Corps, Middle Department, to March 1863. 3rd Brigade, 1st Division, VIII Corps, to June 1863. Elliott's Command, VIII Corps, to July 1863. 3rd Brigade, 3rd Division, III Corps, Army of the Potomac, to March 1864. 1st Brigade, 3rd Division, VI Corps, Army of the Potomac and Army of the Shenandoah, to June 1865.

The 106th New York Infantry mustered out of service on June 27, 1865.

== Detailed service ==
Left New York for Baltimore, Md., August 28, 1862, thence ordered to New Creek, Va. Guard and provost duty in defenses of the Upper Potomac, with headquarters at New Creek, Va., until June 1863. Expedition to Greenland Gap April 15–22, 1863. Fairmont April 29. Martinsburg, W. Va., June 14. Battle of Winchester, Va., and retreat to Harper's Ferry June 14–15. Guard stores to Washington, D.C., July 1–4. Joined the Army of the Potomac at Frederick, Md., July 5. Pursuit of Lee to Manassas Gap, Va., July 5–24. Action at Wapping Heights, Va., July 23. Duty on line of the Rappahannock and Rapidan until October. Bristoe Campaign October 9–22. Advance to line of the Rappahannock November 7–8. Kelly's Ford November 7. Brandy Station November 8. Mine Run Campaign November 26-December 2. Demonstration on the Rapidan February 6–7, 1864. Campaign from the Rapidan to the James May 3-June 15. Battles of the Wilderness May 5–7; Spottsylvania May 8–12; Spottsylvania Court House May 12–21. Assault on the Salient, "Bloody Angle," May 12. North Anna River May 23–26. On line of the Pamunkey May 26–28. Totopotomoy May 28–31. Cold Harbor June 1–12. Before Petersburg June 17–18. Siege of Petersburg June 17-July 6. Jerusalem Plank Road, Weldon Railroad, June 22–23, Ordered to Baltimore, Md., July 6. Battle of Monocacy, Md., July 9. Expedition to Snicker's Gap, Va., July 14–24. Sheridan's Shenandoah Valley Campaign August 7-November 28. Near Charlestown August 21–22. Battle of Winchester September 19. Fisher's Hill September 22. Battle of Cedar Creek October 19. Duty at Kernstown until December. Moved to Washington, D.C., thence to Petersburg, Va., December 3–6. Siege of Petersburg December 1864 to April 1865. Fort Fisher, Petersburg, March 25, 1865. Appomattox Campaign March 28-April 9. Assault on and fall of Petersburg April 2. Pursuit of Lee April 3–9. Sayler's Creek April 6. Appomattox Court House April 9. Surrender of Lee and his army. March to Danville, Va., April 23–27, and duty there until May 16. Moved to Richmond, Va., thence to Washington, D.C., May 16-June 2. Corps Review June 8.

== Casualties ==
The regiment lost a total of 307 men during service; 10 officers and 127 enlisted men killed or mortally wounded, 4 officers and 166 enlisted men died of disease.

== Commanders ==
- Colonel Schuyler F. Judd (August 27, 1862 – September 30, 1862)
- Colonel Edward C. James (October 1, 1862 – August 4, 1863)
- Colonel Frederick E. Embick (August 4, 1863 – September 23, 1863, December 19, 1863 – August 2, 1864) – dismissed and then reappointed
- Colonel Lewis T. Barney (August 3, 1864 – December 20, 1864)
- Colonel Andrew N. McDonald (February 1, 1865 – June 22, 1865)
- Lieutenant Colonel Charles Townsend – commanded at the battles of the Wilderness and Cold Harbor (killed in action)
- Captain (later Major) Edward M. Paine – commanded at the battle of Monocacy (wounded in action)

== Notable members ==
- 2nd Lieutenant Thomas Hedge, Company G - U.S. Representative from Iowa, 1899–1907

== See also ==
- List of New York Civil War regiments
- New York in the Civil War
