= John J. Bradley =

American politician and Tweed Ring member (1831–1891)

City Chamberlain and County Treasurer of New York City
- In office April 1870 – January 6, 1872
- Preceded by: Peter B. Sweeny

Member of the New York Senate from the 7th district
- In office 1868–1871
- Preceded by: Thomas Murphy
- Succeeded by: James O'Brien

Member of the New York Senate from the 6th district
- In office 1862–1863
- Preceded by: Benjamin F. Manierre
- Succeeded by: William Laimbeer Jr.

Member of the New York City Board of Aldermen from the 14th District
- In office 1858–1859

Member of the New York City Common Council from the 57th District
- In office 1856–1856

Personal details
- Born: 1831 New York City, New York, U.S.
- Died: August 24, 1891 (aged 59–60) Mahopac, Putnam County, New York, U.S.
- Party: Democratic
- Occupation: Livery stable owner, politician

John J. Bradley (1831 – August 24, 1891) was an American politician from New York and a member of the infamous Tweed Ring. He served in the New York State Senate from 1862 to 1863 and again from 1868 to 1871, and as City Chamberlain and County Treasurer of New York City from 1870 to 1872.

== Early life and business career ==
Bradley was born in 1831 in New York City. He ran a large livery yard on the corner of Fourth Avenue and 18th Street in Manhattan.

== Political career ==
Bradley was a member of the New York City Common Council (57th District) in 1856 and a member of the New York City Board of Aldermen (14th District) in 1858 and 1859.

He was a member of the New York State Senate (6th District) in 1862 and 1863.

He was again a member of the New York State Senate (7th District) from 1868 to 1871, sitting in the 89th, 90th, 91st, and 92nd New York State Legislatures.

=== Tweed Ring involvement ===
Bradley was a member of the notorious Tweed Ring, the corrupt political organization led by William M. Tweed that controlled New York City government in the late 1860s and early 1870s.

In April 1870, he succeeded his brother-in-law Peter B. Sweeny as City Chamberlain and County Treasurer, and remained in office until January 6, 1872, when he resigned.

In October 1871, the New York Times published a critical article about Bradley, and in November 1871, they published "Six Reasons for Voting Against John J. Bradley."

== Later life and death ==
After resigning from office, Bradley resumed his business and moved his stable to 8 East 31st Street.

He died on August 24, 1891, in Mahopac, Putnam County, New York, at the age of 60.

New York State Senate
Preceded by Benjamin F. Manierre	New York State Senate; 6th District; 1862–1863	Succeeded by William Laimbeer Jr.
Preceded by Thomas Murphy	New York State Senate; 7th District; 1868–1871	Succeeded by James O'Brien
