= Henry Fitzhugh (assemblyman) =

American politician

Henry Fitzhugh (August 7, 1801 "The Hive", Washington County, Maryland – August 11, 1866) was an American merchant, businessman and politician from New York.

== Life ==
He was the son of Col. William Fitzhugh, Jr. (1761–1839, one of the founders of Rochester, New York) and Ann (Hughes) Fitzhugh (1771–1829). Baptised and raised in Saint John's Parish, Henry removed with the Fitzhugh family at the age of 15 to a tract of the Phelps and Gorham Purchase in 1816. On December 11, 1827, Henry married Elizabeth Barbara Carroll (1806–1866, sister of Charles H. Carroll) at Groveland, New York.

He was a member of the New York State Assembly (Oswego Co.) in 1849. He was a Canal Commissioner from 1852 to 1857, elected on the Whig ticket in the New York state election, 1851 and New York state election, 1854.

He was buried at the Williamsburg Cemetery in Groveland, NY.

U.S. presidential candidates James G. Birney and Gerrit Smith, and State Senator Frederick F. Backus (1794–1858), were his brothers-in-law.

== Sources ==
- Official State Canvass, in NYT on January 1, 1852
- The Charges against Henry Fitzhugh, in NYT on April 4, 1853
- Whig Convention, in NYT on September 21, 1854, nominating Fitzhugh for re-election
- The New York Civil List compiled by Franklin Benjamin Hough (pages 42, 237 and 273; Weed, Parsons and Co., 1858)
- Fitzhugh genealogy in Upstate Arcadia: Landscape, Aesthetics, and the Triumph of Social Differentiation in America by Peter J. Hugill (Rowman & Littlefield, 1995, ISBN 0-8476-7856-3, ISBN 978-0-8476-7856-3 ; page 50)
- Political Graveyard
- Transcriptions from Gravestones, at RootsWeb
- Fitzhugh genealogy

New York State Assembly
Preceded by M. Lindley Lee	New York State Assembly; Oswego County, 1st District; 1849	Succeeded by William Lewis, Jr.
