= Jonas C. Heartt =

American politician

Speaker of the New York State Assembly
- In office 1852–1852
- Preceded by: Joseph B. Varnum Jr.
- Succeeded by: William H. Ludlow

Personal details
- Born: August 12, 1793 Troy, Rensselaer County, New York, U.S.
- Died: April 30, 1874 (aged 80) New York City, New York County, New York, U.S.
- Party: Whig
- Spouse: Catherine Lamberson (after 1814)
- Relations: Edward Schell (son-in-law)

Jonas Coe Heartt (August 12, 1793 - April 30, 1874) was an American businessman and politician.

== Early life ==
Heartt was born on August 12, 1793, in Troy, Rensselaer County, New York. He was the son of Philip Heartt, and was the first child baptized by the first pastor of the Troy First Presbyterian church, and for this reason he was given the name of the pastor, Jonas Coe.

== Career ==
In 1822, he was elected assistant alderman for the Second Ward. He was also supervisor of this ward for 1833, 1835 and 1836, and in 1838 he was elected Mayor of Troy by the City Council. He was re-elected each following year until 1843, and was the first mayor elected by popular vote, in 1840. During his mayoralty measures were adopted for building the Schenectady and Troy Railroad. It was through the united efforts of Mayor Heartt and Jonathan Edwards that Troy was made the terminus instead of a branch of the Hudson River Railroad. He was instrumental in having a direct line of steamboats from Troy to New York, and for twelve years was a director in the River Steamboat Association. He was a director of the Troy and Boston Railroad from the time of its construction until his death.

In 1852, he was a Whig member of the New York State Assembly and was elected Speaker.

== Personal life ==
On August 30, 1814, he married Catherine Lamberson. Together, they were the parents of many children, including:

- Jane Lamberson Heartt (1825–1880), who married banker Edward Schell.

Heartt died on April 30, 1874, in New York City.

New York State Assembly
Preceded by George Lesley	New York State Assembly; Rensselaer County, 1st District; 1852	Succeeded by Jason C. Osgood
Political offices
Preceded by Joseph B. Varnum Jr.	Speaker of the New York State Assembly; 1852	Succeeded by William H. Ludlow
