= Charles H. Carroll =

American politician

Charles Holker Carroll

Member of the U.S. House of Representatives from New York's 29th district
- In office March 4, 1843 – March 3, 1847
- Preceded by: Seth Merrill Gates
- Succeeded by: Robert L. Rose

Member of the New York State Assembly from Livingston Co.
- In office 1836–1836; 1842–1842

Member of the New York State Senate
- In office 1827 – March 1828
- Preceded by: John Bowman
- Succeeded by: George H. Boughton

Personal details
- Born: May 4, 1794 Hagerstown, Maryland
- Died: July 22, 1865 (aged 71) Groveland, New York
- Resting place: Williamsburg Cemetery
- Party: Whig
- Spouse: Alida Maria Van Rensselaer (m. 1820; died 1832)
- Relations: Henry Fitzhugh (brother-in-law); Samuel S. Carroll (nephew)
- Children: 6
- Parent(s): Charles Carroll; Anne Sprigg
- Education: St. Mary's College (1813)

Charles Holker Carroll (May 4, 1794 – July 22, 1865) was an American farmer and politician from New York who was a descendant of the Carrolls of Carrollton and married into the Van Rensselaer family.

== Early life ==
Carroll was born on May 4, 1794, in Hagerstown, Maryland. He was the son of Charles Carroll of Bellevue (1767–1823) and Anne Sprigg (1769–1837). His siblings included William Thomas Carroll and Elizabeth Barbara Carroll (1806–1866), who was married to Henry Fitzhugh (1801–1866), an Erie Canal Commissioner and member of the New York State Assembly and the sister of Ann Carroll Fitzhugh, wife of Gerrit Smith.

Carroll's paternal grandfather was Charles Carroll of Duddington (1729–1773), himself the grandson of Charles Carroll (1661-1720), a native of Ireland who emigrated to Maryland in 1689. His grandfather was the nephew of Charles Carroll of Annapolis and a cousin of Charles Carroll of Carrollton, a signor of the Declaration of Independence.

Along with his parents, the Carroll family left Maryland for Genesee County, New York, in 1811. Carroll graduated from St. Mary's College in Baltimore, Maryland, in 1813.

== Career ==
He was a member of the New York State Senate (8th D.) from 1827 to 1828, sitting in the 50th and 51st New York State Legislatures. He resigned his seat in March 1828.

He was a member of the New York State Assembly (Livingston Co.) in 1836. He was Chairman of the Whig state convention of 1842. Carroll was known as an admirer of Henry Clay.

He was elected as a Whig to the 28th and 29th United States Congresses, holding office from March 4, 1843, to March 3, 1847. Caroll was not a candidate for renomination in 1846.

=== Later life ===
After retiring from Congress, Carroll returned to Groveland and managed his large landed estate, "The Hermitage". He was presidential elector on the American Party ticket in 1856.

== Personal life ==
Carroll was married to Alida Maria Van Rensselaer (1801–1832) the daughter of Jeremiah Van Rensselaer (1769–1829). Alida was the niece of Jacob Rutsen Van Rensselaer and the granddaughter of Robert Van Rensselaer (1740–1802). Her older sister, Cornelia Rutsen Van Rensselaer (b. 1798), was married to Rep. Francis Granger. They lived at a homestead known as "The Hermitage" in Groveland, New York. Together, they were the parents of six children, only two of which survived to maturity:

- Henry Carroll (1821–1828), who died young.
- Charles Carroll (1823–1830), who died young.
- Cornelia Granger Carroll (1826–1909), who married Edward Philo Fuller (1820–1866), son of Congressman Philo C. Fuller, in 1850.
- Anne Elizabeth Carroll (1828–1905), who married William Dana Fitzhugh (1824–1889), son of Dr. Daniel H. Fitzhugh and nephew of Henry Fitzhugh, in 1849.
- Adeline V. Carroll (1830–1860), who died unmarried.
- Alida Carroll (1831–1831), who died young.

After his wife's early death in 1832, her sister, Catharine Schuyler Van Rensselaer (1802–1873), who never married, lived at "The Hermitage" and acted as a second mother to the Carroll girls.

Carroll died in Groveland on July 22, 1865. He was buried at the Williamsburg Cemetery in Groveland.

=== Descendants ===
Through his daughter Cornelia, he was the grandfather of Sophia Fuller (b. 1854) who married Edwin Forrest Sweet (1847–1935), a Congressman and Mayor of Grand Rapids, Michigan (from 1904 to 1905) and Philo Carroll Fuller (1857–1931), who also served as Mayor of Grand Rapids in 1917. The Sweets were the parents of Carroll Fuller Sweet (b. 1877), George Sweet (b. 1881), Sidney Edward Sweet (b. 1883), Cornelia Van Rensselaer Sweet (b. 1886), Sophia Fuller Sweet (b. 1892).

Through his daughter Anne, he was the grandfather of Anne Fitzhugh (b. 1850), Alida Catharine Fitzhugh, who died in Texas, Carroll Fitzhugh (d. 1880), Cornelia F. Fitzhugh, who married Richard Field Conover (1858–1930), Edward F. Fitzhugh, a chemist.

== See also ==
- Carroll family

New York State Senate
Preceded by John Bowman	New York State Senate; Eighth District (Class 4); 1827 - 1828	Succeeded by George H. Boughton
U.S. House of Representatives
Preceded by Seth Merrill Gates	Member of the U.S. House of Representatives from New York's 29th congressional district 1843 - 1847	Succeeded by Robert L. Rose
