= William H. Ludlow =

American politician from New York

William Handy Ludlow

Speaker of the New York State Assembly
- In office January 1 – December 31, 1853
- Preceded by: Jonas C. Heartt
- Succeeded by: Robert H. Pruyn

Member of the New York State Assembly from Suffolk Co.
- In office January 1 – December 31, 1853
- Preceded by: Zopher B. Oakley
- Succeeded by: William S. Preston

Personal details
- Born: 2 April 1821 Yonkers, New York, U.S.
- Died: 26 September 1890 (aged 69) Oakdale, New York, U.S.
- Party: Democratic
- Spouse: Frances Louisa Nicoll (m. 1841; died 1887)
- Children: 6,
- Parent(s): Ezra Ludlow; Rachel Seguine
- Relatives: William Ludlow (son)

Military service
- Allegiance: United States of America: Union
- Branch/service: Union Army
- Years of service: 1861–1866
- Rank: Lieutenant Colonel; Brevet Major General
- Unit: 73rd New York Infantry
- Battles/wars: American Civil War

William Handy Ludlow (April 2, 1821 – September 26, 1890) was an American politician. He was also an officer in the Union Army during the American Civil War.

== Early life ==
Ludlow was born on April 2, 1821, in Yonkers, New York. He was the son of Ezra Ludlow (1786–1861) and Rachel Seguine (1788–1864), who married in Staten Island on February 6, 1808. His father was the architect and builder of the University of the City of New York building.

He was a direct descendant of Roger Ludlow (1590–1664), who was elected deputy governor of the Massachusetts Bay Colony and lieutenant governor of Connecticut and was the first in the family to settle in North America. His paternal grandfather, Obadiah Ludlow (Ludlam), an officer of the New Jersey troops during the American Revolution, was George Washington's right hand man throughout the War. Dr. Charles Stedman Bull was the son of Ludlow's first cousin, Henry King Bull. Ludlow's 4th great-grandfather, William Ludlam Sr.(1605-1665), arrived in Southampton, Long Island, about 1653. Ludlam's will is the first recorded will in New York City history.

Ludlow graduated from New York University.

== Career ==
He was a Democratic member from Suffolk County of the New York State Assembly in 1853 during the 76th New York State Legislature. During that session, Ludlow was elected speaker of the Assembly with 85 votes against 39 for Jeremiah Ellsworth, the Whig candidate. During his time as speaker, Governor Horatio Seymour vetoed the "Bill for Extension of the Basis of Banking Capital".

In 1854, he ran for lieutenant governor of New York on the ticket with Horatio Seymour, but was defeated.

He was a delegate to the 1860 Democratic National Convention.

=== War service ===
He joined the 73rd New York Volunteer Infantry as a 2nd lieutenant, and was soon attached to the staff of Major General John Adams Dix and promoted to lieutenant colonel and aide-de-camp to the general.

At the end of the Civil War, he was the agent for exchange of prisoners at Fort Monroe, Virginia, and was brevetted brigadier general and major general, US Volunteers, on March 13, 1865, for "faithful and meritorious services during the war".

=== Later career ===
In 1866, he was appointed as part of the State Central Committee for the State of New York to the National Union State Central Committee, representing Suffolk County. Despite his retirement from politics, he continued to attend political events.

After the war, starting in 1868, he was president of the Tontine Life Insurance Company of New York.

== Personal life ==
On December 9, 1841, he married Frances Louisa Nicoll (1822–1887), daughter of William Nicoll (1798–1823) and Sarah Greenly, heiress of the Nicoll estate around Islip on Long Island, New York. They were the parents of six children, including:

- Nicoll Ludlow (1842–1915), an admiral with the Navy who was married to Frances Mary Thomas (1842–1873) and Mary McLean Ludlow (1846–1915).
- William Ludlow (1843–1901), who married Genevieve Almira Sprigg (1842–1926), daughter of James Rolfe Sprigg, on January 23, 1866.
- Newton Perkins Ludlow (1846–1858), who died young.
- Francis Lewis Ludlow (b. 1850)
- Louise Nicoll Ludlow (1866–1947)

In 1889, he sold "Oakdale Farm", a 400-acre (1.6 km^{2}) estate, to Frederick Gilbert Bourne.

Ludlow died on September 26, 1890, in Oakdale, New York.

Political offices
Preceded by Jonas C. Heartt	Speaker of the New York State Assembly; 1853	Succeeded by Robert H. Pruyn
