= Benjamin Welch =

American politician

Benjamin Welch Jr. (c. 1818 – April 14, 1863) was an American politician.

== Life ==
He studied law with Judge Mann in Utica, New York. Afterwards he edited the Utica Democrat and then the Buffalo Republican at Buffalo, New York.

In 1849, he ran for State Treasurer on the Democratic ticket but was defeated by the Whig/Anti-Rent candidate Alvah Hunt. In 1851, he ran again on the Democratic ticket for New York State Treasurer. This time he was defeated by James M. Cook by a margin of only 228 votes (200,693 for Cook; 200,465 for Welch Jr.), but he contested successfully the election on the ground that the ballots cast for "B. Welch", "Benjamin Welch" (without the "Jr.") and "Benjamin C. Welch Jr." (with erroneous middle initial) had not been counted, but had been cast for him. On November 20, 1852, he succeeded to the office for the remainder of the term.

In 1855, he joined the American Party, and later the Republican Party.

In 1859, he was appointed Commissary-General of the State Militia by Governor Edwin D. Morgan. In 1862 he joined the staff of General John Pope, but soon after contracted a disease of which he died on April 14, 1863, in Clifton Springs, Ontario County, New York.

== Sources ==
- Official state canvass, in NYT on January 1, 1852
- Google Books The New York Civil List compiled by Franklin Benjamin Hough (page 35; Weed, Parsons and Co., 1858)
- Know Nothing convention, in NYT on May 10, 1855
- Appointed Commissary-General, in NYT on January 13, 1859
- The People vs. James M. Cook in Reports of Cases in Law and Equity in the Supreme Court of the State of New York by Oliver L. Barbour (Vol. XIV, pages 259ff; Gould, Banks & Co., Albany NY, 1853)
- The Military and Naval History of the Rebellion in the United States by William Jewett Tenney (1865; page 749)

Political offices
Preceded by James M. Cook	New York State Treasurer; 1852–1853	Succeeded by Elbridge G. Spaulding
