= Frederick Follett =

American journalist

Frederick Follett (November 1, 1804 Lincoln, Ontario County, New York - January 18, 1891 New York City) was an American journalist, newspaper editor and politician from New York.

== Life ==
He was the son of Frederick Follett (1761–1804) and Giffie Babcock (1771–1845).

In 1819, his brother Oran Follett (member of the New York State Assembly in 1824) founded the Spirit of the Times, a weekly newspaper at Batavia, New York. In 1825, Oran removed to Buffalo, New York, and Frederick took over the paper. In 1826, Frederick married Sarah Sutherland (1806–1860), and they had three sons. In August 1836, he sold the newspaper, and went to Texas to join Sam Houston's army, but the Texas Revolution had ended before he arrived.

From 1840 to 1843, he edited the Batavia Times and Farmers and Mechanics Journal. He was Postmaster of Batavia, NY, from 1843 to 1849. In 1847, he published History of the Press of Western New-York (Rochester NY, 1847, 76 pages).

In 1847, he ran for Canal Commissioner on the Democratic ticket, but was defeated. He was a Canal Commissioner from 1850 to 1855, elected in 1849 and 1852 on the Democratic ticket.

He died at his home at 231, West One Hundred and Thirty-fifth Street in New York City.

== Sources ==
- Obit in NYT on January 20, 1891 (with a few inaccuracies)
- Gazetteer of the State of New York: Embracing a Comprehensive View of the Geography, Geology, and General History of the State, and a Complete History and Description of Every County, City, Town, Village and Locality: With Full Table of Statistics by John Homer French & Frank Place (Cortland County Historical Society, R. Pearsall Smith, 1860; page 321)
- The New York Civil List compiled by Franklin Benjamin Hough (page 42; Weed, Parsons and Co., 1858)
