= David B. Mellish =

American politician

Member of the U.S. House of Representatives from New York's 9th congressional district
- In office March 4, 1873 – May 23, 1874
- Preceded by: Fernando Wood
- Succeeded by: Richard Schell

Personal details
- Born: January 2, 1831 Oxford, Massachusetts, U.S.
- Died: May 23, 1874 (aged 43) Washington, D.C., U.S.
- Resting place: Hillside Cemetery, Auburn, Massachusetts
- Party: Republican
- Spouse: Lucy M. Fitch (m. 1862)
- Profession: Journalist; Public official

David Batcheller Mellish (January 2, 1831 – May 23, 1874) was a businessman, journalist, and public official from Oxford, Massachusetts. He became a resident of New York City, and won election to Congress in 1872. He was serving his first term as a United States representative from New York when he died in Washington, D.C.

== Early life ==
Mellish was born in Oxford, Worcester County, Massachusetts, on January 2, 1831. His mother was Cyrene Mellish, and his father, John Mellish, was a carriage-maker and teacher who moved his family to Auburn in 1839. The elder Mellish was prominent in local politics and government as a Democrat, and served as a justice of the peace for 35 years. David Mellish attended the public schools of Auburn, Leicester Academy, and Warren Academy in Woburn.

== Career ==
After completing his education, Mellish apprenticed at the Worcester Spy newspaper, where he learned printing, editing, proofreading, and news reporting. He later taught school in Massachusetts, Maryland, and Pennsylvania. In 1860, Mellish moved to New York City; he worked initially as a proofreader, and then became a reporter for the New-York Tribune. He also began a career as a stenographer with the city Police Department and Board of Health.

Mellish became active in politics as a Republican, and opposed control of the city by the Tammany Hall Democratic organization, which was widely regarded as corrupt. He served as chief supervisor of elections for the police department, but was removed because he campaigned against "Tammany Republicans"—officials who were supposedly Republicans, but who actually cooperated with Tammany Hall.

In 1871, Mellish began work for the Collector of the Port of New York; initially appointed as a clerk, he later moved up to the position of assistant appraiser. In addition, Mellish authored columns and editorials on politics for the New York Times.

== Congressman ==
In 1872, Mellish was elected as a Republican to represent New York's 9th District in the United States House of Representatives. He served in the 43rd Congress (March 4, 1873 until his death). He ran on a platform of "clean elections" and "good government", as opposed to the corruption of Tammany Hall. Press accounts of the time indicate that Mellish enjoyed support from many Democrats who liked him personally, even though he opposed them politically.

=== Monetary system ===
In Congress, Mellish responded to the Panic of 1873 by advocating a stable monetary system based on "soft money"—the concept that paper money backed by the strength and credit of the federal government would provide more stability and economic opportunity for farmers and the working class than "hard money"—gold or silver reserves in banks sufficient to allow holders of paper money to redeem their currency for specie on demand.

=== Civil rights ===
On January 10, 1874, Mellish spoke on the House floor in favor of a civil rights bill introduced by Senator Charles Sumner. Citing examples from New York court cases to desegregate streetcars and other public facilities, Mellish argued that Sumner's bill deserved passage because it would place black and white citizens on equal footing in terms of free exercise of their rights. The bill was weakened by amendments, but passed on February 4, 1875—after the deaths of both Sumner and Mellish.

== Death and burial ==
According to contemporary press accounts, in May 1874, Mellish was speaking on the House floor when he lost control of his mental faculties. His breakdown was attributed to overwork, and he was hospitalized at an asylum for the insane. Mellish did not recover, and died on May 23, 1874, 11 days after being hospitalized.

A memorial service for Mellish took place at the 50th Street Church in New York City on May 26. His funeral took place in Auburn on May 28, and he was buried at Hillside Cemetery in Auburn.

== Family ==
In 1862, Mellish was married to Lucy M. Fitch, an 1858 graduate of Mount Holyoke College. They were the parents of three children, Alice, Edwin and William.

== See also ==
- List of members of the United States Congress who died in office (1790–1899)

== Sources ==
=== Newspapers ===
- Oleson, Ellie (August 9, 2010). "19th-century rights pioneer almost forgotten in hometown; Progressive Republican congressman died in his prime". Worcester Telegram & Gazette. Worcester, MA.

=== Magazines ===
- Poore, Ben Perley (1878). "Congressional Directory: Mellish, David B." The Political Register and Congressional Directory. Boston, MA: Houghton, Osgood and Company.

== External sources ==
- United States Congress. "David B. Mellish (id: M000637)". Biographical Directory of the United States Congress.
- David B. Mellish at Find a Grave

U.S. House of Representatives
Preceded by Fernando Wood	Member of the U.S. House of Representatives from New York's 9th congressional district March 4, 1873 – May 23, 1874	Succeeded by Richard Schell
