= Benjamin F. Manierre =

American politician

Benjamin Franklin Manierre (1822 in New London County, Connecticut – June 12, 1910 in Manhattan, New York City) was an American banker and politician from New York.

== Life ==
After the death of his father, the family removed to New York City in 1829. When 12 years old, he began to work in a banking and exchange office. 25 years later he became President of the Importers' and Traders' Insurance Company.

He entered politics as a Tammany Hall Democrat, and joined the Free Soil Party in 1848, and the Republican Party upon its foundation in 1855.

He was a member of the New York State Senate (6th D.) in 1860 and 1861.

In 1866, he was elected by the State Legislature as a Metropolitan Police Commissioner.

In 1876, he was Chairman of the Liberal Republican state convention.

He died at his home, at 352 West End Avenue, Manhattan.

His sons Alfred Lee Manierre (1861–1911) and Charles E. Manierre (1859–1940) both ran on the Prohibition ticket for Governor of New York: Alfred in 1902, Charles in 1926.

== Sources ==
- The New York Civil List compiled by Franklin Benjamin Hough, Stephen C. Hutchins and Edgar Albert Werner (1867; pg. 442 and 526)
- Biographical Sketches of the State Officers and Members of the Legislature of the State of New York by William D. Murphy (1861; pg. 83ff)
- THE LIBERAL REPUBLICANS in NYT on August 24, 1876
- BENJAMIN F. MANIERRE DEAD in NYT on June 14, 1910

New York State Senate
Preceded by Richard Schell	New York State Senate; 6th District; 1860–1861	Succeeded by John J. Bradley
