= Christopher Morgan (politician) =

American politician

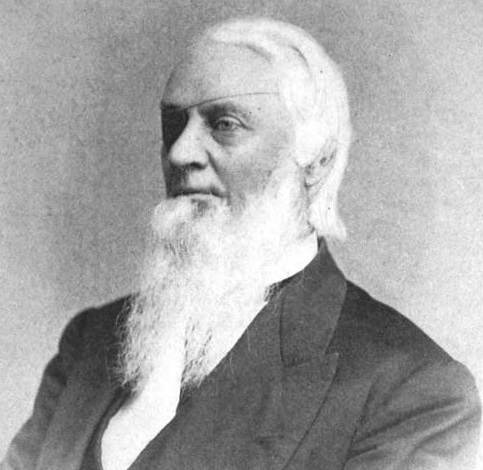
- Morgan's eye patch resulted from the loss of his right eye in a hunting accident during his college years.

Member of U.S. House of Representatives from New York's 24th district
- In office March 4, 1839 – March 3, 1843
- Preceded by: William H. Noble
- Succeeded by: Horace Wheaton

Secretary of State of New York
- In office January 1, 1848 – December 31, 1851
- Governor: John Young; Hamilton Fish; Washington Hunt
- Preceded by: Nathaniel S. Benton
- Succeeded by: Henry S. Randall

Mayor of Auburn, New York
- In office 1860–1861
- Preceded by: Lansing Briggs
- Succeeded by: George Humphreys

Personal details
- Born: June 4, 1808 Aurora, New York
- Died: April 3, 1877 (aged 68) Auburn, New York
- Resting place: Fort Hill Cemetery, Auburn, New York
- Party: Whig (before 1855); Republican (from 1855)
- Spouse: Mary Elizabeth Pitney (m. 1832-1877, his death)
- Relations: Edwin Barber Morgan (brother); Noyes Barber (uncle)
- Children: 4
- Education: Yale College
- Profession: Attorney

Christopher Morgan (June 4, 1808 – April 3, 1877) was an American attorney and politician from Auburn, New York. He was most notable for his service as a member of the United States House of Representatives from 1839 to 1843.

== Early life ==
Morgan was born in Aurora, New York on June 4, 1808, a son of Christopher Morgan (1777–1834) and Nancy (Barber) Morgan. He was educated in Cayuga County and attended Yale College, from which he graduated in 1830.

He began to study law with an attorney in Aurora, and completed his studies with Elijah Miller and William H. Seward in Auburn. Morgan was then admitted to the bar and commenced practice in Aurora.

== Career ==
Morgan was elected as a Whig to represent the 24th District in the Twenty-sixth and Twenty-seventh Congresses (March 4, 1839 – March 3, 1843). After redistricting following the 1840 U.S. Census, Morgan ran for reelection to the Twenty-eighth Congress in the 25th District in 1842, and was defeated by George O. Rathbun. In the 24th District, Morgan was succeeded by Horace Wheaton.

He moved to Auburn in 1843 and practiced law with Seward and Samuel Blatchford as Morgan, Blatchford & Seward from 1844 to 1847. He was Secretary of State of New York from 1847 to 1851, which included the additional duty of Superintendent of the New York public schools. After leaving office he resumed the practice of law in Auburn.

He became a Republican at the party's organization in the mid-1850s. He served as mayor of Auburn from 1860 to 1861, and was a Trustee of the State lunatic asylum in Utica, New York.

== Death and burial ==
Morgan died in Auburn on April 3, 1877. He was buried at Fort Hill Cemetery in Auburn.

== Family ==
In 1832, Morgan married Mary Elizabeth Pitney (1813–1893) of Auburn. They were the parents of a son who did not live to adulthood and three daughters: Cornelia Louise (b. 1834), the wife of C. Eugene Barber; Mary Elizabeth (b. 1835), the wife of William C. Barber; Joseph Pitney (1839–1841); and Frances Adelaide Morgan (b. 1841), the wife of William Beasley Benson.

Morgan was the brother of Edwin Barber Morgan and nephew of Noyes Barber.

== See also ==
- List of mayors of Auburn, New York

U.S. House of Representatives
Preceded by William H. Noble	Member of the U.S. House of Representatives from New York's 24th congressional district 1839–1843	Succeeded by Horace Wheaton
Political offices
Preceded by Nathaniel S. Benton	New York Secretary of State; 1848–1851	Succeeded by Henry S. Randall
