= Hiram Barney =

German-American politician and diplomat

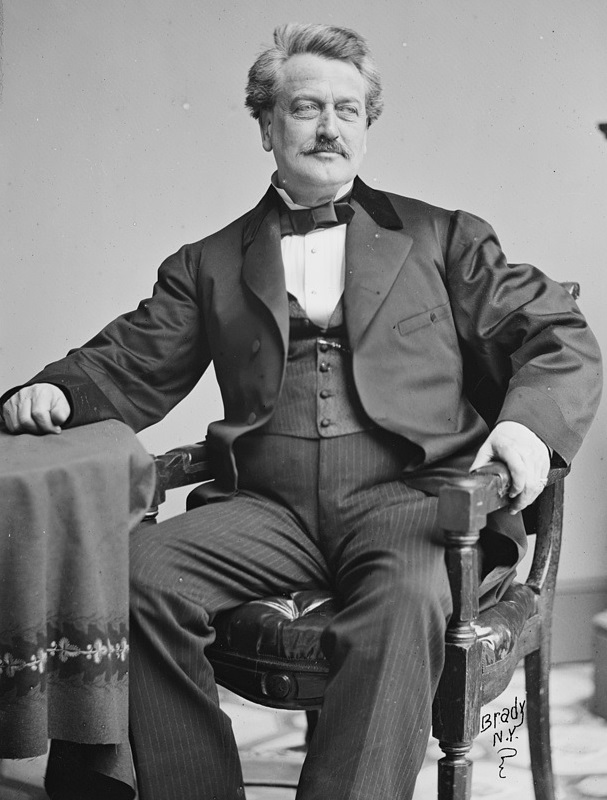

15th Collector of the Port of New York
- In office 1861–1864
- Appointed by: Abraham Lincoln
- Preceded by: Augustus Schell
- Succeeded by: Simeon Draper

Personal details
- Born: May 30, 1811 Henderson, New York
- Died: May 18, 1895 (aged 83) Spuyten Duyvil, New York
- Party: Free Soil; Republican
- Children: Lewis Tappan Barney
- Profession: Lawyer, politician

Hiram Barney (May 30, 1811 – May 18, 1895) was an American lawyer, abolitionist, and politician who served as Collector of the Port of New York from 1861 until his resignation in 1864 during the presidency of Abraham Lincoln. A trusted advisor to Lincoln, the President summoned Barney for his opinion on the Emancipation Proclamation whilst it was being drafted in 1862.

== Early life ==
Barney was born in Henderson, Jefferson County, New York and graduated from Union College in Schenectady, New York, in 1834.

== Career ==
In 1830, he served as chairman of the executive committee of the Young Men's Anti-Slavery Society in New York City. He was associated with John Jay, A.C. Coxe, Theodore Weld, and Henry Stanton. In 1836 Barney was taken into the law office of William C. Mulligan, the son of Hercules Mulligan, and began to practice as Mulligan's partner after his admission to the bar. In 1840, he formed a law partnership with William Mitchell in New York City. The firm was later continued under the name of Barney, Humphrey, and Butler and operates today as Kelley Drye & Warren LLP. Mitchell died suddenly, and in March 1849 Barney became associated with Benjamin Franklin Butler and his son William Allen Butler.

=== Political career ===
In 1840, he was nominated for the United States Congress by the Anti-Slavery Party. He was a presidential elector when the Free Soil Party was formed in 1848. Barney was a delegate to the Republican National Convention of 1856, which nominated John C. Fremont. He voted for Charles Sumner rather than Fremont while he was there. He attended the Republican National Convention in Chicago, Illinois in 1860. Barney met with Lincoln at Springfield, Illinois shortly after the convention ended. Barney raised $35,000 in New York, which he sent to the Illinois State Committee.

Lincoln called upon Barney at a hotel in Springfield when he was sent by Republicans of New York to consult with Lincoln regarding his Cabinet. Lincoln requested that Barney write out a list in pencil of his choices for Cabinet posts. He chose Caleb Smith as Secretary of the Interior and Simon Cameron as Secretary of War, rather than men Barney had recommended.

Barney was Collector during the first three years of the administration of Abraham Lincoln. He resigned, under a cloud of corruption, and refused an appointment to a foreign mission.

== Personal life ==
His first wife, Susannah Tappan, was the daughter of the abolitionist Lewis Tappan. They had six children. One of their sons, Lewis Tappan Barney, became a highly decorated officer during the American Civil War. Barney married his second wife, Harriet E. Kilburne, in 1880.

Barney died at Spuyten Duyvil in 1895, after a long illness. He was 83.

Government offices
Preceded by Augustus Schell	Collector of the Port of New York; 1861–1864	Succeeded by Simeon Draper
