= Henry Storms =

American politician (c. 1795–1874)

Henry Storms (c. 1795 – 1874 in Tarrytown, Westchester County, New York) was an American merchant and politician from New York.

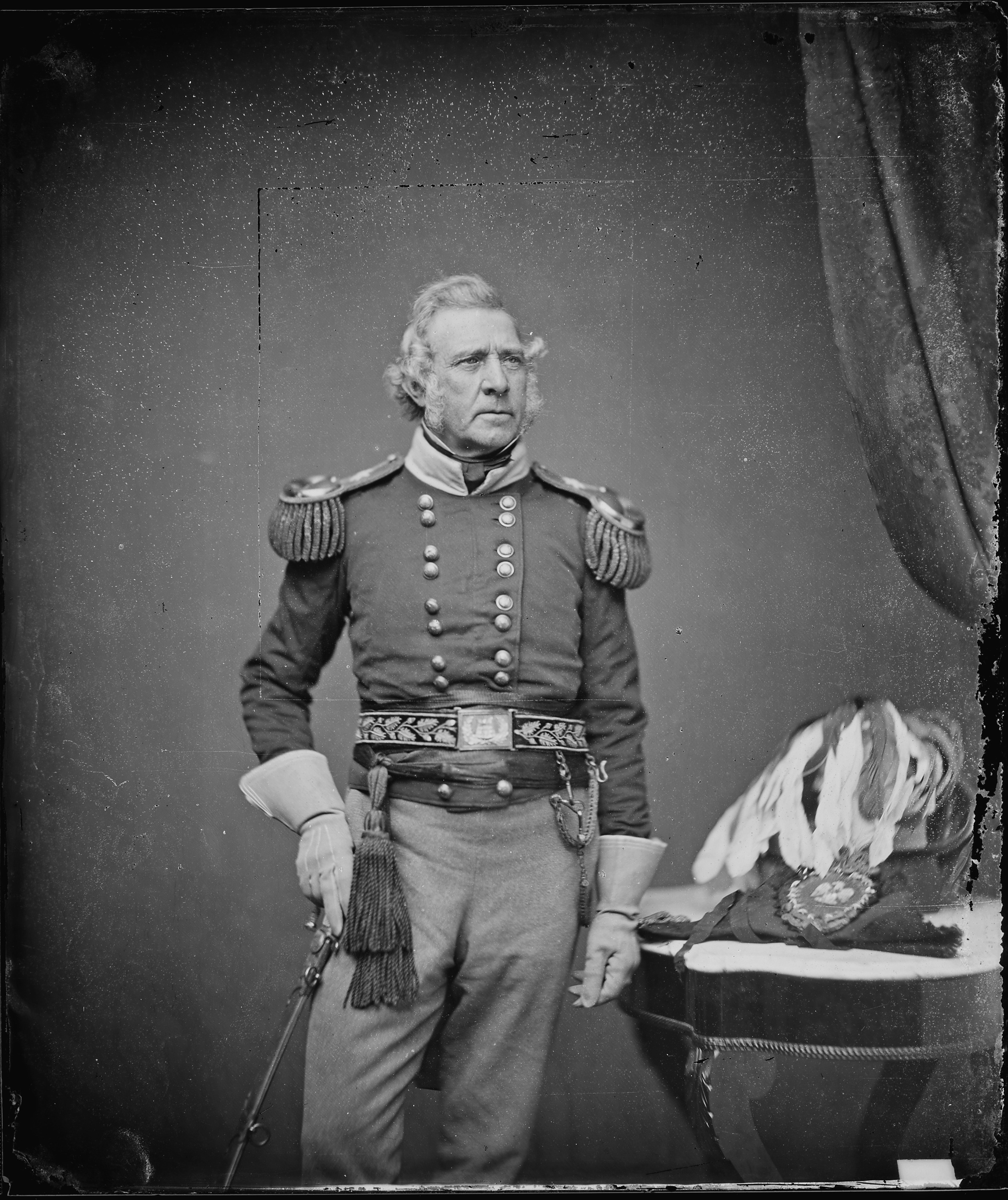
Henry Storms, photograph by Mathew Brady

== Life ==
He was an Assistant Alderman from the Twelfth Ward in 1826 and 1827.

He was Commissary General of the New York State Militia from 1842 to 1847. In 1847, he was the President of the Monument Association which was to build a George Washington Monument in New York City. The cornerstone of the monument was laid with a great celebration on October 19, 1847, and then abandoned. On December 15, 1847, an Act was passed by the State Legislature "to pay Henry Storms a compensation for extra services rendered to the State". The Act was repealed on April 11, 1848, by the next State Legislature.

From 1852 to 1854, he was an Inspector of State Prisons, elected in 1851 on the Democratic ticket. His corrupt administration at Sing Sing was denounced in a report published in 1855.

== Sources ==
- The New York Civil List compiled by Franklin Benjamin Hough (page 45; Weed, Parsons and Co., 1858)
- The New York Civil List compiled by Franklin Benjamin Hough, Stephen C. Hutchins and Edgar Albert Werner (1867; pages 244 and 411)
- The Journal of Prison Discipline and Philanthropy (Pennsylvania Prison Society, 1855; pages 225ff)
- Manual of the Corporation of the City of New York (page 493)
- Laws of the State of New York (1848; page 336)
- TOWERING MONUMENT TO WASHINGTON THAT NEW YORK BEGAN AND THEN FORGOT in NYT on February 18, 1912
- Brigadier General Henry Storms in "Mexican War Uniforms" at Aztec Club
