= James M. Cook =

American politician

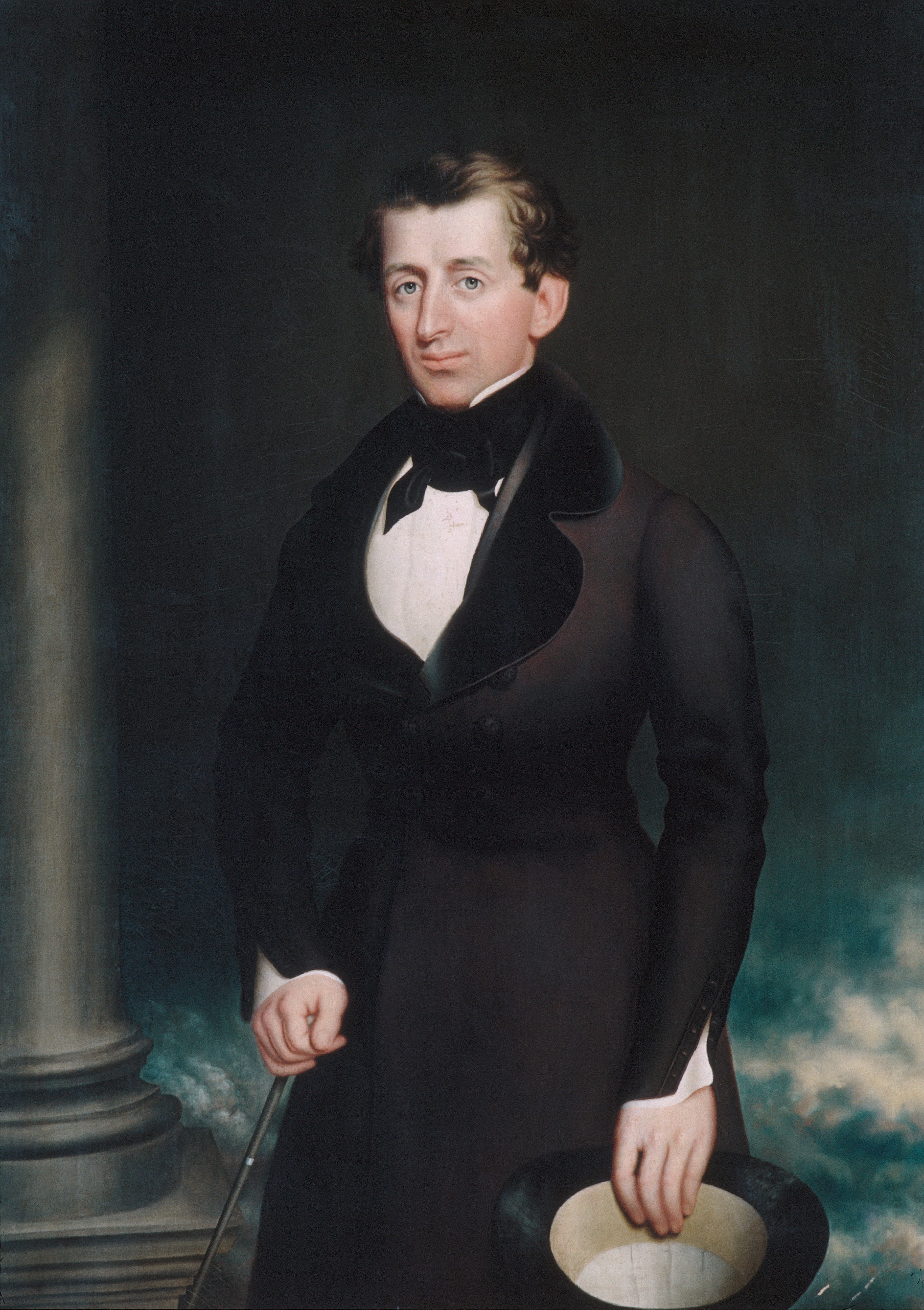
- portrait by Nelson Cook

New York State Treasurer
- In office 1852
- Governor: Washington Hunt
- Preceded by: Alvah Hunt
- Succeeded by: Benjamin Welch

New York State Comptroller
- In office 1854–1855
- Governor: Horatio Seymour; Myron H. Clark
- Preceded by: John C. Wright
- Succeeded by: Lorenzo Burrows

Member of the New York State Senate from the 15th district
- In office 1864–1865
- Preceded by: William Clark
- Succeeded by: Adam W. Kline

Member of the New York State Senate from the 13th district
- In office 1848–1851
- Preceded by: New district
- Succeeded by: Dan S. Wright

President of the Village of Ballston Spa, New York
- In office 1842–1843, 1845

Personal details
- Born: James Merrill Cook; November 19, 1807 Ballston, Saratoga County, New York
- Died: April 12, 1868 (aged 60) Saratoga, New York
- Spouse: Anna Cady

James Merrill Cook (November 19, 1807 – April 12, 1868) was an American businessman, banker and politician.

== Career ==
From 1838 to 1856, he was the first President of the Ballston Spa Bank (later Ballston Spa National Bank) and also was the owner of cotton mills at Ballston Spa.

In 1842, 1843 and 1845, he was President of the Village of Ballston Spa. He was a delegate to the New York State Constitutional Convention of 1846.

He was a member of the New York State Senate (13th district) from 1848 to 1851, sitting in the 71st, 72nd, 73rd, 74th New York State Legislatures.

At the state election in November 1851, he was elected New York State Treasurer on the Whig ticket by a margin of only 228 votes (200,693 for Cook; 200,465 for Welch), and took office on January 1, 1852. His Democratic opponent Benjamin Welch contested the election successfully, and on November 20, 1852, Welch succeeded to the office for the remainder of the term.

He was New York State Comptroller from 1854 to 1855, defeated for re-election in 1855 by the American Party candidate Lorenzo Burrows.

From 1856 to 1861, he was Superintendent of the New York State Banking Department. He was again a member of the State Senate (15th district) in 1864 and 1865.

== Personal life ==
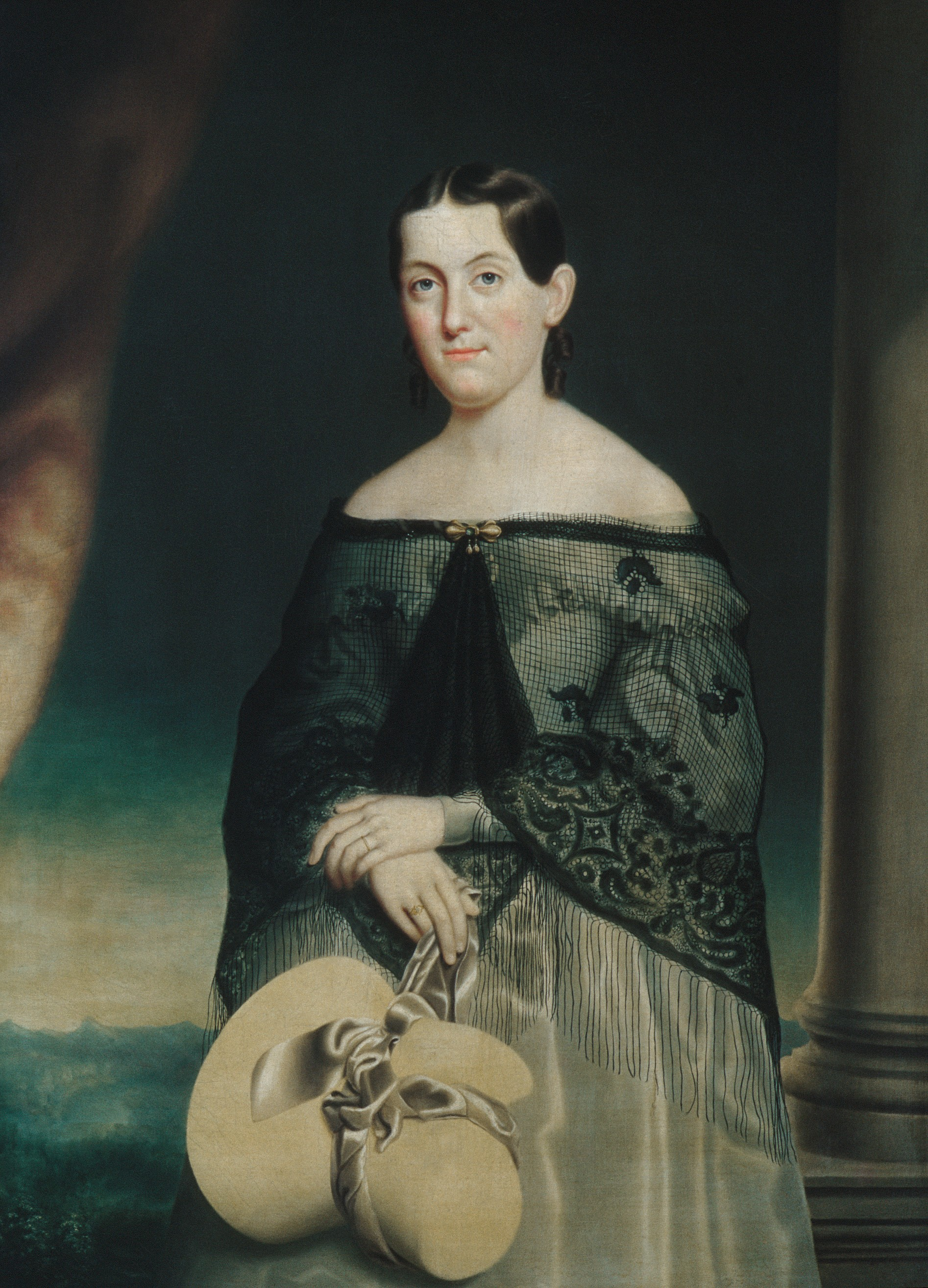
Portrait of his wife, Anna Cady by Nelson Cook, 1840, at The Metropolitan Museum of Art

Cook was married to Anna Cady. Their daughter, Catherine Phillips Cook, married George Sherman Batcheller.

Cook is buried in the Ballston Spa Village Cemetery.

== Sources ==
- Official state canvass, in NYT on January 1, 1852
- Political Graveyard
- History of Saratoga County, New York by Nathaniel Bartlett Sylvester (1878)
- Google Books The New York Civil List compiled by Franklin Benjamin Hough (pages 34, 36, 39 and 139; Weed, Parsons and Co., 1858)
- The Whig ticket in 1855, in NYT on September 29, 1855
- Re-appointed Bank Superintendent, in NYT on January 13, 1859

New York State Senate
New district	Member of the New York State Senate from the 13th district 1848–1851	Succeeded by Dan S. Wright
Political offices
Preceded by Alvah Hunt	New York State Treasurer; 1852	Succeeded by Benjamin Welch
Preceded by John C. Wright	New York State Comptroller; 1854–1855	Succeeded by Lorenzo Burrows
New York State Senate
Preceded by William Clark	Member of the New York State Senate from the 15th district 1864–1865	Succeeded by Adam W. Kline
