= Horace Wheaton =

American politician

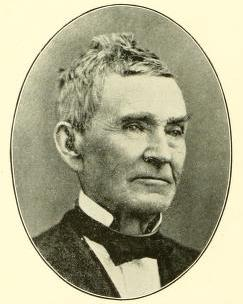

4th Mayor of Syracuse
- In office 1851–1853
- Preceded by: Alfred H. Hovey
- Succeeded by: Jason Cooper Woodruff

Member of the U.S. House of Representatives from New York's 24th district
- In office March 4, 1843 – March 3, 1847
- Preceded by: Christopher Morgan
- Succeeded by: Daniel Gott

Member of the New York State Assembly
- In office 1834

Personal details
- Born: February 24, 1803 New Milford, Connecticut, U.S.
- Died: June 23, 1882 (aged 79) Syracuse, New York, U.S.
- Party: Democratic

Horace Wheaton (February 24, 1803 – June 23, 1882) was an American businessman and politician who served as a United States representative for New York's 24th congressional district from 1843 to 1847.

== Early life and education ==
Born in New Milford, Connecticut, he moved with his parents to Pompey, New York in 1810. He received limited schooling and graduated from Pompey Academy.

== Career ==
Wheaton engaged in mercantile pursuits and was a member of the New York State Assembly in 1834. He was one of the commissioners to build a railroad between Syracuse and Utica, and was postmaster of Pompey from 1840 to 1842. He was supervisor and city treasurer of Pompey and was elected as a Democrat to the Twenty-eighth and Twenty-ninth Congresses, representing New York's 24th congressional district, holding office from March 4, 1843, to March 3, 1847. He was not a candidate for renomination in 1846 and that year moved to Syracuse. He was mayor of Syracuse from 1851 to 1853 and city treasurer in 1857 and 1858. He also engaged in hardware, saddlery, and mercantile pursuits.

== Personal life ==
Wheaton died in Syracuse in 1882. He was interred at the Oakwood Cemetery.
