= 1863 New York state election =

- November 3, 1863

The 1863 New York state election was held on November 3, 1863, to elect the Secretary of State, the State Comptroller, the Attorney General, the State Treasurer, the State Engineer, a Judge of the New York Court of Appeals, a Canal Commissioner and an Inspector of State Prisons, as well as all members of the New York State Assembly and the New York State Senate.

== History ==
The Union state convention - Republicans and War Democrats which supported the Union and Abraham Lincoln's policy during the American Civil War - met on September 2 at Syracuse, New York. Ward Hunt was Temporary Chairman until the choice of Abraham Wakeman as president. Peter A. Porter was nominated for Secretary of State on the first ballot (vote: Porter 213, Chauncey Depew 140, Theophilus C. Callicot 15). Thomas W. Olcott for Comptroller, John Cochrane for Attorney General, George W. Schuyler for Treasurer, and Henry R. Selden [incumbent] for Judge of the Court of Appeals, were nominated by acclamation. Benjamin F. Bruce was nominated for Canal Commissioner on the first ballot (vote: Bruce 220, Stephen T. Hayt 131). The incumbent William B. Taylor was re-nominated for State Engineer on the first ballot (vote: Taylor 234, J. Platt Goodsell 67, F. A. Utter 26, Charles W. Wentz 10). The incumbent James K. Bates was re-nominated for Prison Inspector by acclamation. When informed of his nomination, Colonel Porter, who was commanding his troops at Baltimore, declined to run because he "wanted to serve his country in the field." Olcott also declined to run, and the State Committee substituted Depew and the incumbent Lucius Robinson on the Union ticket.

The Constitutional Union state convention met on September 9 but did not nominate a ticket.

The Democratic state convention met on September 10 at Albany, New York.

== Results ==
The whole Union ticket was elected.

The incumbents Robinson, Taylor, Selden and Bates were re-elected. The incumbents Lewis and Wright were defeated.

21 Unionists and 11 Democrats were elected to a two-year term (1864–65) in the New York State Senate.

82 Unionists and 46 Democrats were elected for the session of 1864 to the New York State Assembly.

1863 state election results
Office	Union ticket		Democratic ticket	
Secretary of State	Chauncey Depew	314,347	Daniel B. St. John	284,942
Comptroller	Lucius Robinson	314,236	Sanford E. Church	284,849
Attorney General	John Cochrane	313,865	Marshall B. Champlain	284,762
Treasurer	George W. Schuyler	314,303	William B. Lewis	284,618
State Engineer	William B. Taylor	314,362	Van Rensselaer Richmond	284,738
Judge of the Court of Appeals	Henry R. Selden	313,327	William F. Allen	283,532
Canal Commissioner	Benjamin F. Bruce	313,840	William W. Wright	284,984
Inspector of State Prisons	James K. Bates	314,093	David B. McNeil	284,980

== See also ==
- New York state elections

== Sources ==
- Result in The Tribune Almanac compiled by Horace Greeley of the New York Tribune
- Result The State Election in NYT on December 5, 1863
