= 1870 New York special judicial election =

A special judicial election was held on May 17, 1870, to fill the seats on the re-organized New York Court of Appeals.

== Background ==
An Amendment to the New York Constitution, adopted in November 1869, re-organized the Court of Appeals. The first judges were to be elected at a special statewide election to take office on July 4, 1870. The new Court had a Chief Judge, elected as such, and six associate judges. Each ticket could have only four candidates for associate judge so that at least two judges were elected by the minority party.

In April 1870, a new city charter for New York City was enacted by the New York State Legislature under instructions from William M. Tweed. The first municipal election under the new charter was scheduled for the same day, with the intention to swamp the strong upstate Republican vote with a heavy Democratic/Tammany vote in New York City.

== Results ==
Boss Tweed's plan worked, and all five Democratic candidates were elected, leaving only two judgeships to the Republican minority.

1870 judicial election results
| Office | Democratic ticket | | Republican ticket | |
|---|---|---|---|---|
| Chief Judge of the Court of Appeals | Sanford E. Church | 239,890 | Henry R. Selden | 151,978 |
| Associate Judges of the Court of Appeals | William F. Allen | 239,173 | Charles J. Folger | 154,930 |
| | Martin Grover | 238,516 | Charles Andrews | 154,094 |
| | Rufus W. Peckham Sr. | 236,685 | Charles Mason | 152,306 |
| | Charles A. Rapallo | 235,994 | Robert S. Hale | 150,862 |

Of the seven original judges elected in 1870, only two completed the 14-year term. Four died (Peckham in 1873, Grover in 1875, Allen in 1878, and Church in 1880) and Folger was first appointed, and then elected, Chief Judge, but resigned in 1881. Andrews was then appointed Chief Judge, but lost the election in 1882, and continued on the bench as an associate judge. Rapallo and Andrews were re-elected in 1884. Rapallo died during his second term in 1887. Andrews was elected Chief Judge in 1892, and retired at the end of 1897 after almost 28 years, the longest tenure of any judge on the New York Court of Appeals.

== Sources ==
- THE ELECTION TODAY in NYT on May 17, 1870
- Result in NYT on June 17, 1870
- Judges of the Court of Appeals at Court History New York
- Results: The Tribune Almanac 1871
