= 1861 New York state election =

- November 5, 1861

The 1861 New York state election was held on November 5, 1861, to elect the Secretary of State, the State Comptroller, the New York State Attorney General, the State Treasurer, the State Engineer, a Judge of the New York Court of Appeals, two Canal Commissioners and an Inspector of State Prisons, as well as all members of the New York State Assembly and the New York State Senate.

== History ==
The "Independent People's" state convention met on September 10 at Syracuse, New York with the intention to nominate a ticket which would be endorsed by the Republican state convention which was due to meet at the same city on the following day. The convention was dominated by the old Hunkers/Hard faction of the Democratic Party (which had supported John C. Breckinridge for the Presidency the year before, and had been reduced to a small minority at the 1860 New York state election) and the Greeley Republicans.

The Republican state convention met on September 11 at Syracuse, New York and endorsed the Independent People's ticket with the exception of Frederick A. Tallmadge. The Republicans preferred the incumbent Canal Commissioner Benjamin F. Bruce to be re-nominated.

== Results ==
The whole jointly nominated part of the "Union" ticket was elected, only the Democratic candidate for short-term Canal Commissioner William W. Wright was elected due to the split of the "Union" ticket.

The incumbents Floyd-Jones, Richmond, Comstock and Bruce were defeated.

22 Republicans and 10 Democrats were elected to a two-year term (1862–63) in the New York State Senate.

The New York State Assembly of 1862 was almost evenly divided between Republicans and Democrats, most of whom had been elected on the "Union" ticket. There was a small majority of Republicans.

1861 state election results
Office	Independent People's ticket		Republican ticket		Democratic ticket	
Secretary of State	Horatio Ballard	297,428	Horatio Ballard		David R. Floyd-Jones	189,716
Comptroller	Lucius Robinson	296,855	Lucius Robinson		George G. Scott	188,654
Attorney General	Daniel S. Dickinson	295,609	Daniel S. Dickinson		Marshall B. Champlain	188,361
Treasurer	William B. Lewis	296,709	William B. Lewis		William Williams	188,774
State Engineer	William B. Taylor	294,422	William B. Taylor		Van Rensselaer Richmond	188,507
Judge of the Court of Appeals	William B. Wright	276,901	William B. Wright		George F. Comstock	198,746
Canal Commissioner (full term)	Franklin A. Alberger	295,960	Franklin A. Alberger		Jarvis Lord	181,283
Canal Commissioner (short term)	Frederick A. Tallmadge	106,721	Benjamin F. Bruce	179,691	William W. Wright	198,385
Inspector of State Prisons	Abraham B. Tappen	297,126	Abraham B. Tappen		William C. Rhodes	189,260

== See also ==
- New York state elections

== Sources ==
- Result in The Tribune Almanac 1862
- The Union ticket: in Harper's Weekly, September 28, 1861, pg. 611
- The tickets: in NYT on November 5, 1861 (giving "Low" instead of Lord)
