= New York Court for the Trial of Impeachments =

New York court

The Court for the Trial of Impeachments, and the Correction of Errors was established by the New York State Constitution of 1777. It consisted then of the Lieutenant Governor of New York (who is ex officio President of the State Senate), the Chancellor, the justices of the New York Supreme Court and the members of the New York State Senate. It had two distinct jurisdictions: the trial of State officers who had been impeached by the New York State Assembly, and it served as a court of last resort in which decisions of either the New York Supreme Court or the Chancellor could be reversed.

The Court for the Correction of Errors was abolished by the State Constitution of 1846, and its jurisdiction on appeals transferred to the succeeding New York Court of Appeals. Hiram Denio published the records of the cases which were tried in the Court for the Correction of Errors from 1830 to 1847.

The Court for the Trial of Impeachments, in the newspapers often referred to as the Impeachment Court or sometimes as the High Court of Impeachment, still exists. Since 1847, it consists of the Lieutenant Governor, the Chief Judge of the New York Court of Appeals, the associate judges of the Court of Appeals, and the members of the State Senate.

Any member of this court who has been impeached and is on trial himself, is temporarily excluded from it. Likewise, if the Governor of New York or the Lieutenant Governor are tried, the Lieutenant Governor and the Temporary President of the State Senate are excluded. The impeachment now requires a majority vote of the total of members of Assembly, and a conviction requires a two-thirds majority of the Impeachment Court.

The most famous impeachment trial held by this court was the impeachment of Governor William Sulzer in 1913.

== List of impeachment trials ==
=== 1853 ===
Canal Commissioner John C. Mather (Dem.), acquitted – Lt. Gov. Sanford E. Church presided.

=== 1868 ===
- Canal Commissioner Robert C. Dorn (Rep.), acquitted – Chief Judge Ward Hunt presided and voted against conviction.
  - Votes for conviction: Judges Martin Grover (Dem.) and Theodore Miller (Dem.); State Senators Beach, Cauldwell, Crowley, Hall, Morris and Nichols – 8
  - Votes against conviction: Judges Ward Hunt (Rep.), Lewis B. Woodruff (Rep.), Charles Mason (Rep.), William J. Bacon (Rep.), Thomas W. Clerke and Charles C. Dwight; State Senators Chapman, Banks, Campbell, Hubbard, Humphrey, Kennedy, Mattoon, Morgan, Wicks, Palmer, Parker, Thayer, Van Patten – 19

=== 1872 ===
Supreme Court justice George G. Barnard (Dem.), convicted unanimously – Lt. Gov. Allen C. Beach (Dem.) presided

=== 1913 ===
Governor William Sulzer (Dem.), convicted &ndash by a 43-12 vote; Chief Judge Edgar M. Cullen (Dem.) presided and voted against conviction.
