= 1846 New York state election =

1846 New York state elections
- November 3, 1846

The 1846 New York state election was held on November 3, 1846, to elect the governor, the lieutenant governor and two Canal Commissioners, as well as all members of the New York State Assembly and eight members of the New York State Senate.

== History ==
At the Whig state convention, Young was nominated for governor on the third ballot with 76 votes against 45 for Millard Fillmore who had been the unsuccessful Whig candidate at the previous gubernatorial election in 1844.

== Results ==
The Democratic and the Whig parties being of almost equal strength at the time, the cross-endorsed Anti-Rent ticket was elected. The incumbent governor Wright was defeated. The incumbent lieutenant governor Gardiner was re-elected.

At the same time, the voters adopted the New York State Constitution of 1846, so that the elected Canal Commissioners could not take office for their elected term. Both Hudson and Clowes eventually took office by appointment to fill vacancies.

Five Whigs and three Democrats were elected for the session of 1847 to the New York State Senate. Under the Constitution of 1821, every year 8 of the 32 senators were elected to a four-year term. These 8 now elected, and the 24 remaining state senators, were legislated out of office by the Constitution of 1846, their term ending on December 31, 1847.

72 Whigs and 56 Democrats were elected to the New York State Assembly of the 70th New York State Legislature, of whom 6 Whigs and 4 Democrats were elected with Anti-Rent endorsement.

1846 state election results
Office	Whig ticket		Democratic ticket		Anti-Rent ticket	Liberty ticket		National Reform ticket	Native American ticket	
Governor	John Young	198,878	Silas Wright	187,306	John Young	Henry Bradley	12,844	Henry Bradley	Ogden Edwards	6,305
Lieutenant Governor	Hamilton Fish	187,613	Addison Gardiner	200,970	Addison Gardiner	William L. Chaplin	13,901	William L. Chaplin	George Folsom	6,133
Canal Commissioners	Charles Cook		John T. Hudson		John T. Hudson	James Sperry			Robert C. Russell	
	Thomas Clowes	197,851	Cornelius L. Allen	190,596	Thomas Clowes	John Thomas			James Silsbee	

Obs.: The number of votes is the total of Whig and Anti-Rent votes for Young and Clowes, the total of Democratic and Anti-Rent votes for Gardiner and Hudson, and the total of Liberty and National Reform votes for Bradley and Chaplin.

== See also ==
- New York gubernatorial elections
- New York state elections

== Sources ==
- Result in Manual of the Corporation of the City of New York (1852; page 367)
- The election in 1846, in Political History of the State of New York from January 1, 1841, to January 1, 1847, Vol III, including The Life of Silas Wright by Jabez Delano Hammond (L. W. Hall, Syracuse NY, 1849; page 689)
- The Result of N.Y. State Election: Its Causes and Consequences (extra edition of the Albany Atlas, December 1846, 22 pages)
- Tickets in Miscellaneous Documents printed by order of the House of Representatives (pg. 43ff)
