= Franklin A. Alberger =

American businessman and politician

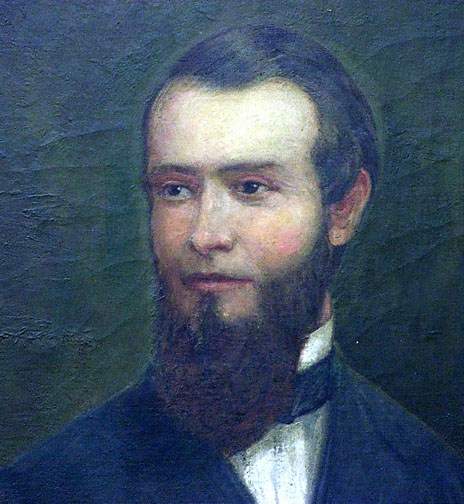
- Portrait of Franklin A. Alberger

Member of the New York State Assembly from Erie County's 3rd district
- In office January 1, 1871 – December 31, 1874
- Preceded by: Albert H. Blossom
- Succeeded by: Edward Gallagher

Erie Canal Commissioner
- In office January 6, 1862 – December 31, 1867
- Preceded by: William W. Wright
- Succeeded by: Benjamin F. Bruce

26th Mayor of Buffalo
- In office January 2, 1860 – January 6, 1862
- Preceded by: Timothy T. Lockwood
- Succeeded by: William G. Fargo

Personal details
- Born: January 14, 1825 Baltimore, Maryland, United States
- Died: August 24, 1877 (aged 52) Buffalo, New York, United States
- Party: Republican
- Spouse: Katherine Rice
- Children: four children
- "Franklin A. Alberger". Through The Mayor's Eyes, The Only Complete History of the Mayor's of Buffalo, New York, Compiled by Michael Rizzo. The Buffalonian is produced by The Peoples History Union. 2009-05-27.

Franklin Augustus Alberger (January 14, 1825 – August 24, 1877) was an American businessman and politician from New York.

== Life ==
He was the son of Job Alberger, a butcher who owned a shop and slaughterhouses. In 1837, the family removed to Buffalo. Franklin learned the butcher's trade from his father, and opened a pork packing business with his brothers. He married Katharine Rice, and they had four children.

He entered politics as a Whig and joined the Republican Party on its foundation. In 1854, he was elected alderman from the Eleventh Ward, and in 1859 from the Ninth Ward. The Union city convention was held on October 22, 1859, and after many ballots Alberger was nominated for Mayor. He was Mayor of Buffalo, New York from January 2, 1860, to January 6, 1862.

He was a Canal Commissioner from 1862 to 1867, elected in 1861 and 1864 on the Union ticket.

He was a Republican member of the New York State Assembly (Erie Co., 3rd D.) in 1871, 1872, 1873 and 1874.

He died suddenly, apparently of cholera, and was buried at the Forest Lawn Cemetery, Buffalo.

== Sources ==
- The New York Civil List compiled by Franklin Benjamin Hough, Stephen C. Hutchins and Edgar Albert Werner (1867; pages 400, 406 and 505)
- Political Graveyard [without middle initial]
- The Mayors of Buffalo, at The Buffalonian

New York State Assembly
Preceded by Albert H. Blossom	New York State Assembly; Erie County, 3rd District; 1871–1874	Succeeded by Edward Gallagher (politician)
Political offices
Preceded by Timothy T. Lockwood	Mayor of Buffalo, NY; 1860–1862	Succeeded by William G. Fargo
