= Charles Mason (New York judge) =

American judge

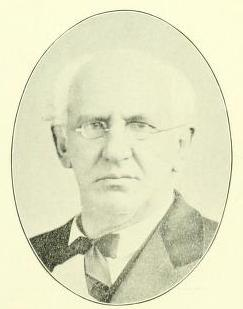
Charles Mason

Charles Mason (July 18, 1810, in Plattsburgh, Clinton County, New York – May 31, 1879, in Utica, Oneida County, New York) was an American lawyer and politician from New York.

== Life ==
He studied law with William Ruger in Watertown, was admitted to the bar, and practiced in partnership with Ruger until 1838 when he removed to Hamilton.

He was District Attorney of Madison County, New York from 1845 to 1847. He was a justice of the New York Supreme Court (6th D.) from 1847 to 1868, and ex officio a judge of the New York Court of Appeals in 1853 and 1861.

At the New York state election, 1867, he ran on the Republican ticket for the Court of Appeals, but was defeated by Democrat Martin Grover. In January 1868, he was appointed by Governor Reuben E. Fenton to the Court of Appeals to fill the vacancy caused by the death of William B. Wright. At the New York state election, 1869, he ran again for the Court of Appeals, but was defeated again, this time by Democrat John A. Lott. When the Court of Appeals was re-organized in 1870, he ran again at the New York special judicial election, 1870, but was defeated again. Two judges were to be elected from the minority ticket, but Charles J. Folger and Charles Andrews received more votes than Mason.

Congressman and Judge Joseph Mason was his brother.

== Sources ==
- The New York Civil List compiled by Franklin Benjamin Hough (pages 351 and 376; Weed, Parsons and Co., 1858)
- Court of Appeals judges at New York Court History
