= Adin Thayer =

American politician

Adin Thayer (September 24, 1816 – December 8, 1890 in Akron, Summit County, Ohio) was an American politician from New York.

== Life ==
He was the son of Adin Thayer (1785–1858) and Mary (Ball) Thayer. He married first Eliza D. (1821–1843). He married second Fanny A. Crawford (1820–1875).

He lived at Hoosick Falls, New York.

In 1874, he was elected a Canal Commissioner on the Democratic ticket, and was in office from 1875 to 1877. The office of Canal Commissioner had been abolished by an amendment to the New York State Constitution in 1876, pending the appointment of a Superintendent of Public Works. The Canal Commissioners remained in office in 1877. Due to the erroneous belief that, with the office having been abolished, no provisions for the election of a successor existed, no successor was elected in November 1877, and Thayer tried to hold over in office until the eventual appointment of a Superintendent of Public Works. Attorney General Augustus Schoonmaker, Jr. explained that that was not correct. He held that, since the Canal Commissioners should discharge their duties as before until the appointment of a Superintendent of Public Works, and none had been appointed by November 1877, a successor should have been elected to take office on January 1, 1878, that Thayer's term had expired on December 31 and he could not hold over in office, and that in fact a vacancy existed that could be filled according to the State Constitution (in this case by the election of a Canal Commissioner by joint ballot of the State Legislature). Thayer contested Schoonmaker's decision, and threatened to go to court. David Dudley Field, as Thayer's attorney gave the opinion that if no successor has been elected, the incumbent should hold over. On the other side, Assemblyman Skinner offered a resolution to elect a successor by joint ballot of the State Legislature on January 17, 1878. The vacancy was not filled, and on February 8, 1878, the first Superintendent of Public Works, Benjamin S. W. Clark, qualified to take over the duties from the remaining two Canal Commissioners Christopher A. Walrath and Darius A. Ogden.

He was a delegate to the 1880 Democratic National Convention.

He died from "paralysis" while staying at the home of his son in Akron, Ohio, and was buried at the Old Maple Grove Cemetery in Hoosick, NY.

== Sources ==
- The Democratic state convention in NYT on September 17, 1874
- Schoonmaker's expertise in NYT on January 7, 1878
- THE CANAL COMMISSIONERSHIP in NYT on January 10, 1878
- Starting for Cincinnati in NYT on June 18, 1880
- Obit in NYT on December 9, 1890
- Burial records from Rensselaer County, at RootsWeb
