= Charles Cook (New York politician) =

American politician

Charles Cook (November 20, 1800 Springfield, Otsego County, New York - October 16, 1866 Auburn, Cayuga County, New York) was an American politician from New York.

== Life ==
His father was killed during the War of 1812, and a few years later he left home to find work. He became a clerk in a store in Herkimer, New York, then went to Utica, New York and learned how to build canals. From 1823 on, he took part in the construction of the Delaware and Hudson Canal. In 1829, in company with his brothers Hiram and Elbert, he engaged in the construction of the Chemung Canal, and settled at Havana, NY, which was incorporated as a village in 1836. Cook bought large tracts of land and invested in improvements.

In 1846, he ran on the Whig ticket for Canal Commissioner, but was defeated. In 1847, he was one of the first three Canal Commissioners elected under the New York State Constitution of 1846, and drew the one-year term. He was re-elected to a full three-year term in 1848, remaining in office from 1848 to 1851.

In 1854, he finally succeeded in his effort to create Schuyler County, New York with Havana, NY, as the county seat. After only seven years the county seat was moved to Watkins against Cook's fierce opposition.

He was a member of the New York State Senate (27th District) in 1862 and 1863.

He was one of the owners of the Blossburg Coal Company, in Blossburg, Pennsylvania. He took part in the construction of the Erie Railway from Binghamton, New York to Elmira, New York which was used for the shipping of the coal.

He founded Cook Academy at Havana, NY, a boarding high school which closed after World War II. The building houses now the New York Academy of Fire Sciences.

He never married. The estate was inherited by his brother Elbert.

== Sources ==
- The New York Civil List compiled by Franklin Benjamin Hough (page 42; Weed, Parsons and Co., 1858)
- The New-York Civil List compiled by Franklin Benjamin Hough, Stephen C. Hutchins & Edgar Albert Werner (pages 406 and 443; Weed, Parsons and Co., Albany NY, 1867)
- Bust unveiled, with bio, in NYT on November 21, 1886
- Charles Cook - The Father of Schuyler County by Barbara H. Bell in The Crooked Lake Review (April 1995)

New York State Senate
| Preceded by Samuel H. Hammond | New York State Senate; 27th District; 1862–1863 | Succeeded by Stephen T. Hayt |
