= Martin I. Townsend =

American politician

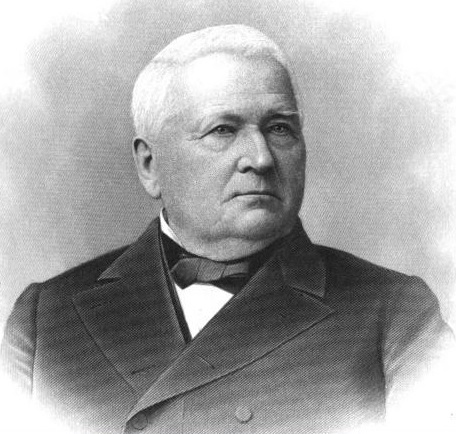

Member of the U.S. House of Representatives from New York's 17th district
- In office March 4, 1875 – March 3, 1879
- Preceded by: Robert S. Hale
- Succeeded by: Walter A. Wood

United States Attorney for the Northern District of New York
- In office 1879–1887
- Preceded by: Richard Crowley
- Succeeded by: Daniel N. Lockwood

Personal details
- Born: Martin Ingham Townsend; February 6, 1810 Hancock, Massachusetts, U.S.
- Died: March 8, 1903 (aged 93) Troy, New York, U.S.
- Party: Republican
- Spouse: Louisa B. Kellogg (m. 1836; died 1890)
- Relations: Henry Bradford Nason (son-in-law)
- Children: Frances Kellogg Townsend
- Education: Williams College
- Occupation: Lawyer, politician

Martin Ingham Townsend (February 6, 1810 – March 8, 1903) was an American lawyer and politician from New York.

== Early life ==
Townsend was born on February 6, 1810, in Hancock, Massachusetts. He was one of four children born to Nathaniel Townsend and Cynthia (née Marsh) Townsend.

He moved with his parents to Williamstown, Massachusetts, in 1816. He attended the common schools, and graduated from Williams College in 1833.

== Career ==
After his graduation from Williams, he studied law with David Dudley Field in Albany, and then moved to Troy to become a clerk in the law office his brother, Rufus M. Townsend. He was admitted to the bar the following year in 1836, and commenced practice as a partner with his brother, later known as the firms of Townsends & Browne, when Irving Browne joined, then Townsends & Roche when W.J. Roche joined, Townsend & Roche upon the retirement of his brother, and Townsend, Roche & Nason.

He was District Attorney of Rensselaer County from 1842 to 1845. He was a delegate to the New York State Constitutional Convention of 1867. In 1869, he ran on the Republican ticket for New York State Attorney General, but was defeated by the incumbent Democrat Marshall B. Champlain. He was a Regent of the University of the State of New York from 1873 to 1903.

Townsend was elected as a Republican to the 44th and 45th United States Congresses, and served from March 4, 1875, to March 3, 1879. He was United States Attorney for the Northern District of New York from 1879 to 1887. He retired from legal practice in 1901.

Townsend was affectionately called the "Gladstone of Troy" after William Ewart Gladstone, the British Prime Minister. He reportedly did not appreciate the nickname however due to Gladstone's support of the South during the U.S. Civil War.

== Personal life ==
In 1836, Townsend was married to Louisa Bacon Kellogg (1812–1890), a student at the Emma Willard School and the daughter of Oren Kellogg, Esq. Together, they were the parents of a daughter:

- Frances Kellogg Townsend (b. 1841), who married professor Henry Bradford Nason (1842–1895), on September 7, 1864.

Townsend became gravely ill in December 1891, but recovered and lived for 12 more years. He died at his home in Troy, New York, of bronchial pneumonia on March 8, 1903. He was buried at the Oakwood Cemetery in Troy.

U.S. House of Representatives
Preceded by Robert S. Hale	Member of the U.S. House of Representatives from New York's 17th congressional district 1875–1879	Succeeded by Walter A. Wood
