= 1867 New York state election =

- November 5, 1867

The 1867 New York state election was held on November 5, 1867, to elect the Secretary of State, the State Comptroller, the Attorney General, the State Treasurer, the State Engineer, a Judge of the New York Court of Appeals, a Canal Commissioners and an Inspector of State Prisons, as well as all members of the New York State Assembly and the New York State Senate.

== History ==
The Democratic state convention met on October 3 and 4 at Tweddle Hall in Albany, New York. Mayor of New York John T. Hoffman was Temporary Chairman until the choice of Ex-Governor Horatio Seymour as president.

The Republican state convention met on September 25 at Syracuse, New York. James Gibson was Temporary Chairman until the choice of Roscoe Conkling as Permanent Chairman. James B. McKean was nominated for Secretary of State on the first ballot (vote: McKean 270, Francis C. Barlow [incumbent] 101, Gen. Hudson Lawrence 6). Calvin T. Hulburd was nominated for Comptroller on the first ballot (vote: Hulburd 238, Thomas Hillhouse [incumbent] 136). Theodore B. Gates was nominated for State Treasurer on the first ballot (vote: Gates 207, Alonzo B. Cornell 133, Frederick Juliand 27, Erastus S. Prosser 2). Archibald C. Powell was nominated for State Engineer by acclamation. John M. Hammond was nominated for Canal Commissioner on the first ballot (vote: Hammond 195, Benjamin Carpenter 139, Claudius V. B. Baerst 25, D. B. Palmer 6). Gilbert De La Matyr was nominated for Prison Inspector on the first ballot (vote: De La Matyr 199, David P. Forrest [incumbent] 107, H. Chisler 43, Henry L. Robinson 15, Mortimer Wait 6). Charles Mason was nominated for Judge of the Court of Appeals on the first ballot (vote: Mason 209, Thomas A. Johnson 113). Hulburd declined to run, and Thomas Hillhouse was then substituted on the ticket by the State Committee.

== Results ==
The whole Democratic ticket was elected.

The incumbent Hillhouse was defeated.

17 Republicans and 15 Democrats were elected to a two-year term (1868–69) in the New York State Senate.

1867 state election results
Office	Democratic ticket		Republican ticket	
Secretary of State	Homer A. Nelson	373,029	James B. McKean	325,099
Comptroller	William F. Allen	372,517	Thomas Hillhouse	325,658
Attorney General	Marshall B. Champlain	372,648	Joshua M. Van Cott	325,328
Treasurer	Wheeler H. Bristol	372,769	Theodore B. Gates	325,201
State Engineer	Van Rensselaer Richmond	364,702	Archibald C. Powell	324,775
Judge of the Court of Appeals	Martin Grover	364,849	Charles Mason	324,477
Canal Commissioner	John D. Fay	372,786	John M. Hammond	322,509
Inspector of State Prisons	Solomon Scheu	372,828	Gilbert De La Matyr	325,018

== See also ==
- New York state elections

== Sources ==
- Result in The Tribune Almanac compiled by Horace Greeley of the New York Tribune
- Result: Official Canvass of the State Vote in NYT on December 4, 1867
