= 1866 New York state election =

- November 6, 1866

The 1866 New York state election was held on November 6, 1866, to elect the governor, the lieutenant governor, a Canal Commissioner and an Inspector of State Prisons, as well as all members of the New York State Assembly. Besides, the voters were asked if a Constitutional Convention should be held in 1867, which was answered in the affirmative with 352,854 votes for, and 256,364 against the convention.

== History ==
The delegates to the Conservative Union state convention arrived on September 10 at Albany, New York. This convention was the result of the still ongoing party re-alignment after the American Civil War. The convention was an attempt by allies of President Andrew Johnson to unite Conservative Republicans and Democrats in a new party. Thurlow Weed was a delegate. John Adams Dix was talked of to be nominated for governor. The convention met on September 11 and 12 at Tweddle Hall. Sanford E. Church was temporary chairman and president. Mayor of New York John T. Hoffman (a Democrat of Tammany Hall) was nominated for governor by acclamation. Robert H. Pruyn (a Republican) was nominated for lieutenant governor on the first ballot (vote: Pruyn 169, Harlow L. Comstock 85). William W. Wright (who had been Canal Commissioner from 1862 to 1863) for Canal Commissioner, and Francis B. Gallagher for prison inspector, were also nominated by acclamation.

== Result ==
The whole Republican ticket was elected in a tight race, with a majority of about 14,000 votes out of more than 700,000.

The incumbent Governor Fenton was re-elected.

82 Republicans and 46 Democrats were elected for the session of 1865 to the New York State Assembly.

1866 state election results
Office	Republican ticket		Conservative Union ticket	
Governor	Reuben E. Fenton	366,315	John T. Hoffman	352,526
Lieutenant Governor	Stewart L. Woodford	366,970	Robert H. Pruyn	351,947
Canal Commissioner	Stephen T. Hayt	367,194	William W. Wright	351,643
Inspector of State Prisons	John Hammond	367,345	Francis B. Gallagher	359,072

== See also ==
- New York gubernatorial elections

== Sources ==
- Result in The Tribune Almanac compiled by Horace Greeley of the New York Tribune
- Result in NEW-YORK.; Official Declaration of the Vote at the November Election in NYT on December 6, 1866
