= Hiram Gardner =

American judge, lawyer, and politician

Hiram Gardner (1800 Dutchess County, New York - March 13, 1874 Lockport, Niagara County, New York) was an American lawyer and politician from New York.

== Life ==
He was admitted to the bar and commenced practice in Lockport in 1822.

He was a member from Niagara County of the New York State Assembly and a presidential elector in 1836. He was the Secretary of the New York Electoral College, and cast his vote for Martin Van Buren like all the New York electors.

He was a delegate to the New York State Constitutional Convention of 1846.

He was First Judge and Surrogate of the Niagara County Court from July 1847 to December 1851.

He was a Canal Commissioner from 1859 to 1861, elected on the Republican ticket.

== Sources ==
- The New York Civil List compiled by Franklin Benjamin Hough, Stephen C. Hutchins and Edgar Albert Werner (1867; pages 389 and 406)
- The New York Civil List compiled by Franklin Benjamin Hough (pages 42, 59, 218, 275, 329 and 362; Weed, Parsons and Co., 1858)
