= Henry Hamilton (New York politician) =

American judge

Henry Hamilton (March 28, 1788 – June 1, 1846) was an American lawyer and politician from New York.

== Life ==
In 1806, he removed from Herkimer County, New York to Schoharie, New York, and taught school. He studied law, and was admitted to the bar. In 1816, he married Maria Lawyer (1800–1867).

He was District Attorney of Schoharie County from 1818 to 1821. He was Surrogate of Schoharie County from 1832 to 1840.

In 1840, he was elected by the New York State Legislature one of the canal commissioners, and remained in office until 1842 when the new Democratic majority removed the Whig commissioners.

He was buried at the Old Stone Fort Cemetery in Schoharie.

== Sources ==
- The New York Civil List compiled by Franklin Benjamin Hough (page 42, 381 and 418; Weed, Parsons and Co., 1858)
- Early settlers in Schoharie, at RootsWeb
- History of Schoharie County New York, 1713-1882 with Illustrations and Biographical Sketches of Some of Its Prominent Men and Pioneers by William E. Roscoe (Heritage Books, 2007, ISBN 0-7884-3737-2, ISBN 978-0-7884-3737-3 ; page 367) [giving erroneously tenure as Surrogate "two years", in fact it was two terms (four years each)]
- Tomb inscriptions at Stone Fort Cemetery, at RootsWeb (says for Hamilton: "June 1, 1846 aged 58 years 2 m. 8 days", which would place his birthday at March 24)
- The New York Annual Register (1840; page 394)
