= Reuben W. Stroud =

American civil engineer and politician

Reuben W. Stroud (1841 in Lenox, Madison County, New York – December 2, 1875 in Syracuse, Onondaga County, New York) was an American civil engineer and politician from New York.

== Life ==
He began his engineering career as assistant to John B. Jervis.

In 1870, he removed to Syracuse, NY, and was Chief Engineer on the construction of the Syracuse and Chenango Valley Railroad of which he became Superintendent after the construction was finished.

In 1872, he was elected a Canal Commissioner on the Republican ticket, and died a month before the end of his term.

He was married to Ella M. Bruce (1842-1919, daughter of Canal Commissioner Benjamin F. Bruce).

He died of typhoid fever at the Syracuse House in Syracuse, NY.

== Sources ==
- The Candidate for Canal Commissioner in NYT on August 24, 1872
- Editorial endorsing Stroud, in NYT on November 2, 1872
- Obit in NYT on December 3, 1875
