= John D. Fay =

John Doane Fay (April 20, 1815 in Northampton, then Montgomery Co., now in Fulton County, New York – June 6, 1895 in Rochester, Monroe County, New York) was an American civil engineer and politician from New York

== Life ==
He was educated at Lowville, New York. On May 6, 1839, he married Caroline M. Saxton, and they had one child. Caroline Fay died on October 11, 1841.

Fay participated with Stephen Clark in re-constructing the Long Bridge over the Potomac, and was a Resident Engineer on the New York State canals from 1841 to 1849. On October 23, 1845, he married Maria Lydia Noble (b. April 24, 1824), and they had eight children.

In 1850, Fay and Orville W. Childs were sent to Nicaragua by Cornelius Vanderbilt to make a survey for the proposed Nicaragua canal. He was Division Engineer of the Western Division of the State Canals from 1852 to 1853, from 1856 to 1860, and from 1874 to 1875.

In 1853, he ran for New York State Engineer and Surveyor on the Hard ticket but was defeated by Whig John T. Clark. In 1855, he ran again but was again defeated, this time by American Silas Seymour.

From 1868 to 1873 he was a Canal Commissioner, elected in 1867 and 1870 on the Democratic ticket.

== Sources ==
- Bios of Engineers, at Rochester history
- Fay Genealogy (1898; pages 48, 90 and 142)
