= Frederick W. Loew =

Frederick William Loew (December 20, 1834 – November 7, 1909) was a French-American lawyer and judge from New York City.

== Life ==
Loew was born on December 20, 1834, in Alsace, France, the son of Frederick J. and Salome Loew. He immigrated to America with his family in 1838 and attended school in New York City, New York. His brothers included New York City Comptroller Edward V. Loew and County Clerk Charles L. Loew.

Loew's father died when he was around sixteen, leaving him with his mother and four younger brothers. He attended English, French, and German schools in New York City. Interested in becoming an engraver, he studied under one of the best engravers in the city. By the time he turned 20, he received two silver medals and a Webster's dictionary for his medallion dies and other work, which was exhibited at the American Institute and other expositions. His work negatively impacted his health, which led his physician to advice him to go South. He then traveled on the steamer Crescent City, which shipwrecked on the Bahama Banks on December 7, 1855. He was rescued and sailed to Nassau, Havana, New Orleans (where he was seriously ill for some time), and finally home to New York City. As his health obligated him to pick a more active profession, he became a law clerk for the New York City Sheriff.

Loew read law and was admitted to the bar in 1860. He then began a successful law practice, specializing in examining titles to real estate and conveying. In 1863, he was elected a Justice of the Fifth District Court of New York City. He was then elected a delegate for the 1867-1868 New York State Constitutional Convention. In 1869, Governor John T. Hoffman appointed him Judge of the Court of Common Pleas to succeed George C. Barrett. He was elected to a full term later that month. In 1875, Governor Samuel J. Tilden appointed him to hold a special term in the New York Supreme Court for the trial of jury cases. Later that year, he was the Democratic candidate for reelection to the Court of Common Pleas, but he lost to the Republican candidate.

In 1877, Loew was elected Register of New York City. He served as Register from 1878 to 1880, after which he retired from work due to his poor health. He then spent the last few decades of his life traveling abroad, frequently spending winters in Paris with his family.

In 1867, Loew married Julia Augusta Vanderpoel, daughter of Dock Commissioner Jacob Vanderpoel and a member of a Dutch family who settled in New Amsterdam in the earliest days of the colony. They had two children, Charles E. and a daughter.

Loew died at home from apoplexy on November 7, 1909. He was buried in Green-Wood Cemetery.
