= George W. Little =

American politician

George W. Little was an American politician from New York.

== Life ==
He lived in Otsego County, New York.

In February 1842, he was elected by the New York State Legislature a Canal Commissioner, and was in office until February 3, 1845. Afterwards he was Deputy State Treasurer.

== Sources ==
- The New York Civil List compiled by Franklin Benjamin Hough (page 42; Weed, Parsons and Co., 1858)
- Political History of the State of New York from January 1, 1841, to January 1, 1847, Vol III, including the Life of Silas Wright by Jabez Delano Hammond (Hall & Dickson, Syracuse NY, 1848) Google Books, page 525
- The American Almanac and Repository of Useful Knowledge by Jared Sparks, Francis Bowen & George Partridge Sanger (Gray and Bowen, 1847; page 245)
