= Thomas Clowes =

American judge

Thomas Clowes (August 5, 1791 Marblehead, Essex County, Massachusetts - April 9, 1866) was an American lawyer and politician from New York.

== Life ==
His father and uncles were seafaring men. While a boy he went to sea with his uncle, making two voyages across the Atlantic Ocean. In 1808, he went to live with an uncle, who had settled in Brunswick, Rensselaer County, New York, with the promise of becoming heir to his property. After the death of his uncle, he went to the county seat Troy, New York, to settle the estate, but eventually remained there and studied law at the office of Ross & McConihe. On July 6, 1818, he married Nancy Cox, but of their children only one daughter reached maturity.

He was Surrogate of Rensselaer County from 1821 to 1827.

From 1840 to 1844, he was a Canal Appraiser.

In November 1846, he was elected on the Whig and Anti-Rent tickets a Canal Commissioner. Under the Act of May 6, 1844, there were two canal commissioners to be elected to a four-year term beginning on February 1, 1847, but at the same State election the voters ratified the New York State Constitution of 1846 which extended the terms of the incumbent commissioners until the end of 1847, calling for a new election in November 1847. Thus Clowes could not take office for his elected term. However, on November 1, 1847, Commissioner Nathaniel Jones resigned, and Clowes was elected by the New York State Legislature on November 15 to fill the vacancy, and remained in office for six weeks, until the end of the year.

In 1849, he was appointed by President Zachary Taylor Postmaster of Troy. In March 1851, he was removed by President Millard Fillmore. He was again appointed Postmaster of Troy by President Abraham Lincoln in 1862, and re-appointed by President Andrew Johnson, and died in office.

== Sources ==
- The New York Civil List compiled by Franklin Benjamin Hough (pages 42f and 417; Weed, Parsons and Co., 1858)
- The New-York Civil List compiled by Franklin Benjamin Hough, Stephen C. Hutchins & Edgar Albert Werner (pages 247f; Weed, Parsons and Co., Albany NY, 1867)
- The election in 1846, in Political History of the State of New York from January 1, 1841, to January 1, 1847, Vol III, including The Life of Silas Wright by Jabez Delano Hammond (L. W. Hall, Syracuse NY, 1849; page 689)
- Federal appointments, among them a new postmaster at Troy, in NYT on May 19, 1866
- The Rise and Fall of the American Whig Party: Jacksonian Politics and the Onset of the Civil War by Michael F. Holt (Oxford University Press US, 2003, ISBN 0-19-516104-1, ISBN 978-0-19-516104-5 ; pages 650f)
- Bio, and portrait, in History of Rensselaer Co., New York by Nathaniel Bartlett Sylvester (1880) [has a few typos]
