= Fordyce L. Laflin =

American politician

Personal details
- Born: March 9, 1824 Blandford, Hampden County, Massachusetts
- Died: April 24, 1887 (aged 63) Saugerties, Ulster County, New York
- Children: 1
- Occupation: Politician, businessman

Fordyce Luther Laflin (March 9, 1824 Blandford, Hampden County, Massachusetts - April 27, 1887 Saugerties, Ulster County, New York) was an American businessman and politician from New York.

== Life ==
He was the son of Luther Laflin (1789–1876) and Almira Sylvester Laflin (1801–1882). His family was in the gunpowder business from before 1800 until 1912 when the companies were bought by DuPont. His father and uncle had opened a factory at Saugerties in 1832 after their removal from Massachusetts where they had had a gunpowder factory in Southwick.

He was Supervisor of the Town of Saugerties for two years, and President of the Village of Saugerties in 1851.

On September 21, 1851, he married Helen Miranda Burtt (d. 1896), and they had several children.

He was a member of the New York State Assembly (Ulster Co., 1st D.) in 1858.

He was an Inspector of State Prisons from 1870 to 1872, elected on the Democratic ticket at the New York state election, 1869.

He died of "blood poisoning, resulting from an abscess which followed a severe attack of inflammatory rheumatism." He was buried at the Mountain View Cemetery in Saugerties.

== Sources ==
- DIED OF BLOOD POISONING in NYT on April 28, 1887
- Cemetery records, at Hope Farm
- History of the Laflins' gunpowder business, at The Cartridge Collector's Exchange
- Political Graveyard
- The New York Civil List compiled by Franklin Benjamin Hough, Stephen C. Hutchins and Edgar Albert Werner (1867; pages 411, 487 and 515)
