= George F. Comstock =

American judge (1811–1892)

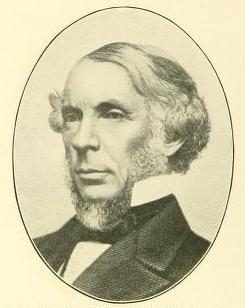
George F. Comstock

George Franklin Comstock (August 24, 1811 – September 27, 1892) was an American lawyer and politician. He was Chief Judge of the New York Court of Appeals from 1860 to 1861.

== Personal life ==
Comstock was born on August 24, 1811, in Williamstown, New York. He graduated from Union College in 1834. Then he studied law and was admitted to the bar in 1837. He was married to Cornelia, daughter of his friend and law partner, B. Davis Noxon, and had a son and daughter. Comstock died in Syracuse on September 27, 1892, and was buried at the Oakwood Cemetery.

== Career ==
Comstock was Solicitor of the United States Treasury from 1852 to 1853, during the administration of President Millard Fillmore.

He was a judge of the New York Court of Appeals from 1856 to 1861, elected on the American Party ticket to fill the remainder of the unexpired term of Charles H. Ruggles who had resigned in October 1855. In 1856, Union College conferred the honorary degree of LL.D. on him. He was Chief Judge from 1860 to 1861. He published the first four volumes of the law reports of the Court of Appeals. In 1861, he ran for re-election on the Democratic ticket, but was defeated by the Union candidate William B. Wright.

== Syracuse University ==
Comstock was an influential figure in the founding of Syracuse University and a member of the new university's board of trustees. In 1870, he donated fifty acres of farmland on a hillside to the southeast of the city center, then valued at $60,000, to establish the university. He also donated additional $35,000. Comstock intended Syracuse University and the hill to develop as an integrated whole; a contemporary account described the latter as "a beautiful town ... springing up on the hillside and a community of refined and cultivated membership ... established near the spot which will soon be the center of a great and beneficent educational institution."

=== Comstock tract of buildings ===
The Comstock Tract Buildings, a historic district of older buildings on the Syracuse University campus, was listed on the National Register of Historic Places in 1980. Three buildings on campus—the Crouse Memorial College and the Hall of Languages, and the Pi Chapter House of Psi Upsilon Fraternity—are individually listed on the National Register.

Legal offices
Preceded by Alexander S. Johnson	Chief Judge of the New York Court of Appeals; 1860–1861	Succeeded by Samuel L. Selden
