= Abraham B. Tappen =

American politician (1823–1896)

New York State Prison Inspector
- In office January 1, 1862 – December 31, 1864

Member of the New York State Assembly from the Westchester 1st district
- In office January 1, 1858 – December 31, 1858

Personal details
- Born: Abraham Bogardus Tappen; January 31, 1823 New Hamburg, New York, U.S.
- Died: June 1, 1896 (aged 73) New York City, U.S.
- Resting place: Woodlawn Cemetery, New York City, U.S.
- Party: Union
- Occupation: Politician, lawyer

Abraham Bogardus Tappen (January 31, 1823, in New Hamburg, Dutchess County, New York – June 1, 1896, in Fordham, New York City) was an American lawyer and politician from New York.

== Life ==
He was born on January 31, 1823, in New Hamburg, New York, to Archibald Tappen and Margaret Maria Bogardus.

He was a member of the New York State Assembly (Westchester Co., 1st D.) in 1858. From 1862 to 1864, he was an Inspector of State Prisons, elected on the Union ticket at the New York state election, 1861. He was a delegate to the New York State Constitutional Convention of 1867–68. In 1868, he was elected to the New York Supreme Court (2nd District).

He was a New York City Park Commissioner from 1891 to 1895, appointed by Mayor Hugh J. Grant to fill the vacancy caused by the death of Waldo Hutchins, and re-appointed to a full five-year term, but removed from office by Mayor William L. Strong.

He was once Grand Sachem of the Tammany Society.

He died on June 1, 1896, in Fordham, Bronx. He was buried at the Woodlawn Cemetery.

== Sources ==
- The New York Civil List compiled by Franklin Benjamin Hough, Stephen C. Hutchins and Edgar Albert Werner (1867; pages 411, 487 and 511)
- OBITUARY RECORD.; Abraham B. Tappen in NYT on June 2, 1896
