= 1869 New York state election =

- November 2, 1869

The 1869 New York state election was held on November 2, 1869, to elect the Secretary of State, the State Comptroller, the Attorney General, the State Treasurer, the State Engineer, two Judges of the New York Court of Appeals, a Canal Commissioners and an Inspector of State Prisons, as well as all members of the New York State Assembly and the New York State Senate. Besides, the amended State Constitution was rejected with 223,935 votes for and 290,456 against it. Only the "Judicial Article" which re-organized the New York Court of Appeals was adopted by a small majority, with 247,240 for and 240,442 against it.

== History ==
The Republican state convention met on September 24 at Syracuse, New York. George William Curtis was nominated for Secretary of State, Thomas Hillhouse was nominated for Comptroller and John C. Robinson was nominated for State Engineer. They declined to run, and Sigel, Greeley and Taylor were substituted by the State Committee.

== Results ==
The whole Democratic state ticket was elected.

The incumbents Nelson, Allen, Champlain, Bristol and Richmond were re-elected. The incumbents Woodruff, Mason and Hayt were defeated.

18 Democrats and 14 Republicans were elected to a two-year term (1870–1871) in the New York State Senate.

73 Democrats and 55 Republicans were elected for the session of 1870 to the New York State Assembly.

1869 state election results
Office	Democratic ticket		Republican ticket	
Secretary of State	Homer A. Nelson	330,974	Franz Sigel	310,733
Comptroller	William F. Allen	330,371	Horace Greeley	307,668
Attorney General	Marshall B. Champlain	336,774	Martin I. Townsend	306,133
Treasurer	Wheeler H. Bristol	335,942	Thomas I. Chatfield	306,800
State Engineer	Van Rensselaer Richmond	335,577	William B. Taylor	307,397
Judge of the Court of Appeals (full term)	John A. Lott	328,988	Charles Mason	290,238
Judge of the Court of Appeals (short term)	Robert Earl	328,544	Lewis B. Woodruff	289,965
Canal Commissioner	William W. Wright	336,513	Stephen T. Hayt	306,802
Inspector of State Prisons	Fordyce L. Laflin	335,702	Daniel D. Conover	307,235

== See also ==
- New York state elections

== Sources ==
Result in The Tribune Almanac for 1870 compiled by Horace Greeley of the New York Tribune
