= Benjamin F. Bruce =

American politician

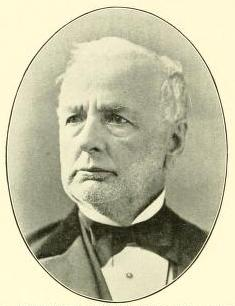
Benjamin F. Bruce

Benjamin Franklin Bruce (1811 Lenox, Madison County, New York - December 20, 1888 Lenox, Madison County, NY) was an American politician from New York.

== Life ==
He was a delegate to the New York State Constitutional Convention of 1846. He was Inspector-General of the New York State Militia from 1851 to 1852, and from 1855 to 1858. He was a member of the New York Republican State Committee in 1858.

In January 1861, he was elected Canal Commissioner by the New York State Legislature to fill the vacancy caused by the death of Samuel H. Barnes who had been elected in November 1860, but died soon after. In 1861 he ran for re-election on the Republican ticket, but was defeated by Democrat William W. Wright.

In 1863, he was elected again a Canal Commissioner, this time on the Union ticket, and was in office from 1864 to 1866.

He was a member of the New York State Assembly (Madison County 2nd D.) in 1867.

His daughter was married to Canal Commissioner Reuben W. Stroud.

== Sources ==
- The Rep. state committee in NYT on July 9, 1858
- The Union State Convention in NYT on September 3, 1863
- Journal of the New York State Senate 1861 (pages 68ff)
- Madison County Civil List, at RootsWeb
- Political Graveyard
- The New York Civil List compiled by Franklin Benjamin Hough, Stephen C. Hutchins and Edgar Albert Werner (1867; pages 400, 406 and 505)
- The New York Civil List compiled by Franklin Benjamin Hough (page 59; Weed, Parsons and Co., 1858)

New York State Assembly
Preceded by Caleb Calkins	New York State Assembly; Madison County, 2nd District; 1867	Succeeded by D. Gerry Wellington
