= John A. Lott =

American judge and politician from New York State (1806–1878)

John Abraham Lott (February 11, 1806 – July 20, 1878) was an American lawyer and politician from New York.

== Life ==
Lott was born and raised in Flatbush, Kings County, New York. He was the son of Abraham Lott and Maria Lott. He was educated at the Flatbush Academy and graduated from Union College in 1823. Then he studied law with Henry E. Werner in New York City. On February 16, 1829, he married his first cousin Catherine Lott (b. 1807). In 1835, he began practicing law in Brooklyn with Henry C. Murphy, and soon entered politics as a Democrat.

In 1838, Lott was appointed by Governor William L. Marcy Judge of the Kings County Court. He was a member of the New York State Assembly (Kings Co.) in 1842. He was a member of the New York State Senate (1st D.) from 1843 to 1846, sitting in the 66th, 67th, 68th and 69th New York State Legislatures. In 1849, he ran on the Democratic ticket for New York State Comptroller, but was defeated by the incumbent Whig Washington Hunt.

He was a justice of the New York Supreme Court (2nd District) from 1858 to 1869, elected in 1857 to fill the vacancy caused by the death of William Rockwell, and re-elected in 1861 to a full eight-year term. He was ex officio a judge of the Court of Appeals in 1861 and 1869.

In 1869, he was elected to an eight-year term on the New York Court of Appeals, but at the same election a constitutional amendment re-organized the Court of Appeals, and Lott remained on the bench only for six months, until July 4, 1870, when the new judges took office. However, Lott was appointed a Commissioner of Appeals.

In 1874, he was made president of the Brooklyn, Flatbush and Coney Island Railway, but resigned a few weeks before his death. At the time of his death he was president of the Flatbush Board of Improvement. During the last two years of his life, he had suffered from diabetes. He died suddenly, dropping dead in the bathroom of his residence in Flatbush, Kings Co., NY. He was buried at the Green-Wood Cemetery in Brooklyn.

== Sources ==
- Court of Appeals judges
- The New York Civil List compiled by Franklin Benjamin Hough (pages 134f, 143, 226, 288 and 350; Weed, Parsons and Co., 1858)
- TWO NOTED JURISTS DEAD.; JUDGE LOTT STRICKEN DOWN WITHOUT WARNING in NYT on July 21, 1878 [gives wrong birthyear "1805"]
- Genealogy of the Lefferts Family, 1650-1878 by Teunis G. Bergen (BiblioBazaar, LLC, 2009, ISBN 0-559-99883-X, ISBN 978-0-559-99883-6 ; page 89)
- The Twentieth Century Biographical Dictionary of Notable Americans edited by Rossiter Johnson & John Howard Brown (The Biographical Society, 1904)
- Historical Sketch of the Zabriskie Homestead (removed 1877), Flatbush, L.I.: with biographical accounts of some of those who have resided in it by P. L. Schenck, A. O. Zabriskie & Jeremiah Lott (1881)
- FUNERAL OF EX-JUDGE LOTT in NYT on July 24, 1878

New York State Senate
Preceded by Gabriel Furman	New York State Senate; First District (Class 4); 1843 – 1846	Succeeded by John Townsend
