= Robert S. Hale =

American politician

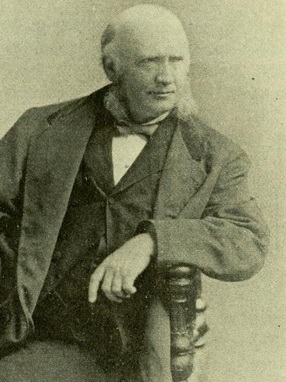

Judge of New York Surrogate's Court
- In office 1856–1864

Member of the U.S. House of Representatives from New York
- In office November 7, 1865 – March 3, 1867
- Preceded by: Orlando Kellogg
- Succeeded by: Orange Ferriss
- Constituency: 16th district
- In office March 4, 1873 – March 3, 1875
- Preceded by: William A. Wheeler
- Succeeded by: Martin I. Townsend
- Constituency: 17th district

Chairman of the House Committee on the District of Columbia
- In office March 4, 1873 – March 3, 1875

Personal details
- Born: September 24, 1822 Chelsea, Vermont, U.S.
- Died: December 14, 1881 (aged 59) Elizabethtown, New York, U.S.
- Party: Republican
- Spouse: Lovina Sibley Stone
- Education: University of Vermont
- Profession: Lawyer

Robert Safford Hale (September 24, 1822 – December 14, 1881) was a U.S. representative from New York.

Born in Chelsea, Vermont, Hale attended South Royalton (Vermont) Academy, and was graduated from the University of Vermont at Burlington in 1842. He studied law. He was admitted to the bar and commenced practice in Elizabethtown, New York, in 1847. He served as judge of Essex County 1856–1864.

He was elected a Regent of the University of the State of New York in 1859.

In the 1860 presidential election, he was a presidential elector for Abraham Lincoln and Hannibal Hamiln.

He served as special counsel of the United States charged with the defense of the "abandoned and captured property claims" 1868–1870 and as Agent and counsel for the United States before the American and British Mixed Commission under the Treaty of Washington 1871–1873.

Hale was elected as a Republican to the Thirty-ninth Congress to fill the vacancy caused by the death of Orlando Kellogg and served from December 3, 1866, to March 3, 1867.

Hale was elected to the Forty-third Congress (March 4, 1873 – March 3, 1875). He served as chairman of the Committee on District of Columbia (Forty-third Congress).

He was not a candidate for reelection in 1874.

He was appointed a commissioner of the State survey April 29, 1876, in which capacity he was serving when he died in Elizabethtown, New York, on December 14, 1881. He was interred in Riverside Cemetery.

State Senator Matthew Hale (1829–1897) was his brother.

U.S. House of Representatives
Preceded by Orlando Kellogg	Member of the U.S. House of Representatives from New York's 16th congressional district 1865–1867	Succeeded by Orange Ferriss
Preceded by William A. Wheeler	Member of the U.S. House of Representatives from New York's 17th congressional district 1873–1875	Succeeded by Martin I. Townsend
