= Marshall B. Champlain =

American politician (1824–1879)

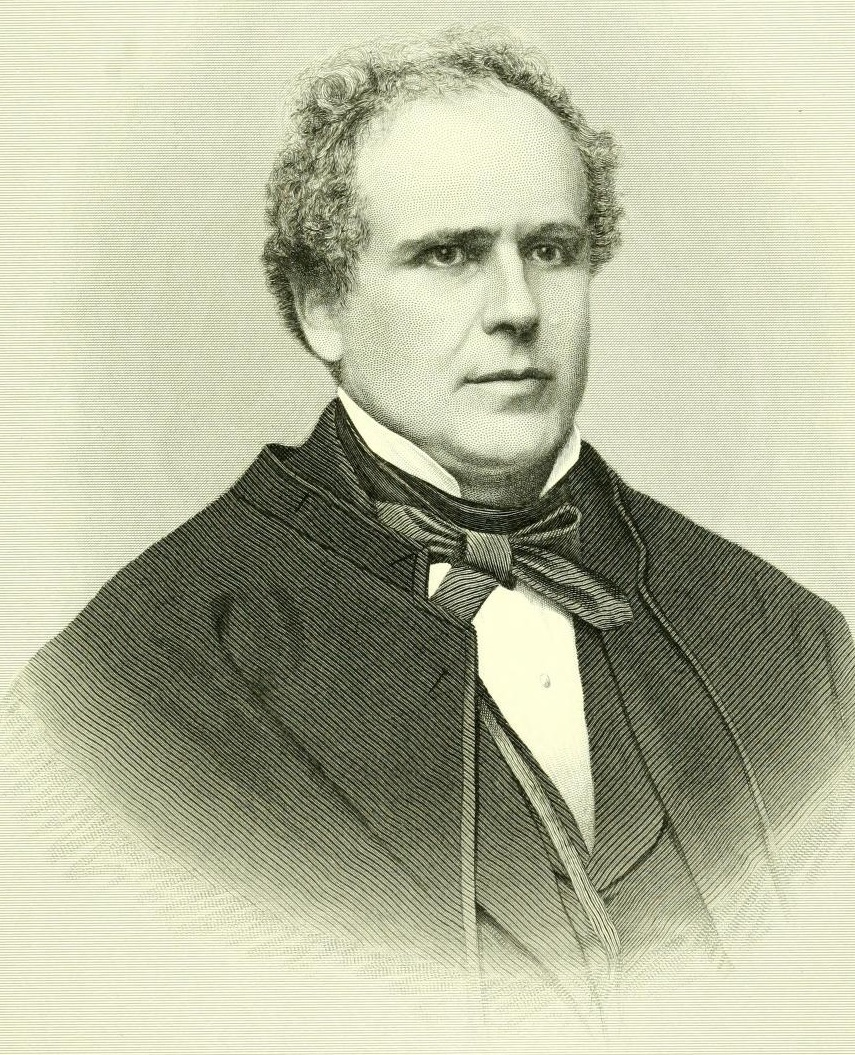
- From 1896's Allegany County and Its People

New York Attorney General
- In office January 1, 1868 – December 31, 1871

Personal details
- Born: December 22, 1824 Stafford, New York, US
- Died: March 7, 1879 (aged 54) Cuba, New York, US
- Occupation: Lawyer, politician

Marshall Bolds Champlain (December 22, 1824, in Stafford, Genesee County, New York – March 7, 1879, in Cuba, Allegany County, New York) was an American lawyer and politician.

== Personal life ==
Marshall B. Champlain was born in 1824. He died of pneumonia in 1879.

== Legal career ==
He was admitted to the bar in 1843 and practiced at Cuba, N.Y. He was District Attorney of Allegany County in 1845.

He was a member of the New York State Assembly (Allegany Co., 2nd D.) in 1853; and was one of the Managers who prosecuted the impeachment of Canal Commissioner John C. Mather. He also successfully prosecuted Edward H. Rulloff for murder. Another of his cases was against the Erie Railway Company.

== Political career ==
He was a delegate to the 1860 Democratic National Convention at Charleston, South Carolina, and to the 1864 Democratic National Convention at Chicago.

In 1861 and 1863, he was the Democratic candidate for New York State Attorney General but was defeated by his former fellow Democrats Daniel S. Dickinson and John Cochrane, who were nominated by Union conventions of Republicans and War Democrats. In 1867, he finally was elected, and re-elected in 1869, to the office. In 1871 he was defeated when running for re-election.

He was a delegate to the New York State Constitutional Convention of 1867.

== Sources ==
- His obit, in NYT on March 10, 1879 [erroneously stating he was DA of Genesee Co., and stating that he was a descendant of Samuel de Champlain who had no known descendants]
- Political Graveyard
- Google Books The New York Civil List compiled by Franklin Benjamin Hough (Weed, Parsons and Co., 1858) [name given on page 264 as Marshall B. Chaplin, on page 370 as Champlin]
- Google Books The New York State Register for 1843 edited by O. L. Holley (page 360, J. Disturnell, Albany NY, 1843) [listed as Marshall B. Champlin, Master in Chancery, not DA]
- Google Books The New York State Register for 1847 edited by Orville Luther Holley (page 38 and 126, J. Disturnell, New York NY, 1847) [listed as Marshall B. Champlin, attorney at law; Lucien P. Wetherby is DA at this time]
- His nomination, in NYT on September 22, 1861 [name given as Marshal B. Champlin]

New York State Assembly
Preceded by John R. Hartshorn	New York State Assembly; Allegany County, 2nd District; 1853	Succeeded by Lucius S. May
Legal offices
Preceded by John H. Martindale	New York State Attorney General; 1868–1871	Succeeded by Francis C. Barlow
