= Stephen T. Hayt =

American politician (1822–1907)

Stephen Thurston Hayt (June 5, 1822 in Ithaca, Tompkins County, New York – August 31, 1907 in Corning, Steuben County, New York) was an American politician from New York.

== Life ==
He was the son of John C. Hayt (1787–1854) and Martha (Towner) Hayt. On November 19, 1856, he married Margaret C. Townsend at Palmyra, New York. Their son was Stephen Thurston Hayt Jr.

He was a delegate to the 1860, 1868 and 1884 Republican National Conventions.

He was a member of the New York State Senate (27th D.) from 1864 to 1866, sitting in the 87th, 88th and 89th New York State Legislatures.

At the New York state election, 1866, he was elected a Canal Commissioner on the Republican ticket, and was in office from 1867 to 1869. He was defeated for re-election at the New York state election, 1869 by Democrat William W. Wright.

He was buried at the Mount Hope Cemetery in Corning, NY.

== Sources ==
- Political Graveyard
- The New York Civil List compiled by Franklin Benjamin Hough, Stephen C. Hutchins and Edgar Albert Werner (1867; pages 400, 406 and 505)
- Entry at FreePages Genealogy
- A Genealogical History of the Hoyt, Haight, and Hight Families by David Webster Hoyt (Printed for the author by the Providence Press Co., 1871; page 500)

New York State Senate
Preceded by Charles Cook	New York State Senate; 27th District; 1864–1866	Succeeded by John I. Nicks
