= William W. Wright =

American politician (1813–1889)

William Westwood Wright (April 28, 1813 in Adams, Jefferson County, New York – June 12, 1889 in Geneva, Ontario County, New York) was an American politician from New York.

== Life ==
He married Mary L. Ryker (1822–1900).

He was a delegate to the 1860 Democratic National Convention at Charleston, South Carolina.

In 1860, he ran for Canal Commissioner on the Douglas Democratic ticket, but was defeated by Republican Samuel H. Barnes. Barnes died a week after the election, and the vacancy was filled temporarily by the New York State Legislature in January 1861. Wright was the Democratic candidate, but was defeated by Republican Benjamin F. Bruce. In November 1861 he ran again, for the remaining two years of Barnes's term, and this time was elected defeating Bruce and War Democrat Frederick A. Tallmadge. He was in office from 1862 to 1863. In 1863, he ran for re-election, but was this time was defeated again by Bruce. In 1866, he ran again but was defeated by Republican Stephen T. Hayt. In 1869, he was elected again a Canal Commissioner, and was in office from 1870 to 1872.

In 1886, he was chosen Vice President of the Buffalo and Geneva Railroad.

He was buried at the Glenwood Cemetery in Geneva, NY.

== Sources ==
- Journal of the New York State Senate 1861 (pages 68ff)
- The New York Civil List compiled by Franklin Benjamin Hough, Stephen C. Hutchins and Edgar Albert Werner (1867; page 406)
- Political Graveyard
- The Buffalo and Geneva Railroad in ELECTING ITS FIRST OFFICERS in NYT on January 22, 1882
- The tickets for the state election, in NYT on November 1, 1869
- His wife's death notice, in NYT on August 22, 1900 [gives wrong middle initial "A."]
- Burial records transcribed at RootsWeb
