= Horatio Ballard =

American lawyer and politician

Horatio Ballard (August 1803 – October 8, 1879) was an American lawyer and politician who was New York Secretary of State from January 1, 1862 to December 31, 1863.

== Life ==
He was born in Homer, New York in 1803 and educated in the Pompey and Cortland Academies. He studied law with Judge Stephens of Cortland and Freeborn G. Jewett of Skaneateles. After being admitted to practice at the age of twenty-four, he partnered with Stephens in Cortland for many years. In 1842, he succeeded Shankland as district attorney. He was a delegate to the 1844 and 1856 Democratic National Conventions. On June 9, 1847, he married Sarah N. Fairchild. He was elected Secretary of State of New York in 1861. He was a member of the New York State Assembly (Cortland Co.) in 1867. He was a delegate to the New York State Constitutional Convention of 1867–68, playing an important role. He died at his residence in Cortland, N.Y.

Political offices
Preceded by David R. Floyd-Jones	Secretary of State of New York; 1862 - 1863	Succeeded by Chauncey Depew
New York State Assembly
Preceded by Stephen Patrick	New York State Assembly; Cortland County; 1867	Succeeded by Raymond P. Babcock
