= Samuel S. Whallon =

American politician

Samuel S. Whallon (April 20, 1804 Argyle, Washington County, New York - July 6, 1858 Erie, Erie County, Pennsylvania) was an American merchant and politician from New York.

== Life ==
About 1812. his family removed to Mayville, New York. In 1834, he was one of the co-founders of the Mayville Sentinel, but already the next year the newspaper was sold.

He was a member of the New York State Assembly (Chautauqua Co., 1st D.) in 1855.

He was a Canal Commissioner from 1856 until his death, elected at the 1855 New York state election on the American Party ticket.

He died of scarlet fever.

== Sources ==
- Obit in NYT on July 8, 1858 {gives July 6 as death date]
- Political Graveyard
- The New York Civil List compiled by Franklin Benjamin Hough (pages 42, 248 and 315; Weed, Parsons and Co., 1858)
- Annual Obituary Notices of Eminent Persons who Have Died in the United States: For 1857-1858 compiled by Nathan Crosby (Phillips, Sampson and Co., 1859; page 377) [gives July 6 as death date, and gives wrong election year for canal commissioner "1856" (he was elected in 1855)]
- The New York Civil List compiled by Franklin Benjamin Hough, Stephen C. Hutchins and Edgar Albert Werner (1867; page 406) [gives July 5 as death date]
