= William F. Allen (New York politician) =

American judge

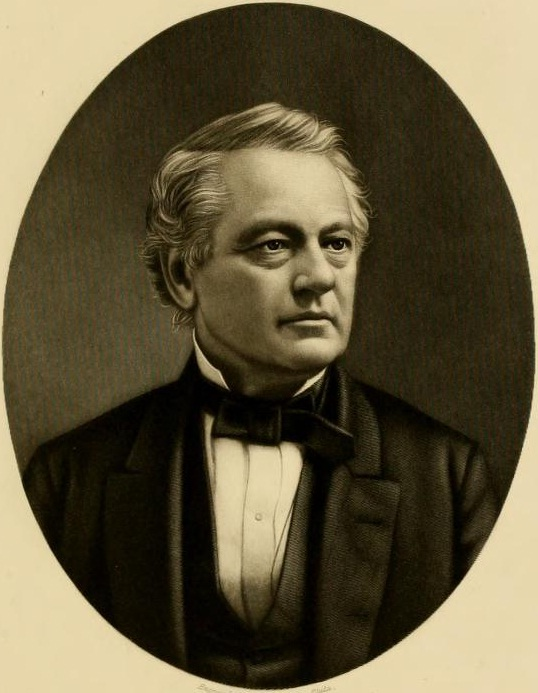
William F. Allen (1877)

William Fitch Allen (July 28, 1808 – June 3, 1878) was an American lawyer and politician.

== Life ==
He was born on July 28, 1808, in Windham County, Connecticut, the eldest son of Abner Harvey Allen and Cynthia Palmer, a sister of the mother of Sanford E. Church. He graduated from Union College in 1826. Then he studied law in the office of John C. Wright at Esperance, New York, and in the office of C. M. and E. S. Lee at Rochester, New York. He was admitted to the bar in 1829, and commenced practice in partnership with George Fisher at Oswego until 1833. In 1834, he formed a partnership with Abraham P. Grant which continued until his election to the New York Supreme Court. He was Supervisor of the Town of Oswego in 1836 and 1837.

Allen was a Democratic member of the New York State Assembly in 1843 and 1844. From 1845 to 1847, he was United States Attorney for the Northern District of New York. He was a justice of the New York Supreme Court from 1847 to 1863, and sat ex officio on the Court of Appeals in 1854 and 1862. In 1863, he removed to New York City and resumed the practice of law there.

He was New York State Comptroller from 1868 to 1870, elected at the New York state election, 1867; and re-elected at the New York state election, 1869. He resigned this office in June 1870.

At the New York special judicial election, 1870, he was elected to the New York Court of Appeals, and in July 1870 became one of the first judges of the new court upon its re-organization after the amendment of the State Constitution in 1869. He remained on the bench until his death on June 3, 1878, in Oswego, New York.

== Sources ==
Political offices
Preceded by Thomas Hillhouse	New York State Comptroller; 1868–1870	Succeeded by Asher P. Nichols
