= Martin Grover =

American judge

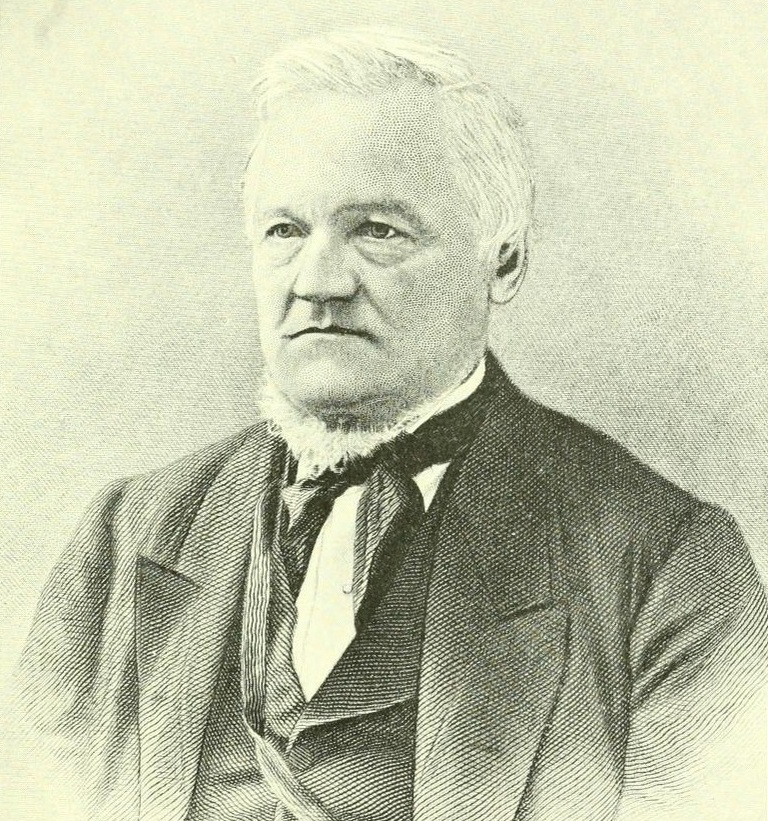

Member of the U.S. House of Representatives from New York's 30th district
- In office March 4, 1845 – March 3, 1847
- Preceded by: William Spring Hubbell
- Succeeded by: David Rumsey

Personal details
- Born: October 20, 1811 Hartwick, New York, U.S.
- Died: August 23, 1875 (aged 63) Troy, New York, U.S.
- Resting place: Angelica Cemetery
- Party: Democratic
- Occupation: Politician, attorney, jurist

Martin Grover (October 20, 1811 Hartwick, Otsego County, New York – August 23, 1875 Angelica, Allegany County, New York) was an American lawyer, jurist, and politician from New York. He served one term in the United States House of Representatives from 1845 to 1847 and later as a justice on the New York Supreme Court from 1857 to 1867.

== Early life and education ==
He attended the common schools, studied law, was admitted to the bar and commenced practice in Angelica, N.Y.

== Political career ==
=== U.S. House ===
He was elected as a Democrat to the 29th United States Congress, holding office from March 4, 1845, to March 3, 1847.

In 1853, he ran for New York State Attorney General on the Soft ticket, but was defeated by Whig Ogden Hoffman.

=== Judicial posts ===
In November 1857, he was elected a justice of the New York Supreme Court to fill the vacancy caused by the resignation of James Mullett. He was re-elected in 1859 and remained on the Supreme Court bench until the end of 1867. He was ex officio a judge of the New York Court of Appeals (8th District) in 1859 and 1867.

In 1865, he ran for the remaining six years of the term of Henry R. Selden on the Court of Appeals but was defeated by Republican John K. Porter who had been appointed to fill temporarily the vacancy caused by Selden's resignation.

In November 1867, he was elected a judge of the New York Court of Appeals for a term of eight years. Although he was legislated out of office upon the re-organization of the Court of Appeals in 1870, he was the only judge who continued on the Court of Appeals bench, having been re-elected to a 14-year term in May 1870.

== Death ==
He died in office and was buried at the Angelica Cemetery.

== Sources ==
- United States Congress. "Martin Grover (id: G000506)". Biographical Directory of the United States Congress.
- Candidates for office, in NYT on November 7, 1865
- The New York Civil List compiled by Franklin Benjamin Hough (page 352; Weed, Parsons and Co., 1858)
- Court of Appeals judges

U.S. House of Representatives
Preceded by William Spring Hubbell	Member of the U.S. House of Representatives from New York's 30th congressional district 1845–1847	Succeeded by David Rumsey
