= Ward Hunt =

US Supreme Court justice from 1873 to 1882

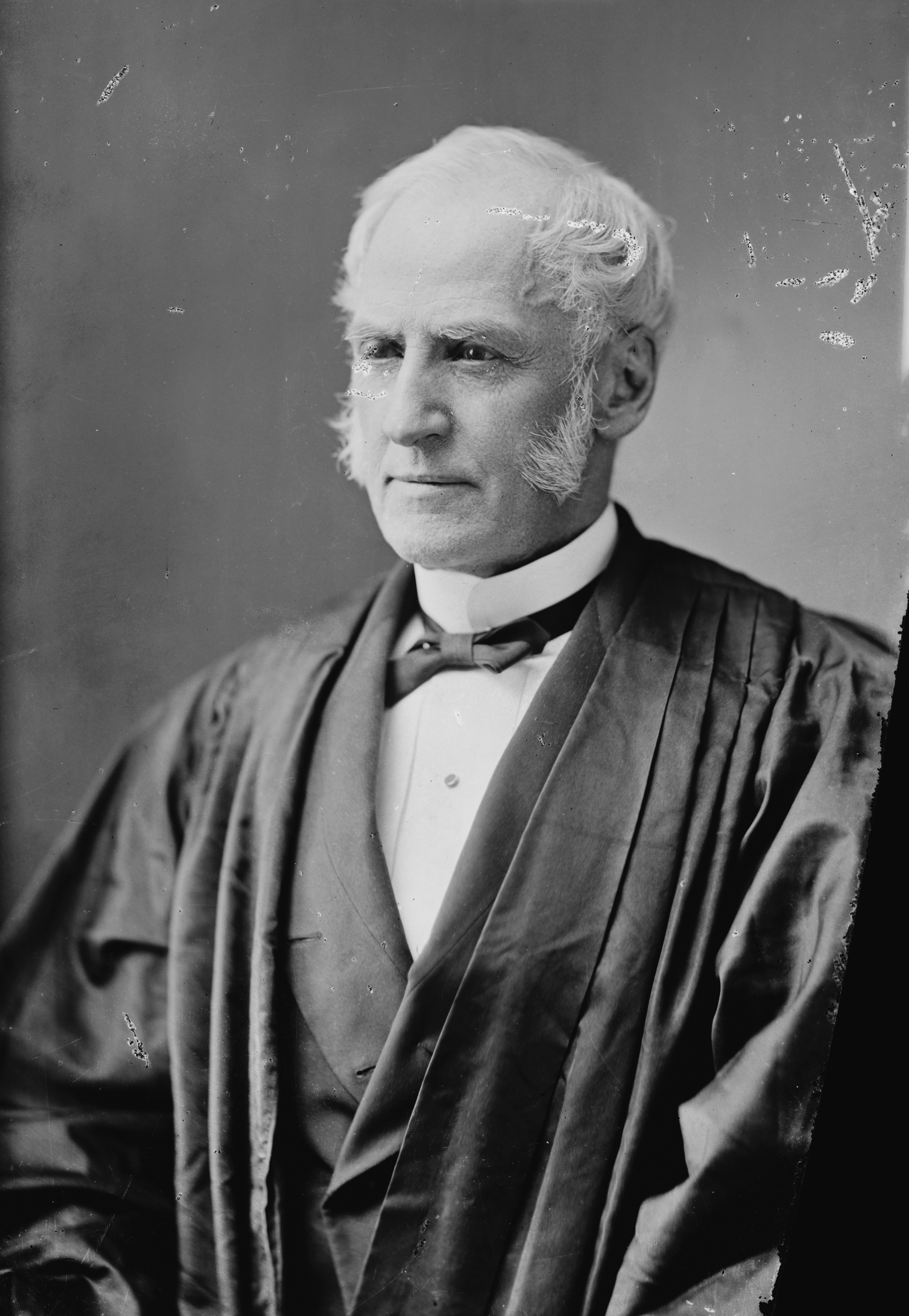
- Ward Hunt c. 1870-80

Associate Justice of the Supreme Court of the United States
- In office January 9, 1873 – January 27, 1882
- Nominated by: Ulysses S. Grant
- Preceded by: Samuel Nelson
- Succeeded by: Samuel Blatchford

Chief Judge of the New York Court of Appeals
- In office January 12, 1868 – December 31, 1869
- Preceded by: William Wright
- Succeeded by: Robert Earl

11th Mayor of Utica
- In office 1844–1855
- Preceded by: Frederick Hollister
- Succeeded by: Edmund Wetmore

Personal details
- Born: June 14, 1810 Utica, New York, US
- Died: March 24, 1886 (aged 75) Washington, D.C., US
- Party: Democratic (Before 1848); Free Soil (1848–1854); Republican (1855–1886)
- Spouses: Mary Ann Savage (m. 1837; died 1846) Maria Taylor (m. 1853; died 1866)
- Children: 3
- Education: Union College (BA); Litchfield Law School

Ward Hunt (June 14, 1810 – March 24, 1886) was an American jurist and politician. He was Chief Judge of the New York Court of Appeals from 1868 to 1869, and an associate justice of the U.S. Supreme Court from 1872 to 1882.

== Early life, family and education ==
Hunt was the son of Montgomery James Hunt, long-time cashier of the Bank of Utica, and Elizabeth (née Stringham) Hunt. Ward attended the Oxford and Geneva Academies and was a classmate of Horatio Seymour. He attended Hamilton College in 1827, then transferred to Union College in 1828, where he was an early member of the Kappa Alpha Society.

After graduating with honors in 1828, he subsequently studied law with Judge James Gould at Litchfield Law School in Litchfield, Connecticut and with Hiram Denio in Utica, and was admitted to the bar in 1831.

== Career ==
=== Politician and attorney ===
Hunt was a Democratic member from Oneida County of the New York State Assembly in 1839, and he was Mayor of Utica in 1844. In 1848, he joined the Free Soil Party, and in 1855 he was among the founders of the New York Republican Party.

Hunt remained in private practice until 1865 when he ran for a slot on the New York Court of Appeals.

=== New York Court of Appeals ===
Hunt was elected in 1865 for an eight-year term on the New York Court of Appeals on the Republican ticket, acquiring the seat held by his former law teacher and partner Hiram Denio. Hunt became chief judge in 1868 after the sudden death of Chief Judge William B. Wright. In 1870, he was legislated out of office but was appointed one of the Commissioners of Appeals.

=== US Supreme Court ===
Hunt was a friend and patron of political boss Roscoe Conkling, who was an associate of President Ulysses S. Grant. When Samuel Nelson retired from the Supreme Court, Conkling asked Grant to nominate Hunt for the vacancy. Hunt was nominated on December 3, 1872, confirmed by the US Senate on December 11, and was sworn into office on January 9, 1873.

Hunt had relatively little impact on the court, siding with the majority in all but 22 cases in his ten years on the job and writing only four dissenting opinions. His most notable contribution came while riding circuit in New York, where he presided over United States v. Anthony. Citing the 14th Amendment, suffragist Susan B. Anthony argued that she was constitutionally guaranteed the right to vote and had not broken the law when she voted in the 1872 election. Hunt refused to allow Anthony to testify on her own behalf, allowed statements given by her at the time of her arrest to be allowed as "testimony," explicitly ordered the jury to return a guilty verdict, refused to poll the jury afterwards, and read an opinion he had written before the trial even started. Hunt found that Anthony had indeed broken the law and fined Anthony $100, which she refused to pay. Hunt then announced that Anthony would not be jailed for failure to pay the fine, a move that prevented her from appealing her case to the Supreme Court through a writ of habeas corpus.

In 1878, Hunt suffered a severe paralyzing stroke which prevented him from attending court sessions or rendering opinions. However, he refused to retire, because at the time in order to retire with a full pension, a person had to put in at least ten years of government service and be at least 70 years old. To encourage him to retire, Congress passed a special provision under which he could receive a pension if he would retire within 30 days. Hunt did so on January 27, 1882, and enjoyed his pension until his death in Washington, D.C., four years later.

== Personal life ==
On November 8, 1837, Hunt married Mary Ann Savage, the daughter of U.S. Representative and chief justice of the New York Supreme Court John Savage, and great-niece of Congressman Samuel Lyman. They had three children, one of whom died in early manhood. Together they were the parents of:

- Elizabeth Stringham "Eliza" Hunt (1838–1905), who married Arthur Breese Johnson. Johnson was the great-grandson of Second US President John Adams and great-nephew of sixth President John Quincy Adams.
- John Savage Hunt (1839–1864), who was named after Mary's father; served as a first lieutenant in the United States Civil War and died after drowning in the James River in Virginia.
- Ward Hunt, Jr. (1843–1901), who married Grace Annette Taylor

After his wife's death, he remained a widower for eight years until June 18, 1853, when he married Maria Taylor, the daughter of James Taylor, the former Cashier of the Commercial Bank of Albany.

Hunt died on March 24, 1886, in Washington, D.C.

== See also ==
- List of justices of the Supreme Court of the United States

Legal offices
| Preceded by William Wright | Chief Judge of the New York Court of Appeals; 1868–1869 | Succeeded by Robert Earl |
| Preceded by Samuel Nelson | Associate Justice of the Supreme Court of the United States; 1873–1882 | Succeeded by Samuel Blatchford |
