= William B. Wright =

American judge

- Born: April 16, 1806; Newburgh, Orange County, New York
- Died: January 12, 1868 (aged 61); Albany, New York
- Occupations: Lawyer; judge; politician

William B. Wright (April 16, 1806 – January 12, 1868) was an American lawyer and politician from New York. He was Chief Judge of the New York Court of Appeals in 1868.

== Life ==
He was born on April 16, 1806, in Newburgh, Orange County, New York, the son of Samuel Wright.

He lived at Monticello, New York, and was Surrogate of Sullivan County from 1840 to 1844. He was a delegate to the New York State Constitutional Convention of 1846. He was a Whig member of the New York State Assembly (Sullivan Co.) in 1847.

He was a justice of the New York Supreme Court from 1847 to 1861, and removed to Kingston, New York, the seat of the bench of the Third Judicial District. He was an ex officio judge of the Court of Appeals in 1847–48, 1856 and 1860.

In 1861, he was elected to the New York Court of Appeals on the Union ticket nominated by War Democrats and Republicans, and took office on January 1, 1862. He became Chief Judge on January 1, 1868, but died less than two weeks later.

He died on January 12, 1868, at Congress Hall in Albany, New York, of kidney disease; and was buried at Wiltwyck Cemetery in Kingston, New York.

== Sources ==
- Short bio at Court History
- Death notice in NYT on January 13, 1868
- Listing of judges, with portrait
- New York Union state ticket, in Harper's Weekly, September 28, 1861, pg. 611
- The New York Civil List compiled by Franklin Benjamin Hough (pages 59, 318, 351 and 410; Weed, Parsons and Co., 1858)

Legal offices
Preceded by Henry E. Davies	Chief Judge of the New York Court of Appeals; 1868	Succeeded by Ward Hunt
