= Erie Canal Commission =

Public Commission to plan the Erie Canal

The Commission to Explore a Route for a Canal to Lake Erie and Report, known as the Erie Canal Commission, was a body created by the New York State Legislature in 1810 to plan the Erie Canal. In 1817 a Canal Fund led by Commissioners of the Canal Fund was established to oversee the funding of construction of the canal. In 1826 a Canal Board, of which both the planning commissioners and the Canal Fund commissioners were members, was created to take control of the operational canal. The term "Canal Commission" was at times applied to any of these bodies. Afterwards the canal commissioners were minor state cabinet officers responsible for the maintenance and improvements of the state's canals.

The office of Canal Commissioner was abolished in 1876, and their responsibilities were taken over by the Superintendent of Public Works in February 1878. The Canal Fund and the Canal Board were abolished in 1910.

== History ==
=== Origins of the Erie Canal Commission ===
As the United States expanded into western New York and the Northwest Territory, the Great Lakes became an essential part of the system of waterways, on which merchants did most of their shipping. The easiest way from the Great Lakes to the Atlantic Ocean and Europe was by way of the St. Lawrence River, but this was controlled mainly by the British from Canada. After examining the Mohawk River, a canal from the Great Lakes to the Hudson River was proposed. In addition to the control of shipping in North America, the United States would successfully tie the western territories to the eastern states, thus creating a more unified nation. This was an enormous undertaking, so it became necessary to appoint a Commission to oversee the entire project.

The origins of the Commission can be traced back to two men: Thomas Eddy and Jonas Platt. Eddy was the Treasurer of the Western Inland Lock Navigation Company, which had been established in 1792 with the purpose of developing a navigable route up the Mohawk River to Lake Ontario. When he found his company in financial trouble, he drew upon the idea first proposed by Joshua Forman (member of the New York State Assembly from Onondaga County in 1808) of building a canal, rather than trying to navigate the rivers. He turned to his friend Platt, then a State Senator and leader of the Federalists in New York, and the two of them decided to propose the creation of a small group of highly influential commissioners to explore two possible routes of a canal – one to Lake Ontario and one to Lake Erie. They would report findings to the New York State Legislature after their expedition to the west. In order to get permission for this commission, Platt and Eddy knew that each man had to command a certain amount of power and respect, but the whole group had to be politically balanced between Federalists and Democratic-Republicans. On March 13, 1810, Platt presented his project for a bipartisan Canal Commission to the State Legislature, and received overwhelming support. On March 15, the State Legislature appointed Federalists Gouverneur Morris, Stephen Van Rensselaer, William North and Thomas Eddy, and Democratic-Republicans DeWitt Clinton, Simeon DeWitt and Peter Buell Porter a commission to explore a route for a canal to Lake Erie, and report.

=== Surveying the route ===
In June 1810, the commissioners were prepared to head west to survey the land to determine a possible route for their canal. Though Gouverneur Morris was President of the Commission, the title was mainly ceremonial because all the members looked to DeWitt Clinton for leadership. All of the members except Van Rensselaer and Morris, who traversed the whole state by carriage, traveled up the Mohawk River and as far west as possible by water, where they met two amateur surveyors, James Geddes and Benjamin Wright. From there, they traveled the final one hundred miles from Lake Seneca to Lake Erie by carriage. DeWitt Clinton kept a journal for the entire journey, in which he closely documented their adventures.

After much deliberation, the Commission turned their findings into a report that they submitted in March 1811. Rejecting Porter's ideas of running the canal either to Lake Ontario, or through his lands to Lake Erie, the commissioners decided that the canal had to run straight to Lake Erie. Otherwise, the St. Lawrence River would still be a primary route of transportation and the West would not be connected to the East. They also rejected Morris's proposition of a natural waterway created by the overflow of Lake Erie in favor of an entirely artificial waterway. The final and most important section of the report demanded public financing and control of the canal by the State of New York. Citing past failures such as Eddy's company, and George Washington's Potomac Company, the Commission stated that such large endeavors were too expensive for private financing.

=== Response to the report ===
In response to this report, on April 8, 1811, the State Legislature passed the first of many laws relating to the canal. The bill added Robert Fulton and Robert R. Livingston to the Commission. Fulton had developed the first steamboat that ran along the Hudson River and Livingston was his business and engineering partner. It also gave the commissioners $15,000 to finance further activities and granted them permission to take all the necessary steps to finance the entire project. On June 19, 1812, the Commission was empowered to purchase the rights, interests and estate of the Western Inland Lock Navigation Company.

Eddy and Fulton looked for engineers to design the project. De Witt and Van Rensselaer sought land cessations for the path of the canal. Livingston, with the help of Clinton, devised a plan to secure national assistance. Morris and North looked for the best way to borrow money. The largest duty, however, was assigned to Clinton and Morris, who went to Washington, D.C., to solicit aid from President James Madison and the Federal Government. Unfortunately, after failing to obtain any funds from the government, their situation only got worse with the War of 1812.

=== War of 1812 and aftermath ===
With the outbreak of war, Van Rensselaer became the Head of the New York State Militia, and Clinton ran as the Federalists presidential candidate opposing James Madison and the war. In addition, despite allowing the Commission to create a fund for financing the canal in 1812, the State Legislature repealed the act in 1814, rendering the commissioners essentially helpless.

Finally, after the United States made peace with Great Britain, officials could turn their attention towards the canal, which they did in a public meeting in New York City on December 3, 1815. The board sparked interest by emphasizing the benefits the city would receive from the canal. Despite minor setbacks, the meeting was a huge success. Even though President Madison vetoed a bill that provided funding for one quarter of the canal, the Commission convinced the State Legislature to go ahead with construction.

=== New appointments to the commission ===
On April 17, 1816, the State Legislature passed a bill that provided more funds for the project, and appointed Van Rensselaer, Clinton, Joseph Ellicott, Myron Holley and Samuel Young Commissioners to Construct a Canal from the Hudson River to Lake Erie and Lake Champlain. Ellicott was well informed about the lands in western New York as well as being an agent of the Holland Land Company, which donated 100,000 acres (400 km^{2}) to the Erie Canal project. Holley, a State assemblyman, was a supporter of Clinton and government-financed public improvements. Young had written A Treatise on Internal Navigation - A Comprehensive Study of Canals in Great Britain and Holland.

The project was soon caught up in politics, with either party attempting to receive the credit for the construction; the Bucktails struggled to gain control over the Commission, still firmly held by Clinton in 1817.

On April 19, 1817, the State Legislature created the Canal Fund to oversee construction. The Commissioners of the Canal Fund consisted ex officio of the Lieutenant Governor, the State Comptroller, the Attorney General, the Secretary of State, the State Treasurer and the Surveyor General. The existing Canal Commission was keep a separate planning body, thereby splitting Clinton's power over the canal.

In 1818, Ellicot resigned from the Commission citing poor health, and to replace him, Clinton appointed one of his strongest supporters Ephraim Hart. Recognizing Hart’s political allegiance, the Bucktail majority of the State Legislature elected a Clinton opponent, Henry Seymour, in 1819 to succeed Hart.

The Commission slipped even further out of Clinton’s control in 1821, when the Bucktail-controlled State Legislature passed a bill that provided two million dollars in funding for the canal, as well as the appointment of an additional commissioner. As Governor of New York, Clinton had to sign the bill so he was not seen as blocking the necessary funds. The Bucktails promptly elected William C. Bouck, another staunch Clinton opponent.

A heavy blow to Clinton came on April 12, 1824, when his opponents succeeded in ousting him from the Commission. Despite words of support in the State Assembly, they voted him out and Clinton stepped down after being a commissioner from the beginning and its president since 1816. A wave of indignation over the treatment of the man who was recognized as the driving force behind the construction, Clinton was re-elected Governor of New York in November 1824, and had the great satisfaction to preside over the inauguration of the completed Erie Canal on October 26, 1825.

=== Later reorganization and operations ===
The New York State Constitution of 1821 provided for the creation of the Canal Board to oversee the operational canal, which was established in 1826. The Board originally consisted of the same officers as the Commissioners of the Canal Fund, as well as the members of the Canal Commission, thereby merging he two in practical terms. In 1846, the newly created office of State Engineer and Surveyor replaced the Surveyor General.

Until 1844 the term of the commissioners was indefinite. The Act of May 6, 1844, established a four-year term, while vacancies were filled by concurrent resolution of both houses of the State Legislature, or during the recess of the Legislature, temporarily by the Governor, and a substitute was elected at the next State election if there was a remainder of the term. The Constitution of 1846 shortened the term to three years.

The office of Canal Commissioner was abolished by an amendment in 1876, with the functions of the office taken over by the new Commissioner of Public Works.

In 1903 New York State legislature authorized construction of the "New York State Barge Canal" as the "improvement of the Erie, the Oswego, the Champlain and the Cayuga and Seneca Canals". In 1905, construction of the Barge Canal began; it was completed in 1918, at a cost of $96.7 million. Now known as the New York State Canal System, it is operated by the New York State Canal Corporation.

== List of Canal Commissioners ==
Name	Took office	Left office	Party	Notes
Gouverneur Morris	March 15, 1810	April 17, 1816	Federalist	
William North	March 15, 1810	April 17, 1816	Federalist	
Simeon De Witt	March 15, 1810	April 17, 1816	Dem.-Rep.	
Thomas Eddy	March 15, 1810	April 17, 1816	Federalist	
Peter Buell Porter	March 15, 1810	April 17, 1816	Dem.-Rep.	
DeWitt Clinton	March 15, 1810	April 12, 1824	Dem.-Rep.	Removed by State Legislature
Stephen Van Rensselaer	March 15, 1810	January 26, 1839	Federalist/Clintonian	Became a Clintonian when the Federalist Party disbanded; died in office; longest-serving Canal Commissioner (almost 29 years)
Robert R. Livingston	April 8, 1811	February 26, 1813	Dem.-Rep.	Died in office
Robert Fulton	April 8, 1811	February 24, 1815	Dem.-Rep.	Died in office
Charles D. Cooper	1815	April 17, 1816	Dem.-Rep.	
Joseph Ellicott	April 17, 1816	1818		Resigned
Myron Holley	April 17, 1816	March 30, 1824	Dem.-Rep./Clintonian	resigned
Samuel Young	April 17, 1816	February 22, 1840	Dem.-Rep./Bucktails	
Ephraim Hart	June 18, 1818	March 24, 1819	Dem.-Rep./Clintonian	Appointed by the Governor in place of Ellicott until the election of a successor by the State Legislature
Henry Seymour	March 24, 1819	May 1831	Dem.-Rep./Bucktails	Succeeding Hart, elected by the State Legislature in place of Ellicott; then resigned
William C. Bouck	March 21, 1821	February 22, 1840	Dem.-Rep./Bucktails/Dem.	
Jonas Earll, Jr.	May 1831	February 22, 1840	Democratic	Appointed by the Governor in place of Seymour, then elected by the State Legislature on January 9, 1832, to succeed himself
Michael Hoffman	April 4, 1833	May 6, 1835	Democratic	Resigned
Heman Judd Redfield	May 9, 1835		Democratic	Elected by the State Legislature in place of Hoffman, but declined to take office
John Bowman	May 1835	February 22, 1840	Democratic	Appointed by the Governor in place of Redfield, then elected by the State Legislature on January 9, 1836 to succeed himself
William Baker	May 25, 1836	February 22, 1840	Democratic	
Samuel B. Ruggles	February 18, 1839	February 8, 1842	Whig	Elected by the State Legislature in place of Van Rensselaer
David Hudson	February 22, 1840	February 8, 1842	Whig	
Simon Newton Dexter	February 22, 1840	February 8, 1842	Whig	
Henry Hamilton	February 22, 1840	February 8, 1842	Whig	
George H. Boughton	February 22, 1840	February 8, 1842	Whig	
Asa Whitney	February 22, 1840	February 8, 1842	Whig	
Stephen Clark	February 8, 1842	May 6, 1844	Democratic	Legislated out of office by Act of May 6, 1844
James Hooker	February 8, 1842	May 6, 1844	Democratic	legislated out of office by Act of May 6, 1844
Benjamin Enos	February 8, 1842	February 3, 1845	Democratic	Legislated out of office by Act of May 6, 1844
George W. Little	February 8, 1842	February 3, 1845	Democratic	Legislated out of office by Act of May 6, 1844
Jonas Earll, Jr.	February 8, 1842	October 28, 1846	Democratic	Second term; legislated out of office by Act of May 6, 1844, re-elected to a two-year term; died in office
Daniel P. Bissell	February 8, 1842	December 31, 1847	Democratic	Legislated out of office by Act of May 6, 1844, then re-elected to a four-year term, then legislated out of office by the Constitution of 1846
Nathaniel Jones	February 3, 1845	November 1, 1847	Democratic	Elected in November 1844 to a two-year term; the Constitution of 1846 extended his term until December 31, 1847; then resigned
Stephen Clark	February 3, 1845	December 31, 1847	Democratic	Second term; elected in November 1844 to a four-year term; legislated out of office by the Constitution of 1846
John T. Hudson	December 3, 1846	December 31, 1847	Democratic	Appointed by the Governor in place of Earll to fill the vacancy
Thomas Clowes	November 15, 1847	December 31, 1847	Whig	Elected by the State Legislature in place of Jones to fill the vacancy
Nelson J. Beach	January 1, 1848	December 31, 1849	Whig/Anti-Rent	Elected in November 1847, drew the two-year term
Jacob Hinds	January 1, 1848	December 31, 1850	Whig/Anti-Rent	Elected in November 1847, drew the three-year term
Charles Cook	January 1, 1848	December 31, 1851	Whig	Elected in November 1847, drew the one-year term; then re-elected to a full term
Frederick Follett	January 1, 1850	December 31, 1855	Democratic	two terms
John C. Mather	January 1, 1851	December 31, 1853	Democratic	Impeached by the State Assembly in 1853, acquitted by the New York Court for the Trial of Impeachments
Henry Fitzhugh	January 1, 1852	December 31, 1857	Whig	Two terms
Cornelius Gardinier	January 1, 1854	December 31, 1856	Whig	
Samuel S. Whallon	January 1, 1856	July 6, 1858	American	Died in office
Charles H. Sherrill	January 1, 1857	December 31, 1859	Republican	
John M. Jaycox	January 1, 1858	December 31, 1860	Democratic	
Samuel B. Ruggles	July 1858	December 31, 1858	Republican	appointed by the Governor in place of Whallon to fill vacancy
Hiram Gardner	January 1, 1859	December 31, 1861	Republican	
William I. Skinner	January 1, 1860	December 31, 1865	Democratic	Two terms
Benjamin F. Bruce	January 16, 1861	December 31, 1861	Republican	elected by the State Legislature to fill vacancy caused by the death of Samuel H. Barnes who had been elected on November 6, 1860, but died on November 13
William W. Wright	January 1, 1862	December 31, 1863	Democratic	Succeeding Bruce, elected for the remainder of Barnes's term
Franklin A. Alberger	January 1, 1862	December 31, 1867	Union	Two terms
Benjamin F. Bruce	January 1, 1864	December 31, 1866	Union	Second term
Robert C. Dorn	January 1, 1866	December 31, 1868	Republican	impeached by the State Assembly in 1868, acquitted by the New York Court for the Trial of Impeachments
Stephen T. Hayt	January 1, 1867	December 31, 1869	Republican	
John D. Fay	January 1, 1868	December 31, 1873	Democratic	Two terms
Oliver Bascom	January 1, 1869	November 7, 1869	Democratic	died in office
George W. Chapman	November 12, 1869	December 31, 1871	Democratic	Appointed by the Governor in place of Bascom to fill vacancy, then elected for the remainder of Bascom's term
William W. Wright	January 1, 1870	December 31, 1872	Democratic	Second term
Alexander Barkley	January 1, 1872	December 31, 1874	Republican	
Reuben W. Stroud	January 1, 1873	December 2, 1875	Republican	died in office; son-in-law of Benjamin F. Bruce
James Jackson, Jr.	January 1, 1874	December 31, 1876	Democratic	
Adin Thayer	January 1, 1875	December 31, 1877	Democratic	No successor was elected at the previous State Election, but Thayer's term was deemed to have expired, and he was not holding over until the appointment of a Superintendent of Public Works.
Christopher A. Walrath	December 1875	February 8, 1878	Democratic	appointed by the Governor in place of Stroud to fill the vacancy, then took office for his elected term, then legislated out of office, office abolished and responsibilities taken over by Superintendent of Public Works
Darius A. Ogden	January 1, 1877	February 8, 1878	Democratic	Legislated out of office, office abolished and responsibilities taken over by Superintendent of Public Works
