= Constitution of New York =

American state constitution

Constitution of the State of New York

Overview
- Jurisdiction: State of New York
- Subordinate to: Supreme law of the United States

Full text
- New York Constitution at Wikisource

The Constitution of the State of New York establishes the structure of the government of the state of New York, and enumerates the basic rights of the citizens of New York. Like most state constitutions in the United States, New York's constitution's provisions tend to be more detailed and amended more often than its federal counterpart. Because the history of the state constitution differs from the federal constitution, the New York Court of Appeals has seen fit to interpret analogous provisions differently from United States Supreme Court's interpretation of federal provisions.

== Constitutional conventions ==
The State of New York has held nine Constitutional conventions: in 1776–1777, 1801, 1821, 1846, 1867–1868, 1894, 1915, 1938, and 1967; a Constitutional Commission in 1872–1873; and a Judicial Convention in 1921. Despite this, the state has had only four essentially de novo constitutions in its history, those of 1777 (replacing the former colonial charter), 1821, 1846, and 1894.

During the 20th century, the State held three constitutional conventions, the efforts of two of which were rejected by the New York State electorate. However, portions of the seventh Convention's proposals of 1915, were adopted separately later in 1925 and 1927. The eighth Constitutional Convention of 1938, unlike all other state constitutional conventions since 1801, did not actually propose an entirely new Constitution, but just substantially modified the 1894 Constitution, from the sixth Convention, which was (and is) still in force.

== Current Constitution ==
New York's constitution consists of a preamble and 20 articles. It was last amended on January 1, 2025.

=== Preamble ===
We The People of the State of New York, grateful to Almighty God for our Freedom, in order to secure its blessings, DO ESTABLISH THIS CONSTITUTION.

=== Article I: Bill of Rights ===
This article establishes the rights and personal freedoms of the people, as well as the responsibilities and limitations of the government. Many of the provisions in this article are similar to those in the Constitution of the United States. Some provisions included are freedom of speech, a trial by jury, freedom of worship, habeas corpus, and security against unreasonable search and seizures. This article also permits the use of eminent domain, collective bargaining, the New York State Lottery, parimutuel betting on horse racing, and up to seven commercial casinos. A 2021 amendment noted that residents of the state are entitled to "clean air and water, and a healthful environment."

=== Article II: Suffrage ===
This article describes the rights and requirements involved in voting. All citizens over eighteen are allowed to vote if they have been a resident at least 30 days before the date of an election. Any form of bribery or compensation to compel the giving or withholding of a vote is not allowed. The article also establishes the general operation of absentee ballots, voter registration, elections and provides for bi-partisan election boards.

=== Article III: Legislature ===
This article establishes the powers and limitations of the bicameral New York State Legislature, which consists of a Senate containing 50 members initially, and an Assembly containing 150 members. Except for Senators elected in 1895 who served three-year terms, every legislative member is elected to two-year terms. The current number of Senators is set by State Law §123, and the number of Senate districts is set at 63 by State Law §124; currently, there are 63 Senate seats. The legislative process, such as the passage of bills, is also described in this article.

The article includes rules and processes for drawing legislative districts and making apportionments. The United States Census is used to determine the number of inhabitants; if it is not carried out or fails to provide this information, then the state Legislature has the power to enumerate its inhabitants. Whenever districts must be amended, an "independent redistricting commission" composed of ten members (two appointed by the temporary president of the Senate, two appointed by the Speaker of the Assembly, two appointed by the Senate Minority Leader, two appointed by the Assembly Minority Leader, and two appointed by the eight other appointed members) is created. Drawing of district lines must not violate racial or language minority voting rights. Each district must contain "as nearly as may be an equal number of inhabitants"; if it does not the commission must provide a reason. Additionally, districts must consist of a contiguous territory and be "as compact in form as practicable".

Emergency powers are described in Section 25. The legislature is granted the power to enact measures allowing the continuity of government, and "provide for prompt and temporary succession" of public offices if they were to become unavailable in the event of an emergency caused by "enemy attack or by disasters (natural or otherwise)". The final paragraph states: "Nothing in this article shall be construed to limit in any way the power of the state to deal with emergencies arising from any cause".

This article also abolishes prison labor contracts and notes that no one can be a state or local legislature while also holding any civil or military position without having to vacate their seats.

=== Article IV: Executive ===
This article states that executive branch powers are vested in the governor and lieutenant governor, who are elected jointly to serve four-year terms. The governor can veto legislative bills, is the commander-in-chief of the state's military, can convene the legislature "on extraordinary occasions", and has the power to grant pardons for all offenses except treason and impeachment. The order of succession has the lieutenant governor first in line, and then the temporary president of the Senate.

=== Article V: Officers and Civil Departments ===
Article V describes the roles of the comptroller and attorney-general as well as the operation of the civil departments, of which there can be at most 20. This article also gives veterans an advantage in hiring and promotions for state officer positions, especially if they have been disabled due to service. In addition, this article protects public employee pension benefits from being diminished or impaired.

=== Article VI: Judiciary ===
Article VI describes the judicial branch, including the court systems, the operation of trials, and the conditions for appointing and removing judges and justices. It contains 37 sections, more than any other article. It describes the Court of Appeals, the Supreme Court and its Appellate Division as well as lesser courts. It also lays out special rules for the courts of New York City and the procedure by which the governor designates justices.

This article also provides for trial by jury, which is composed of six or of twelve persons depending on the circumstances.

=== Article VII: State Finances ===
This article describes a number of items related to state finances. It requires the heads of each department to prepare and have estimates for budgets presented to the governor by December 1 of each year. Department heads may also be required to attend hearings called by the governor as budget estimates are reviewed. The governor then submits their budget including any proposed bills for expenditures.

The state may lend money to lending institutions for loans to purchase manufacturing property but only up to 80% of the value. The state can not take on debt unless they can expect that amount to be paid back through taxes or new and existing bonds will provide funding for the year for that appropriation bill. However, the state can take on debt in the case of insurrection, invasion, or forest fire.

=== Article VIII: Local Finances ===
Counties, cities, towns, and villages can make provisions of aid for the care, support, maintenance, education, and health and welfare services for children, inmates, retired fire or police department workers, and widows of the fire department and police. It also provides for other rules for how counties, cities, towns, and villages can use money, and how they should pay their debts.

=== Article XI: Education ===
In this article, money is provided for the common schools and notes that all children have the right to be educated. In addition, it establishes the New York State Board of Regents and the University of the State of New York. It also prohibits the spending money on religious schools except for transportation.

=== Article XV: Canals ===
The legislature cannot sell, abandon or otherwise dispose of the barge canal system. However, if any canal lands are no longer useful for navigation, the legislature can authorize their sale or disposal. These assets must remain property of the state forever under state management.

Revocable permits and leases can be granted for the use of canal properties. In addition, the state can lease or transfer the entire canal system to the federal government for integration into the national system of inland waterways. This transfer can occur with or without compensation to New York State. If transferred the state can still fund canal operations for benefits like flood control and water management

The legislature must fund maintenance and improvements of the canals. Any revenue from canal lands or usage must go into a special revenue fund which can only be used for canal related projects.

=== Article XX: When to Take Effect ===
Article XX describes the day that the constitution will take effect, which is January 1, 1939.

== Constitution of New York, 1777 ==
The Fourth New York Provincial Congress, resolving itself as the Convention of Representatives of the State of New York, adopted the first constitution of the state of New York on April 20, 1777.

The Province of New York was established after the naval invasion and absorption of the previous Dutch Colony of New Netherlands. The original proprietor was the Duke of York, the future James II of England and James VII of Scotland and younger brother of the then-King of England, Charles II. Its Colonial Charter was under authority from the Monarch, (the King or Queen of Great Britain) of the Kingdom of England and later of Great Britain, after the Act of Union of 1707 which united England and Wales and the formerly independent kingdom of Scotland

The First Constitution of 1777, which replaced this Colonial Charter with its royal authority, for the newly independent "State of New York" was framed by a Convention which assembled at White Plains, New York, (just north of New York City) on Sunday evening, July 10, 1776. The city was then threatened with a British occupation by an invading British Army landing on Staten Island. There were repeated adjournments and changes of location, caused by the increasingly desperate war situation, with General George Washington's ragged Continental Army, forced out of New York City by crushing defeats in the New York and New Jersey campaign. The British went on to completely occupy 5 counties in the state, along with New York City itself from 1776 until 1783.

The work of creating a democratic and free independent state continued by the Convention through the bitter winter with the British quartered in the City of New York and Washington's few thousand troops camped in winter quarters to the southwest in Morristown, New Jersey. The first Constitutional Convention in New York's history terminated its labors at Kingston, New York, on Sunday evening, April 20, 1777, when the new Constitution was adopted with but one dissenting vote, and then adjourned. The site is now Senate House State Historic Site. The constitution was not submitted to the people for ratification, however because of the war situation. It was drafted by John Jay, Robert R. Livingston, (new Chancellor of the State of New York), and Gouverneur Morris, who would subsequently help write the U.S. Constitution.

This Constitution was a combination document, containing its own "Declaration of Independence" from Great Britain, and its Constitutional Law. It called for a weak bicameral legislature (Assembly and State Senate) and a strong executive branch with a governor. It retained provisions from the Colonial Charter such as the substantial property qualification for voting and the ability of the Governor to prorogue (dismiss) the Legislature. This imbalance of power between the branches of state government kept the elite firmly in control, and disenfranchised the majority of the male New York population. Slavery was legal in New York until 1827.

Under this Constitution, the lower chamber Assembly had a provision for a maximum of 70 Members, with the following apportionment:

1. For the City and County of New York (that is, Manhattan Island), nine.
2. The City and County of Albany (Now Albany, Columbia, Rensselaer, Saratoga, Greene, Schoharie, and Schenectady Counties), ten
3. Dutchess County (now Dutchess and Putnam counties), seven.
4. Westchester County (now Bronx and Westchester counties), six.
5. Ulster County, (now Ulster and Sullivan Counties, and the northern part of Orange County) six.
6. Suffolk County, five.
7. Queens County (now Queens and Nassau Counties), four.
8. Orange County (now the southern part of Orange County, as well as Rockland County), four.
9. Kings County, two.
10. Richmond County, two.
11. Tryon County (now Montgomery County; included all of New York State to the west, to Lake Ontario and Lake Erie).
12. Charlotte County (now Washington County; included the present Clinton, Essex, Franklin, and St. Lawrence counties), four.
13. Cumberland County (seceded January 15, 1777, to the Vermont Republic), three.
14. Gloucester County (seceded January 15, 1777, to the Vermont Republic), two.

This apportionment stood unchanged until seven years after the end of the Revolutionary War, in 1790, when the First United States Census was held to correct apportionments.

On the subject of enfranchisement, Article VII of the new constitution said:

VII. That every male inhabitant of full age, who shall have personally resided within one of the counties of this State for six months immediately preceding the day of election, shall, at such election, entitled to vote for representatives of the said county in assembly; if, during the time aforesaid, he shall have been a freeholder, possessing a freehold of the value of twenty pounds, within the said county, or have rented a tenement therein of the yearly value of forty shillings, and been rated and actually paid taxes to this State: Provided always, That every person who now is a freeman of the city of Albany, or who was made a freeman of the city of New York on or before the fourteenth day of October, in the year of our Lord one thousand seven hundred and seventy-five, and shall be actually and usually resident in the said cities, respectively, shall be entitled to vote for representatives in assembly within his said place of residence.

== Constitutional Convention of 1801 ==
The Constitutional Convention of 1801 was not convened to propose a new Constitution. Instead, it formed purely to resolve differences of interpretation of §23 of the 1777 Constitution, which provided for a Council of Appointment. Governor John Jay sent a special message to the lower chamber (New York State Assembly) on February 26, 1801, and the same message to the upper chamber (New York State Senate) on the following day, in relation to the Council of Appointment, reciting the differences which had existed between Council and Governor, not only during his own term, but during the term of his predecessor, Governor George Clinton. Governor Jay claimed that under the Constitution the Governor had the exclusive right of nomination, but some members of the Council of Appointment claimed a concurrent right of nomination. This, the Governor denied, and in this message he recommends that it be settled in some way.

Since the original Constitution had no provisions as to how to amend it, on April 6, 1801, the legislature passed a law with the title "An Act Recommending a Convention" for the purpose of considering the question of the interpretation of §23 of the Constitution, and also that part of the Constitution relating to the number of members of both Senate and Assembly. The Senate was originally composed of twenty-four members, and the Assembly of seventy members, and provision was made for an increase in each chamber at stated periods, until the maximum should be reached, which was fixed at one hundred senators and three hundred members of assembly. The increase in membership had apparently been more rapid than was at first anticipated. At that time the Senate had increased to forty-three members, and the Assembly to one hundred and twenty-six members.

The election of the delegates took place in August; the Convention met on the second Tuesday in October at Albany. It ended two weeks later on October 27, 1801.

Among the delegates were DeWitt Clinton (future governor), James Clinton, William Floyd, Ezra L'Hommedieu, Smith Thompson, Daniel D. Tompkins, John Vernon Henry, William P. Van Ness, and Vice President of the United States Aaron Burr, who presided. Tompkins was one of the 14 who voted against the right of nomination being given to the members of the Council of Appointments and the Governor concurrently, a minority which was defeated by 86 votes for this compromise. Previously, both motions, to vest the right of nomination either exclusively in the governor or exclusively in the Council members, were defeated.

The changes in this version of the Constitution were:

- The number of senators was permanently fixed at 32.
- The assembly was given 100 members, and provision was made for a possible increase to 150, by additions to be made after each census.
- The right of nomination, formerly vested in the governor only (as John Jay, the original author/contributor of the 1777 Constitution, meant it), was given now to each member of the Council of Appointment and the Governor concurrently.

== New York State Constitutional Conventions ==
=== Constitutional Convention of 1821 ===
In 1821, the power struggle between Governor DeWitt Clinton and the Bucktails faction of the Democratic-Republican Party led to the call for a Constitutional Convention by the Bucktail members of the legislature, against Clinton's fierce opposition. Their intention was to transfer powers from the executive to the legislative branch of the government. In November 1820, the legislature passed a bill which authorized the holding of a convention with unlimited powers. Governor Clinton cast the deciding vote in the Council of Revision to veto the bill. The Bucktails did not have a two-thirds majority in the legislature to override the veto. During the regular session (beginning in January 1821), the Legislature passed a new bill that put the question to the people. At the state election in April 1821, the people voted in favor of the convention.

The convention met from August to November in Albany. U.S. Vice President Daniel D. Tompkins presided. Between January 15 and 17, 1822, the new constitution, as amended by the convention, was put before the voters for ratification as a whole, and was accepted: for 74,732; against 41,402.

There was deep division among New Yorkers over the merits of the amended constitution. Those who opposed it and who did not sign included:

- Vice President Daniel D. Tompkins
- Ambrose Spencer, Chief Justice of New York
- James Kent, Chancellor of the New York Court of Chancery
- William W. Van Ness, Justice of the New York Supreme Court
- Jacob R. Van Rensselaer
- Stephen Van Rensselaer
- James Tallmadge Jr.
- Jonas Platt
- Peter A. Jay

Supporters who signed the new constitution included:

- Martin Van Buren, future Vice President and President
- Erastus Root
- Samuel Nelson
- Nathan Sanford
- Samuel Young
- Ogden Edwards

Peter R. Livingston, Alexander Sheldon, Jacob Radcliff, Peter Sharpe, Rufus King, and Nathaniel Pitcher were also among the delegates.

The changes in this version of the constitution were:

- State elections were moved from the last week in April to the first week in November. Beginning in 1823, the terms of the governor (two-year term), lieutenant governor (two-year term), state senators (four-year term) and assemblymen (one-year term) coincided with the calendar year.
- The lieutenant governor was to succeed to the governor's office "for the residue of the term" whenever a vacancy occurred, unlike John Tayler, who in 1817 became "Acting Governor" only until the election of a successor.
- The Council of Appointment was abolished and the vast majority of formerly appointive offices were made elective. State officeholders were elected by joint ballot of the Assembly and State Senate; others by local popular or legislative elections.
- The Council of Revision was abolished. Its power to veto new legislation was transferred to the governor, whose veto could be overcome by a two-thirds vote of the legislature.
- The Governor's right to prorogue (dismiss) the legislature at will was abolished.
- Property qualifications for white men to vote were removed.
- Black men were granted the vote, but with a property qualification which effectively disfranchised nearly all of them. It was at this time that Peter Augustus Jay, one of the delegates and also the son of John Jay gave an impassioned speech at the Convention arguing that the right to vote should be extended to free African Americans. "Peter Augustus Jay, one of a minority of advocates of universal manhood suffrage, insisted that the idea that black people were naturally inferior had long been 'completely refuted and universally exploded.'"
- A Canal Board was to be formed by the Commissioners of the Canal Fund (the State Cabinet officers) and the Canal Commissioners
- Eight Circuit Courts were created, one in each senatorial district. Until then, the justices of the New York State Supreme Court had held traveling circuit court.

=== Constitutional Convention of 1846 ===
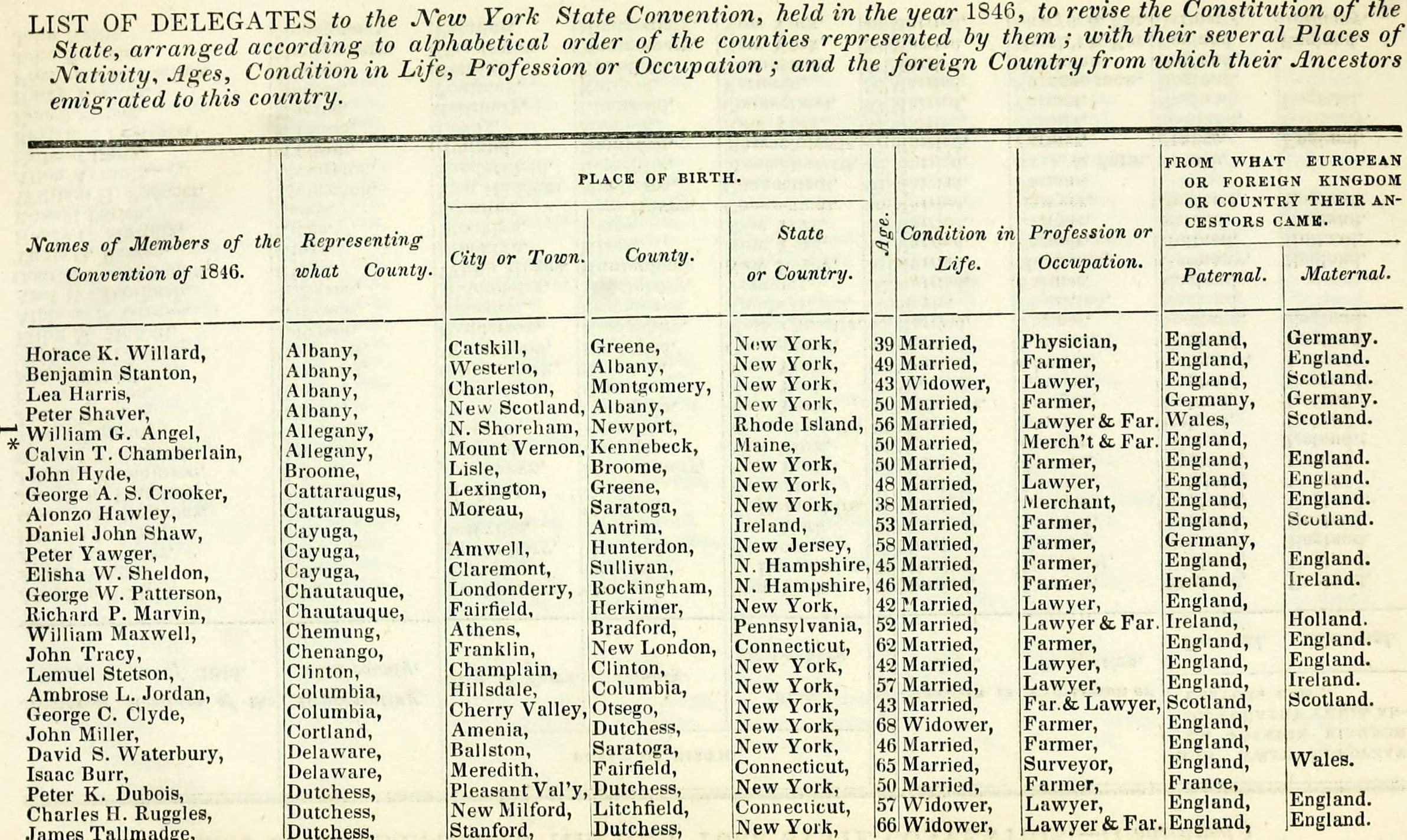
Manual for the use of the Convention, first page of list of delegates

The delegates convened at Albany on June 1, 1846, and adjourned on October 9. The new Constitution was put before the voters at the next state election in November and was adopted. Yes: 221,528 votes, No: 92,436 votes.

John Tracy presided. Ira Harris, George W. Patterson, Ambrose L. Jordan, Charles H. Ruggles, David R. Floyd-Jones, Charles O'Conor, Samuel J. Tilden (future New York Governor and 1876 presidential candidate who won popular vote but lost in electoral college to Rutherford B. Hayes), Levi S. Chatfield, William B. Wright, Michael Hoffman and William C. Bouck were among the delegates.

The changes in this version of the constitution were:

- Provisions for tenants' rights were added, abolishing feudal tenures and outlawing leases lasting longer than twelve years (See Article I, Sections 12 and 14). These constitutional changes took place in response to the Anti-Rent War.
- The Court of Chancery and the Court for the Correction of Errors were abolished. Jurisdiction on equity was transferred to the New York Supreme Court, jurisdiction on appeal to the New York Court of Appeals.
- The New York State Circuit Courts were abolished, and replaced by the district benches of the New York Supreme Court.
- The New York Court of Appeals was established in July 1847, consisting of four statewide elected judges and four justices chosen annually from the New York Supreme Court.
- The state cabinet officers (Attorney General, Secretary of State, Comptroller, Treasurer and State Engineer) who had been chosen by joint ballot of the Legislature, were now elected by the voters at the state elections in odd years. The incumbents were legislated out of office on December 31, 1847. The successors were elected at the state election in November and took office on January 1, 1848. From 1848 on, the state officers served a two-year term, one year in the second half of the term of the incumbent Governor, the other year in the first half of the term of the succeeding Governor.

=== Constitutional Convention of 1867–1868 ===
According to the Constitution of 1846, twenty years after its elaboration the electorate was asked if they wanted a constitutional convention to be held, which was answered in the affirmative at the New York state election, 1866 with 352,854 votes for, and 256,364 against the convention. On April 23, 1867, the delegates were elected, and the convention had a small Republican majority. The convention met in June at Albany, New York, adjourned on September 23, met again on November 12, and adjourned again in February 1868. Afterwards the draft was discussed in the New York State Legislature for another year and a half, the questions being if to vote for the whole Constitution or separately for some or all articles. In the end, the new Constitution was rejected by the voters at the New York state election, 1869, with 223,935 votes for and 290,456 against it. The Republican Party advocated the adoption, the Democrats the rejection of the new proposed Constitution of 1867-68, and by 1869 the Democrats had a majority in the State. Only the "Judicial Article" which re-organized the New York Court of Appeals was adopted by a small majority, with 247,240 for and 240,442 against it.

William A. Wheeler presided. Waldo Hutchins, William M. Evarts, George Opdyke, Augustine J. H. Duganne, George William Curtis, Horace Greeley, Ira Harris, Martin I. Townsend, Charles Andrews, Tracy Beadle, Charles J. Folger, Erastus S. Prosser, Augustus Frank, Augustus Schell, George Law, Henry C. Murphy, Homer A. Nelson, David L. Seymour, Jacob Hardenbergh, Smith M. Weed, Alonzo C. Paige, Francis Kernan, George F. Comstock, John Magee, Sanford E. Church, Joseph G. Masten, Marshall B. Champlain, Selah B. Strong, Erastus Brooks, Teunis G. Bergen, William D. Veeder, John G. Schumaker, Stephen J. Colahan, Charles P. Daly, Samuel B. Garvin, Abraham R. Lawrence Jr., Elbridge T. Gerry, Frederick W. Loew, Gideon J. Tucker, Samuel J. Tilden, Edwards Pierrepont, James Brooks, John E. Develin, William Hitchman, Abraham B. Conger, Abraham B. Tappen, William H. Morris, B. Platt Carpenter, John Stanton Gould, John M. Francis, Adolphus F. Hitchcock, Erastus Corning, Amasa J. Parker, Marius Schoonmaker, Matthew Hale, Edwin A. Merritt, Leslie W. Russell, James A. Bell, Richard U. Sherman, Theodore W. Dwight, Benjamin N. Huntington, Ezra Graves, Elias Root, M. Lindley Lee, Thomas G. Alvord, Frank Hiscock, Horatio Ballard, Elizur H. Prindle, Samuel F. Miller, Hobart Krum, Charles E. Parker, Milo Goodrich, George O. Rathbun, Elbridge G. Lapham, David Rumsey, Jerome Fuller, Freeman Clarke, Seth Wakeman, Thomas T. Flagler, Israel T. Hatch, George W. Clinton, Augustus F. Allen, and Norman M. Allen were among the delegates.

The changes in this version of the constitution were:

- The New York Court of Appeals was totally re-organized. Instead of eight Judges, four elected statewide and four selected from the New York Supreme Court, it had now one Chief Judge of the New York Court of Appeals and six Associate Judges, all elected statewide.
- The Clerk of the New York Court of Appeals was not elected statewide anymore.
- The term of office of the Judges of the Court of Appeals and the Justices of the New York Supreme Court was extended from 8 to 14 years, and the rotative renewal (every two years one Judge or Justice had been elected to an eight-year term; in case of a vacancy, a special election was held to fill the remainder of the term only) was abolished. Instead, vacancies were filled as they occurred (by death, resignation, or term expiration), always to a full 14-year term.

=== Constitutional Commission of 1872–1873 ===
After the rejection of all amendments proposed by the Convention of 1867–68, except the judicial article, Governor John T. Hoffman suggested to the Legislature that a non-partisan Constitutional Commission of 32 members should be formed. The Commission had four members from each senatorial district, appointed by the Governor, and confirmed by the State Senate, equally divided between the two major political parties. The Commission met from December 4, 1872, to March 15, 1873. They proposed amendments to the Constitution of 1846, which was still in force with amendments which were then approved or rejected by the Legislature, and those approved were then submitted to the voters for ratification.

Among the members were: Robert H. Pruyn who presided; George Opdyke, Augustus Schell, John D. Van Buren, Erastus Brooks, Benjamin D. Silliman, George C. Burdett, Francis Kernan, Elias W. Leavenworth, Daniel Pratt, John F. Hubbard Jr., Barna R. Johnson, Lucius Robinson, George B. Bradley, Van Rensselaer Richmond, Lysander Farrar, Lorenzo Morris and Sherman S. Rogers.

Major changes:

- The terms of the Governor and lieutenant Governor was increased from two to three years.
- The statewide elective offices of three Inspectors of State Prisons and three Canal Commissioners were abolished, and were succeeded by a Superintendent of State Prisons and a Superintendent of Public Works, appointed by the governor, and confirmed by the State Senate.

=== Constitutional Convention of 1894 ===
On January 27, 1893, the Legislature passed "An Act to amend chapter 398, of the Laws of 1892, entitled 'An Act to provide for a convention to revise and amend the Constitution'", calling a Constitutional Convention to meet in 1894. The 175 delegates were elected at the New York state election, 1893, five in each senatorial district, and 15 at-large. The Convention met on May 8, 1894, at the New York State Capitol in Albany; and adjourned on September 29. The revised Constitution was submitted for ratification at the New York state election, 1894, in three parts: the new legislative apportionment; the proposed canal improvements; and 31 miscellaneous amendments to the Constitution; which were all adopted by the voters.

Among the delegates were: Joseph H. Choate, President; Thomas G. Alvord, First Vice President; William H. Steele, Second Vice President; Elihu Root; Edward Lauterbach; Jesse Johnson; Frederick William Holls; Michael H. Hirschberg; John T. McDonough; John M. Francis; Commodore P. Vedder; John I. Gilbert; Augustus Frank; Daniel H. McMillan; Frederic Storm; John G. Schumaker; John B. Meyenborg; Almet F. Jenks; Charles B. Morton; William D. Veeder; John Cooney; Thomas W. Fitzgerald; Wright Holcomb, De Lancey Nicoll; John Bigelow; Frank T. Fitzgerald; Leonard A. Giegerich; Joseph Koch; Gideon J. Tucker; M. Warley Platzek; Jacob Marks; Andrew H. Green; Joseph I. Green; Stephen S. Blake; William Church Osborn; Willard H. Mase; Roswell A. Parmenter; A. Bleecker Banks; Abram B. Steele; Chester B. McLaughlin; Elon R. Brown; Henry J. Cookinham; John C. Davies; Louis Marshall; Milo M. Acker; Merton E. Lewis; I. Sam Johnson; Henry W. Hill; George Allen Davis; and Charles J. Kurth.

Major changes:

- The term of the governor and lieutenant governor was shortened from three to two years.
- The election of state officers (Secretary of State, Comptroller, Attorney General; Treasurer; State Engineer) and state senators was moved from odd-numbered years to even-numbered years, henceforth coinciding with the gubernatorial election.
- The number of state senators was increased from 32 to 50; and the number of assemblymen from 128 to 150. Legislative voting districts were allocated among counties based on citizen population, not total population, so as to exclude the flow of immigrants through Ellis Island. A complex allocation formula was used to ensure that upstate areas would receive senate and assembly districts far in excess of their share of the overall population. Before the Supreme Court's influential one person, one vote decisions of the 1960s, the Republican Party would control the state assembly for sixty-six years and the state senate for fifty-seven.
- The State Forest Preserve was given perpetual protection as wild land.
- The State-owned Onondaga Salt Springs Reservation was allowed to be sold.
- Convict labor in penal institutions was abolished.
- The use of voting machines was allowed.
- The first meeting of the annual legislative session was moved from the first Tuesday to the first Wednesday in January.

=== Constitutional Convention of 1915 ===
Under the 1894 Constitution, the people were to vote on the holding of a seventh Constitutional Convention in 1916. However, the Governor proposed that the Convention be moved up to 1915 so that it would not be overshadowed by other issues. Thus, in April 1914, a referendum approved a Constitutional Convention to be held in 1915. There were 168 delegates to the 1915 Convention. The delegates included: Elihu Root (the President of the Convention), Edgar T. Brackett, Jacob Brenner, Alphonso T. Clearwater, Patrick W. Cullinan, Seth Low, Louis Marshall, John Lord O'Brian, Herbert Parsons, Adolph J. Rodenbeck, Jacob Gould Schurman, Henry L. Stimson, George W. Wickersham, Franklin A. Coles, Harry E. Lewis, Meier Steinbrink, Harry Heyman, John F. Ahearn, Abraham Harawitz, Alfred E. Smith, Harry E. Oxford, Morgan J. O'Brien, John B. Stanchfield, James A. Foley, De Lancey Nicoll, William F. Sheehan, Thomas Francis Smith, Thomas Maurice Mulry, John Thomas Dooling, John Godfrey Saxe II, Robert F. Wagner, Courtlandt Nicoll, Frederick C. Tanner, Mark Eisner, William M. K. Olcott, Martin Saxe, J. Sidney Bernstein, Nathan Burkan, Anthony J. Griffin, Louis F. Haffen, Francis W. Martin, George A. Blauvelt, Eugene Lamb Richards, Francis A. Winslow, Frank L. Young, Caleb H. Baumes, Lemuel E. Quigg, William Barnes Jr., Harold J. Hinman, Victor M. Allen, W. Barlow Dunlap, Louis M. Martin, Ray B. Smith, Israel T. Deyo, George E. Green, Jesse S. Phillips, James Wolcott Wadsworth, Frank M. Jones, Benjamin Rush Rhees, Homer E. A. Dick, Charles B. Sears, Matthias Endres, Frank W. Standart, and James S. Whipple.

Proposed changes included:

- A reorganization of state government leaving it with 17 departments, reducing the number of elected officials, and providing for the appointment of others
- Removing from the State Legislature the power to review local matters and private claims
- Budgetary regulation
- Improvements in the ways the State could become indebted
- Home rule for cities
- Giving the State Legislature the authority, with voters' consent, to alter county government
- Simplification of the court system
- State control over tax assessment
- Establishing a conservation commission to oversee natural resources
- Expanded rights for workers

All of the proposals from the seventh Constitutional Convention of 1915 were grouped into five questions, all of which were rejected by the people. However, all was not lost. In 1925, a revised Article 5, containing many proposals from the Fifth Convention of 1915, was submitted to the people/voters and accepted in a referendum/election. In 1927, the budget proposal from the Fifth Convention was also accepted.

=== 1921 Judiciary Convention ===
Originally, the 1915 Convention proposed numerous overhauls to the judicial system. The Legislature rejected this article and it was not sent to the voters. However, in 1921, the Legislature authorized a group of thirty people to revise the judiciary article of the 1894 Constitution. However, the proposed article included many proposals from the 1915 Convention, and was again rejected by the Legislature.

=== Constitutional Convention of 1938 ===
The Constitution established in 1894 required the voters to vote on the necessity of a subsequent constitutional convention in 1936. On November 3, 1936, the voters approved the holding of a Convention which was held two years later in 1938.

There were 168 delegates to the Eighth Constitutional Convention of 1938. These included Alfred E. Smith (former Governor and presidential candidate), Hamilton Fish III (U.S. Representative), Robert F. Wagner (U.S. senator), and Robert Moses (major builder as head of the Triborough Bridge Authority). The Convention was chaired by Frederick E. Crane, the Chief Judge of the State Court of Appeals. Governor Herbert Lehman appointed Charles Poletti to head a committee to gather information for the convention's use. The twelve-volume report they produced is called the "Poletti Report".

The 1938 Convention did not actually adopt a new Constitution, but it did propose changes (57 amendments in all) to the continuing Constitution of 1894, which were bundled into nine questions for the voters; only six questions of amendments were approved. Changes approved were:

- The State Legislature was now authorized to enact a Social Security program
- The State Legislature could provide funding to eliminate railroad crossings
- New York City was excluded from debt limits in order to finance a public rapid transport system
- An amendment setting out the rights of public works projects workers
- A number of non-controversial amendments
- Permission for the State Legislature to fund transportation to parochial schools

=== Constitutional Convention of 1967 ===
In the 1960s, with the increasing changes and expansions of populations with the changing society, demand grew for a new Constitution. Thus, in 1965, the State Legislature put the question to the voters on the holding of a constitutional convention in 1967, and the voters approved it. A committee was established to gather information for the Convention. In 1966, 186 people were elected to become members in the 9th Constitutional Convention. Unlike all of the other Conventions, the candidates for membership ran in partisan elections of which the Democrats won a majority. The Convention was chaired by Anthony Travia, the Speaker of the State Assembly.

Proposed changes included:

- Expansion of individual citizens' rights
- Repealing of the 19th Century Blaine Amendment, which prohibited the State from funding parochial schools
- State takeover of costs for the court system, and the administration of welfare programs
- Allowing the legislature to incur debt without referendum
- The addition of a "statute of restrictions," or "two-part constitution," whereby a short Constitution would be enacted, with other provisions being placed in a separate document that differed from normal statute, as it took two years to amend

The proposed changes were bundled into one document and were met with stiff opposition. Thus, in November 1967, the voters rejected the new Constitution, with no county voting in favor.

=== 2001 change ===
The language of the Constitution became gender-neutral in 2001.

=== 2024 November amendment ===
In November 2024, a referendum was approved that modified section 11 of article 1 of the Constitution this way (removals struck, additions underlined):

§ 11. a. No person shall be denied the equal protection of the laws of this state or any subdivision thereof. No person shall, because of race, color, ethnicity, national origin, age, disability, creed ~~or~~, religion, or sex, including sexual orientation, gender identity, gender expression, pregnancy, pregnancy outcomes, and reproductive health care and autonomy, be subjected to any discrimination in ~~his or her~~ their civil rights by any other person or by any firm, corporation, or institution, or by the state or any agency or subdivision of the state, pursuant to law.
b. Nothing in this section shall invalidate or prevent the adoption of any law, regulation, program, or practice that is designed to prevent or dismantle discrimination on the basis of a characteristic listed in this section, nor shall any characteristic listed in this section be interpreted to interfere with, limit, or deny the civil rights of any person based upon any other characteristic identified in this section.

== Amending the Constitution ==
The current New York State Constitution of 1894/1938 can be amended in two main ways:

- By a proposal of an amendment in the Legislature, subject to voter approval, or
- Through a Convention, also subject to voter approval, which can be called in one of two ways:

- By proposal of the Legislature, subject to voter approval
- Through the automatic referendum every twenty years

Any legislative proposal must be approved by two successive Legislatures before being submitted for voter approval. If a convention is called, fifteen at-large members and three members per Senate district will be elected. These members will be compensated on the level of an Assembly member. The Convention will meet continuously in the Capitol until they conclude their work from the first Tuesday of April following their election.

Whether or not a limited-call convention dealing with specific issues is constitutional or not remains unclear. Proponents argue that because the Constitution is a limiting, and not a granting, document, then it is. They point to the fact that the 1801 Convention was a limited-call one. Opponents argue that because the Constitution does not expressly provide for such a Convention, any such convention would be unconstitutional.

== See also ==
- Law of New York
- John Rodgers (clergyman), Chaplain at the New York Constitutional Convention
