= 1865 New York state election =

- November 7, 1865

The 1865 New York state election was held on November 7, 1865, to elect the Secretary of State, the State Comptroller, the Attorney General, the State Treasurer, the State Engineer, two Judges of the New York Court of Appeals, a Canal Commissioners, an Inspector of State Prisons and the Clerk of the Court of Appeals, as well as all members of the New York State Assembly and the New York State Senate.

== History ==
The Democratic state convention met on September 6 and 7 at Albany, New York. C. H. Winfield was Temporary Chairman until the choice of James M. Humphrey as president.;

The Republican state convention met on September 20 at Syracuse, New York. Charles J. Folger was Temporary Chairman until the choice of Chauncey M. Depew as Permanent Chairman. Ward Hunt and John K. Porter were nominated for the Court of Appeals by acclamation. Francis Barlow was nominated for Secretary of State on the first ballot (vote: Barlow 191, Charles H. Van Wyck 172, Daniel E. Sickles 3, Chauncey M. Depew [incumbent] 1). Thomas Hillhouse was nominated for Comptroller on the first ballot (vote: Hillhouse 253, James A. Bell 82, Tracy Beadle 25). John Howland was nominated for Treasurer on the first ballot (vote: Howland 208, George W. Schuyler [incumbent] 146). John H. Martindale was nominated for Attorney General by acclamation. J. Platt Goodsell was nominated for State Engineer on the second ballot (first ballot: Goodsell 123, Charles K. Graham 123, William B. Taylor [incumbent] 72, Charles W. Mentz 26, Daniel C. Jeune 21; second ballot: Goodsell 200, Graham 153, Taylor 7). Robert C. Dorn was nominated for Canal Commissioner on the first ballot (vote: Dorn 186, Alexander Barkley 160). Henry A. Barnum was nominated for Prison Inspector during the first ballot. Patrick H. Jones was nominated for Clerk of the Court of Appeals by acclamation.

== Results ==
The whole Republican ticket was elected.

The incumbent Porter was re-elected. The incumbent Robinson was defeated.

27 Republicans and 5 Democrats were elected to a two-year term (1866–67) in the New York State Senate.

91 Republicans and 37 Democrats were elected for the session of 1866 to the New York State Assembly.

1865 state election results
Office	Republican ticket		Democratic ticket	
Secretary of State	Francis C. Barlow	301,055	Henry W. Slocum	273,198
Comptroller	Thomas Hillhouse	302,428	Lucius Robinson	271,852
Attorney General	John H. Martindale	302,437	John Van Buren	271,264
Treasurer	Joseph Howland	302,245	Marsena R. Patrick	272,039
State Engineer	J. Platt Goodsell	302,001	Sylvanus H. Sweet	272,338
Judge of the Court of Appeals (full term)	Ward Hunt		John W. Brown	
Judge of the Court of Appeals (short term)	John K. Porter		Martin Grover	
Canal Commissioner	Robert C. Dorn	303,556	Cornelius W. Armstrong	270,700
Inspector of State Prisons	Henry A. Barnum	301,925	Andrew J. McNett	271,957
Clerk of the Court of Appeals	Patrick H. Jones		Edwin O. Perrin	

== See also ==
- New York state elections

== Sources ==
- Result in The Tribune Almanac compiled by Horace Greeley of the New York Tribune (Greeley still identifies the Republicans as "Unionists", but by the time of this election the Civil War was over and the parties re-aligned. For example, the Democratic ticket had Union generals Slocum and Patrick, War Democrat Van Buren, and pre-war Republican Robinson.)
- The tickets: THE ELECTION TO-DAY in NYT on November 7, 1865 (giving "Republican" and "Democratic" tickets)
