= 1908 United States presidential election in New York =

- November 3, 1908
- Turnout: 79.7% ▼3.6 pp

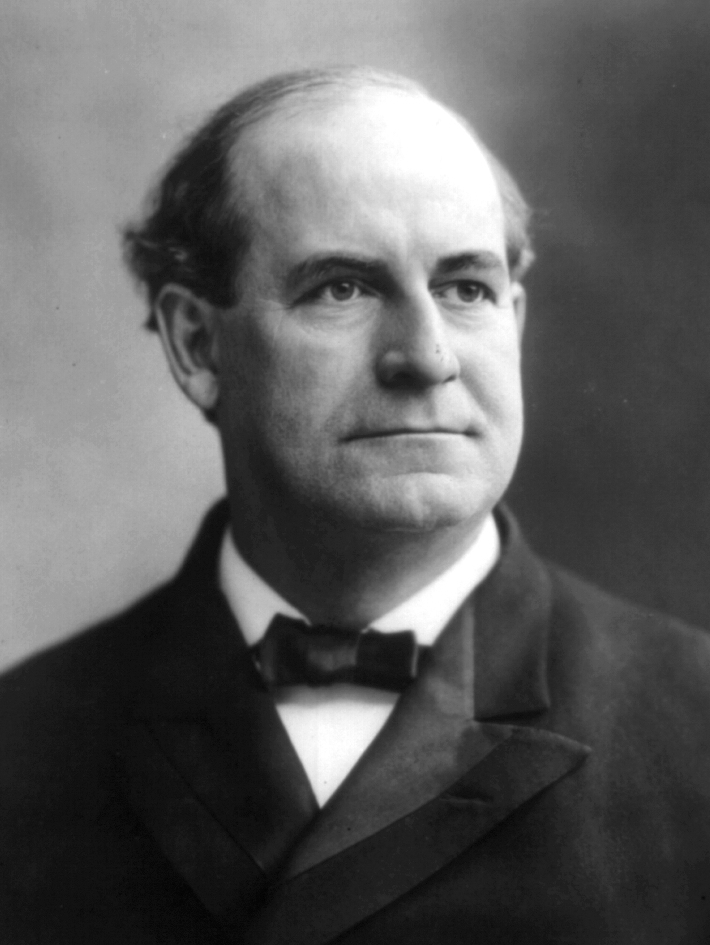
Nominee	William Howard Taft	William Jennings Bryan
Party	Republican	Democratic
Home state	Ohio	Nebraska
Running mate	James S. Sherman	John W. Kern
Electoral vote	39	0
Popular vote	870,070	667,468
Percentage	53.11%	40.74%
County results
Taft
50–60%
60–70%
Bryan
40–50%
50–60%
President before election
Theodore Roosevelt
Republican
Elected President
William Howard Taft
Republican

The 1908 United States presidential election in New York took place on November 3, 1908. All 46 contemporary states were part of the 1908 United States presidential election. Voters chose 39 electors to the Electoral College, which selected the president and vice president.

New York was won by the Republican nominees, United States Secretary of War William Howard Taft of Ohio and his running mate Congressman James S. Sherman of New York. Taft and Sherman defeated the Democratic nominees, former Congressman and two-time prior presidential candidate William Jennings Bryan of Nebraska and his running mate Senator John W. Kern of Indiana. Also in the running was the Socialist Party candidate, Eugene V. Debs, who ran with Ben Hanford.

Taft carried New York State with 53.11% of the vote to Bryan's 40.74%, a victory margin of 12.37%. Debs finished a distant third, receiving 2.35% of the vote in the state.

New York weighed in for this election as about 4% more Republican than the national average. New York would prove to be a Republican stronghold during the Fourth Party System, voting for Republican candidates in the presidential elections of that era barring Woodrow Wilson's win four years later. This was the first time since its incorporation in 1898 that a Republican won New York City, something that has happened twice since, in 1920 and 1924.

Bryan had previously lost New York twice to William McKinley in both 1896 and 1900.

== Results ==
1908 United States presidential election in New York
Party	Candidate	Votes	Percentage	Electoral votes
Republican	William Howard Taft	870,070	53.11%	39
Democratic	William Jennings Bryan	667,468	40.74%	0
Socialist	Eugene V. Debs	38,451	2.35%	0
Independence League	Thomas L. Hisgen	35,817	2.19%	0
Prohibition	Eugene W. Chafin	22,667	1.38%	0
Socialist Labor	August Gillhaus	3,877	0.24%	0
Totals		1,638,350	100.0%	39

=== New York City results ===
1908 Presidential Election in New York City		Manhattan	The Bronx	Brooklyn	Queens	Staten Island	Total	
Republican	William Howard Taft	154,958		119,789	19,420	6,831	300,998	46.86%
Republican	William Howard Taft	44.71%		50.64%	44.13%	45.29%	300,998	46.86%
Democratic	William Jennings Bryan	160,261		96,756	20,342	7,401	284,760	44.34%
Democratic	William Jennings Bryan	46.24%		40.90%	46.22%	49.07%	284,760	44.34%
Independence League	Thomas L. Hisgen	14,125		10,448	2,284	523	27,380	4.26%
Independence League	Thomas L. Hisgen	4.08%		4.42%	5.19%	3.47%	27,380	4.26%
Socialist	Eugene V. Debs	15,599		8,422	1,751	193	25,965	4.04%
Socialist	Eugene V. Debs	4.50%		3.56%	3.98%	1.28%	25,965	4.04%
Socialist Labor	August Gillhaus	1,162		625	93	32	1,912	0.30%
Socialist Labor	August Gillhaus	0.34%		0.26%	0.21%	0.21%	1,912	0.30%
Prohibition	Eugene W. Chafin	507		530	118	104	1,259	0.20%
Prohibition	Eugene W. Chafin	0.15%		0.22%	0.27%	0.69%	1,259	0.20%
TOTAL		346,612		236,570	44,008	15,084	642,274	100.00%

=== Results by county ===
County	William Howard Taft Republican		William Jennings Bryan Democratic		Eugene Victor Debs Socialist		Various candidates Other parties		Margin		Total votes cast
County	#	%	#	%	#	%	#	%	#	%	Total votes cast
Albany	24,763	55.93%	18,732	42.31%	206	0.47%	576	1.30%	6,031	13.62%	44,277
Allegany	7,504	64.64%	3,390	29.20%	46	0.40%	669	5.76%	4,114	35.44%	11,609
Broome	10,705	58.15%	6,671	36.24%	99	0.54%	933	5.07%	4,034	21.91%	18,408
Cattaraugus	9,320	56.93%	6,096	37.24%	281	1.72%	674	4.12%	3,224	19.69%	16,371
Cayuga	9,699	58.34%	5,789	34.82%	595	3.58%	541	3.25%	3,910	23.52%	16,624
Chautauqua	15,739	65.62%	6,158	25.67%	988	4.12%	1,100	4.59%	9,581	39.95%	23,985
Chemung	7,410	53.11%	5,966	42.76%	80	0.57%	496	3.56%	1,444	10.35%	13,952
Chenango	5,949	57.52%	3,772	36.47%	67	0.65%	554	5.36%	2,177	21.05%	10,342
Clinton	5,474	55.54%	3,866	39.22%	54	0.55%	462	4.69%	1,608	16.31%	9,856
Columbia	5,726	51.54%	5,097	45.88%	16	0.14%	270	2.43%	629	5.66%	11,109
Cortland	5,090	62.26%	2,616	32.00%	12	0.15%	458	5.60%	2,474	30.26%	8,176
Delaware	7,142	58.28%	4,641	37.87%	21	0.17%	451	3.68%	2,501	20.41%	12,255
Dutchess	11,132	53.58%	8,961	43.13%	73	0.35%	609	2.93%	2,171	10.45%	20,775
Erie	52,182	52.36%	45,185	45.34%	1,234	1.24%	1,059	1.06%	6,997	7.02%	99,660
Essex	5,167	69.09%	2,033	27.18%	60	0.80%	219	2.93%	3,134	41.90%	7,479
Franklin	5,999	64.13%	2,935	31.37%	21	0.22%	400	4.28%	3,064	32.75%	9,355
Fulton	6,574	57.96%	3,508	30.93%	565	4.98%	695	6.13%	3,066	27.03%	11,342
Genesee	5,794	62.26%	3,171	34.07%	14	0.15%	327	3.51%	2,623	28.19%	9,306
Greene	4,191	50.42%	3,711	44.64%	63	0.76%	348	4.19%	480	5.77%	8,313
Hamilton	632	50.00%	586	46.36%	1	0.08%	45	3.56%	46	3.64%	1,264
Herkimer	8,202	55.88%	5,918	40.32%	156	1.06%	403	2.75%	2,284	15.56%	14,679
Jefferson	11,477	57.93%	6,694	33.79%	436	2.20%	1,206	6.09%	4,783	24.14%	19,813
Kings	119,789	50.64%	96,756	40.90%	8,422	3.56%	11,603	4.90%	23,033	9.74%	236,570
Lewis	4,159	58.13%	2,810	39.27%	13	0.18%	173	2.42%	1,349	18.85%	7,155
Livingston	5,700	59.74%	3,567	37.38%	14	0.15%	261	2.74%	2,133	22.35%	9,542
Madison	6,727	61.28%	3,637	33.13%	141	1.28%	473	4.31%	3,090	28.15%	10,978
Monroe	33,250	56.69%	22,704	38.71%	1,521	2.59%	1,174	2.00%	10,546	17.98%	58,649
Montgomery	7,571	57.02%	5,254	39.57%	58	0.44%	395	2.97%	2,317	17.45%	13,278
Nassau	9,787	63.04%	4,883	31.45%	86	0.55%	769	4.95%	4,904	31.59%	15,525
New York	154,958	44.71%	160,261	46.24%	15,599	4.50%	15,794	4.56%	-5,303	-1.53%	346,612
Niagara	11,145	54.75%	8,574	42.12%	95	0.47%	542	2.66%	2,571	12.63%	20,356
Oneida	19,346	54.59%	14,968	42.24%	250	0.71%	873	2.46%	4,378	12.35%	35,437
Onondaga	27,209	58.70%	16,643	35.90%	1,116	2.41%	1,387	2.99%	10,566	22.79%	46,355
Ontario	8,245	58.73%	5,484	39.06%	82	0.58%	229	1.63%	2,761	19.67%	14,040
Orange	14,414	57.03%	9,938	39.32%	194	0.77%	730	2.89%	4,476	17.71%	25,276
Orleans	4,885	62.31%	2,590	33.04%	27	0.34%	338	4.31%	2,295	29.27%	7,840
Oswego	10,447	58.22%	6,172	34.39%	76	0.42%	1,250	6.97%	4,275	23.82%	17,945
Otsego	7,459	53.37%	5,975	42.75%	24	0.17%	519	3.71%	1,484	10.62%	13,977
Putnam	2,275	60.70%	1,369	36.53%	4	0.11%	100	2.67%	906	24.17%	3,748
Queens	19,420	44.13%	20,342	46.22%	1,751	3.98%	2,495	5.67%	-922	-2.10%	44,008
Rensselaer	17,196	54.92%	13,162	42.04%	224	0.72%	729	2.33%	4,034	12.88%	31,311
Richmond	6,831	45.29%	7,401	49.07%	193	1.28%	659	4.37%	-570	-3.78%	15,084
Rockland	4,857	52.64%	3,937	42.67%	88	0.95%	345	3.74%	920	9.97%	9,227
Saratoga	8,706	54.49%	6,518	40.80%	155	0.97%	597	3.74%	2,188	13.70%	15,976
Schenectady	9,944	52.72%	7,129	37.80%	1,110	5.88%	679	3.60%	2,815	14.92%	18,862
Schoharie	3,393	45.22%	3,841	51.19%	5	0.07%	265	3.53%	-448	-5.97%	7,504
Schuyler	2,417	56.60%	1,695	39.70%	16	0.37%	142	3.33%	722	16.91%	4,270
Seneca	3,749	52.80%	3,136	44.16%	54	0.76%	162	2.28%	613	8.63%	7,101
St. Lawrence	14,151	67.87%	5,898	28.29%	61	0.29%	739	3.54%	8,253	39.58%	20,849
Steuben	12,313	56.33%	8,366	38.27%	237	1.08%	943	4.31%	3,947	18.06%	21,859
Suffolk	10,689	60.29%	5,877	33.15%	283	1.60%	881	4.97%	4,812	27.14%	17,730
Sullivan	4,593	52.52%	3,911	44.72%	55	0.63%	187	2.14%	682	7.80%	8,746
Tioga	4,247	58.55%	2,706	37.30%	45	0.62%	256	3.53%	1,541	21.24%	7,254
Tompkins	5,090	55.13%	3,734	40.45%	50	0.54%	358	3.88%	1,356	14.69%	9,232
Ulster	10,475	53.06%	8,560	43.36%	107	0.54%	598	3.03%	1,915	9.70%	19,740
Warren	4,800	58.61%	3,019	36.86%	60	0.73%	311	3.80%	1,781	21.75%	8,190
Washington	7,933	65.63%	3,593	29.73%	110	0.91%	451	3.73%	4,340	35.91%	12,087
Wayne	8,008	62.68%	4,404	34.47%	56	0.44%	309	2.42%	3,604	28.21%	12,777
Westchester	29,438	58.38%	18,346	36.38%	923	1.83%	1,715	3.40%	11,092	22.00%	50,422
Wyoming	5,308	62.32%	2,885	33.87%	28	0.33%	296	3.48%	2,423	28.45%	8,517
Yates	3,275	60.98%	1,927	35.88%	30	0.56%	139	2.59%	1,348	25.10%	5,371
Totals	870,070	53.11%	667,468	40.74%	38,451	2.35%	62,361	3.81%	202,602	12.37%	1,638,350

== See also ==
- United States presidential elections in New York
- Presidency of William Howard Taft
