= Sylvanus H. Sweet =

American civil engineer and politician

Sylvanus Howe Sweet (August 8, 1830 Hinmansville, Oswego County, New York – November 17, 1899) was an American civil engineer and politician from New York. He was New York State Engineer and Surveyor from 1874 to 1875.

== Life ==
He graduated from Falley Seminary in Fulton in 1850.

Soon after his graduation, he was appointed assistant under Colonel Orville W. Childs on a survey for an inter oceanic ship canal through Nicaragua. Upon returning to the US, he accepted a position on the New York State canals and in 1853 was appointed Second Assistant Engineer. From 1854 to 1859, he was First Assistant Engineer and in 1861 was Principal Assistant Engineer on the New York Harbor Encroachment Survey. He was appointed Deputy State Engineer under William B. Taylor in 1862 and again under Van Rensselaer Richmond in 1868, serving from 1862 to 1864 and from 1868 to 1871. In 1865, he ran on the Democratic ticket for New York State Engineer and Surveyor but was defeated by Republican Jonas Platt Goodsell. In 1873, he ran again and was elected, being in office from 1874 to 1875. He later joined the United Labor Party and was nominated again for State Engineer in 1887, but declined the nomination.

He was also the Chief Engineer for the State on the Hudson River improvement, Engineer of the Commission for the construction of the Capitol at Albany, Chief Engineer of the Albany waterworks, of the projected Maryland and Delaware ship canal, and of the Commission for the construction of the Broadway Arcade Railway.

He was the author of The Documentary History of the Canals

== Sources ==
- Engineers bios, at Rochester history
- Political Graveyard

Political offices
Preceded by William B. Taylor	New York State Engineer and Surveyor; 1874 - 1875	Succeeded by John D. Van Buren, Jr.
