= 1918 New York state election =

- November 5, 1918

The 1918 New York state election was held on November 5, 1918, to elect the governor, the lieutenant governor, the secretary state, the state comptroller, the attorney general, the state treasurer and the state engineer, as well as all members of the New York State Assembly and the New York State Senate.

== History ==
This was the first state election following women's suffrage.

The primaries were held on September 3.

=== Republican primary ===
1918 Republican primary results
Office						
Governor	Charles S. Whitman	295,471	Merton E. Lewis	118,879		
Lieutenant Governor	Edward Schoeneck	226,530	William M. Bennett	97,902	Seth G. Heacock	51,648
Secretary of State	Francis M. Hugo	354,066	(unopposed)			
Comptroller	Eugene M. Travis	245,494	Samuel Frazer	93,308	John Kissel	25,829
Attorney General	Charles D. Newton	214,835	Alfred L. Becker	143,371		
Treasurer	James L. Wells	199,361	Theodore T. Baylor	146,998		
State Engineer	Frank M. Williams	342,571	(unopposed)			

=== Democratic primary ===
1918 Democratic primary results
Office				
Governor	Alfred E. Smith	199,752	William Church Osborn	32,761
Lieutenant Governor	Harry C. Walker	208,107	(unopposed)	
Secretary of State	Franklin E. Bard	205,304	(unopposed)	
Comptroller	Bird S. Coler	206,040	(unopposed)	
Attorney General	Charles Morschauser	199,471	(unopposed)	
Treasurer	Jacob G. Cohen	196,169	(unopposed)	
State Engineer	Dwight B. LaDu	200,116	(unopposed)	

=== Prohibition primary ===
The Prohibition state conference in July had designated State Chairman Olin S. Bishop to run in the primary for Governor, but on August 31 the enrolled party members received a circular from Bishop urging them to vote for the incumbent Republican Governor Charles S. Whitman by writing his name in the ballot. The friends of the incumbent Republican Comptroller Eugene M. Travis gathered enough signatures to put him on the Prohibition primary ballot, and the regular candidate Claude V. Stowell also urged the party members to vote for Travis.

1918 Prohibition primary results
Office				
Governor	Charles S. Whitman	5,855	Olin S. Bishop	5,621
Lieutenant Governor	Mamie W. Colvin	9,302	(unopposed)	
Secretary of State	Ella L. McCarthy	9,254	(unopposed)	
Comptroller	Eugene M. Travis	8,266	Claude V. Stowell	2,878
Attorney General	Clarence Z. Spriggs	9,295	(unopposed)	
Treasurer	George B. Humphrey	9,455	(unopposed)	
State Engineer	David B. Passage	9,189	(unopposed)	

=== Socialist primary ===
All Socialist primary candidates won without opposition.

1918 Socialist primary results
Office			
Governor	Charles W. Ervin	9,687	(unopposed)
Lieutenant Governor	Ella Reeve Bloor	9,271	(unopposed)
Secretary of State	Jessie W. Hughan	9,347	(unopposed)
Comptroller	James C. Sheahan	7,366	(unopposed)
Attorney General	Hezekiah D. Wilcox	9,139	(unopposed)
Treasurer	Charles W. Noonan	9,166	(unopposed)
State Engineer	Raymond Wilcox	9,150	(unopposed)

== Result ==
The Democratic candidates for Governor and Lieutenant Governor were elected with the remainder of the Republican ticket.

The incumbents Whitman and Schoeneck were defeated. The incumbents Hugo, Travis, Wells and Williams were re-elected.

1918 state election results
Office	Democratic ticket		Republican ticket		Socialist ticket		Prohibition ticket		Socialist Labor ticket	
Governor	Alfred E. Smith	1,009,936	Charles S. Whitman	956,034	Charles W. Ervin	121,705	Charles S. Whitman	38,794	Olive M. Johnson	5,183
Lieutenant Governor	Harry C. Walker	965,471	Edward Schoeneck	930,066	Ella Reeve Bloor	130,206	Mamie W. Colvin	48,142	August Gillhaus	5,605
Secretary of State	Franklin E. Bard	886,306	Francis M. Hugo	1,005,426	Jessie W. Hughan	134,520	Ella L. McCarthy	40,072	Edmund Moonelis	5,405
Comptroller	Bird S. Coler	909,255	Eugene M. Travis	1,007,483	James C. Sheahan	136,680	Eugene M. Travis		Charles E. Berns	5,996
Attorney General	Charles Morschauser	878,300	Charles D. Newton	990,863	Hezekiah D. Wilcox	136,992	Clarence Z. Spriggs	43,229	John Donahue	6,929
Treasurer	Jacob G. Cohen	839,777	James L. Wells	1,028,752	Charles W. Noonan	137,823	George B. Humphrey	44,606	Nadina Kavinoky	5,268
State Engineer	Dwight B. LaDu	865,573	Frank M. Williams	991,521	Raymond Wilcox	138,566	David B. Passage	40,628	Joseph Galotta	5,667

Obs.:

- "Blank, void and scattering" votes: 61,052 (Governor)
- The number for Travis is total on Republican and Prohibition tickets. The votes given for Governor were used to define the ballot access, and are given separately.

== See also ==
- New York gubernatorial elections

== Sources ==
- Early primary returns: WHITMAN NAMED TO FIGHT SMITH FOR GOVERNORSHIP in NYT on September 4, 1918
- Primary results: WHITMAN'S VOTE 295,471 in NYT on September 13, 1918
- Result in Westchester County: WHITMAN GAINS ONE VOTE IN THIS CITY in NYT on November 14, 1918
- Soldiers' vote in New York City: SOLDIERS ADD 7,419 TO SMITH PLURALITY in NYT on December 18, 1918
- Result: SMITH IS SWORN IN AS GOVERNOR in NYT on December 31, 1918
- Vote totals taken from The New York Red Book 1919
