= Dwight B. La Du =

American civil engineer and politician (1876–1954)

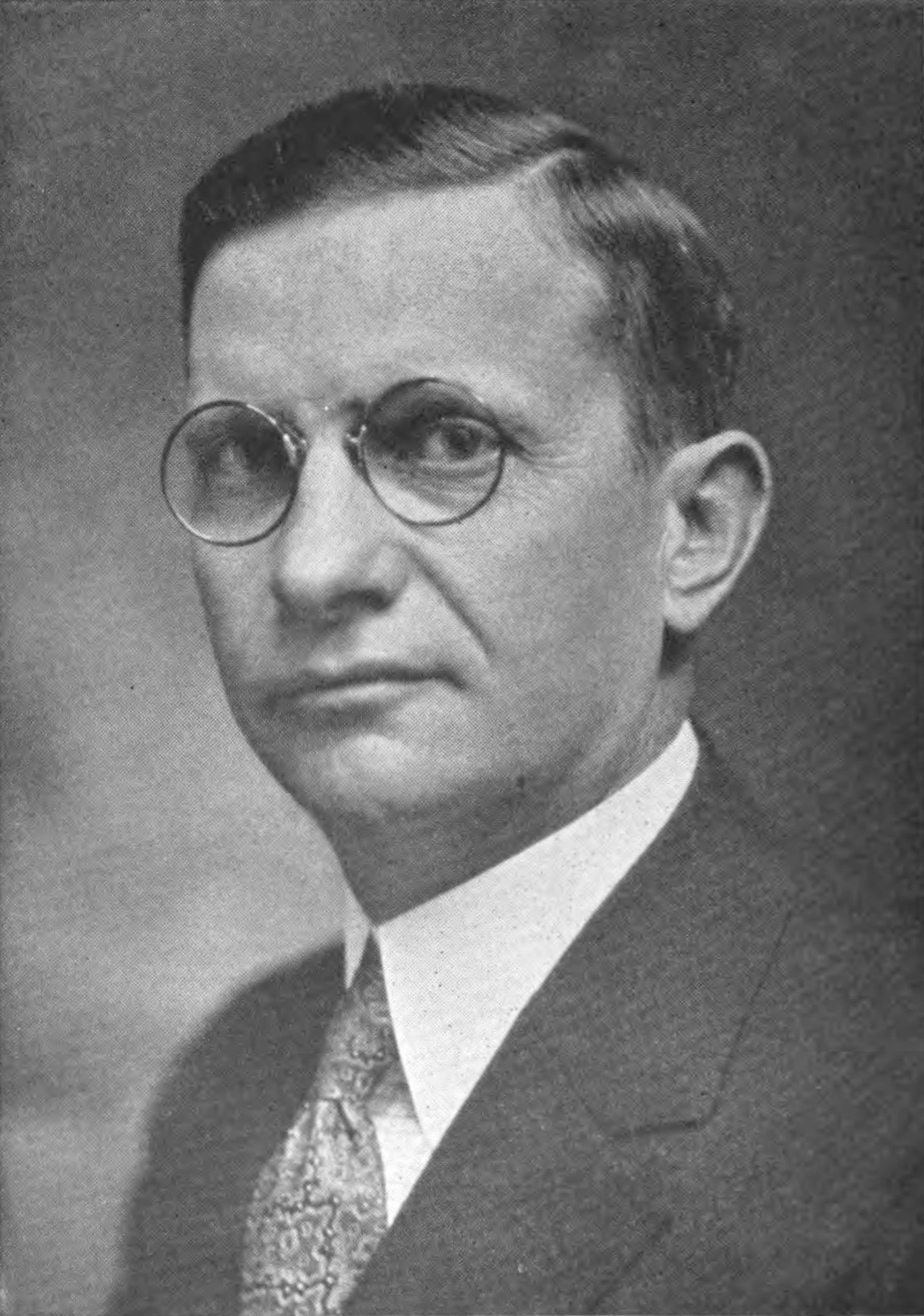
- Born: April 27, 1876; Van Buren, New York
- Died: August 16, 1954 (aged 78); Albany, New York

Dwight B. La Du (April 27, 1876 Van Buren, Onondaga County, New York – August 16, 1954 Albany, New York) was an American civil engineer and politician from New York. He was New York State Engineer and Surveyor from 1923 to 1924.

== Biography ==
He was born on April 27, 1876, to J. Sears La Du and Julia L. (Warner) La Du.

He was Division Engineer of the Eastern Division of the State Canals under John A. Bensel, and in 1914 was appointed Special Deputy State Engineer, a post he retained under Frank M. Williams. He resigned in the fall of 1918, and ran for State Engineer and Surveyor on the Democratic ticket in November 1918, but was defeated by Williams. In 1922, he ran again, and was elected, being in office from 1923 to 1924, but was defeated again for re-election in 1924 by Republican Roy G. Finch.

He died on August 16, 1954, at his home in Albany, New York. He was interred at Albany Rural Cemetery.

Political offices
Preceded by Frank M. Williams	New York State Engineer and Surveyor; 1923–1924	Succeeded by Roy G. Finch
