= 1924 New York state election =

1924 New York gubernatorial election
- November 4, 1924

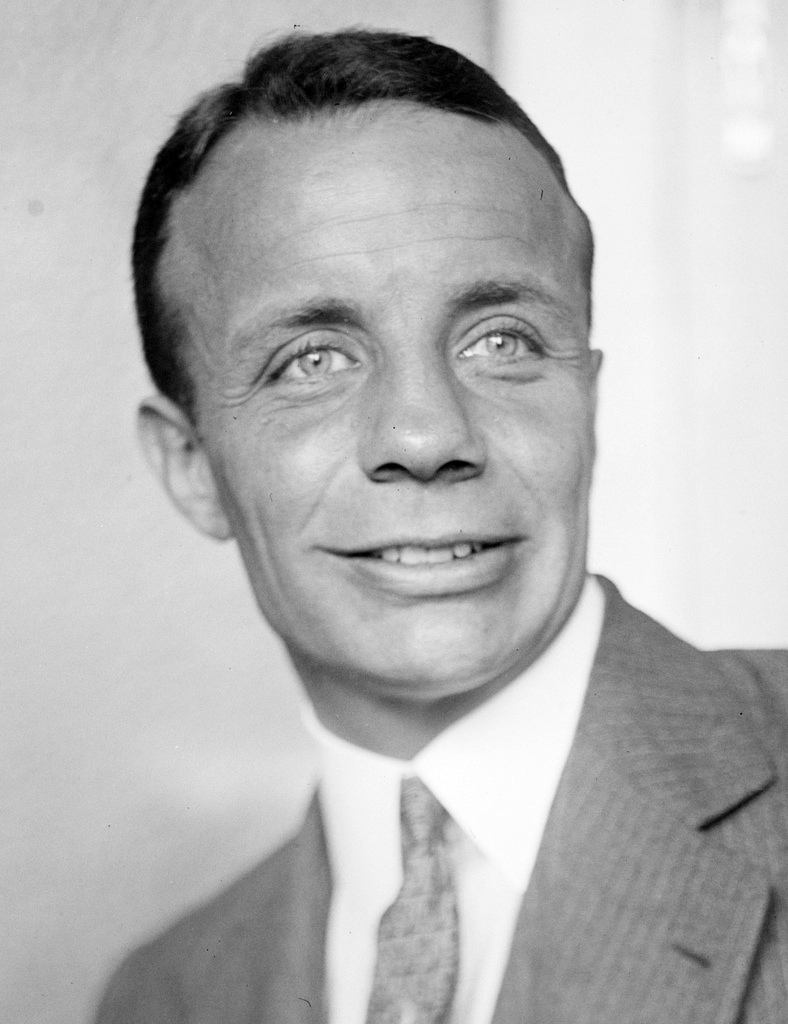
| Nominee | Al Smith | Theodore Roosevelt Jr. |
| Party | Democratic | Republican |
| Popular vote | 1,627,111 | 1,518,552 |
| Percentage | 49.96% | 46.63% |
- County results Smith: 50–60% 60–70% 70–80% Roosevelt: 50–60% 60–70% 70–80%
Governor before election
Al Smith
Democratic
Elected Governor
Al Smith
Democratic

The 1924 New York state election was held on November 4, 1924, to elect the governor, the lieutenant governor, the Secretary of State, the state comptroller, the attorney general, the state treasurer and the state engineer, as well as all members of the New York State Assembly and the New York State Senate.

== History ==
The Socialist state convention met on July 27 at Finnish Hall (at Fifth Avenue/Twelfth Street) in New York City. They nominated Rev. Norman Thomas for Governor and Charles Solomon for lieutenant governor.

The initially frontrunner for the Republican party was assembly speaker H. Edmund Machold, who quickly ruled himself out of the election. The Republican state convention met on September 25 in Rochester, New York. Theodore Roosevelt Jr., was nominated for governor on the first ballot.

The Democratic state convention met on September 25 in Syracuse, New York, and re-nominated all incumbent state officers.

== Result ==
Almost the whole Republican ticket was elected. Only the incumbent Democratic Governor Smith managed to stay in office.

The incumbent Smith was re-elected. The incumbents Lunn, Hamilton, Fleming, Sherman, Shuler and LaDu were defeated.

The Democratic, Republican and Socialist parties maintained automatic ballot access (necessary 25,000 votes for governor), the Socialist Labor Party did not re-attain it, and the Workers Party did not attain it.

Florence E. S. Knapp was the first woman elected to a statewide office in New York. She remained the only one for fifty years, until Mary Anne Krupsak was elected lieutenant governor in 1974.

1924 state election results
| Office | Democratic ticket | | Republican ticket | | Socialist ticket | | Workers ticket | | Socialist Labor ticket | |
|---|---|---|---|---|---|---|---|---|---|---|
| Governor | Alfred E. Smith | 1,627,111 | Theodore Roosevelt Jr. | 1,518,552 | Norman Thomas | 99,854 | James P. Cannon | 6,395 | Frank E. Passanno (Note: Frank E. Passanno, of Troy, ran also for attorney general in 1904; for lieutenant governor in 1906 and 1908; and for governor in 1910) | 4,931 |
| Lieutenant Governor | George R. Lunn | 1,430,321 | Seymour Lowman | 1,526,849 | Charles Solomon | 126,679 | Franklin P. Brill | 8,925 | Milton Weinberger | 8,377 |
| Secretary of State | James A. Hamilton | 1,397,804 | Florence E. S. Knapp | 1,530,763 | Frank R. Crosswaith | 136,278 | Lilly Lore | 9,983 | Frank Gorney Jr. | 7,930 |
| Comptroller | James W. Fleming | 1,362,092 | Vincent B. Murphy | 1,524,670 | Theresa B. Wiley (Note: Theresa B. Wiley, of Schenectady, ran also for lieutenant governor in 1922) | 142,312 | Abraham Epstein | 16,866 | | |
| Attorney General | Carl Sherman | 1,362,585 | Albert Ottinger | 1,541,166 | Louis Waldman | 140,424 | Arthur S. Leeds | 9,502 | Joseph Brandon | 8,111 |
| Treasurer | George K. Shuler | 1,325,695 | Lewis H. Pounds | 1,568,965 | John H. VandenBosch | 134,039 | Edward Lindgren | 9,826 | John E. DeLee (Note: John E. DeLee, ran also for comptroller in 1920; and for lieutenant governor in 1922) | 8,747 |
| State Engineer | Dwight B. LaDu | 1,296,954 | Roy G. Finch | 1,568,965 | Vladimir Karapetoff | 138,182 | Richard J. Verhagen | 9,567 | Simeon Bickwheat (Note: Simeon Bickwheat, ran also in 1922) | 7,934 |

This was the last election of a Secretary of State, a Treasurer and a State Engineer. The Secretary of State has been appointive since January 1927, the other two offices were abolished. The duties of the Treasurer were transferred to the Comptroller, those of the State Engineer to the Superintendent of Public Works which has been always an appointive office.

== See also ==
- New York gubernatorial elections

== Sources ==
- New York State Red Book 1925
- Madaras, Lawrence H. “THEODORE ROOSEVELT, JR. VERSUS AL SMITH: THE NEW YORK GUBERNATORIAL ELECTION OF 1924.” New York History 47, no. 4 (1966): 372–90. http://www.jstor.org/stable/23162551.
