= Cross Estate Gardens =

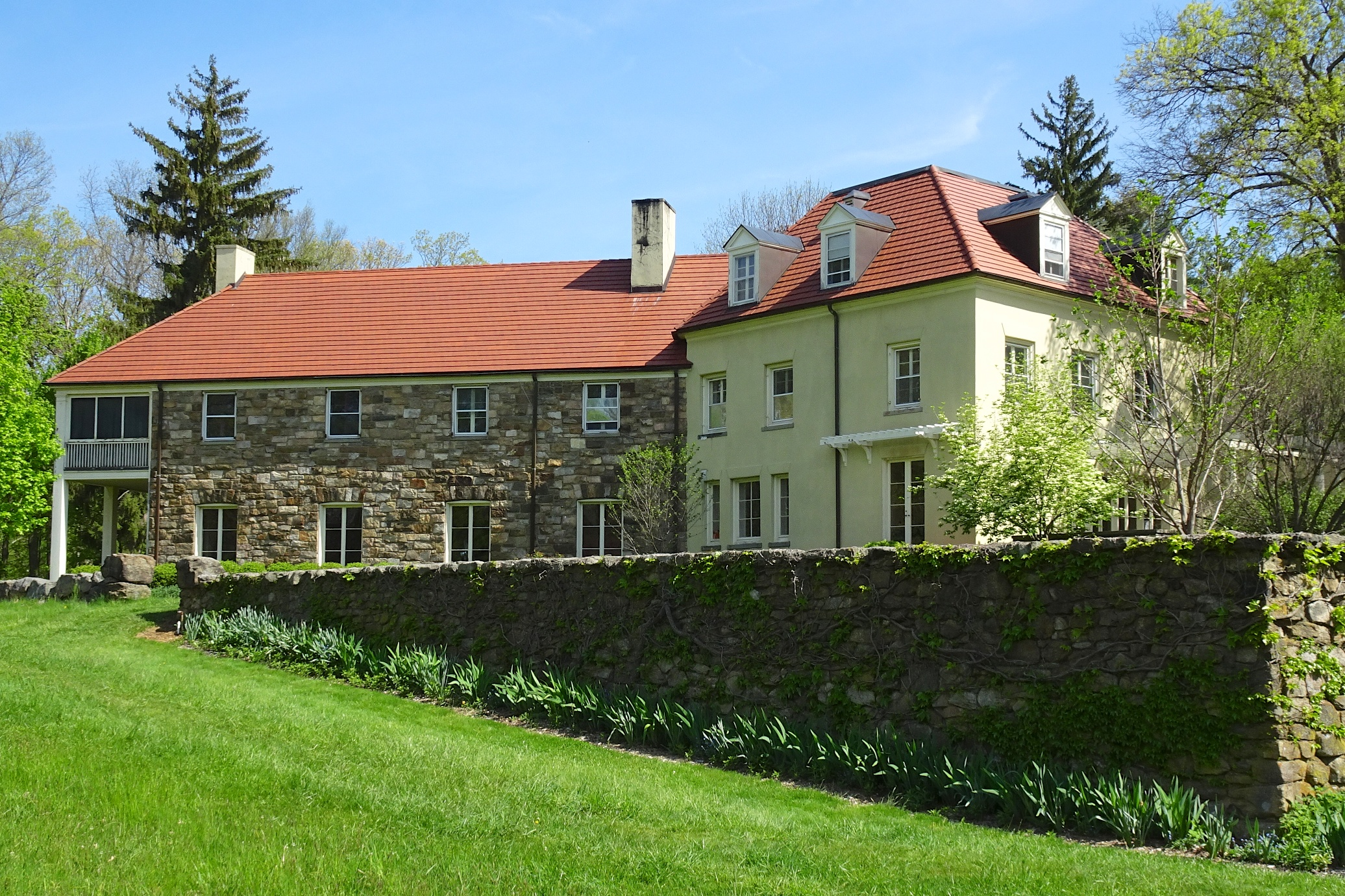
- Cross Estate Mansion

- Location within Somerset County, New Jersey Location within New Jersey Location within the United States
- Interactive map of Cross Estate Gardens
- Location: 61 Jockey Hollow Road; Bernardsville, New Jersey
- Coordinates: 40°44′53″N 74°33′34″W

Cross Estate Gardens, containing both formal and native plant gardens, is located at 61 Jockey Hollow Road in the borough of Bernardsville in Somerset County, New Jersey. It is part of the New Jersey Brigade Encampment Site of the Morristown National Historical Park. The property was acquired in 1975 by the National Park Service.

== History ==
The property was originally called "Queen Anne Farm" by the owners Mr. and Mrs. John Anderson Bensel between 1903 and 1906. It included a 23-room stone house and stone water tower. The next owners, W. Redmond and Julia Appleton Newbold Cross, called it "Hardscabble House" in 1929. The property was later acquired by the National Park Service in 1975 from their children.

== Gallery ==
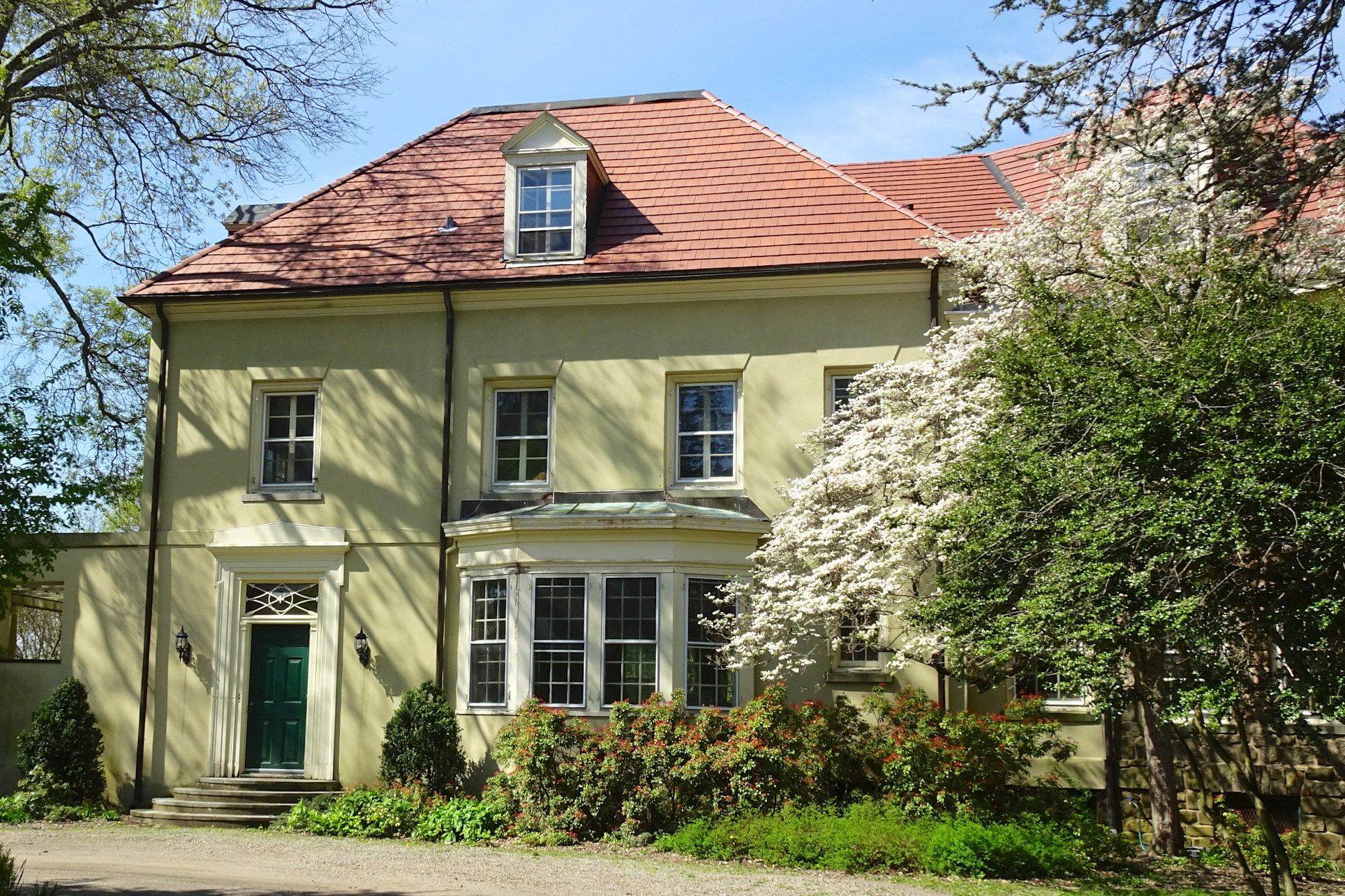
Mansion, view from the north

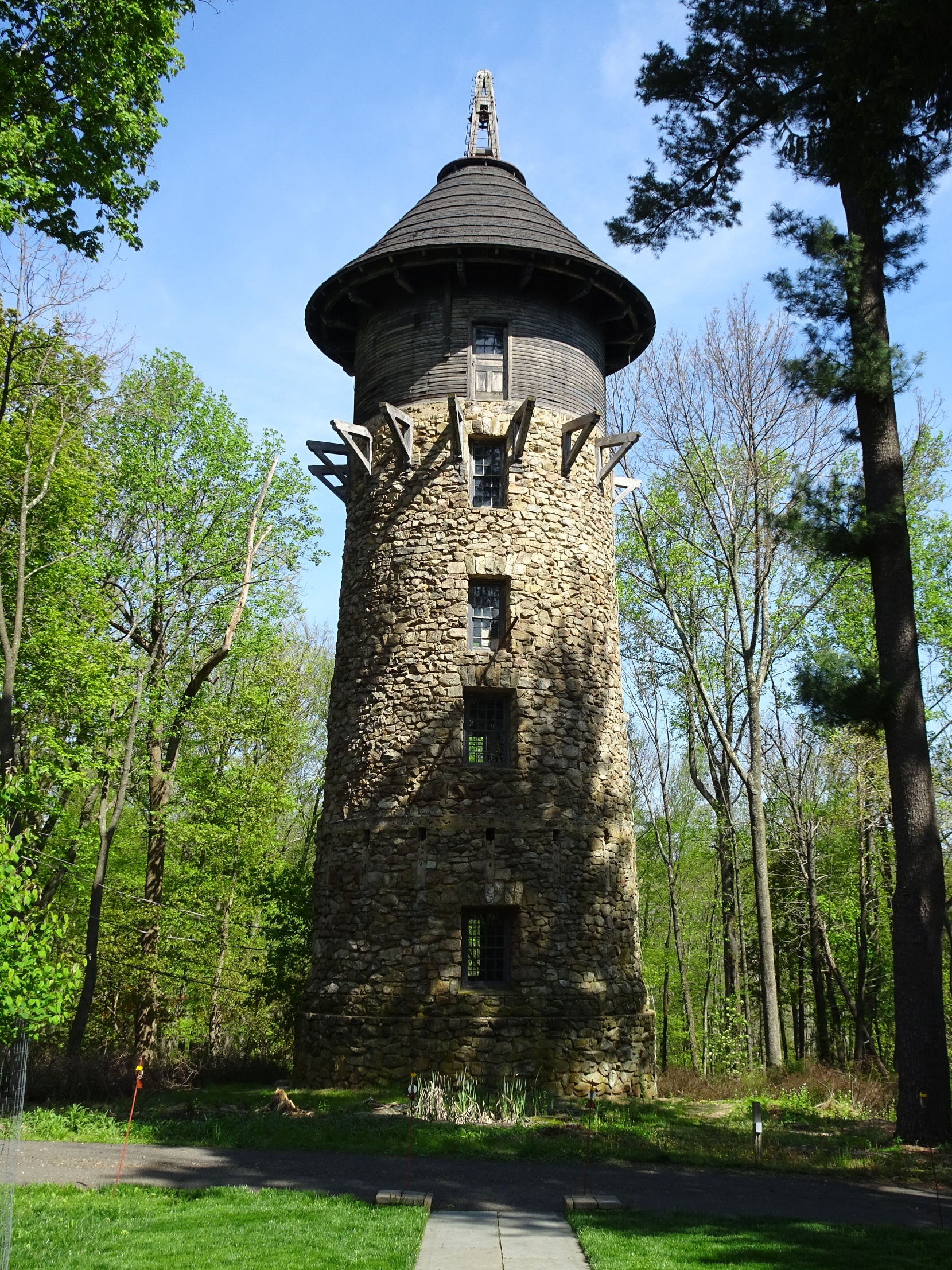
Water Tower
