= New Jersey Brigade Encampment Site =

- U.S. Historic district – Contributing property
- New Jersey Register of Historic Places
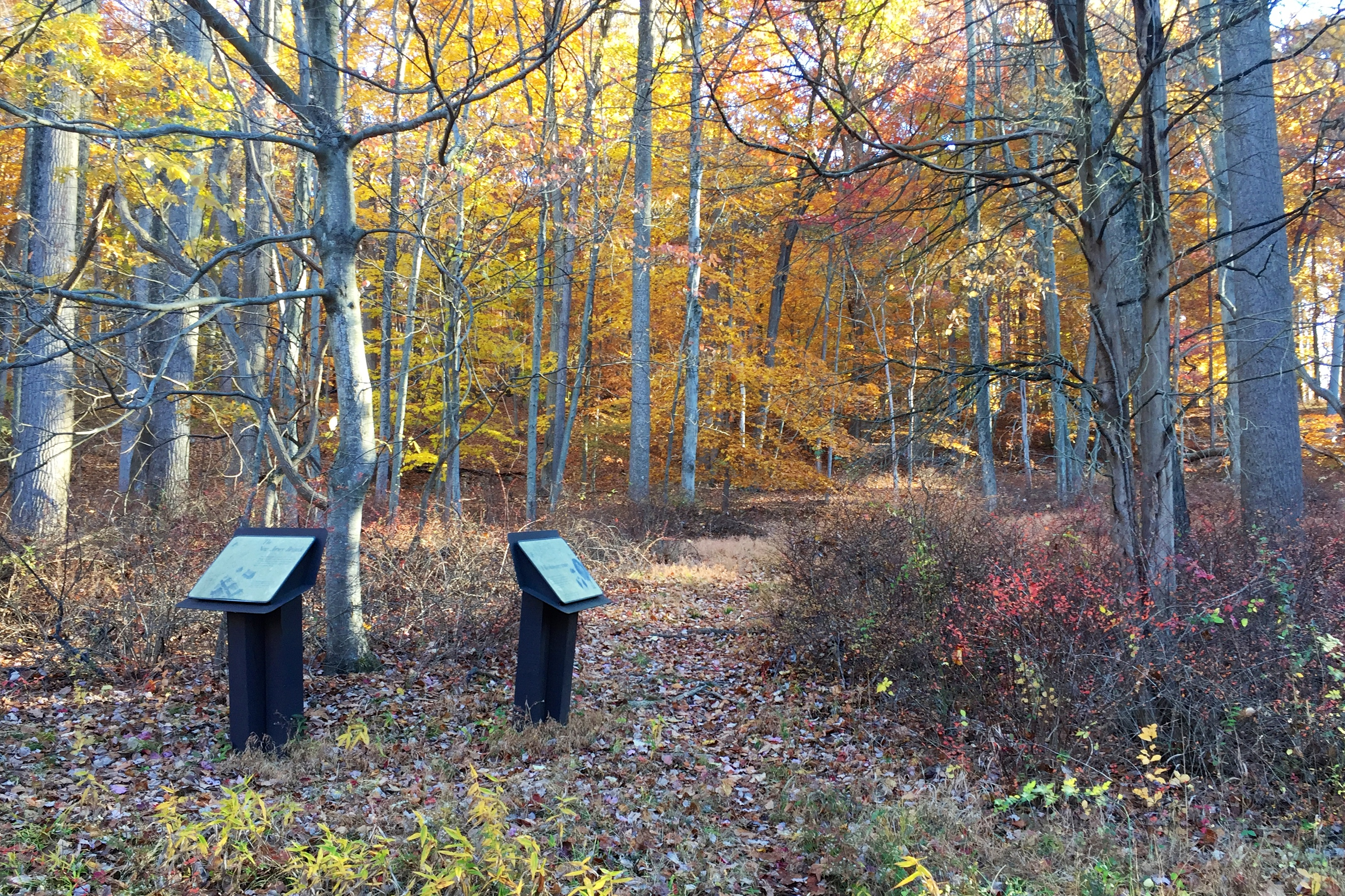
- Historical information signs by encampment site

- Location within Somerset County, New Jersey Location within New Jersey Location within the United States
- Coordinates: 40°44′53″N 74°33′34″W
- Area: 320.55 acres (1.2972 km^{2})
- Part of: Morristown National Historical Park (ID66000053)
- NJRHP No.: 3381

Significant dates
- Designated CP: October 15, 1966
- Designated NJRHP: May 27, 1971

The New Jersey Brigade Encampment Site, also called the New Jersey Brigade Area, was used by the Continental Army in the winter of 1779–80, during the American Revolutionary War. The site is located in Bernardsville, Somerset County, New Jersey and extends into Harding Township, Morris County. About 1,300 men of the New Jersey Brigade were encamped here. It is one of four contributing sites of the Morristown National Historical Park. The Cross Estate Gardens property was added in 1975.

The Patriots' Path, also known as the New Jersey Brigade Trail here, is needed to access the marked historical sites. One trailhead is on Hardscrabble Road, another on Jockey Hollow Road.

== History ==
During the "Hard Winter" of 1779–80, the Continental Army encamped at nearby Jockey Hollow except for the New Jersey Brigade, which encamped here. The New Jersey units were the 1st New Jersey Regiment, 2nd New Jersey Regiment, 3rd New Jersey Regiment and Spencer's Regiment.

== Gallery ==
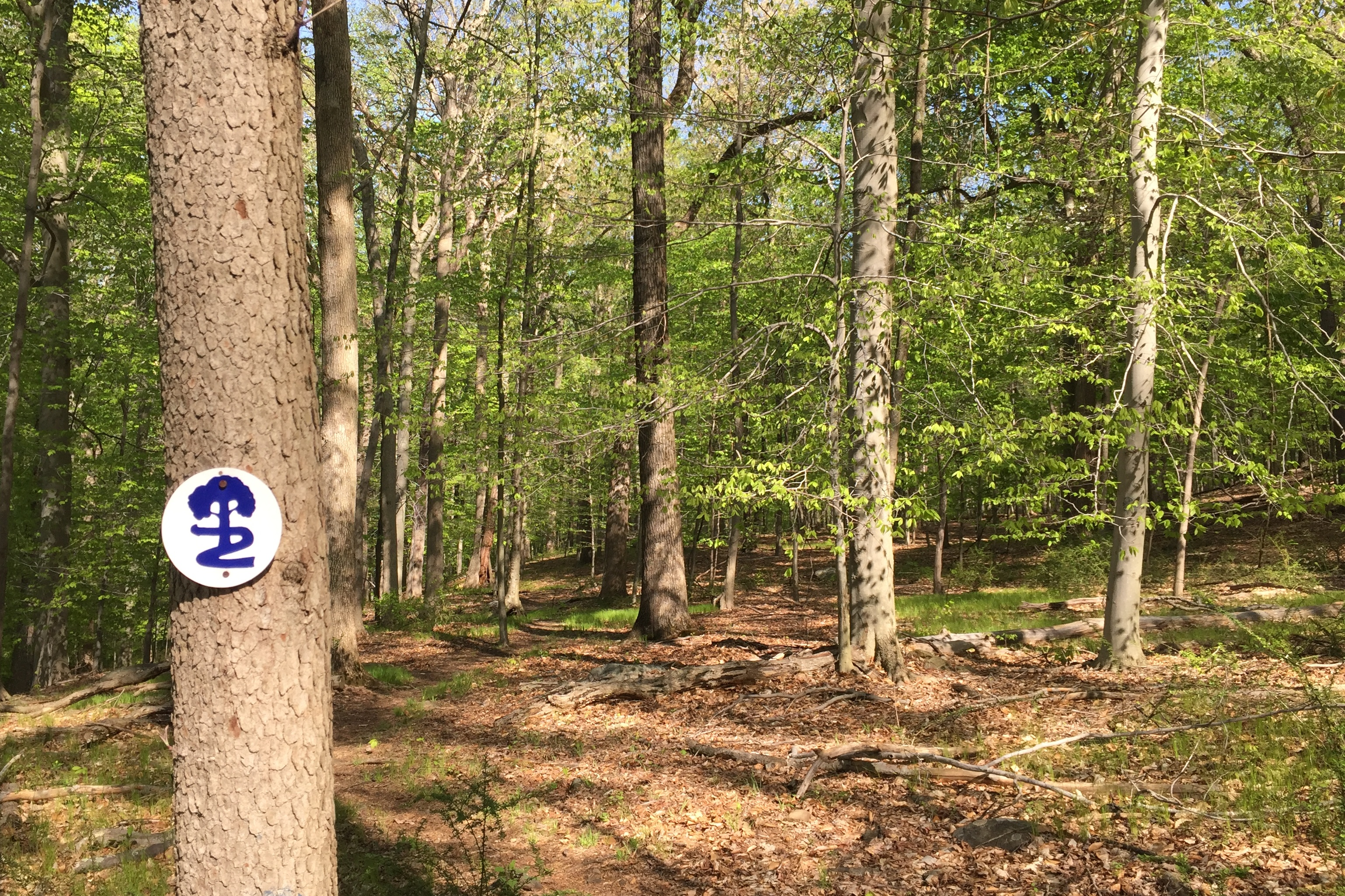
Patriots' Path leading to campsites

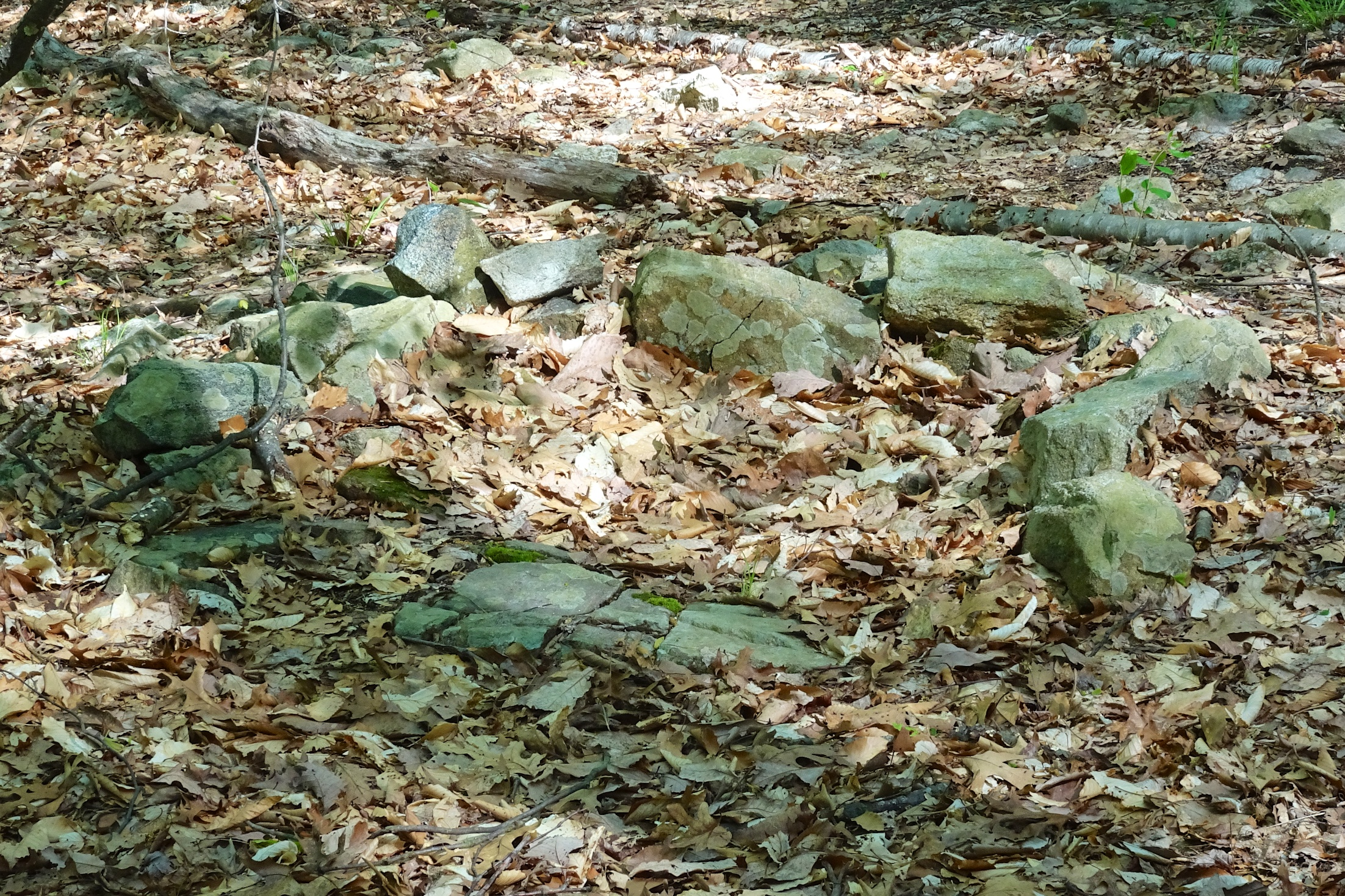
Fireplace remains

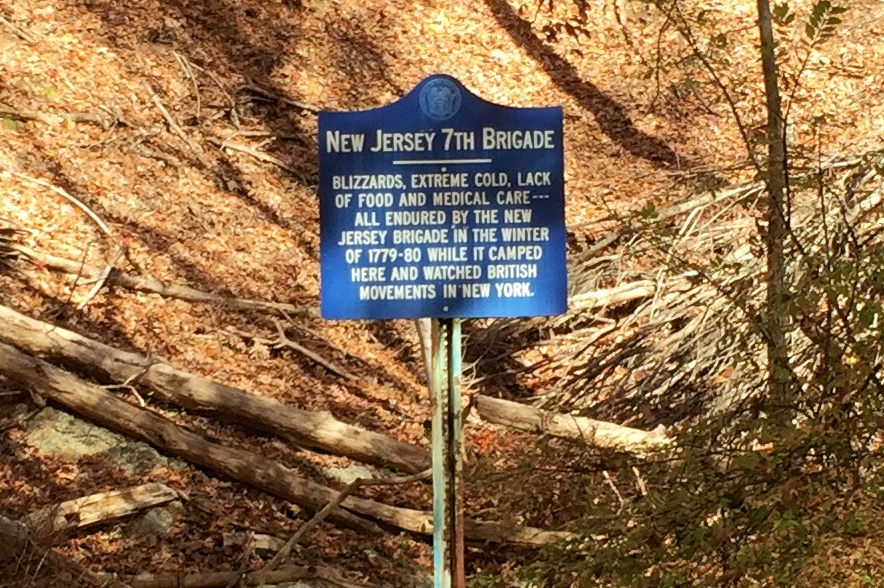
New Jersey 7th Brigade

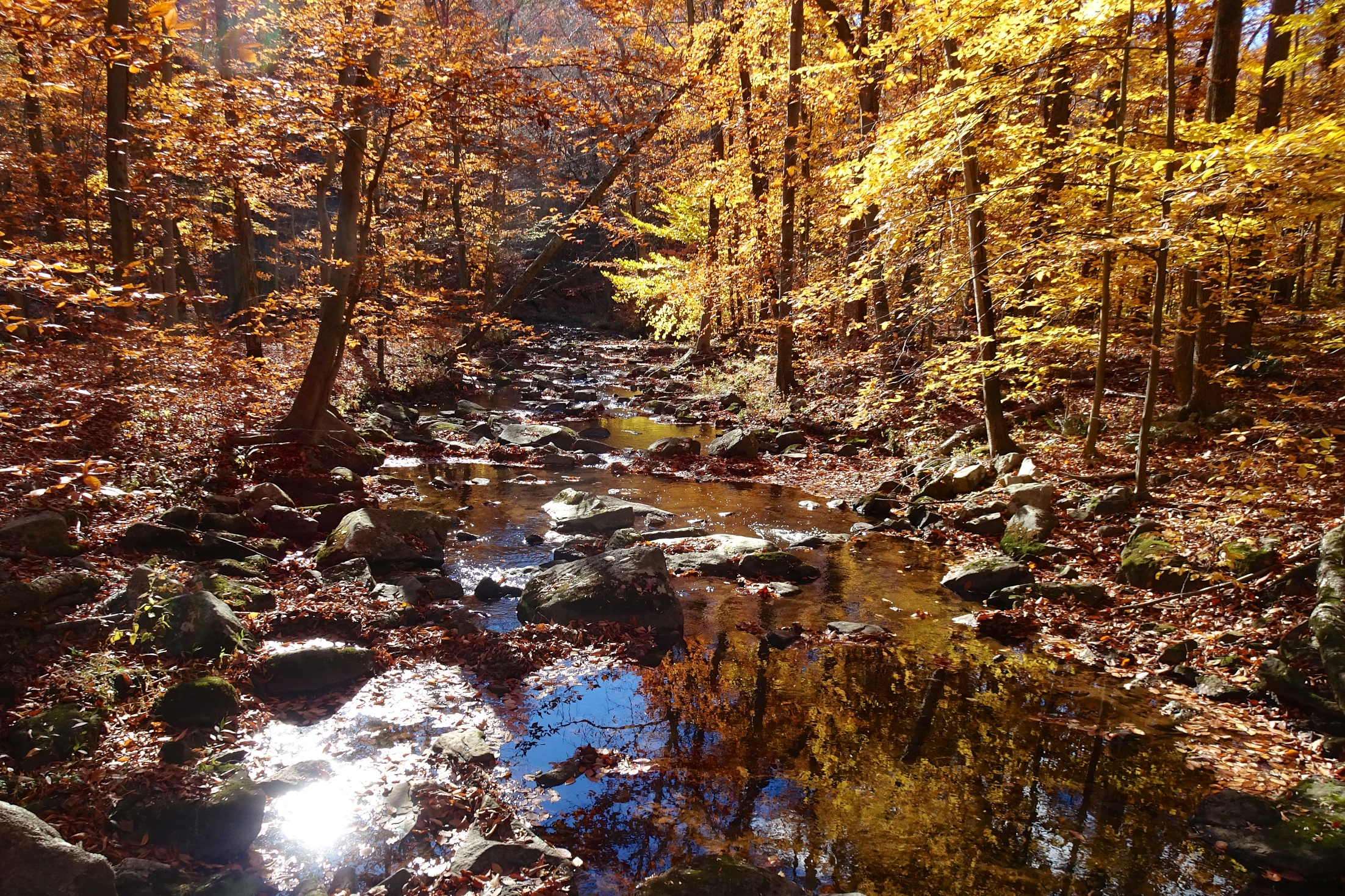
Passaic River from footbridge on the Patriots' Path

== See also ==
- National Register of Historic Places listings in Somerset County, New Jersey
