= Frank M. Williams =

American lawyer, civil engineer and politician

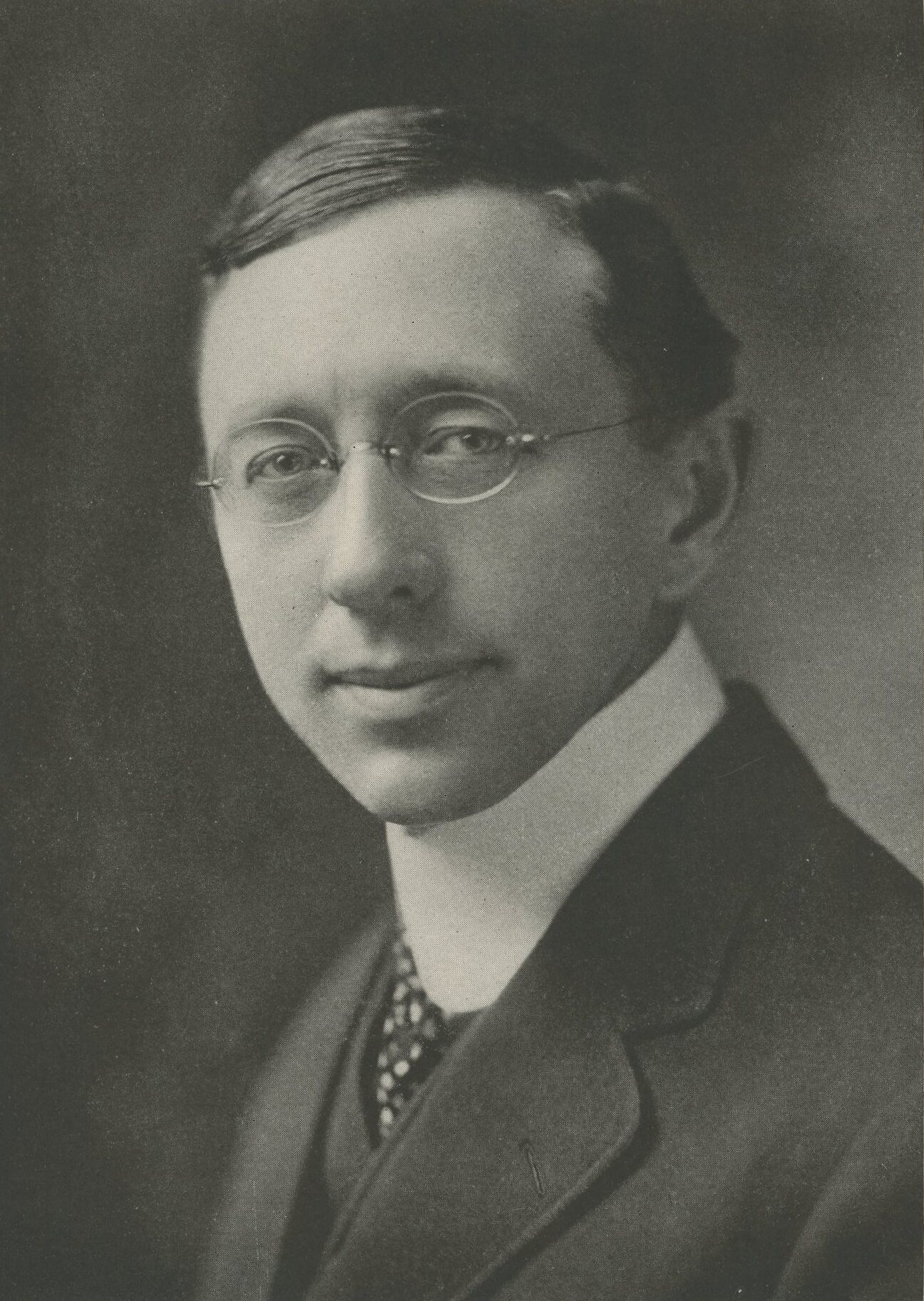
Frank M. Williams

Frank Martin Williams (April 11, 1873 – February 20, 1930) was an American lawyer, civil engineer and politician from New York. He was New York State Engineer and Surveyor from 1909 to 1910, and from 1915 to 1922.

== Biography ==
Williams was born on April 11, 1873, in Durhamville, New York. He graduated from Oneida High School in 1890.

Williams graduated from Colgate University in 1895. Then he studied law at Oneida, New York, graduated from Syracuse University College of Law with an LL.B. degree in 1897, but did not practice. In 1898, he entered the Department of the State Engineer and rose through the ranks up to Resident Engineer.

He was State Engineer and Surveyor from 1909 to 1910, and from 1915 to 1922, elected on the Republican ticket in 1908, defeated for re-election in 1910 and 1912 by Democrat John A. Bensel, and elected again in 1914, 1916, 1918 and 1920.

From 1911 to 1914, he was engaged in the construction of highways in Ohio.

Williams was a member of the American Society of Civil Engineers. In 1915, he was conferred the honorary degree of Doctor of Science by Colgate University. In 1919, he was conferred the honorary degree of Master of Civil Engineering by Syracuse University.

He died on February 20, 1930, in Albany, New York. He was buried at the Glenwood Cemetery in Oneida.

Political offices
Preceded by Frederick Skene	New York State Engineer and Surveyor; 1909–1910	Succeeded by John A. Bensel
Preceded by John A. Bensel	New York State Engineer and Surveyor; 1915–1922	Succeeded by Dwight B. LaDu
