= 1920 United States presidential election in New York =

- November 2, 1920
- Turnout: 56.4% ▼15.2 pp
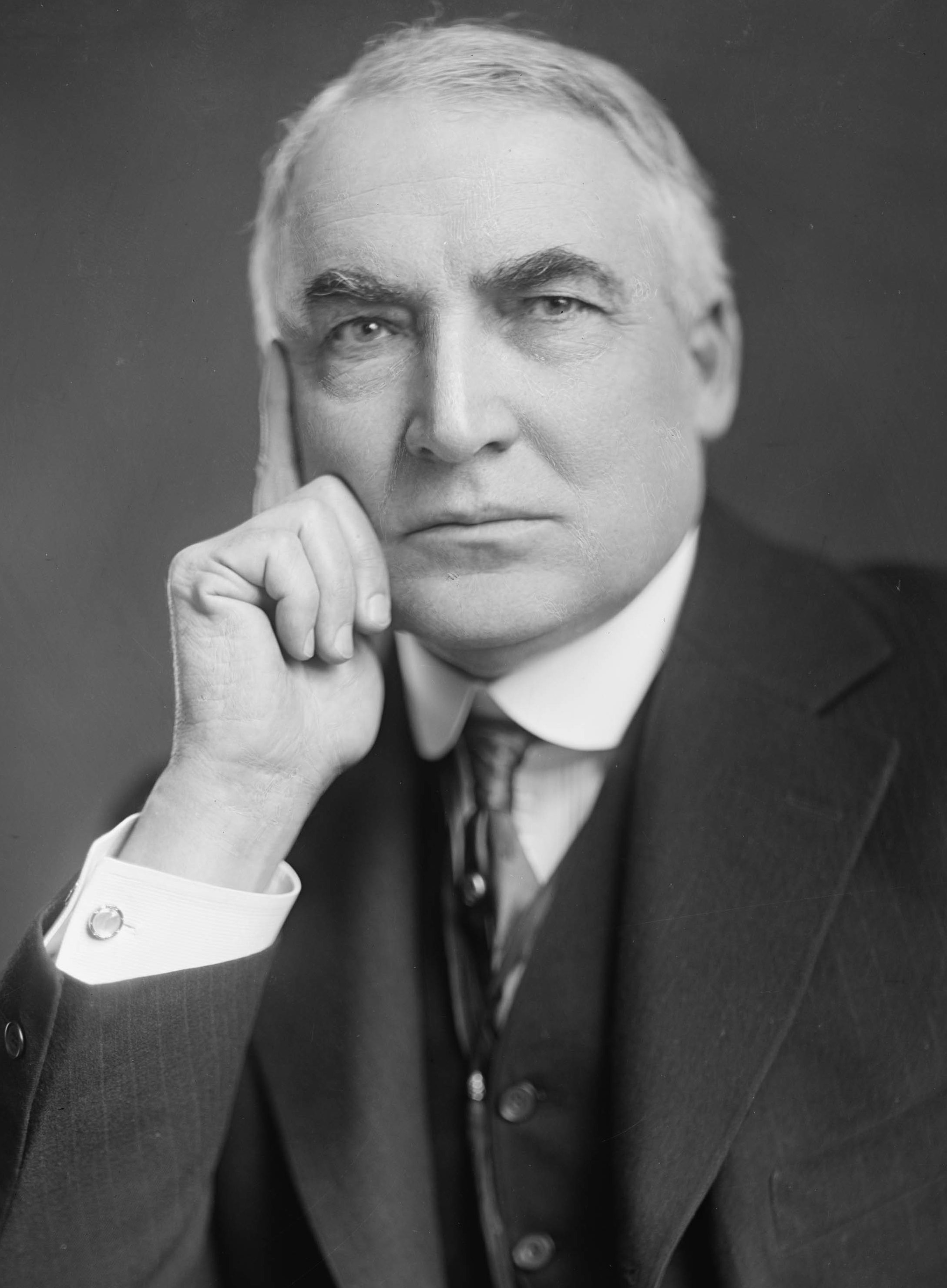

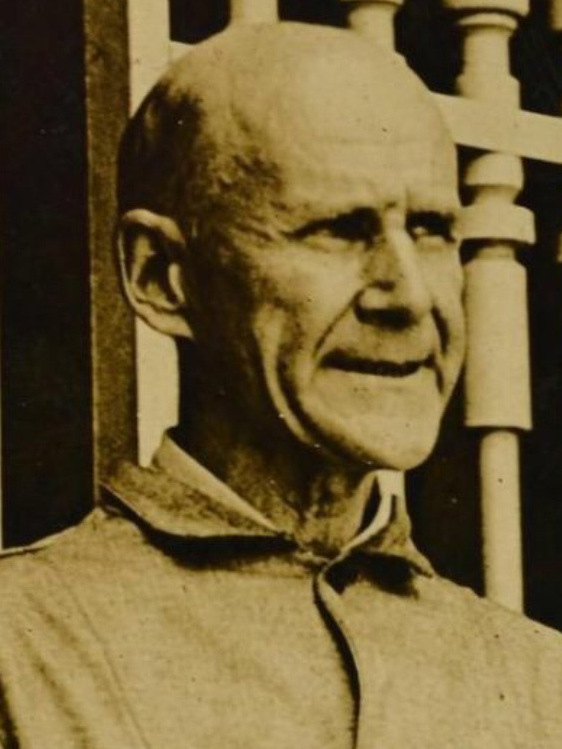
| Nominee | Warren G. Harding | James M. Cox | Eugene V. Debs |
| Party | Republican | Democratic | Socialist |
| Home state | Ohio | Ohio | Indiana |
| Running mate | Calvin Coolidge | Franklin D. Roosevelt | Seymour Stedman |
| Electoral vote | 45 | 0 | 0 |
| Popular vote | 1,871,167 | 781,238 | 203,201 |
| Percentage | 64.56% | 26.95% | 7.01% |
County results
Harding
50–60%
60–70%
70–80%
President before election
Woodrow Wilson
Democratic
Elected President
Warren G. Harding
Republican

The 1920 United States presidential election in New York took place on November 2, 1920. All contemporary 48 states were part of the 1920 United States presidential election. Voters chose 45 electors to the Electoral College, which selected the president and vice president.

New York was won by Republican Senator Warren G. Harding of Ohio, who was running against Democratic Ohio Governor James M. Cox. Harding's running mate was Governor Calvin Coolidge of Massachusetts, while Cox ran with Assistant Secretary of the Navy Franklin D. Roosevelt of New York. Also running that year was Socialist candidate Eugene V. Debs of Indiana and his running mate Seymour Stedman of Illinois.

Harding won New York State with an overwhelming landslide of 64.56% of the vote to Cox's 26.95%, a victory margin of 37.61%. Socialist Party candidate Eugene Debs finished with a relatively strong showing for a third party candidate, taking 7.01% of the vote, more than twice his national vote share, making New York his third strongest state in the nation. The strongest county for Debs within the state was the New York City borough of the Bronx, where Debs broke 15% of the vote.

With the deeply unpopular Democratic administration of Woodrow Wilson as the backdrop for the 1920 campaign, Warren G. Harding promised a "return to normalcy" that appealed to many voters, while Cox was tied to the policies of the Wilson administration, which had even in 1916 been criticized for insensitivity to Irish-American wishes. Harding won nationally in one of the most decisive landslides in American history, and New York, already a fiercely Republican state during the Fourth Party System, went even harder for Harding than the nation, making New York a solid 12% more Republican than the national average. The Irish-Americans were offended by Cox' close ties to Wilson's proposed League of Nations; whilst Palatine Germans who had been the Democratic Party's other base in New York since before the Civil War were similarly offended by Wilson's pro-British policies. Schoharie County, which had been the only New York county to stay Democratic during the "free silver" election of 1896, went Republican for the first time ever and has only twice voted Democratic since. (Note: These were for Lyndon Johnson against Barry Goldwater in 1964 and for Bill Clinton against Bob Dole in 1996.)

== Results ==
1920 United States presidential election in New York
| Party | Candidate | Votes | Percentage | Electoral votes |
|---|---|---|---|---|
| Republican | Warren G. Harding | 1,871,167 | 64.56% | 45 |
| Democratic | James Cox | 781,238 | 26.95% | 0 |
| Socialist | Eugene V. Debs | 203,201 | 7.01% | 0 |
| Prohibition | Aaron S. Watkins | 19,653 | 0.68% | 0 |
| Farmer–Labor | Parley P. Christensen | 18,413 | 0.64% | 0 |
| Socialist Labor | William Wesley Cox | 4,841 | 0.17% | 0 |
| Totals | | 2,898,513 | 100.0% | 45 |

=== New York City results ===
| 1920 Presidential Election in New York City | | Manhattan | The Bronx | Brooklyn | Queens | Staten Island | Total | |
| Republican | Warren G. Harding | 275,013 | 106,050 | 292,692 | 94,360 | 17,844 | 785,959 | 61.42% |
| Republican | Warren G. Harding | 59.22% | 56.61% | 63.32% | 68.71% | 63.15% | 785,959 | 61.42% |
| Democratic | James M. Cox | 135,249 | 45,741 | 119,612 | 35,296 | 9,373 | 345,271 | 26.98% |
| Democratic | James M. Cox | 29.12% | 24.42% | 25.88% | 25.70% | 33.17% | 345,271 | 26.98% |
| Socialist | Eugene V. Debs | 46,049 | 32,923 | 45,100 | 6,143 | 712 | 130,927 | 10.23% |
| Socialist | Eugene V. Debs | 9.92% | 17.57% | 9.76% | 4.47% | 2.52% | 130,927 | 10.23% |
| Farmer–Labor | Parley P. Christensen | 7,079 | 1,949 | 3,473 | 1,204 | 170 | 13,875 | 1.08% |
| Farmer–Labor | Parley P. Christensen | 1.52% | 1.04% | 0.75% | 0.88% | 0.60% | 13,875 | 1.08% |
| Socialist Labor | William W. Cox | 567 | 452 | 638 | 179 | 48 | 1,884 | 0.15% |
| Socialist Labor | William W. Cox | 0.12% | 0.24% | 0.14% | 0.13% | 0.17% | 1,884 | 0.15% |
| Prohibition | Aaron S. Watkins | 463 | 214 | 733 | 142 | 111 | 1,663 | 0.13% |
| Prohibition | Aaron S. Watkins | 0.10% | 0.11% | 0.16% | 0.10% | 0.39% | 1,663 | 0.13% |
| TOTAL | | 464,420 | 187,329 | 462,248 | 137,324 | 28,258 | 1,279,579 | 100.00% |

Map of the results of the 1920 US Presidential Election in NYC

=== Results by county ===
| County | Warren G. Harding Republican | | James M. Cox Democratic | | Eugene V. Debs Socialist | | Aaron Watkins Prohibition | | Parley P. Christensen Farmer–Labor | | William W. Cox Socialist Labor | | Margin | | Total votes cast |
| County | # | % | # | % | # | % | # | % | # | % | # | % | # | % | Total votes cast |
|---|---|---|---|---|---|---|---|---|---|---|---|---|---|---|---|
| Albany | 48,750 | 61.72% | 28,376 | 35.92% | 1,438 | 1.82% | 244 | 0.31% | 118 | 0.15% | 63 | 0.08% | 20,374 | 25.79% | 78,989 |
| Allegany | 10,898 | 74.15% | 2,799 | 19.04% | 513 | 3.49% | 441 | 3.00% | 22 | 0.15% | 24 | 0.16% | 8,099 | 55.11% | 14,697 |
| Bronx | 106,050 | 56.61% | 45,741 | 24.42% | 32,923 | 17.57% | 214 | 0.11% | 1,949 | 1.04% | 452 | 0.24% | 60,309 | 32.19% | 187,329 |
| Broome | 24,759 | 68.96% | 9,251 | 25.77% | 1,120 | 3.12% | 623 | 1.74% | 90 | 0.25% | 60 | 0.17% | 15,508 | 43.19% | 35,903 |
| Cattaraugus | 16,083 | 66.93% | 6,693 | 27.85% | 658 | 2.74% | 481 | 2.00% | 75 | 0.31% | 39 | 0.16% | 9,390 | 39.08% | 24,029 |
| Cayuga | 15,234 | 67.68% | 6,343 | 28.18% | 639 | 2.84% | 191 | 0.85% | 33 | 0.15% | 70 | 0.31% | 8,891 | 39.50% | 22,510 |
| Chautauqua | 27,618 | 71.57% | 6,781 | 17.57% | 3,143 | 8.15% | 869 | 2.25% | 62 | 0.16% | 114 | 0.30% | 20,837 | 54.00% | 38,587 |
| Chemung | 17,864 | 68.53% | 7,060 | 27.08% | 431 | 1.65% | 633 | 2.43% | 46 | 0.18% | 34 | 0.13% | 10,804 | 41.45% | 26,068 |
| Chenango | 10,116 | 71.12% | 3,735 | 26.26% | 68 | 0.48% | 282 | 1.98% | 14 | 0.10% | 9 | 0.06% | 6,381 | 44.86% | 14,224 |
| Clinton | 9,062 | 67.70% | 4,110 | 30.71% | 29 | 0.22% | 166 | 1.24% | 11 | 0.08% | 7 | 0.05% | 4,952 | 37.00% | 13,385 |
| Columbia | 9,284 | 62.63% | 5,203 | 35.10% | 211 | 1.42% | 95 | 0.64% | 15 | 0.10% | 15 | 0.10% | 4,081 | 27.53% | 14,823 |
| Cortland | 9,606 | 76.75% | 2,541 | 20.30% | 136 | 1.09% | 218 | 1.74% | 6 | 0.05% | 9 | 0.07% | 7,065 | 56.45% | 12,516 |
| Delaware | 11,719 | 70.17% | 4,528 | 27.11% | 150 | 0.90% | 269 | 1.61% | 27 | 0.16% | 8 | 0.05% | 7,191 | 43.06% | 16,701 |
| Dutchess | 21,152 | 65.60% | 9,938 | 30.82% | 882 | 2.74% | 167 | 0.52% | 71 | 0.22% | 36 | 0.11% | 11,214 | 34.78% | 32,246 |
| Erie | 99,762 | 63.22% | 40,436 | 25.63% | 15,111 | 9.58% | 1,430 | 0.91% | 521 | 0.33% | 536 | 0.34% | 59,326 | 37.60% | 157,796 |
| Essex | 8,042 | 77.48% | 2,218 | 21.37% | 47 | 0.45% | 61 | 0.59% | 9 | 0.09% | 2 | 0.02% | 5,824 | 56.11% | 10,379 |
| Franklin | 9,786 | 70.58% | 3,825 | 27.59% | 62 | 0.45% | 178 | 1.28% | 12 | 0.09% | 2 | 0.01% | 5,961 | 42.99% | 13,865 |
| Fulton | 10,946 | 70.44% | 3,192 | 20.54% | 888 | 5.71% | 436 | 2.81% | 35 | 0.23% | 42 | 0.27% | 7,754 | 49.90% | 15,539 |
| Genesee | 9,628 | 74.50% | 2,570 | 19.89% | 539 | 4.17% | 152 | 1.18% | 13 | 0.10% | 21 | 0.16% | 7,058 | 54.62% | 12,923 |
| Greene | 6,323 | 61.50% | 3,498 | 34.02% | 264 | 2.57% | 160 | 1.56% | 20 | 0.19% | 17 | 0.17% | 2,825 | 27.48% | 10,282 |
| Hamilton | 881 | 62.66% | 516 | 36.70% | 3 | 0.21% | 4 | 0.28% | 2 | 0.14% | 0 | 0.00% | 365 | 25.96% | 1,406 |
| Herkimer | 14,310 | 65.27% | 6,507 | 29.68% | 793 | 3.62% | 264 | 1.20% | 25 | 0.11% | 25 | 0.11% | 7,803 | 35.59% | 21,924 |
| Jefferson | 22,072 | 70.74% | 7,925 | 25.40% | 252 | 0.81% | 406 | 1.30% | 510 | 1.63% | 36 | 0.12% | 14,147 | 45.34% | 31,201 |
| Kings | 292,692 | 63.32% | 119,612 | 25.88% | 45,100 | 9.76% | 733 | 0.16% | 3,473 | 0.75% | 638 | 0.14% | 173,080 | 37.44% | 462,248 |
| Lewis | 5,906 | 67.95% | 2,673 | 30.75% | 24 | 0.28% | 76 | 0.87% | 10 | 0.12% | 3 | 0.03% | 3,233 | 37.20% | 8,692 |
| Livingston | 9,488 | 68.84% | 3,571 | 25.91% | 497 | 3.61% | 192 | 1.39% | 17 | 0.12% | 18 | 0.13% | 5,917 | 42.93% | 13,783 |
| Madison | 11,094 | 72.28% | 3,797 | 24.74% | 230 | 1.50% | 182 | 1.19% | 22 | 0.14% | 23 | 0.15% | 7,297 | 47.54% | 15,348 |
| Monroe | 73,809 | 63.78% | 28,523 | 24.65% | 11,089 | 9.58% | 1,324 | 1.14% | 678 | 0.59% | 298 | 0.26% | 45,286 | 39.13% | 115,721 |
| Montgomery | 12,835 | 66.07% | 5,911 | 30.43% | 476 | 2.45% | 134 | 0.69% | 26 | 0.13% | 43 | 0.22% | 6,924 | 35.64% | 19,425 |
| Nassau | 33,099 | 76.39% | 8,595 | 19.84% | 1,254 | 2.89% | 155 | 0.36% | 182 | 0.42% | 46 | 0.11% | 24,504 | 56.55% | 43,331 |
| New York | 275,013 | 59.22% | 135,249 | 29.12% | 46,049 | 9.92% | 463 | 0.10% | 7,079 | 1.52% | 567 | 0.12% | 139,764 | 30.09% | 464,420 |
| Niagara | 21,193 | 68.29% | 7,416 | 23.90% | 1,872 | 6.03% | 380 | 1.22% | 104 | 0.34% | 67 | 0.22% | 13,777 | 44.40% | 31,032 |
| Oneida | 36,311 | 66.27% | 15,560 | 28.40% | 2,297 | 4.19% | 412 | 0.75% | 78 | 0.14% | 133 | 0.24% | 20,751 | 37.87% | 54,791 |
| Onondaga | 57,008 | 66.25% | 23,308 | 27.09% | 4,707 | 5.47% | 640 | 0.74% | 163 | 0.19% | 221 | 0.26% | 33,700 | 39.16% | 86,047 |
| Ontario | 13,361 | 66.20% | 5,678 | 28.13% | 914 | 4.53% | 186 | 0.92% | 24 | 0.12% | 21 | 0.10% | 7,683 | 38.06% | 20,184 |
| Orange | 24,558 | 66.13% | 10,567 | 28.46% | 1,573 | 4.24% | 292 | 0.79% | 93 | 0.25% | 52 | 0.14% | 13,991 | 37.68% | 37,135 |
| Orleans | 8,305 | 72.79% | 2,266 | 19.86% | 620 | 5.43% | 176 | 1.54% | 30 | 0.26% | 13 | 0.11% | 6,039 | 52.93% | 11,410 |
| Oswego | 17,905 | 66.37% | 8,045 | 29.82% | 491 | 1.82% | 474 | 1.76% | 36 | 0.13% | 28 | 0.10% | 9,860 | 36.55% | 26,979 |
| Otsego | 12,112 | 63.88% | 6,275 | 33.09% | 134 | 0.71% | 391 | 2.06% | 36 | 0.19% | 13 | 0.07% | 5,837 | 30.78% | 18,961 |
| Putnam | 3,447 | 70.19% | 1,405 | 28.61% | 23 | 0.47% | 20 | 0.41% | 8 | 0.16% | 8 | 0.16% | 2,042 | 41.58% | 4,911 |
| Queens | 94,360 | 68.71% | 35,296 | 25.70% | 6,143 | 4.47% | 142 | 0.10% | 1,204 | 0.88% | 179 | 0.13% | 59,064 | 43.01% | 137,324 |
| Rensselaer | 28,810 | 56.08% | 20,224 | 39.37% | 1,849 | 3.60% | 278 | 0.54% | 116 | 0.23% | 94 | 0.18% | 8,586 | 16.71% | 51,371 |
| Richmond | 17,844 | 63.15% | 9,373 | 33.17% | 712 | 2.52% | 111 | 0.39% | 170 | 0.60% | 48 | 0.17% | 8,471 | 29.98% | 28,258 |
| Rockland | 11,169 | 66.10% | 5,057 | 29.93% | 498 | 2.95% | 80 | 0.47% | 67 | 0.40% | 26 | 0.15% | 6,112 | 36.17% | 16,897 |
| Saratoga | 16,222 | 67.99% | 6,905 | 28.94% | 351 | 1.47% | 290 | 1.22% | 73 | 0.31% | 17 | 0.07% | 9,317 | 39.05% | 23,858 |
| Schenectady | 19,208 | 57.20% | 8,741 | 26.03% | 4,941 | 14.71% | 509 | 1.52% | 66 | 0.20% | 117 | 0.35% | 10,467 | 31.17% | 33,582 |
| Schoharie | 5,572 | 58.43% | 3,697 | 38.76% | 30 | 0.31% | 215 | 2.25% | 12 | 0.13% | 11 | 0.12% | 1,875 | 19.66% | 9,537 |
| Schuyler | 3,827 | 71.29% | 1,231 | 22.93% | 151 | 2.81% | 138 | 2.57% | 9 | 0.17% | 12 | 0.22% | 2,596 | 48.36% | 5,368 |
| Seneca | 6,260 | 64.56% | 3,023 | 31.18% | 250 | 2.58% | 135 | 1.39% | 12 | 0.12% | 16 | 0.17% | 3,237 | 33.38% | 9,696 |
| St. Lawrence | 24,651 | 75.60% | 7,213 | 22.12% | 372 | 1.14% | 282 | 0.86% | 56 | 0.17% | 32 | 0.10% | 17,438 | 53.48% | 32,606 |
| Steuben | 18,335 | 65.79% | 7,401 | 26.56% | 1,217 | 4.37% | 784 | 2.81% | 52 | 0.19% | 79 | 0.28% | 10,934 | 39.23% | 27,868 |
| Suffolk | 26,737 | 73.10% | 8,852 | 24.20% | 596 | 1.63% | 233 | 0.64% | 118 | 0.32% | 38 | 0.10% | 17,885 | 48.90% | 36,574 |
| Sullivan | 8,029 | 64.45% | 3,623 | 29.08% | 671 | 5.39% | 98 | 0.79% | 26 | 0.21% | 11 | 0.09% | 4,406 | 35.37% | 12,458 |
| Tioga | 6,772 | 71.20% | 2,406 | 25.30% | 83 | 0.87% | 223 | 2.34% | 16 | 0.17% | 11 | 0.12% | 4,366 | 45.90% | 9,511 |
| Tompkins | 9,508 | 70.05% | 3,487 | 25.69% | 288 | 2.12% | 250 | 1.84% | 21 | 0.15% | 19 | 0.14% | 6,021 | 44.36% | 13,573 |
| Ulster | 19,001 | 66.41% | 8,759 | 30.61% | 301 | 1.05% | 455 | 1.59% | 76 | 0.27% | 20 | 0.07% | 10,242 | 35.80% | 28,612 |
| Warren | 9,009 | 71.76% | 3,227 | 25.70% | 189 | 1.51% | 101 | 0.80% | 20 | 0.16% | 9 | 0.07% | 5,782 | 46.05% | 12,555 |
| Washington | 13,647 | 75.43% | 4,124 | 22.79% | 162 | 0.90% | 123 | 0.68% | 24 | 0.13% | 13 | 0.07% | 9,523 | 52.63% | 18,093 |
| Wayne | 13,333 | 73.24% | 4,289 | 23.56% | 304 | 1.67% | 241 | 1.32% | 18 | 0.10% | 20 | 0.11% | 9,044 | 49.68% | 18,205 |
| Westchester | 76,020 | 68.28% | 28,060 | 25.20% | 6,097 | 5.48% | 435 | 0.39% | 485 | 0.44% | 238 | 0.21% | 47,960 | 43.08% | 111,335 |
| Wyoming | 9,134 | 75.48% | 2,442 | 20.18% | 294 | 2.43% | 194 | 1.60% | 21 | 0.17% | 16 | 0.13% | 6,692 | 55.30% | 12,101 |
| Yates | 5,638 | 76.28% | 1,571 | 21.26% | 52 | 0.70% | 122 | 1.65% | 6 | 0.08% | 2 | 0.03% | 4,067 | 55.03% | 7,391 |
| Totals | 1,871,167 | 64.56% | 781,238 | 26.95% | 203,201 | 7.01% | 19,653 | 0.68% | 18,413 | 0.64% | 4,841 | 0.17% | 1,089,929 | 37.60% | 2,898,513 |

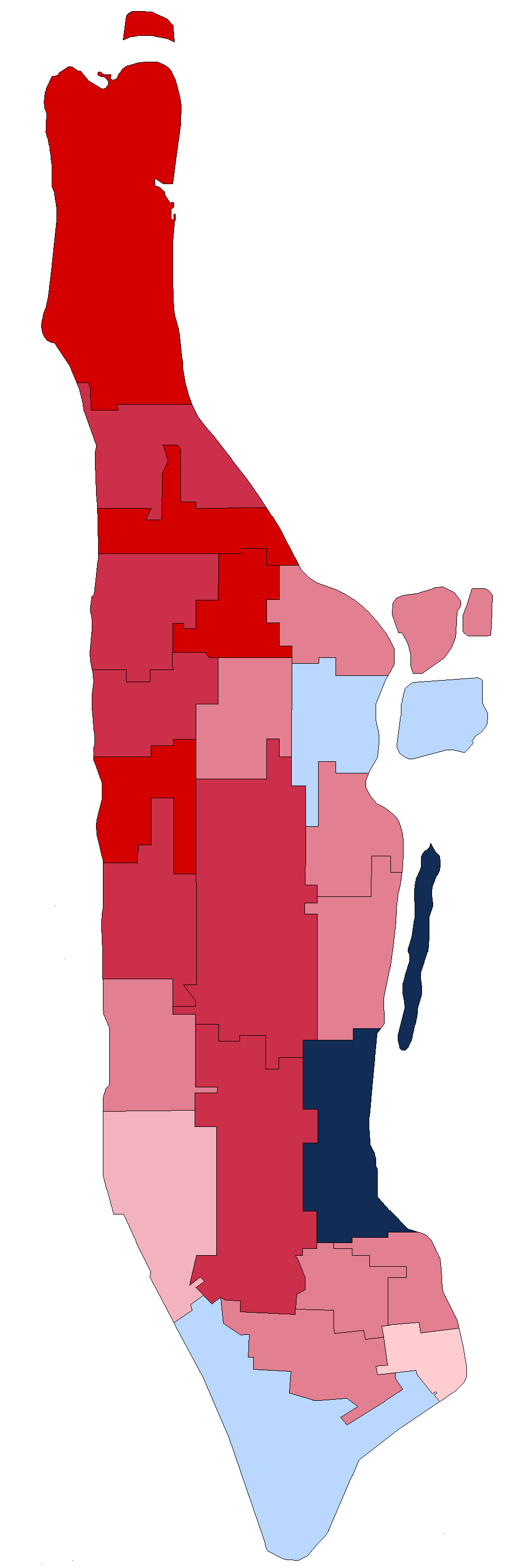
Results by Manhattan assembly district. Colors are as above with the following additions: Harding—30-40% Cox—40-50% Cox—80-90%

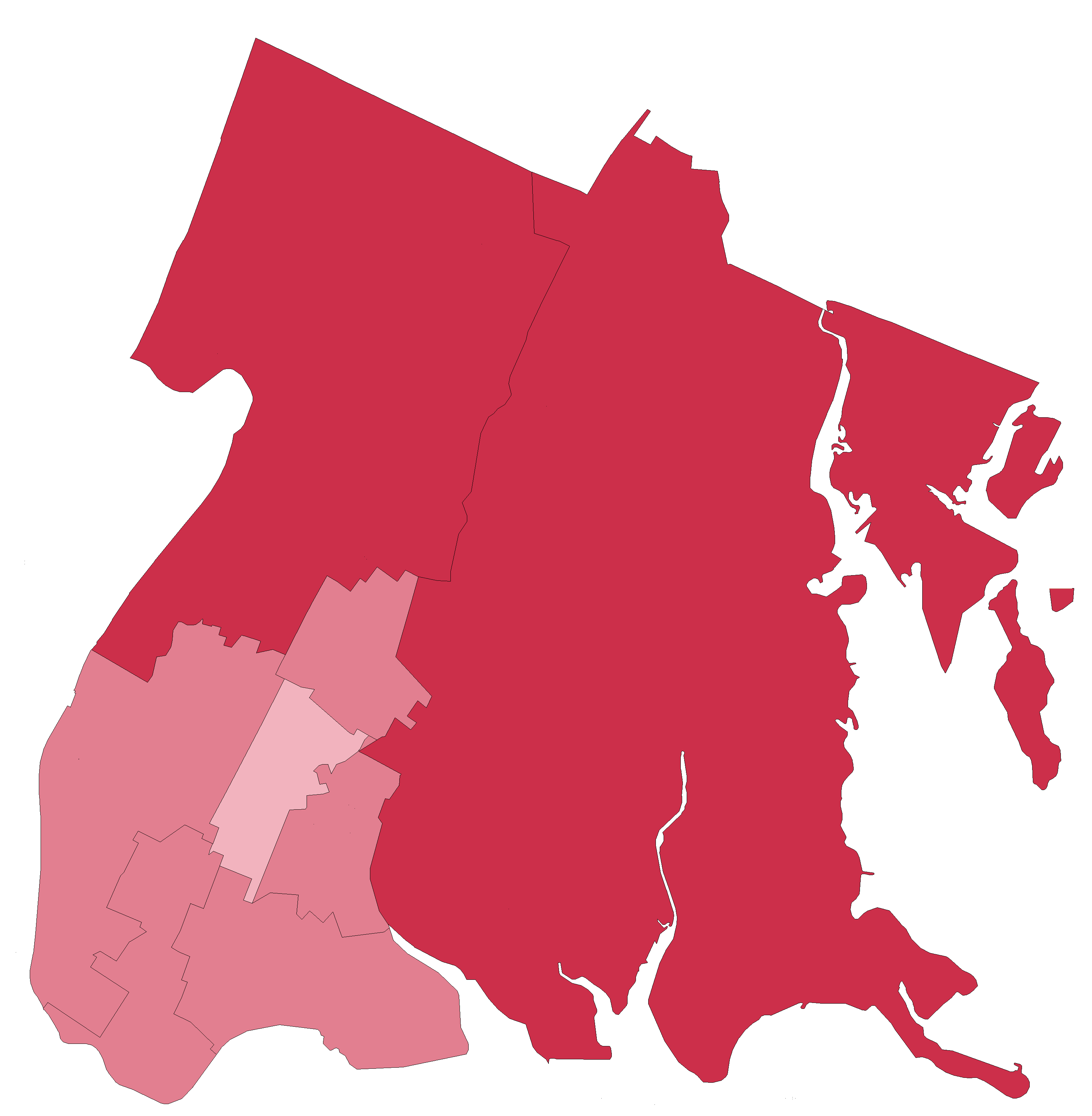
Results by Bronx assembly district.

==== Counties that flipped from Democratic to Republican ====
- Bronx
- Chemung
- Hamilton
- Kings
- New York
- Otsego
- Richmond
- Schoharie

== Analysis ==
Harding swept every county in the state of New York, winning every upstate county as well as winning all five boroughs of New York City and Long Island. All but five of New York State's 62 counties went Republican with more than 60% of the vote.

Harding won heavily populated New York City as a whole with a commanding majority, sweeping all 5 boroughs. Harding received over 60% of the vote in the boroughs of Brooklyn, Queens, and Staten Island, and also won majorities in Manhattan and the Bronx. 1920 was the first of only two occasions in which a Republican presidential candidate won all 5 boroughs of New York City since the city's incorporation in 1898, the other occasion being 1924. 1920 remains the only election ever in which a Republican presidential candidate has won an absolute majority of the vote in all five boroughs as well as in New York City as a whole. In 1924, Calvin Coolidge would win every borough of New York City for the GOP once more, but with mere pluralities in every borough sans Queens. This is the second of three elections in which Republicans won New York City as a whole since consolidation (along with 1908 and 1924).

Likewise, this was the first of only two occasions (the other being 1924) in which a Republican has won the boroughs of Manhattan and the Bronx since they took their modern forms with the creation of Bronx County in 1914.

Harding also won decisive majorities in upstate New York in rural and urban counties. Harding won over 60% in Albany County, home to the state capital of Albany, as well as in Erie County, home to the city of Buffalo, and in Monroe County, home to the city of Rochester. Warren G. Harding was the first of three presidential candidates of either party who has been able to sweep every county in New York State, the only others being Republican Calvin Coolidge in 1924 and Democrat Lyndon Johnson in 1964. As of 2024, this is the most recent election where New York's most Democratic county was not one of the five boroughs of New York City, as Cox had his best performance in Upstate Rensselaer County.

Harding's 64.56% of the vote in New York State remains the highest vote share any Republican presidential candidate has ever received in the state, and the second-highest vote share any candidate of either party has ever gotten in the state, beaten only by Democrat Lyndon Johnson's 68.56% in the Democratic landslide of 1964. Harding's landslide victory margin of 37.61% remains the widest margin by which any candidate of either party has ever won New York State, beating even Lyndon Johnson's 37.25% in 1964.

== See also ==
- United States presidential elections in New York
- Presidency of Warren G. Harding
- Presidency of Calvin Coolidge
