= Jonas Platt Goodsell =

American civil engineer and politician

Jonas Platt Goodsell (1819 – November 22, 1869) was an American civil engineer and politician from New York. He was New York State Engineer and Surveyor from 1866 to 1867.

== Life ==
He was born in 1819 in Utica, New York, the son of Dr. Thomas Goodsell (1775–1864) and Susan (Livingston) Goodsell (c. 1797 – 1864). He was educated at the Utica Academy.

He began work on the survey for the enlargement of the Erie Canal in 1840, and continued there until 1842. Then he removed to Mobile, Alabama, to improve his health, and staid there until 1844. On November 27, 1845, he married Lavinia Maria Smith at Durhamville.

He was appointed Second Assistant Engineer of the State Canals in 1846, and from 1850 to 1853 was Resident Engineer at Albany, New York. From 1853 to 1856, he was Chief Engineer of the Cape Fear and Deep River Railroad in North Carolina. From 1856 to 1860, he was Division Engineer of the Eastern Division, and from 1862 to 1866 of the Middle Division of the New York State Canals. In 1863 and 1864, he was Supervisor of the Town of Utica. He was State Engineer and Surveyor from 1866 to 1867, elected in 1865 on the Republican ticket, defeating Democrat Sylvanus H. Sweet.

Goodsell died on November 22, 1869, in Durhamville, New York.

== Sources ==
- Engineer's bios, at Rochester history
- Political Graveyard
- Livingston family tree
- Life Sketches of State Officers, Senators, and Members of Assembly in the State of New York in 1867 by S. R. Harlow and H. H. Boone (pages 43ff; Weed, Parsons & Co., Albany NY, 1867)

Political offices
Preceded by William B. Taylor	New York State Engineer and Surveyor; 1866 - 1867	Succeeded by Van Rensselaer Richmond
