= Roy G. Finch =

American engineer (1884–1959)

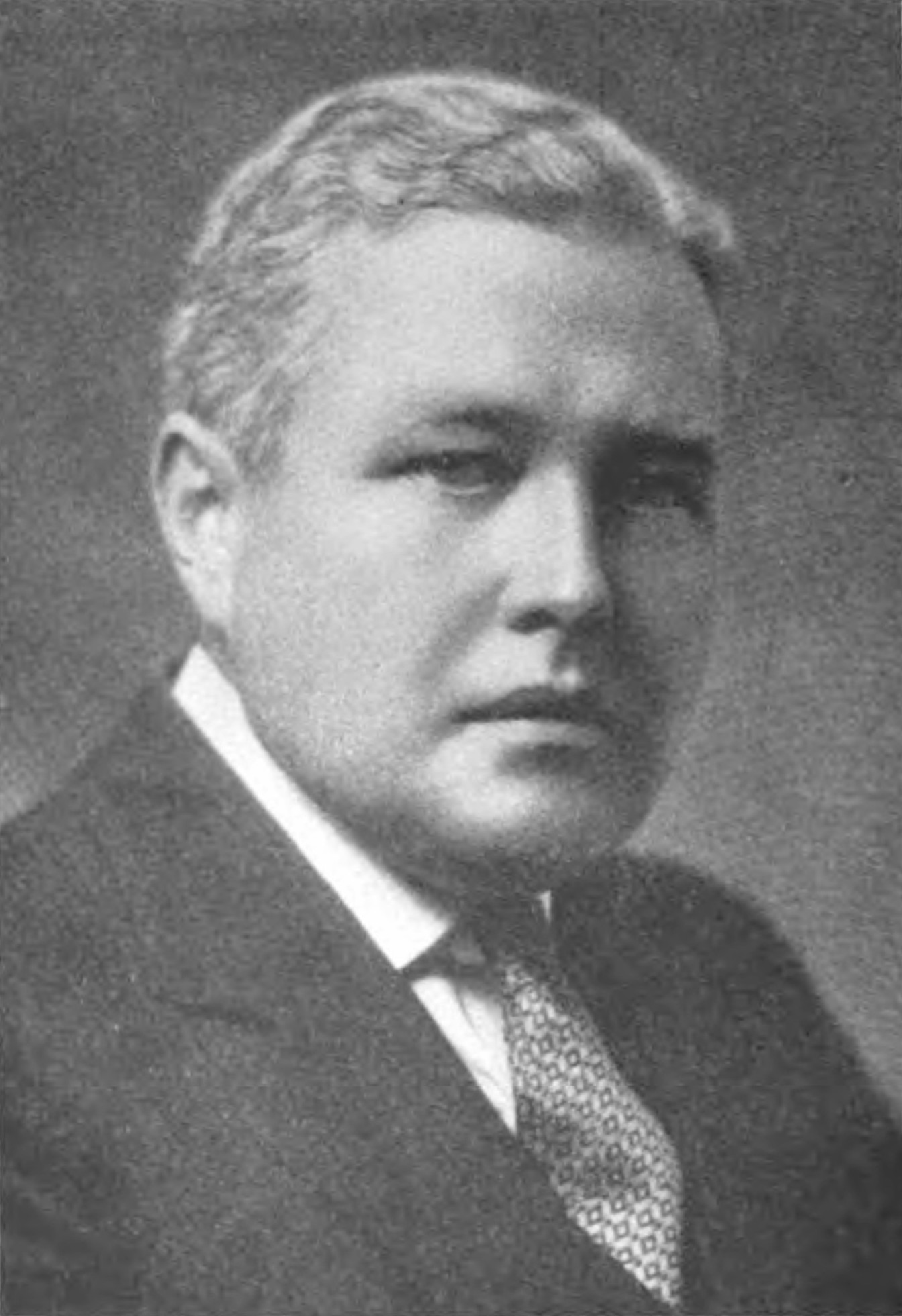
- Born: Royal George Finch; August 17, 1884; Eagle Bridge, New York, US
- Died: March 4, 1959 (aged 74); Albany, New York, US
- Education: Rensselaer Polytechnic Institute
- Title: New York State Engineer and Surveyor
- Term: 1925 to 1926
- Predecessor: Dwight B. LaDu
- Successor: Superintendent of Public Works
- Spouse: Jessie Lewis Weller (m. 1909)
- Parent(s): George Nelson Finch; Helen Hunt

Signature
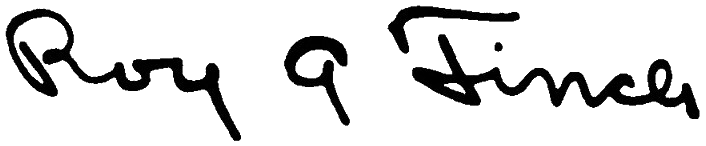

Royal George Finch (August 17, 1884 – March 4, 1959) was an American civil engineer and politician from New York. He was the last New York State Engineer and Surveyor, in office from 1925 to 1926. He was a member of the New York State licensing board for engineers.

== Early life ==
Finch was born on August 17, 1884, in Eagle Bridge, New York to George Nelson Finch and Helen (née Hunt) Finch. He attended the public schools of Granville, New York. He graduated in 1906 from Rensselaer Polytechnic Institute with a degree in civil engineering. While there, he joined Delta Kappa Epsilon.

== Career ==
In 1908, Finch joined what was then the New York Department of Engineering and was subsequently promoted to chief clerk of the New York State Engineer and Surveyor office. In 1919 was appointed deputy state engineer to replace William B. Landreth. Finch was the chief engineer for several bridges in New York State, including the Troy-Cohoes Bridge, also known as the 112th Street Bridge.

In 1922, Finch worked for Norton Stone and Lime in Cobleskill, New York. He formed a private practice in 1923 and successfully ran for a state office in 1924. Finch was New York State Engineer and Surveyor from 1925 to 1926, elected on the Republican ticket in 1924. In 1925, he published The Story of the New York State Canals: Historical and Commercial Information. By 1926 he was a member of the New York State Water Power Commission.

In 1926, Democratic Governor Al Smith undertook a major re-organisation of the state administration, and the Engineer and Surveyor's Department was abolished, with its duties taken over by the New York State Department of Public Works. Finch returned to private practice, working as a consulting engineer. From 1928 to 1946, Finch was a member and secretary of the State Board of Examiners for Professional Engineers and Land Surveyors.

In 1929, Finch was awarded the Arthur M. Wellington prize for his pamphlet on the Story of the New York State Barge Canal and Its Operation. On April 30, 1930, President Herbert Hoover appointed Finch to the Interoceanic Canal Board. Finch served on the Albany Board of Education from 1947 to 1952, when he resigned.

== Personal life ==
On October 19, 1909, Finch married Jessie Lewis Weller. They had one daughter, Mary Lewis Finch, born June 9, 1912, in Albany, New York.

In 1931, Finch a trustee of Rensselaer Polytechnic Institute; he became vice president in 1950 and continued serving until resigning. In November 1950, he was appointed to the RPI Athletic Council, a ten-man council created in recognition of the important part played by athletics in the training of the well-rounded engineer. He was also a president of the Rensselaer Polytechnic Institute Alumni Council. He was a member of the Wadsworth Lodge of the Free and Accepted Masons. He belonged to St. Andrew's Episcopal Church of Albany.

Finch died on March 4, 1959, in Albany, New York. He was buried in Mettowee Valley Cemetery in Granville, New York.

Political offices
Preceded by Dwight B. LaDu	New York State Engineer and Surveyor; 1925–1926	Succeeded by Frederick S. Greene as Superintendent of Public Works
