= Van Rensselaer Richmond =

American civil engineer and politician

Van Rensselaer Richmond (January 1812 in Preston, Chenango County, New York – November 20, 1883 in Lyons, Wayne County, New York) was an American civil engineer and politician from New York.

== Life ==
He was the son of Oliver Richmond (died 1853). He was educated at the Oxford Academy, and in 1834 began work as a chainman at the construction of the Chenango Canal. In 1837 he married Anna A. Dennison (died 1854), and they had four children.

In 1837, he was appointed resident engineer of the Erie Canal at Lyons, New York. In 1842, he was appointed division engineer of the Middle Division of the State Canals at Syracuse. In 1848, he resigned and began to work for the Oswego and Syracuse Railroad, but soon after returned to canal work as chief engineer of the construction of the canal from Jordan, New York to the Cayuga Marshes. In 1850 he left the canal works and became division engineer of the Rochester and Syracuse Railroad. In 1852, he was appointed again division engineer of the Middle Division of the State Canals by William J. McAlpine, was maintained in office by Whig state engineer John T. Clark, but was removed in 1856 by the American Party majority of the Canal Board.

He was New York State Engineer and Surveyor from 1858 to 1861, and from 1868 to 1871, elected four times on the Democratic ticket.

He died from a "sudden stroke of apoplexy." on November 20, 1883 in Lyons, New York.

His son Dennison Richmond (c. 1842–1888) was also division engineer of the Middle Division.

He is remembered with the Richmond aqueduct, another name for the Montezuma aqueduct that carried the Erie Canal above the Seneca River. Built between 1849 and 1857, it was the second-longest aqueduct of the canal at 840 feet et 5 1/2 inches; it was abandoned in 1917 with the construction of the third generation of the Erie Canal, that used the Seneca river here instead of a canal.

Political offices
Preceded by Silas Seymour	New York State Engineer and Surveyor; 1858–1861	Succeeded by William B. Taylor
Preceded by J. Platt Goodsell	New York State Engineer and Surveyor; 1868–1871	Succeeded by William B. Taylor
