= William B. Taylor (engineer) =

American civil engineer and politician (1824–1895)

William Burdick Taylor (February 27, 1824 – February 1, 1895) was an American civil engineer and politician from New York.

== Life ==
He was born on February 27, 1824, in Manchester, Ontario County, New York.

He was educated at Utica, New York, and studied engineering in his brother's office. He began work as a leveler on the Erie Canal in 1848, became Second Assistant Engineer in 1850, First Assistant in 1852, Resident Engineer in 1854, and from 1860 to 1862 he was Division Engineer of the Eastern Division of the State Canals.

He was New York State Engineer and Surveyor from 1862 to 1865, elected on Union tickets nominated by Republicans and War Democrats in 1861 and 1863. In 1869, he ran again but was defeated by Democrat Van Rensselaer Richmond. He was again State Engineer and Surveyor from 1872 to 1873, elected on the Republican ticket in 1871.

He was elected as a member of the American Philosophical Society in 1877.

He also served two terms as City Surveyor of Utica, New York.

He died on February 1, 1895.

== Sources ==
- Political Graveyard
- Engineers bios, at Rochester history
- Rep. state ticket in NYT on October 31, 1871

Political offices
Preceded by Van Rensselaer Richmond	New York State Engineer and Surveyor; 1862 - 1865	Succeeded by Jonas Platt Goodsell
Preceded by Van Rensselaer Richmond	New York State Engineer and Surveyor; 1872 - 1873	Succeeded by Sylvanus H. Sweet
