= 1924 United States presidential election in New York =

- November 4, 1924
- Turnout: 56.3% ▼0.1 pp

Nominee	Calvin Coolidge	John W. Davis	Robert M. La Follette
Party	Republican	Democratic	Socialist
Alliance			Progressive
Home state	Massachusetts	West Virginia	Wisconsin
Running mate	Charles G. Dawes	Charles W. Bryan	Burton K. Wheeler
Electoral vote	45	0	0
Popular vote	1,820,058	950,796	474,913
Percentage	55.76%	29.13%	14.55%
County results
Coolidge
30–40%
40–50%
50–60%
60–70%
70–80%
President before election
Calvin Coolidge
Republican
Elected President
Calvin Coolidge
Republican

The 1924 United States presidential election in New York took place on November 4, 1924. All contemporary 48 states were part of the 1924 United States presidential election. Voters chose 45 electors to the Electoral College, which selected the president and vice president.

New York was won by incumbent Republican President Calvin Coolidge of Massachusetts, who was running against Democratic Ambassador John W. Davis of West Virginia and the Progressive Party's Senator Robert M. La Follette of Wisconsin. Coolidge's running mate was former Budget Director Charles G. Dawes of Illinois and Davis ran with Governor Charles W. Bryan of Nebraska, while La Follette ran with Senator Burton K. Wheeler of Montana.

In a three-way race, Coolidge won with a decisive majority of 55.76% of the vote to Davis' 29.13% and La Follette's 14.55%, a victory margin of 26.63%. In the midst of a nationwide Republican landslide, New York's results in this election made the state about 2% more Republican than the national average. Support for Robert La Follette was strongest in the New York City area, where he took double-digit support, and even broke 20% in the boroughs of Brooklyn and the Bronx. La Follette also broke 20% in upstate Monroe County, home to the city of Rochester. La Follette got the majority of his votes in New York state under the Socialist label (268,518 votes) than under the Progressive label (206,395 votes), for a combined total of 474,913 votes.

Coolidge got 1,820,058 votes in the state of New York, swept every county in the state, winning every upstate county as well as sweeping all 5 boroughs of New York City, the last time a Republican presidential candidate has done so.

The 1920s were a fiercely Republican decade in American politics, and New York during the Fourth Party System was a Republican-leaning state in presidential elections. The economic boom and social good feelings of the Roaring Twenties under popular Republican leadership virtually guaranteed Calvin Coolidge an easy win in the state against the conservative Southern Democrat John Davis, who had little appeal in Northern states like New York where large Catholic populations opposed his reticence on the anti-Catholic Ku Klux Klan. Coolidge won a strong majority statewide even with the Republican vote being split by the strong third party candidacy of Robert La Follette, a Republican Senator who had run as the Progressive Party candidate and peeled away the votes of many progressive Republicans.

== Results ==
1924 United States presidential election in New York
Party	Candidate	Votes	Percentage	Electoral votes
Republican	Calvin Coolidge (incumbent)	1,820,058	55.76%	45
Democratic	John W. Davis	950,796	29.13%	0
Socialist	Robert M. La Follette	268,518	8.23%	
Progressive	Robert M. La Follette	206,395	6.32%	
Total	Robert M. La Follette	474,913	14.55%	0
Socialist Labor	Frank T. Johns	9,928	0.30%	0
Communist	William Z. Foster	8,244	0.25%	0
Totals		3,263,939	100.0%	45

=== New York City results ===
1924 Presidential Election in New York City		Manhattan	The Bronx	Brooklyn	Queens	Staten Island	Total	
Republican	Calvin Coolidge	190,871	79,583	236,877	100,793	18,007	626,131	44.58%
Republican	Calvin Coolidge	41.20%	36.73%	47.50%	53.57%	47.91%	626,131	44.58%
Democratic	John W. Davis	183,249	72,840	158,907	58,402	15,801	489,199	34.83%
Democratic	John W. Davis	39.55%	33.62%	31.87%	31.04%	42.04%	489,199	34.83%
Socialist/Progressive	Robert M. La Follette	86,625	62,212	100,721	28,210	3,702	281,470	20.04%
Socialist/Progressive	Robert M. La Follette	18.70%	28.71%	20.20%	14.99%	9.85%	281,470	20.04%
Communist	William Z. Foster	1,858	1,410	1,530	547	44	5,389	0.38%
Communist	William Z. Foster	0.40%	0.65%	0.31%	0.29%	0.12%	5,389	0.38%
Socialist Labor	Frank T. Johns	723	612	652	217	32	2,236	0.16%
Socialist Labor	Frank T. Johns	0.16%	0.28%	0.13%	0.12%	0.09%	2,236	0.16%
TOTAL		463,326	216,657	498,687	188,169	37,586	1,404,425	100.00%

=== Results by county ===
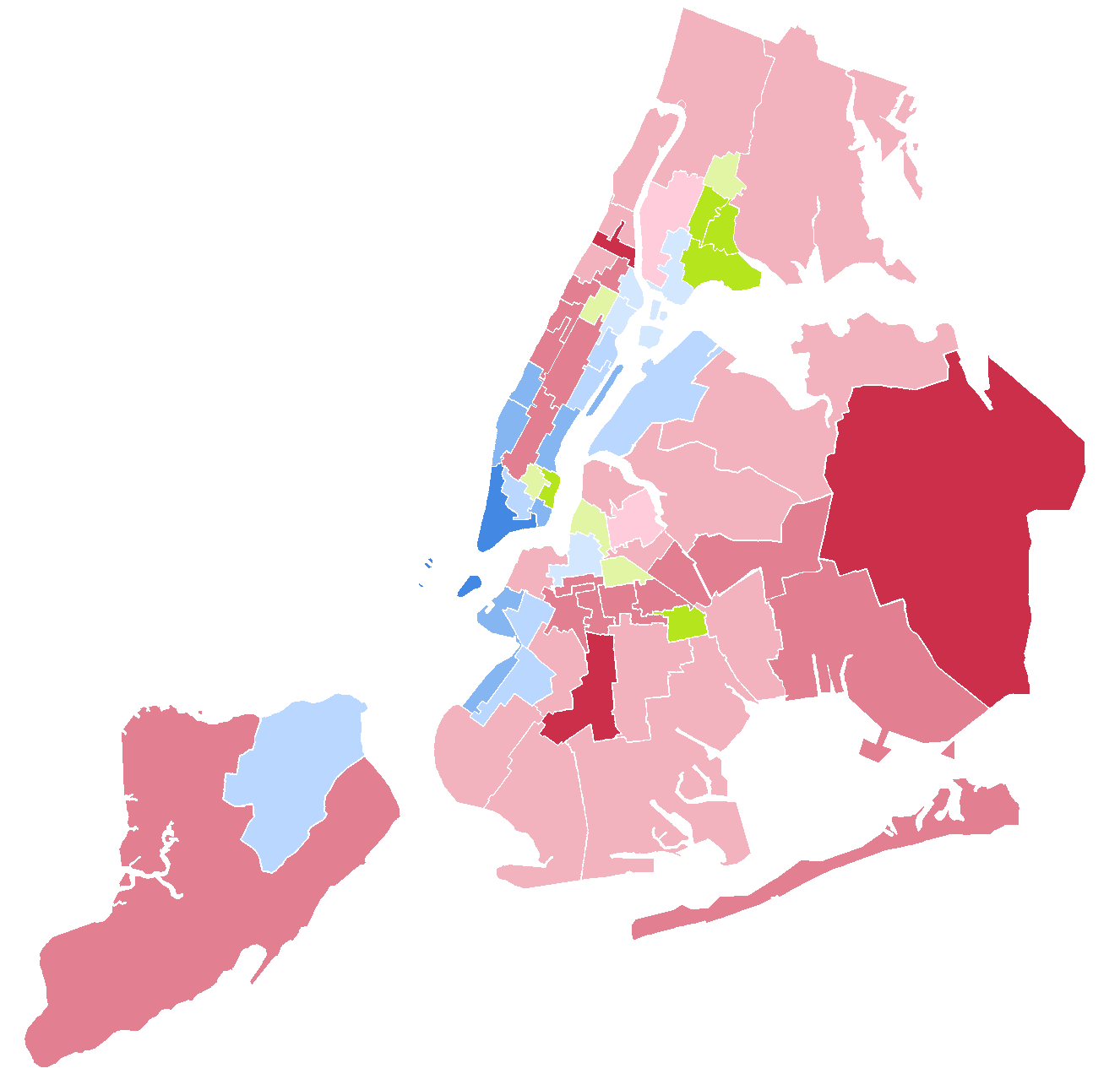
Results by New York City assembly district. Colors are as above with the following added: Davis—30-40% Davis—40-50% Davis—50-60% Davis—60-70% La Follette—30-40% La Follette—40-50%

County	John Calvin Coolidge Republican		John William Davis Democratic		Robert M. La Follette Socialist/Progressive		Frank Tetes Johns Socialist Labor		William Z. Foster Communist		Margin		Total votes cast
County	#	%	#	%	#	%	#	%	#	%	#	%	Total votes cast
Albany	48,253	52.01%	38,671	41.68%	5,736	6.18%	71	0.08%	41	0.04%	9,582	10.33%	92,772
Allegany	12,203	75.35%	2,755	17.01%	1,202	7.42%	24	0.15%	12	0.07%	9,448	58.34%	16,196
Bronx	79,583	36.73%	72,840	33.62%	62,212	28.71%	612	0.28%	1,410	0.65%	6,743	3.11%	216,657
Broome	28,262	67.70%	9,289	22.25%	3,994	9.57%	133	0.32%	71	0.17%	18,973	45.45%	41,749
Cattaraugus	17,307	63.94%	5,369	19.84%	4,200	15.52%	138	0.51%	52	0.19%	11,938	44.11%	27,066
Cayuga	17,252	63.66%	7,369	27.19%	2,296	8.47%	107	0.39%	76	0.28%	9,883	36.47%	27,100
Chautauqua	29,757	71.25%	5,560	13.31%	5,995	14.35%	313	0.75%	139	0.33%	23,762 (Note: In this county where La Follette ran second ahead of Davis, the margin given is that between Coolidge and La Follette and percentage margin Coolidge percentage minus La Follette percentage.)	56.90%	41,764
Chemung	18,599	64.66%	7,162	24.90%	2,972	10.33%	18	0.06%	14	0.05%	11,437	39.76%	28,765
Chenango	11,323	72.60%	3,392	21.75%	841	5.39%	31	0.20%	9	0.06%	7,931	50.85%	15,596
Clinton	7,918	57.80%	5,138	37.51%	625	4.56%	15	0.11%	2	0.01%	2,780	20.29%	13,698
Columbia	10,774	63.70%	5,466	32.32%	623	3.68%	39	0.23%	12	0.07%	5,308	31.38%	16,914
Cortland	10,032	76.93%	2,170	16.64%	797	6.11%	34	0.26%	8	0.06%	7,862	60.29%	13,041
Delaware	13,020	72.66%	4,158	23.20%	722	4.03%	12	0.07%	7	0.04%	8,862	49.46%	17,919
Dutchess	22,173	64.64%	8,864	25.84%	3,092	9.01%	130	0.38%	44	0.13%	13,309	38.80%	34,303
Erie	112,070	58.53%	40,780	21.30%	36,042	18.82%	1,969	1.03%	619	0.32%	71,290	37.23%	191,480
Essex	8,553	73.96%	2,639	22.82%	365	3.16%	3	0.03%	5	0.04%	5,914	51.14%	11,565
Franklin	9,352	64.43%	4,364	30.07%	788	5.43%	5	0.03%	6	0.04%	4,988	34.36%	14,515
Fulton	11,858	72.49%	3,143	19.21%	1,274	7.79%	47	0.29%	36	0.22%	8,715	53.28%	16,358
Genesee	11,101	71.43%	3,384	21.77%	1,013	6.52%	38	0.24%	6	0.04%	7,717	49.65%	15,542
Greene	7,503	61.56%	3,951	32.42%	703	5.77%	25	0.21%	6	0.05%	3,552	29.14%	12,188
Hamilton	1,063	61.23%	631	36.35%	39	2.25%	2	0.12%	1	0.06%	432	24.88%	1,736
Herkimer	15,625	66.31%	6,464	27.43%	1,386	5.88%	66	0.28%	22	0.09%	9,161	38.88%	23,563
Jefferson	21,159	68.38%	7,665	24.77%	2,044	6.61%	52	0.17%	22	0.07%	13,494	43.61%	30,942
Kings	236,877	47.50%	158,907	31.87%	100,721	20.20%	652	0.13%	1,530	0.31%	77,970	15.64%	498,687
Lewis	6,066	66.98%	2,801	30.93%	182	2.01%	3	0.03%	5	0.06%	3,265	36.05%	9,057
Livingston	10,472	69.56%	3,676	24.42%	866	5.75%	28	0.19%	13	0.09%	6,796	45.14%	15,055
Madison	11,589	71.01%	3,430	21.02%	1,226	7.51%	55	0.34%	21	0.13%	8,159	49.99%	16,321
Monroe	80,577	57.09%	28,956	20.52%	30,261	21.44%	957	0.68%	377	0.27%	50,316	35.65%	141,128
Montgomery	12,869	63.20%	5,939	29.17%	1,472	7.23%	55	0.27%	27	0.13%	6,930	34.03%	20,362
Nassau	45,825	70.47%	14,322	22.02%	4,699	7.23%	103	0.16%	82	0.13%	31,503	48.44%	65,031
New York	190,871	41.20%	183,249	39.55%	86,625	18.70%	723	0.16%	1,858	0.40%	7,622	1.65%	463,326
Niagara	25,874	67.98%	7,993	21.00%	3,977	10.45%	168	0.44%	50	0.13%	17,881	46.98%	38,062
Oneida	37,545	61.82%	18,124	29.84%	4,758	7.83%	194	0.32%	113	0.19%	19,421	31.98%	60,734
Onondaga	65,395	64.90%	24,773	24.58%	10,167	10.09%	338	0.34%	96	0.10%	40,622	40.31%	100,769
Ontario	15,013	66.66%	5,933	26.34%	1,517	6.74%	47	0.21%	13	0.06%	9,080	40.31%	22,523
Orange	29,184	67.74%	9,765	22.67%	3,956	9.18%	138	0.32%	40	0.09%	19,419	45.07%	43,083
Orleans	8,543	71.91%	2,320	19.53%	967	8.14%	18	0.15%	32	0.27%	6,223	52.38%	11,880
Oswego	18,576	65.08%	7,864	27.55%	2,006	7.03%	68	0.24%	28	0.10%	10,712	37.53%	28,542
Otsego	13,573	65.67%	5,841	28.26%	1,193	5.77%	52	0.25%	11	0.05%	7,732	37.41%	20,670
Putnam	3,796	67.73%	1,472	26.26%	320	5.71%	8	0.14%	9	0.16%	2,324	41.46%	5,605
Queens	100,793	53.57%	58,402	31.04%	28,210	14.99%	217	0.12%	547	0.29%	42,391	22.53%	188,169
Rensselaer	30,549	55.88%	19,783	36.18%	3,940	7.21%	263	0.48%	138	0.25%	10,766	19.69%	54,673
Richmond	18,007	47.91%	15,801	42.04%	3,702	9.85%	32	0.09%	44	0.12%	2,206	5.87%	37,586
Rockland	11,915	60.92%	5,640	28.84%	1,911	9.77%	66	0.34%	27	0.14%	6,275	32.08%	19,559
Saratoga	17,682	65.84%	7,026	26.16%	2,069	7.70%	65	0.24%	14	0.05%	10,656	39.68%	26,856
Schenectady	24,514	61.75%	9,167	23.09%	5,746	14.47%	218	0.55%	54	0.14%	15,347	38.66%	39,699
Schoharie	6,142	62.17%	3,413	34.55%	306	3.10%	12	0.12%	6	0.06%	2,729	27.62%	9,879
Schuyler	4,301	70.81%	1,555	25.60%	211	3.47%	4	0.07%	3	0.05%	2,746	45.21%	6,074
Seneca	6,598	66.15%	2,727	27.34%	619	6.21%	19	0.19%	11	0.11%	3,871	38.81%	9,974
St. Lawrence	22,583	71.50%	7,103	22.49%	1,826	5.78%	44	0.14%	28	0.09%	15,480	49.01%	31,584
Steuben	21,481	66.79%	7,194	22.37%	3,223	10.02%	216	0.67%	46	0.14%	14,287	44.42%	32,160
Suffolk	31,456	69.20%	10,024	22.05%	3,745	8.24%	177	0.39%	53	0.12%	21,432	47.15%	45,455
Sullivan	7,734	56.85%	4,057	29.82%	1,755	12.90%	39	0.29%	19	0.14%	3,677	27.03%	13,604
Tioga	7,834	72.47%	2,234	20.67%	715	6.61%	18	0.17%	9	0.08%	5,600	51.80%	10,810
Tompkins	11,766	72.98%	3,701	22.95%	619	3.84%	15	0.09%	22	0.14%	8,065	50.02%	16,123
Ulster	20,048	63.32%	9,361	29.57%	2,175	6.87%	36	0.11%	40	0.13%	10,687	33.76%	31,660
Warren	9,627	67.95%	3,663	25.85%	831	5.87%	45	0.32%	2	0.01%	5,964	42.09%	14,168
Washington	13,774	71.50%	4,321	22.43%	1,132	5.88%	31	0.16%	6	0.03%	9,453	49.07%	19,264
Wayne	14,358	73.69%	3,991	20.48%	1,109	5.69%	14	0.07%	13	0.07%	10,367	53.21%	19,485
Westchester	85,029	63.91%	30,964	23.28%	15,943	11.98%	871	0.65%	228	0.17%	54,065	40.64%	133,035
Wyoming	10,148	74.05%	2,512	18.33%	1,014	7.40%	25	0.18%	6	0.04%	7,636	55.72%	13,705
Yates	6,334	77.69%	1,568	19.23%	238	2.92%	10	0.12%	3	0.04%	4,766	58.46%	8,153
Totals	1,820,058	55.76%	950,796	29.13%	474,913	14.55%	9,928	0.30%	8,244	0.25%	869,262	26.63%	3,263,939

== Analysis ==
Nevertheless, Coolidge won all five boroughs of New York City, and thus won the city as a whole. Coolidge won with pluralities of the vote in Manhattan, Brooklyn, the Bronx, and Staten Island, and took an absolute majority of the vote in Queens. From his time as governor of neighboring Massachusetts, Coolidge remained, for a Republican, relatively popular with Irish Catholic and other ethnic immigrant communities, helping him to hold on to New York City. Many of these voters would defect to the Democrats for Catholic New Yorker Al Smith in 1928 and become reliable Democratic voters after that.

This is the last time that a Republican presidential candidate won New York City as a whole (after 1908 and 1920). This is the second and final time that a Republican presidential candidate won Manhattan and the Bronx, and thus every county in New York state (after having done so in 1920). This is the last of six elections in which Brooklyn voted Republican (including the elections from 1896 to 1908, and 1920).

Combined with decisive Republican majorities in every county in upstate New York and in Long Island, Coolidge easily dominated New York State's election returns in 1924. No Republican since has been able to outperform Coolidge's county-level performance or surpass his statewide margin of victory; the only stronger Republican win in New York's history was when Coolidge was running for Vice President four years earlier in Warren G. Harding’s massive landslide of 1920. Calvin Coolidge is one of only three presidential candidates of either party who has been able to sweep every county in New York State, the others being Republican Warren G. Harding in 1920 and Democrat Lyndon Johnson in 1964.

== See also ==
- United States presidential elections in New York
- Presidency of Calvin Coolidge
