= John A. Bensel =

American civil engineer (1863–1922)

John Anderson Bensel
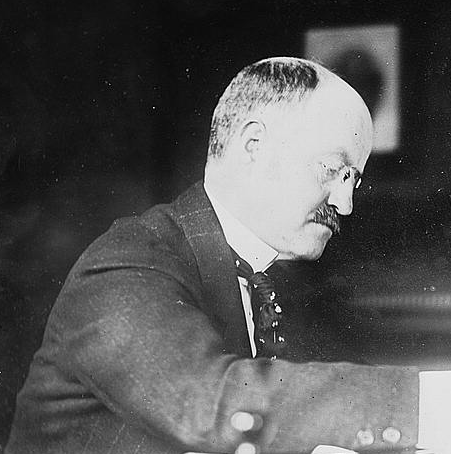
- Bensel circa 1910–1915

New York State Engineer and Surveyor
- In office 1911–1914
- Governor: John Alden Dix; William Sulzer
- Preceded by: Frank Martin Williams
- Succeeded by: Frank Martin Williams

Personal details
- Born: August 16, 1863 New York City
- Died: June 19, 1922 (aged 58) Bernardsville, New Jersey
- Spouse: Ella Louise Day (m. 1896–1922)
- Parent(s): Brownlee Bensel; Mary Maclay Hogg
- Education: Stevens Institute of Technology (1884)
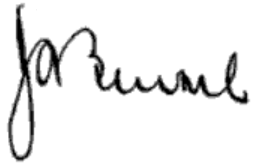
- Signature

John Anderson Bensel (August 16, 1863 – June 19, 1922) was an American civil engineer and politician from New York. He was President of the American Society of Civil Engineers in 1910. He was New York State Engineer and Surveyor from 1911 to 1914.

== Biography ==
He was born on August 16, 1863, in New York City to Brownlee Bensel and Mary Maclay Hogg. He graduated from Stevens Institute of Technology in 1884, and became an assistant engineer with the Aqueduct Commission. Then he worked for the Pennsylvania Railroad, and from 1889 to 1895 was in charge of constructions on New York City's North River waterfront.

In 1896, he married Ella Louise Day. The same year he became Consulting Engineer of the Philadelphia Water Department. In 1898, he became Chief Engineer of the New York City Dock Department, and in 1906 was appointed a Dock Commissioner.

From 1908 to 1910, he was President of the New York City Board of Water Supply. He was New York State Engineer and Surveyor from 1911 to 1914, elected on the Democratic ticket in 1910 and 1912, but defeated for re-election in 1914.

In 1914, he was investigated during Charles S. Whitman's graft investigation, but was cleared of all suspicions by his successor Frank M. Williams after the latter inspected the department's accounts in 1915.

As a major, he commanded the 125th Battalion of Engineers of the United States Army during World War I.

He died of myelitis on June 19, 1922, in Bernardsville, New Jersey at age 58. He was buried in Green-Wood Cemetery in Brooklyn, New York.

== Legacy ==
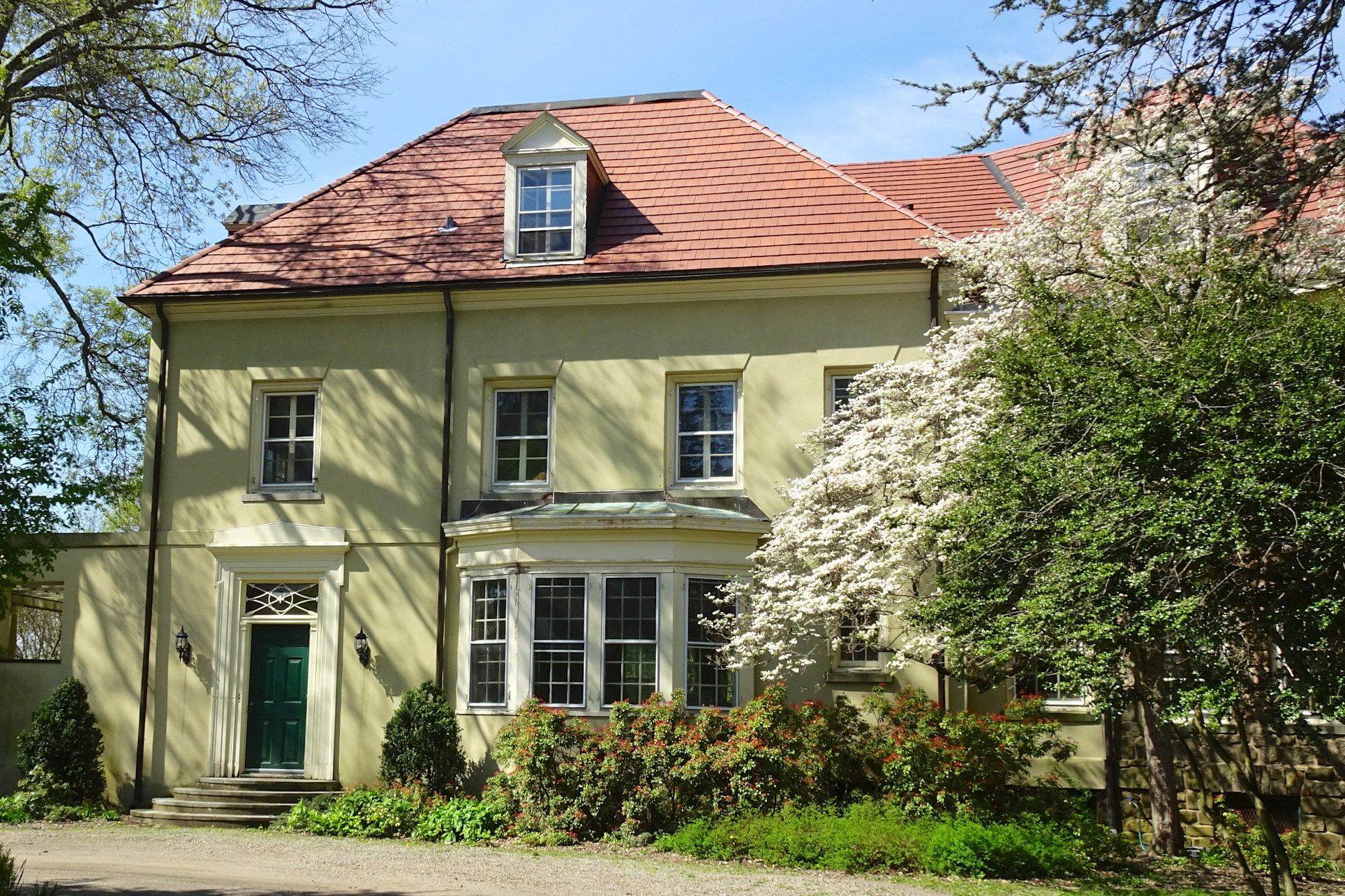
Queen Anne Farm, now Cross Estate Gardens

Bensel's New Jersey mansion, which was built in 1905 and was named "Queen Anne Farm", is now Cross Estate Gardens and part of the Morristown National Historic Park. The surrounding grounds are open to visitors and contain a five-story stone water tower and a large Silver Maple tree planted by Bensel in 1906.

Political offices
| Preceded by Frank M. Williams | New York State Engineer and Surveyor; 1911–1914 | Succeeded by Frank M. Williams |
