= New York State Engineer and Surveyor =

Former government agency (1848 - 1926)

The New York State Engineer and Surveyor was a state cabinet officer in the State of New York between 1848 and 1926. During the re-organization of the state government under Governor Al Smith, the office was abolished and its responsibilities transferred to the New York State Department of Public Works, which in turn was absorbed by the New York State Department of Transportation in 1967.

== History ==
The office was established as Surveyor General in 1781.

Until 1822, the Surveyor General was appointed by the Council of Appointment for an indefinite term. The second holder of the office, Simeon De Witt, was considered the most qualified person for the office and was re-appointed without regard to party politics. Even the Bucktails did not oust him when they were struggling with his first cousin DeWitt Clinton. The office was at first mostly occupied with surveying the uncharted area of the State and issuing official maps. In 1817, the Surveyor General became a member of the Erie Canal Commission.

From 1823 to 1845, the Surveyor General was elected by joint ballot of the New York State Legislature for a term of three years. Simeon De Witt was re-elected in 1823, 1826, 1829, and 1832, and died in office in 1834.

The Constitution of 1846 renamed the office as State Engineer and Surveyor, and the office's major concern was to be the supervision of the maintenance and enlargement of the Canal network. The candidates were required to be practical engineers.

From 1847 on, the State Engineer and the other state cabinet officers were elected by the voters at the state elections in November in odd years to a two-year term, so that, until 1877, they served in the second half of the term of the governor in office and the first half of the term of the succeeding governor, since the governors at the time were elected to a two-year term in even years. From 1877 on, the Governor served a three-year term, while the State Engineer continued to be elected for two years. The State Engineer elected in 1895 received an additional year and served a three-year term, and from 1898 on, the State Engineer and other state officers were elected in even years to a two-year term at the same time as the Governor, and they served concurrently.

== Surveyors General ==
Name	Took office	Left office	Party	Notes
Philip Schuyler	March 30, 1781	May 13, 1784		
Simeon De Witt	May 13, 1784	December 3, 1834	Democratic-Republican/Clintonian	died in office after 50 years of service, re-appointed and re-elected several times
William Campbell	January 20, 1835	February 5, 1838	Democratic	
Orville L. Holley	February 5, 1838	February 7, 1842	Whig	re-elected to a second term in 1841, but in 1842 all state officers were removed by Dem. legislature
Nathaniel Jones	February 7, 1842	February 3, 1845	Democratic	
Hugh Halsey	February 3, 1845	December 31, 1847	Democratic	office abolished by Constitution of 1846 and replaced with State Engineer and Surveyor

== Engineers and Surveyors ==
Name	Took office	Left office	Party	Notes
Charles B. Stuart	January 1, 1848	December 31, 1849	Whig	
Hezekiah C. Seymour	January 1, 1850	December 31, 1851	Whig	
William J. McAlpine	January 1, 1852	August 1, 1853	Democratic	resigned
Wheeler H. Bristol	September 21, 1853	1853	Democratic	appointed to fill an unexpired term, ran for the office at the State election in November, was defeated, and resigned
Henry Ramsay	December 10, 1853	December 31, 1853		appointed to fill an unexpired term
John T. Clark	January 1, 1854	December 31, 1855	Whig	
Silas Seymour	January 1, 1856	December 31, 1857	American	
Van Rensselaer Richmond	January 1, 1858	December 31, 1861	Democratic	two terms
William B. Taylor	January 1, 1862	December 31, 1865	Union	two terms
J. Platt Goodsell	January 1, 1866	December 31, 1867	Republican	
Van Rensselaer Richmond	January 1, 1868	December 31, 1871	Democratic	two terms
William B. Taylor	January 1, 1872	December 31, 1873	Republican	
Sylvanus H. Sweet	January 1, 1874	December 31, 1875	Democratic	
John D. Van Buren, Jr.	January 1, 1876	December 31, 1877	Democratic	
Horatio Seymour, Jr.	January 1, 1878	December 31, 1881	Democratic	two terms
Silas Seymour	January 1, 1882	December 31, 1883	Republican	
Elnathan Sweet	January 1, 1884	December 31, 1887	Democratic	two terms
John Bogart	January 1, 1888	December 31, 1891	Democratic	two terms
Martin Schenck	January 1, 1892	December 31, 1893	Democratic	
Campbell W. Adams	January 1, 1894	December 31, 1898	Republican	two terms (1894-95, 1896-98)
Edward A. Bond	January 1, 1899	May 1, 1904	Republican	resigned during his third term
Henry A. Van Alstyne	May 10, 1904	December 31, 1906	Republican	appointed to fill an unexpired term, then re-elected
Frederick Skene	January 1, 1907	December 31, 1908	Dem./Ind. League	
Frank M. Williams	January 1, 1909	December 31, 1910	Republican	
John A. Bensel	January 1, 1911	December 31, 1914	Democratic	two terms
Frank M. Williams	January 1, 1915	December 31, 1922	Republican	four terms
Dwight B. La Du	January 1, 1923	December 31, 1924	Democratic	
Roy G. Finch	January 1, 1925	December 31, 1926	Republican	last State Engineer and Surveyor, office merged into the Department of Public Works
