= List of elections in 1862 =

The following elections occurred in the year 1862.

- 1862 Argentine presidential election
- 1862 Greek parliamentary election
- 1862 Liechtenstein general election
- 1862 Norwegian parliamentary election
- Greek head of state referendum, 1862

== North America ==
=== United States ===
- 1862 New York state election
- 1862 United States elections

==== United States Senate ====
- 1862 and 1863 United States Senate elections

==== United States House of Representatives ====
- 1862 United States House of Representatives elections

==== United States lieutenant gubernatorial ====
- 1862 Connecticut lieutenant gubernatorial election

==== United States gubernatorial ====
- 1862 Connecticut gubernatorial election
- 1862 Delaware gubernatorial election
- 1862 Kansas gubernatorial election
- 1862 Maine gubernatorial election
- 1862 Massachusetts gubernatorial election
- 1862 Michigan gubernatorial election
- 1862 New Hampshire gubernatorial election
- 1862 New Jersey gubernatorial election
- 1862 New York gubernatorial election
- 1862 Oregon gubernatorial election
- 1862 Rhode Island gubernatorial election
- 1862 Vermont gubernatorial election

==== United States mayoral elections ====
- 1862 Boston mayoral election
- 1862 Chicago mayoral election
- 1862 Manchester, New Hampshire election
- 1862 Philadelphia mayoral election

== South America ==
=== Argentina ===
- 1862 Argentine presidential election

== See also ==
- Category:1862 elections
