= 1859 New York state election =

- November 8, 1859

The 1859 New York state election was held on November 8, 1859, to elect the Secretary of State, the State Comptroller, the Attorney General, the State Treasurer, the State Engineer, a Judge of the New York Court of Appeals, a Canal Commissioner, an Inspector of State Prisons and the Clerk of the Court of Appeals, as well as all members of the New York State Assembly and the New York State Senate. Besides, the voters were asked if the State could take a loan of US$2,500,000, which was answered in the affirmative with 125,370 for and 77,466 against.

== History ==
This was the last campaign of the American Party. They did not nominate anyone on their own ticket, but endorsed five Republican and four Democratic nominees.

== Results ==
Almost the whole cross-endorsed American ticket was elected. The approximate strength of The Republican Party (251,000 votes) was about the same as the combined strength of the Democratic Party (227,000 votes) and the American Party (24,000 votes). The five Republicans endorsed by the American Party had an easy victory, three of the four Democrats endorsed by the American Party struggled to win in a very tight race, only Elderkin missed the mark by 590 votes out of more than half a million cast.

The incumbents Church, Tremain, Vanderpoel and Johnson were defeated. The incumbent Richmond was re-elected.

23 Republicans and nine Democrats were elected to a two-year term (1860–61) in the New York State Senate.

91 Republicans and 37 Democrats were elected for the session of 1860 to the New York State Assembly.

1859 state election results
Office	Republican ticket		Democratic ticket		American ticket
Secretary of State	Elias W. Leavenworth	251,139	David R. Floyd-Jones	252,589	David R. Floyd-Jones
Comptroller	Robert Denniston	275,952	Sanford E. Church	227,304	Robert Denniston
Attorney General	Charles G. Myers	276,792	Lyman Tremain	227,345	Charles G. Myers
Treasurer	Philip Dorsheimer	275,587	Isaac V. Vanderpoel	226,755	Philip Dorsheimer
State Engineer	Orville W. Storey	250,880 (246,041)	Van Rensselaer Richmond	252,312 (250,247)	Van Rensselaer Richmond
Judge of the Court of Appeals	Henry E. Davies	272,275 (265,568)	Alexander S. Johnson	227,171 (223,525)	Henry E. Davies
Canal Commissioner	Ogden N. Chapin	251,449 (245,976)	William I. Skinner	251,777	William I. Skinner
Inspector of State Prisons	David P. Forrest	251,784 (243,430)	Noble S. Elderkin	251,194 (237,579)	Noble S. Elderkin
Clerk of the Court of Appeals	Charles Hughes	275,286	John L. Lewis Jr.	227,555 (221,084)	Charles Hughes

== See also ==
- New York state elections

== Sources ==
- Result in The Tribune Almanac 1860

== Notes ==
- The numbers given are the total votes on the Republican and American tickets for Denniston, Myers, Dorsheimer, Davies and Hughes, and the total of Democratic and American votes for Floyd-Jones, Richmond, Skinner and Elderkin.
- The votes given are the actual returns as transmitted by the counties to the Secretary of State, the officially declared vote (in parentheses) for some candidates is a little lower because on technicalities some of the votes were not allowed to be counted.
