= David B. McNeil =

American politician

David B. McNeil (1818 in Essex County, New York – April 15, 1897 in Auburn, Cayuga County, New York) was an American politician from New York.

== Life ==
He was the son of Col. David Breakenridge McNeil (born 1787, in Charlotte, Vermont, District Attorney of Essex County from 1828 to 1833, and Collector of the Port of Plattsburgh during the administration of President Andrew Jackson).

He was an invoice clerk at the Customs House in New York City under Collectors Cornelius P. Van Ness and Cornelius V. W. Lawrence (1844–1849). Afterwards he was for seven years Clerk of Clinton State Prison. Then he worked in the office of the Secretary of State of New York under David R. Floyd-Jones and Horatio Ballard (1860–1863). He was Warden of Auburn State Prison from January 1864 to 1865. During his administration, Auburn Prison made a profit of $16,000, whereas during the first year of his successor the prison had a deficit of $40,000. "McNeil came out of office poor. As to his successor in that respect, we leave the matter to general rumor."

In 1863, he ran on the Democratic ticket for Inspector of State Prisons but was defeated by James K. Bates. In 1864, he ran again for Inspector of State Prisons but was defeated by David P. Forrest. In 1868, he ran again, and was elected. He was in office from 1869 to 1871, but was defeated for re-election in 1871 by Thomas Kirkpatrick.

== Sources ==
- DEATH LIST OF A DAY,;...D. B. McNEIL in NYT on April 16, 1897
