= 1854 New York gubernatorial election =

- November 7, 1854
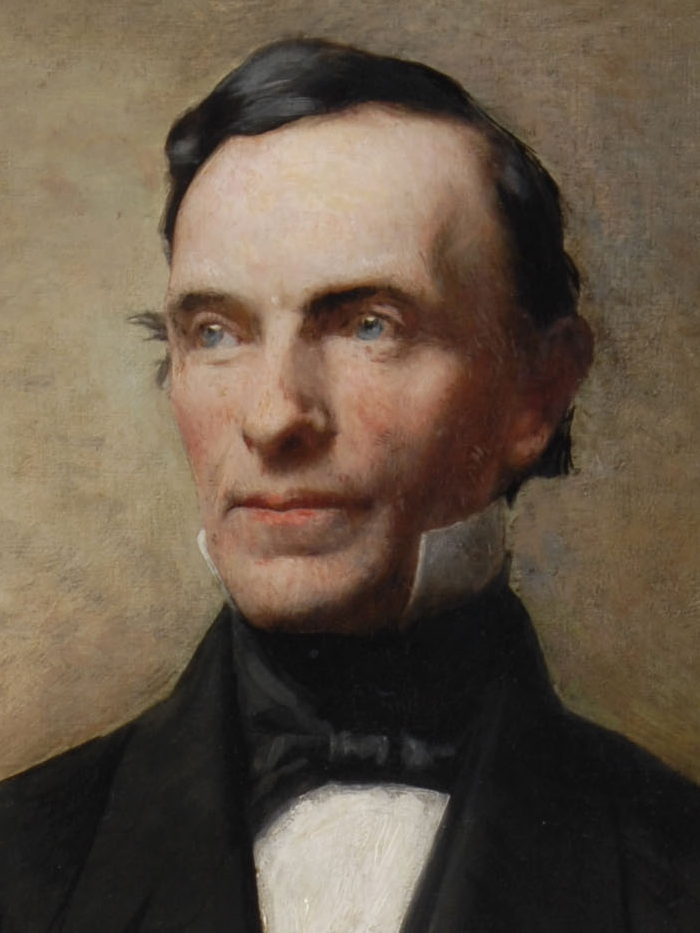

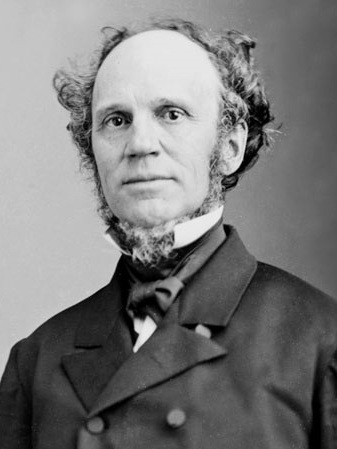

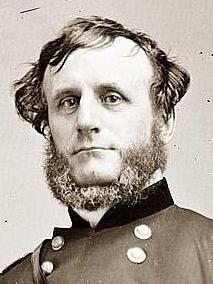

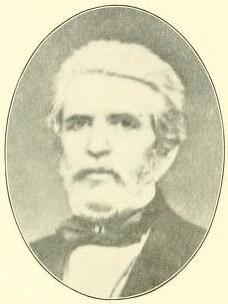
Nominee	Myron Clark	Horatio Seymour
Party	Whig	Soft Shell Democratic
Alliance	Parties: Anti-Nebraska; Anti-Nebraska seceders; Anti-Rent; Free Soil; Temperance	—
Popular vote	156,804	156,495
Percentage	33.38%	33.32%
Nominee	Daniel Ullman	Greene Bronson
Party	Know Nothing	Hard Shell Democratic
Alliance	Silver Grays	—
Popular vote	122,282	33,850
Percentage	26.03%	7.21%
- Results by county Clark: 20–30% 30–40% 40–50% 50–60% 60–70% Seymour: 30–40% 40–50% 50–60% Ullman: 20–30% 30–40% 40–50% 50–60% No votes
Governor before election
Horatio Seymour
Democratic
Elected Governor
Myron Clark
Whig

The 1854 New York gubernatorial election was held on November 7, 1854. Incumbent Governor Horatio Seymour ran for re-election to a second term in office but was defeated by Myron Clark. Clark won with only 33.38% of the vote, the lowest percentage of any successful candidate in state history.

Like many of the elections across the country that year, the campaign was dominated by the debate over the Kansas-Nebraska Act, with the Democratic Party splitting once more over the issue of slavery and opponents of the Franklin Pierce administration endorsing Clark, with the exception of the American Party, which ran Daniel Ullman and finished in a strong third.

== Whig nominations ==
=== Convention ===
Maneuvering by antislavery Sewardites, conservative Silver Gray Whigs, and representatives of the nativist and temperance movements preceded the Whig state convention at Syracuse, New York, on September 20. The Sewardites at first hoped to reunite the party's warring factions around common opposition to the Kansas–Nebraska Act, but lingering Silver Gray resentment made a struggle for control of the party "irrepressible." Seymour's veto of a proposed state prohibition law in March divided Whigs and ruled out the candidacies of William H. Seward, who was unacceptable to hardline temperance activists, and Horace Greeley, who was opposed by anti-temperance "wets." So, too, the rise of the Know Nothing order posed a problem for the Sewardites and threatened to split the Whig Party and replace slavery as the main issue of the campaign.

Several candidates emerged, including Clark, a loyal Sewardite and a prohibitionist; Ullman, a Silver Gray Whig with ties to the Know Nothing order; and anti-Know Nothing Sewardites George W. Patterson and Elbridge G. Spaulding. Sewardite political boss Thurlow Weed preferred Patterson, but Clark's popularity with temperance supporters as the author of the vetoed prohibition bill quickly made him the leading Sewardite candidate. Ullman spent much of the spring cultivating the support of New York's Know Nothings, who shared the Silver Grays' dislike for the Sewardites' pro-immigrant, pro-Catholic politics. Clark also opportunistically claimed ties to the order and joined a "bogus" Know Nothing lodge shortly before the convention.

Clark gained Weed's endorsement on the night before the convention and was nominated on the third ballot. The nomination for lieutenant governor went to Henry J. Raymond, the Sewardite editor of the New York Times and outspoken temperance opponent. In an effort to appease the disappointed Silver Grays, the platform adopted by the convention opposed the Kansas-Nebraska Act but did not call for repeal of the Fugitive Slave Act. The platform took no position on nativism or temperance, despite Clark's outspoken public support for prohibition.

=== Silver Grays ===
Clark's endorsement by the Anti-Nebraska convention alienated the Silver Grays. Fearful that any association with abolitionists would damage their party in the Southern United States, the conservatives held their own state convention at Albany, New York, on October 24. The delegates repudiated the Anti-Nebraska platform and called for a future convention "to re-instate the old Whig party on its old platform." The gathering endorsed Ullman in the gubernatorial election and organized a letter-writing campaign on his behalf.

== Democratic nominations ==
=== Background ===
In the 1840s, the New York Democratic Party split between its anti-slavery "Barnburner" wing and its conservative "Hunker" wing, culminating in the nomination of Martin Van Buren for president on a Barnburner "Free Soil" ticket in 1848.

Following the Compromise of 1850, the two wings initially reconciled, though there was a further split in the Hunker camp between "Hard Shell" men who opposed reconciliation and "Soft Shell" men, who favored it. After the Kansas-Nebraska Act passed, renewed attention on the issue of slavery broke this fragile truce, and all factions were once again at odds. The Hards, who believed that anti-slavery men no longer had any place in the Democratic Party, broke off to form their own "National Democratic" ticket, while many radical anti-slavery men also broke from the Democrats to join the Anti-Nebraska and Free Soil parties in 1854.

=== Softs ===
The regular Democratic (Soft) state convention met on September 6 at Wieting Hall in Syracuse. On September 7, the convention passed a resolution approving the Kansas–Nebraska Act, which led to the withdrawal of several Barnburner delegates, including Preston King, Charles G. Myers, Abijah Mann, and Philip Dorsheimer, all of whom would found the Republican Party in the following year. Governor Seymour was re-nominated by acclamation with a few dissenting votes, including that of Mann.

=== Hards ===
The National Democratic (Hard) state convention met in July and nominated Greene C. Bronson for governor. They informed the nominees by letter on July 12 of their nominations. Their letters of acceptance were published on September 11 in the New-York Daily Times.

== Know Nothing nomination ==
The Know Nothing state convention met at New York City on October 4. Angered by the Sewardites' attempts to co-opt the Know Nothing movement, and by the other parties' failure to oppose Catholic immigration, the grand council declared that none of the major party candidates would be eligible to receive the convention's endorsement. Ullman won the nomination on the first ballot with 257 votes; Joseph W. Savage received 114 votes, and Thomas R. Whiting received 60, with 51 scattering. An unspecified number of votes for Clark were rejected by the convention president. Because the order intended for Ullman's candidacy to demonstrate their strength of numbers, rather than persuade non-members to support the Know Nothing candidates, the convention did not publish a platform. Ullman nonetheless received significant support from Silver Gray Whigs, anti-temperance Whigs, and Democrats.

== Other nominations ==
The Anti-Nebraska state convention met at Saratoga Springs, New York, on August 16. Although the convention organizers did not mention plans to nominate a state ticket, Horace Greeley hoped to use the gathering to launch the Republican Party in New York. The Republican movement was aided by Democrats who hoped to divide the Whig Party in the upcoming elections, as well as by proslavery Silver-Gray Whigs intent on weakening their party's antislavery faction. Desperate to prevent a separate Anti-Nebraska nomination, Whig leaders successfully postponed naming a state ticket until late September, after the Whig state convention was scheduled to meet.

The Free Soil, Anti-Nebraska, and Temperance state conventions met consecutively at Auburn, New York, from September 25 to 27. The Temperance convention met in Stamford Hall and nominated the Whig state ticket by acclamation. The Free Soilers opposed adopting the Whig ticket in its entirety, preferring a mixed ticket made up of antislavery Whigs and Democrats. Rather than nominate its own ticket, the convention called for all antislavery factions to support the growing Republican movement. Despite their efforts, the Whig leaders were able to secure Clark's nomination by the Anti-Nebraska convention alongside the entire Whig ticket. To the Whigs' embarrassment, however, the Anti-Nebraskans' platform condemned the Fugitive Slave Act of 1850 and called for an exclusively Northern ticket to contest the 1856 United States presidential election.

A group of between 15 and 25 delegates to the Anti-Nebraska convention split off from the main gathering. Meeting concurrently with the Free Soilers in the Auburn City Hall, they nominated Clark atop a mixed ticket composed of an equal number of Whigs and Democrats.

The Anti-Rent state convention that met at Albany, New York, on October 26. The delegates nominated Clark on a platform calling for the revision of the state's land ownership laws.

The Liberty state convention met at Syracuse on September 28. William Goodell was nominated for governor with only a single dissenting vote for Clark.

== General election ==
=== Candidates ===
- Greene C. Bronson, collector of the port of New York and former chief judge of the New York Court of Appeals (Hard Shell Democratic)
- Myron Clark, assemblyman from Canandaigua, New York (Whig, Anti-Nebraska, Anti-Nebraska seceders, Anti-Rent, Free Soil, Temperance)
- William Goodell, editor and nominee in 1848 (Liberty)
- Horatio Seymour, incumbent governor (Soft Shell Democratic)
- Daniel Ullman, attorney (Know Nothing, Silver Grays)

=== Results ===
1854 New York gubernatorial election
Party	Candidate	Votes	%	±%
Whig	Myron Clark	156,804	33.38%	▼12.63
Soft Shell Democratic	Horatio Seymour (incumbent)	156,495	33.32%	▼16.99
Know Nothing	Daniel Ullman	122,282	26.03%	N/A
Hard Shell Democratic	Greene C. Bronson	33,850	7.21%	N/A
Liberty	William Goodell	289	0.06%	N/A
Total votes		469,720	100.00%	

== See also ==
- New York gubernatorial elections
- New York state elections

== Bibliography ==
- Holt, Michael F. (1999). The Rise and Fall of the American Whig Party: Jacksonian Politics and the Onset of the Civil War. New York: Oxford University Press.
