= 1864 New York gubernatorial election =

- November 8, 1864
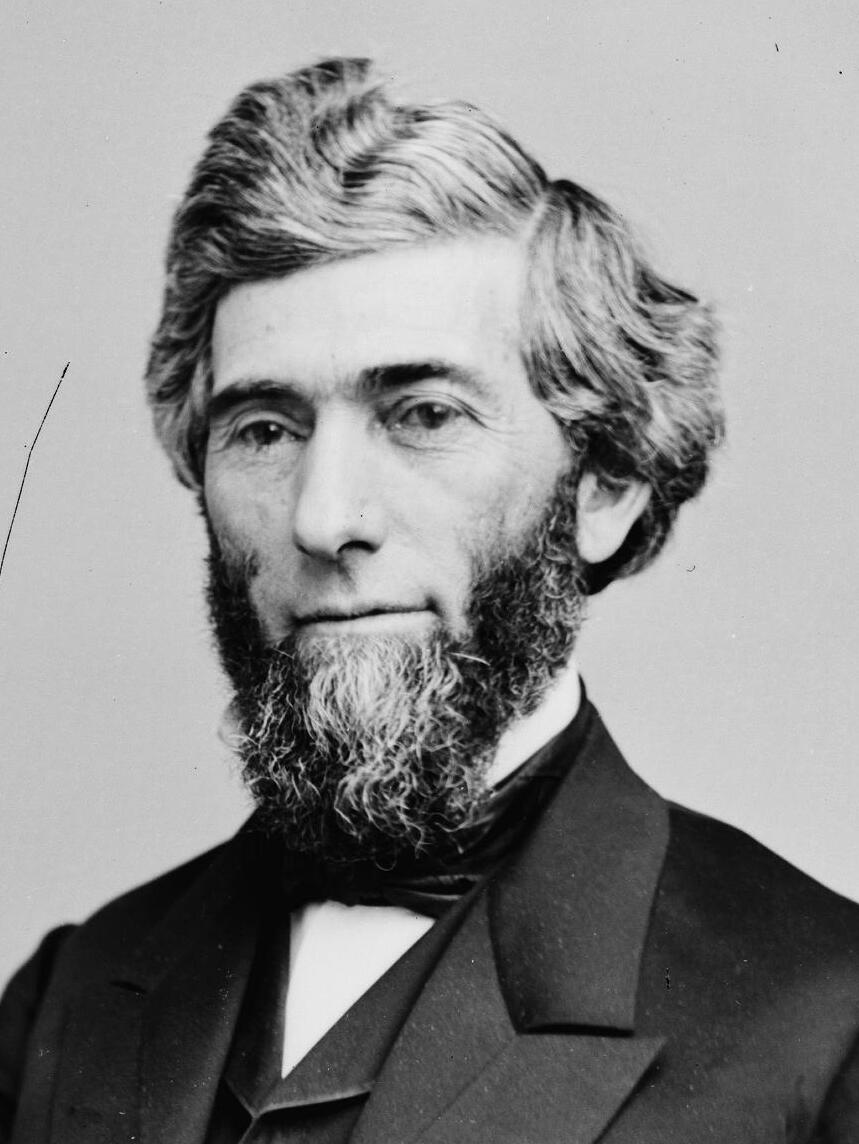

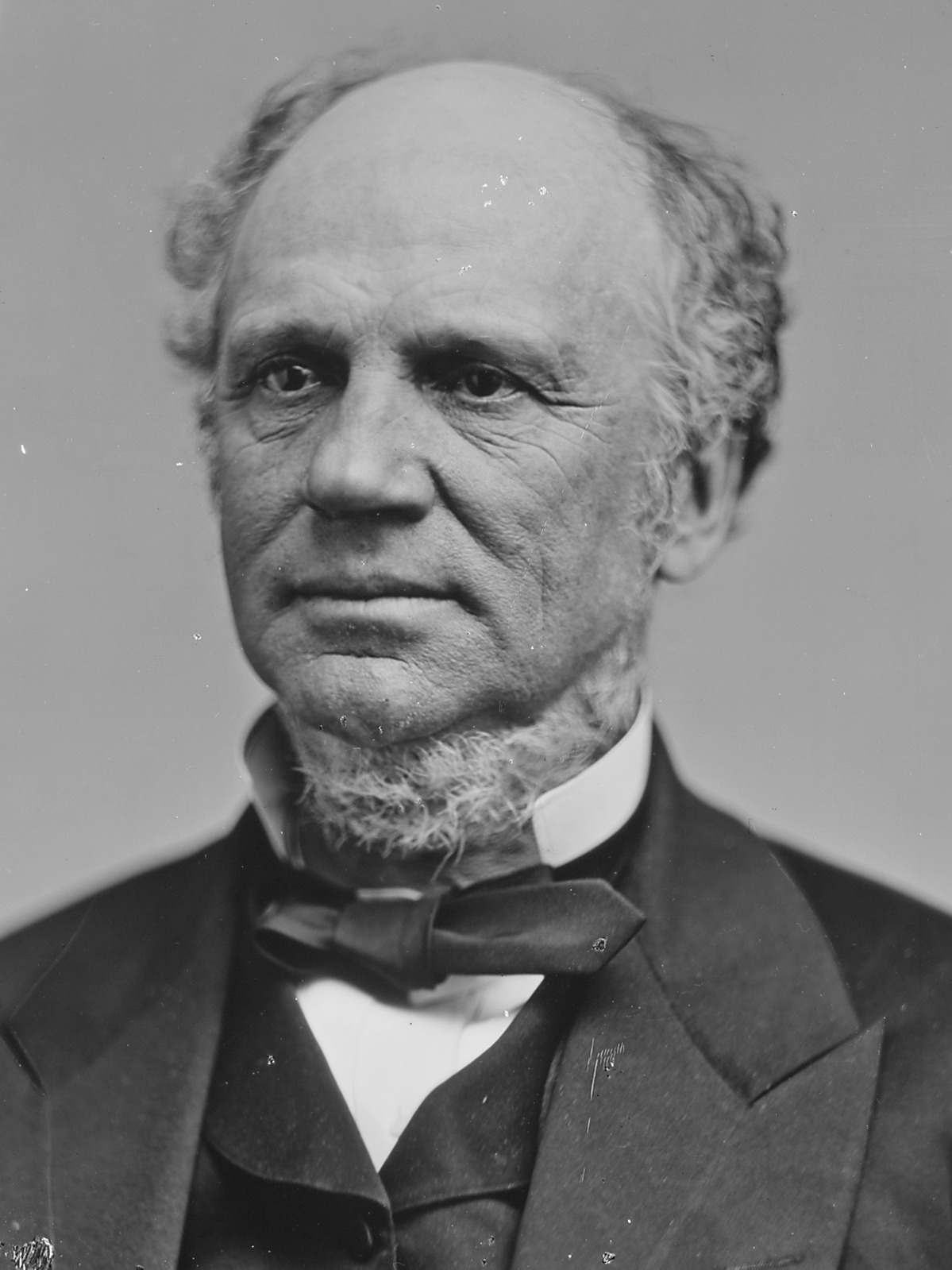
Nominee	Reuben Fenton	Horatio Seymour
Party	National Union	Democratic
Popular vote	369,557	352,526
Percentage	50.57%	49.43%
- County results Fenton: 50–60% 60–70% 70–80% Seymour: 50–60% 60–70% No Date
Governor before election
Horatio Seymour
Democratic
Elected Governor
Reuben Fenton
National Union

The 1864 New York gubernatorial election was held on November 8, 1864. Incumbent Governor Horatio Seymour ran for re-election to a second consecutive term in office but was defeated by National Union candidate Reuben E. Fenton.

== National Union nomination ==
=== Candidates ===
- John Adams Dix, U.S. Army major general and former U.S. Secretary of the Treasury and U.S. Senator
- Reuben Fenton, U.S. Representative from Frewsburg
- Lyman Tremain, former Democratic Attorney General of New York

=== Convention ===
The National Union state convention met on September 7 in Syracuse.

1864 National Union convention
Party	Candidate	Votes	%
National Union	Reuben Fenton	247.5	70.31%
National Union	Lyman Tremain	69	19.60%
National Union	John Adams Dix	35.5	10.09%
Total votes		352	100.00%

== Democratic nomination ==
=== Candidates ===
- Horatio Seymour, incumbent Governor of New York

=== Convention ===
The Democratic state convention met on September 14 and 15 in Albany. Governor Seymour was re-nominated by acclamation.

== General election ==
=== Candidates ===
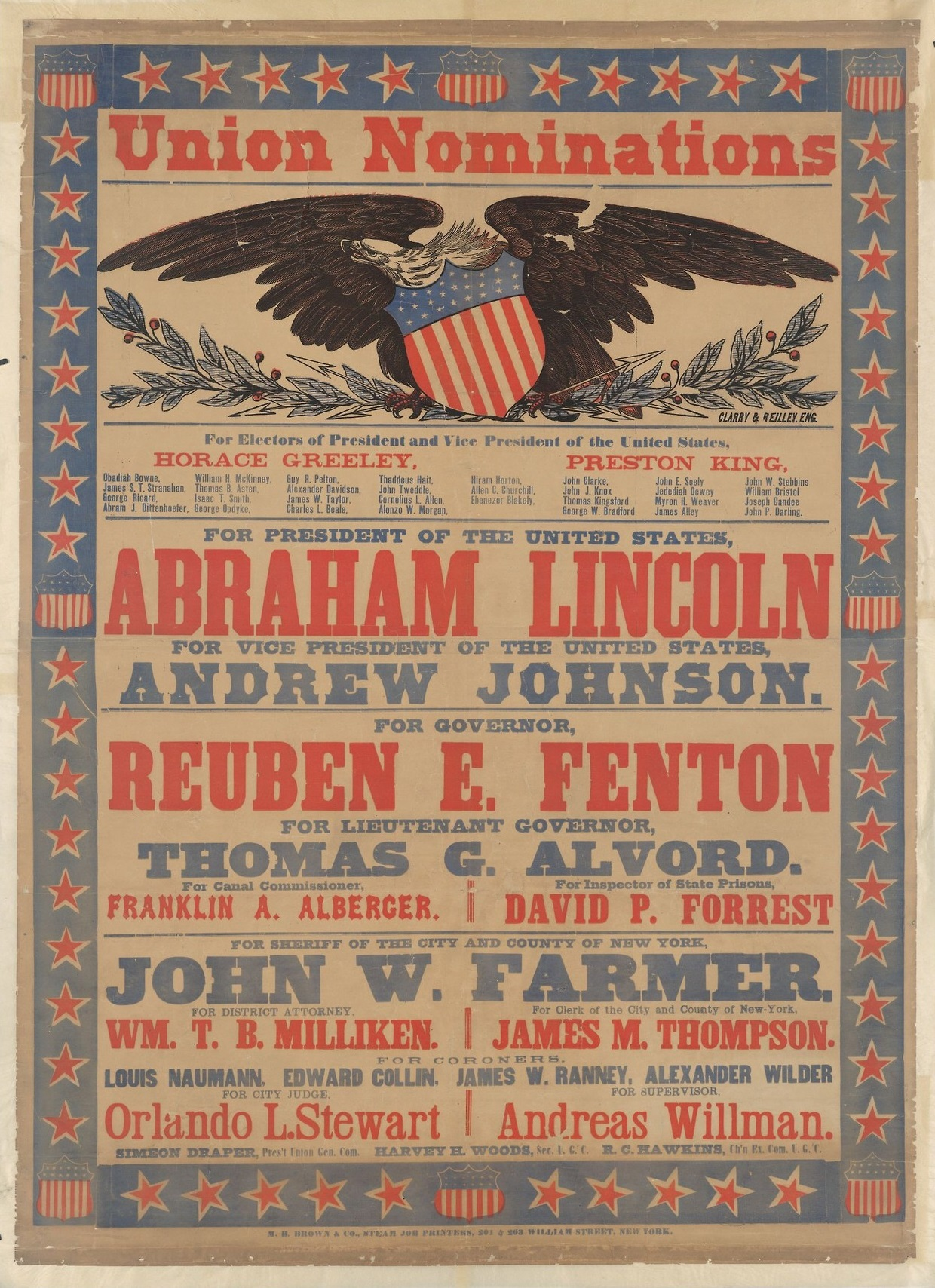
1864 Union campaign poster featuring Abraham Lincoln and Reuben Fenton

- Horatio Seymour, incumbent Governor of New York (Democratic)
- Reuben Fenton, U.S. Representative from Frewsburg (National Union)

=== Results ===
1864 New York gubernatorial election
Party	Candidate	Votes	%	±%
National Union	Reuben Fenton	369,557	50.57%	▲1.46
Democratic	Horatio Seymour	352,526	49.43%	▼1.46
Total votes		722,083	100.00%	

=== New York City results ===
Results by ward (New York County)
Ward	Fenton Union		Seymour Democratic		Total
Ward	Votes	%	Votes	%	Votes
1	208	8.89%	2,132	91.11%	2,340
2	188	36.02%	334	63.98%	522
3	221	30.65%	500	69.35%	721
4	397	14.08%	2,423	85.92%	2,820
5	1,012	33.27%	2,030	66.73%	3,042
6	347	9.18%	3,434	90.82%	3,781
7	1,199	22.80%	4,060	77.20%	5,259
8	1,520	31.71%	3,274	68.29%	4,794
9	3,504	47.91%	3,809	52.09%	7,313
10	1,626	40.71%	2,368	59.29%	3,994
11	1,885	25.62%	5,473	74.38%	7,358
12	1,277	33.94%	2,485	66.06%	3,762
13	1,082	28.15%	2,762	71.85%	3,844
14	809	15.99%	4,251	84.01%	5,060
15	2,228	53.05%	1,972	46.95%	4,200
16	2,867	45.36%	3,454	54.64%	6,321
17	3,362	32.29%	7,049	67.71%	10,411
18	2,659	38.03%	4,333	61.97%	6,992
19	1,918	34.83%	3,589	65.17%	5,507
20	2,875	34.17%	5,538	65.83%	8,413
21	2,783	40.26%	4,129	59.74%	6,912
22	2,343	36.15%	4,138	63.85%	6,481
Totals	36,310	33.06%	73,537	66.94%	109,847

== See also ==
- New York gubernatorial elections
- 1864 New York state election
- 1864 United States elections
