= Attorney General Myers =

Attorney General Myers may refer to:

- Charles G. Myers (1810–1881), Attorney General of New York
- Hardy Myers (1939–2016), Attorney General of Oregon

== See also ==
- General Myers (disambiguation)
