= General Floyd =

General Floyd may refer to:

- John B. Floyd (1806–1863), Confederate States Army brigadier general
- William Floyd (1734–1821), Suffolk County Militia major general in the American Revolutionary War
- Sir John Floyd, 1st Baronet (1748–1818), British Army general

== See also ==
- DeLancey Floyd-Jones (1826–1902), U.S. Army brigadier general
