= 1864 New York state election =

- November 8, 1864

The 1864 New York state election was held on November 8, 1864, to elect the governor, the lieutenant governor, a Canal Commissioner and an Inspector of State Prisons, as well as all members of the New York State Assembly.

== Nominations ==
=== Union Party ===
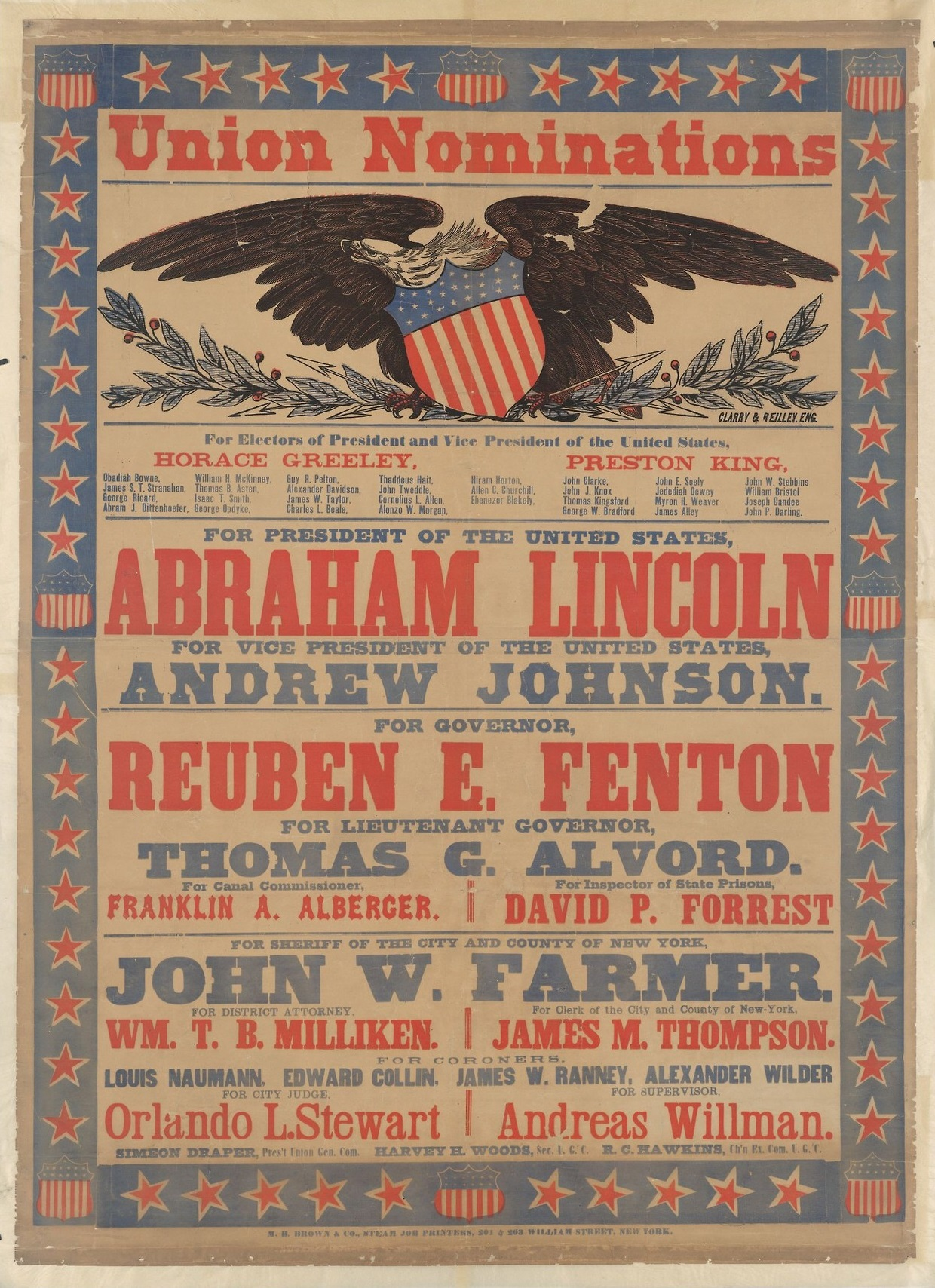
Campaign poster featuring Union nominations, 1864

The Union state convention - Republicans and War Democrats which supported the Union and Abraham Lincoln's policy during the American Civil War - met on September 7 at Syracuse, New York. A. H. Bailey was Temporary Chairman until the choice of DeWitt C. Littlejohn as Permanent Chairman. Reuben E. Fenton was nominated for governor after an informal vote; Thomas G. Alvord was nominated for lieutenant governor. The incumbent Canal Commissioner Franklin A. Alberger was re-nominated without formalities. Ex-Prison Inspector David P. Forrest (in office 1860–1862) was nominated again after a large majority was felt halfway through an informal vote.

==== Gubernatorial nomination ====
Candidate	1st
Reuben E. Fenton	237 ½
Lyman Tremain	69
John Adams Dix	35 ½

==== Lieutenant gubernatorial nomination ====
Candidate	1st
Thomas G. Alvord	246
Waldo Hutchins	96 ½
Richard M. Blatchford	19
William H. Robertson	13
James A. Bell	12
Demas Strong	10

=== Democratic Party ===
The Democratic state convention met on September 14 and 15 at Albany, New York. Daniel Pratt was chosen Permanent Chairman. Gov. Horatio Seymour and Lt. Gov. David R. Floyd-Jones were re-nominated by acclamation. Jarvis Lord for Canal Commissioner, and David B. McNeil for Prison Inspector, also were nominated by acclamation.

== Result ==
The whole Union ticket was elected in a tight race with less than 8,000 votes majority out of about 730,000.

The incumbents Seymour and Floyd-Jones were defeated. The incumbent Alberger was re-elected.

76 Unionists and 52 Democrats were elected for the session of 1865 to the New York State Assembly.

1864 state election results
Office	Union ticket		Democratic ticket	
Governor	Reuben E. Fenton	369,557	Horatio Seymour	361,264
Lieutenant Governor	Thomas G. Alvord	369,365	David R. Floyd-Jones	361,849
Canal Commissioner	Franklin A. Alberger	369,367	Jarvis Lord	361,642
Inspector of State Prisons	David P. Forrest	369,428	David B. McNeil	361,313

== See also ==
- New York gubernatorial elections

== Sources ==
- Result in The Tribune Almanac compiled by Horace Greeley of the New York Tribune
