= 1862 New York gubernatorial election =

- November 4, 1862
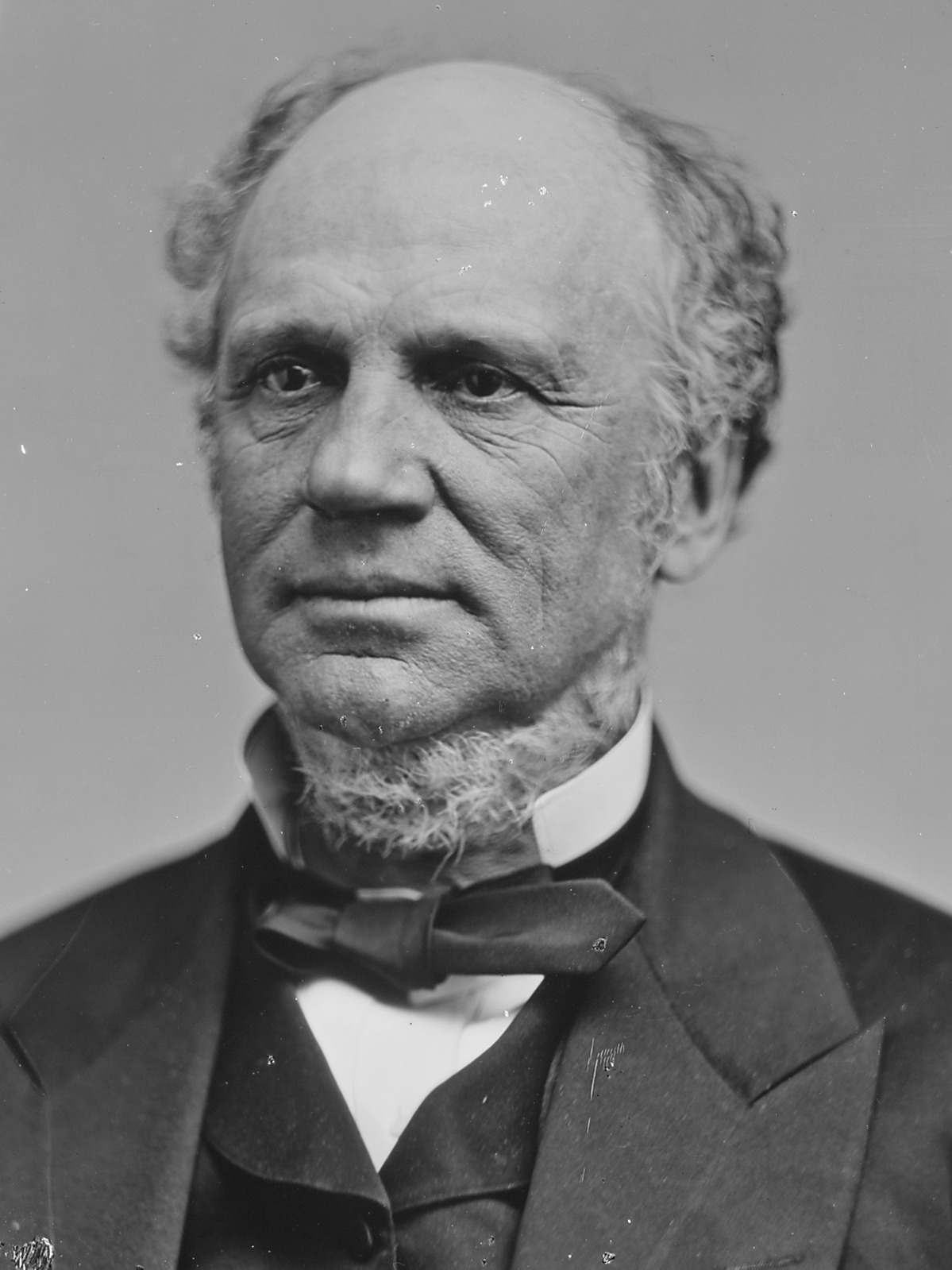

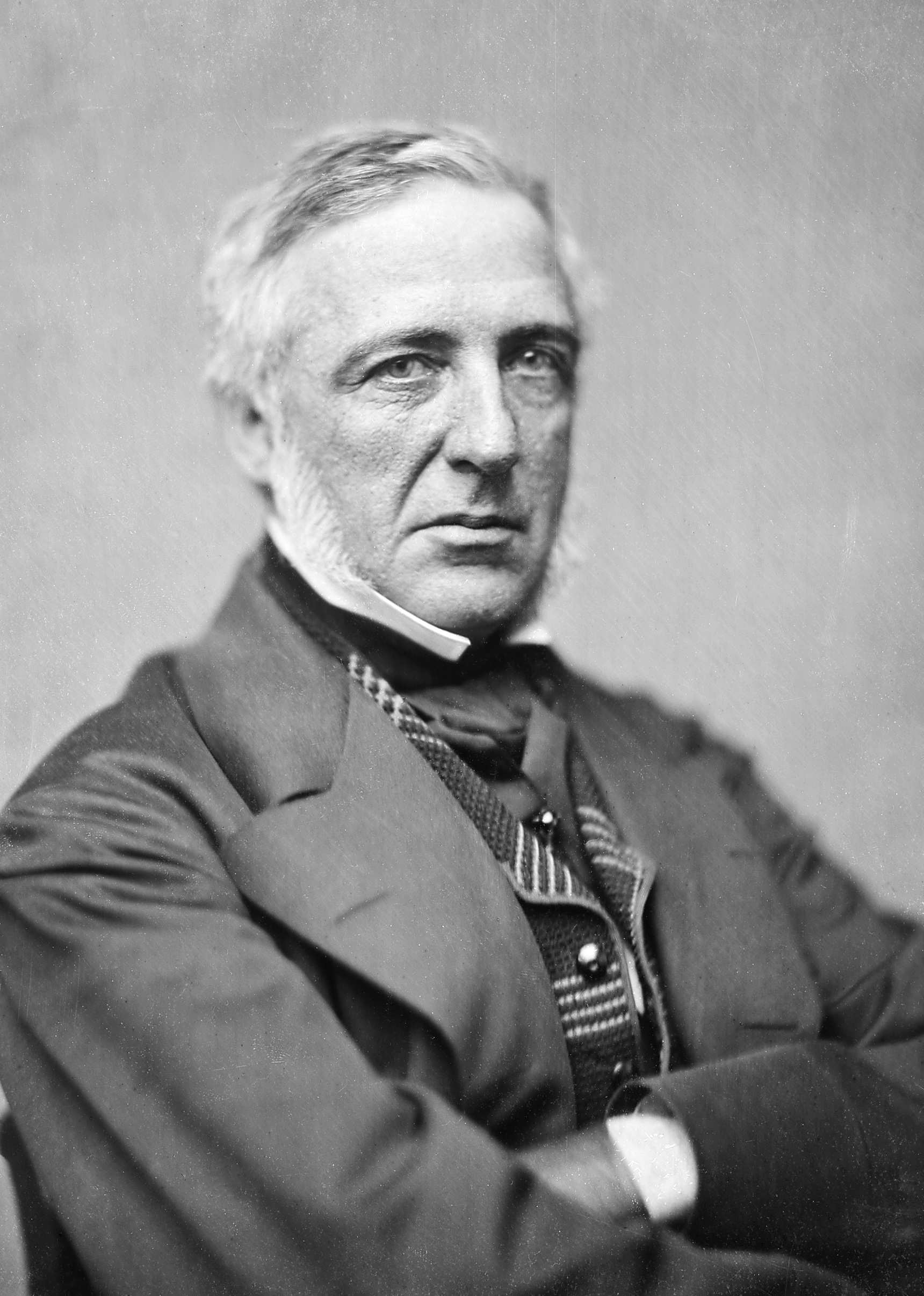
Nominee	Horatio Seymour	James S. Wadsworth
Party	Democratic	National Union
Popular vote	306,649	295,897
Percentage	50.89%	49.11%
- County results Seymour: 50–60% 60–70% 70–80% Wadsworth: 50–60% 60–70% 70–80% No Data
Governor before election
Edwin D. Morgan
Republican
Elected Governor
Horatio Seymour
Democratic

The 1862 New York gubernatorial election was held on November 4, 1862. Incumbent Governor Edwin D. Morgan did not run for a third consecutive term in office. Democratic former Governor Horatio Seymour was elected over Union candidate James S. Wadsworth.

== Constitutional Union nomination ==
The Constitution Union state convention met on September 9 at Association Hall in Troy. Horatio Seymour led informal balloting for governor, but the convention adjourned without a nomination. The next day, its delegates joined the Democratic convention in Albany.

1862 Constitutional Union convention
Party	Candidate	Votes	%
Constitutional Union	Horatio Seymour	32	52.46%
Constitutional Union	John Adams Dix	20	32.79%
Constitutional Union	Millard Fillmore	6	9.84%
Constitutional Union	Frederick A. Tallmadge	1	1.64%
Constitutional Union	James Brooks	1	1.64%
Constitutional Union	Lorenzo Burrows	1	1.64%
Total votes		61	100.00%

== Democratic nomination ==
=== Candidates ===
- Horatio Seymour, former Governor of New York (1853–54)

==== Declined ====
- Fernando Wood, mayor of New York City

=== Convention ===
The Democratic state convention met at Tweddle Hall in Albany on September 10, one day after the Constitutional Union convention. For the first time in many years, the party was united in New York City, with mayor Fernando Wood and Tammany Hall sharing portions of the delegation. A committee of ten, including August Belmont, was appointed to confer with the Constitutional Union delegates, who were invited to join the convention to a storm of applause.

Horatio Seymour was nominated for governor by acclamation following an enthusiastic demonstration. Once order was restored, Seymour delivered an acceptance speech criticizing both the United States Congress and the Abraham Lincoln administration for their conduct during the Civil War, citing Republican journalists and Proverbs 20:3 ("It is an honor for a man to cease from strife: but every fool will be meddling."). Though he credited the Republican Congress with honesty, he accused radicals in Congress of insubordination to the Lincoln administration by pursuing the abolition of slavery, which united the South and divided the North. By contrast, he pledged that the Democratic Party would be loyal and obedient to the laws and Constitution, supporting the cause of the Union.

Seymour's acceptance speech was followed by a brief address from Fernando Wood, who endorsed Seymour, pledging a strong majority of the vote from New York, and accused the Lincoln administration of arresting dissenters.

== Union nomination ==
=== Candidates ===
- John Adams Dix, United States Army major general and former U.S. Secretary of the Treasury and U.S. Senator
- Lyman Tremain, former Democratic Attorney General of New York
- James S. Wadsworth, United States Army brevet major general and commander of the Military District of Washington, D.C.

=== Convention ===
The Union state convention met at Wieting Hall in Syracuse on September 24. The Union Party included Republicans as well as War Democrats like Lyman Tremain, who was nominated for Lieutenant Governor.

1862 Union convention
Party	Candidate	Votes	%
National Union	James S. Wadsworth	234	61.74%
National Union	John Adams Dix	110	29.02%
National Union	Lyman Tremain	33	8.71%
National Union	Daniel S. Dickinson	2	0.53%
Total votes		379	100.00%

The Albany delegation voted for Tremain, except Tremain himself, who voted for Dickinson. After the result was announced, Tremain applauded both Wadsworth and Dix, withdrew his name from consideration and called for Wadsworth to be nominated unanimously. Tremain was nominated unanimously for Lieutenant Governor with the support of William Curtis Noyes, whom he had defeated for Attorney General in 1857.

== General election ==
=== Candidates ===
- Horatio Seymour, former Governor of New York (1853–54) (Democratic, Constitutional Union)
- James S. Wadsworth, United States Army brevet major general and commander of the Military District of Washington, D.C. (Union)

=== Results ===
1862 New York gubernatorial election
Party	Candidate	Votes	%	±%
Democratic	Horatio Seymour	306,649	50.89%	▲7.08
National Union	James S. Wadsworth	295,897	49.11%	▼4.13
Total votes		602,546	100.00%	

=== New York City results ===
Results by ward (New York County)
Ward	Seymour Democratic		Wadsworth Union		Total
Ward	Votes	%	Votes	%	Votes
1	1,282	85.47%	218	14.53%	1,500
2	249	55.96%	196	44.04%	445
3	434	70.92%	178	29.08%	612
4	1,750	89.06%	215	10.94%	1,965
5	1,569	68.88%	709	31.12%	2,278
6	2,152	91.15%	209	8.85%	2,361
7	2,822	78.06%	793	21.94%	3,615
8	2,464	72.53%	933	27.47%	3,397
9	3,040	59.43%	2,075	40.57%	5,115
10	2,009	70.49%	841	29.51%	2,850
11	4,191	79.86%	1,057	20.14%	5,248
12	2,109	69.97%	905	30.03%	3,014
13	2,151	74.10%	752	25.90%	2,903
14	2,314	85.36%	397	14.64%	2,711
15	1,628	52.31%	1,484	47.69%	3,112
16	2,775	60.00%	1,850	40.00%	4,625
17	5,280	74.07%	1,848	25.93%	7,128
18	3,327	64.85%	1,803	35.15%	5,130
19	2,645	69.92%	1,138	30.08%	3,783
20	3,936	68.75%	1,789	31.25%	5,725
21	2,920	61.89%	1,798	38.11%	4,718
22	3,265	70.78%	1,348	29.22%	4,613
Totals	54,312	70.67%	22,536	29.33%	76,848

== See also ==
- New York gubernatorial elections
- 1862 New York state election
- 1862 United States elections
