= Edward Floyd-Jones =

American politician

Edward Floyd-Jones (January 26, 1823 – January 23, 1901) was an American politician from New York.

== Life ==
Edward was born on January 26, 1823, in Massapequa, then part of Queens County. His parents were Henry Floyd-Jones (1792-1862) and Helen (Watts) Floyd-Jones (1792-1872). His younger brother was Brigadier General DeLancey Floyd-Jones.

He was educated at Union Hall Academy in Jamaica, Queens, and in 1849 moved to California during the California Gold Rush. He established the Jones & Hewlett firm in Stockton, but in 1862 he moved to Hempstead, Long Island for a few years. While there, he married Mary Smith Lloyd (1839-1874) on December 10, 1862, in Greenport. Mary was the daughter of Representative Frederick William Lord. Edward and Mary had three children: Helen Watts Floyd-Jones (1863-1917), Louise Ackerly Thorn (1867-1961), and Edward Henry Floyd-Jones (1869-1930).

In 1869, Edward and his family went back to Stockton, but when Mary died in 1874 they returned to Long Island, settling in Edward's hometown of Massapequa. He became active in local politics, serving as Supervisor of Oyster Bay. He was a member of the Democratic Party.

In 1891, he was elected to the New York State Senate, where he represented the 1st District (Queens and Suffolk counties). He was a member of the State Senate in 1892 and 1893.

Edward died on January 23, 1901, in his daughter Louise's home on 35 East 63rd St. He was buried in Floyd-Jones family cemetery on the Grace Church Complex in Massapequa.

== Sources ==
- "Edward Floyd-Jones: The Democratic Nominee for Senator From the First District" in The Brooklyn Times on October 28, 1891.
- The New York Red Book. United States, Williams Press, 1892. pp. 86–87.
- "Edward Floyd-Jones Dead" in The New York Times on January 24, 1901.
- Genealogies of the State of New York: A Record of the Achievements of Her People in the Making of a Commonwealth and the Founding of a Nation. United States, Lewis Historical Publishing Company, 1915. P. 557.

New York State Senate
Preceded by Edward Hawkins (New York politician)	New York State Senate; 1st District; 1892–1893	Succeeded by John Lewis Childs
