= General Myers =

General Myers may refer to:

- John Twiggs Myers (1871–1952), U.S. Marine Corps lieutenant general
- Richard Myers (born 1942), U.S. Air Force four-star general
- Sir William Myers, 1st Baronet (1750/51–1805), British Army lieutenant general

== See also ==
- Albert J. Myer (1828–1880), U.S. Army brigadier general
- Attorney General Myers (disambiguation)
