= James Rider =

American politician (1797–1876)

Member of the New York Senate from the 1st district
- In office 1856–1857
- Preceded by: Hugh Halsey
- Succeeded by: Joshua B. Smith

Member of the New York State Assembly from the Queens County district
- In office 1855–1855
- Preceded by: John A. Searing
- Succeeded by: Seaman N. Snedeker

Personal details
- Born: March 5, 1797 Springfield, Queens County, New York, U.S.
- Died: April 30, 1876 (aged 79) Jamaica, Queens County, New York, U.S.
- Resting place: Prospect Cemetery, Jamaica, Queens
- Party: Republican
- Spouse: Margaret Rhodes (m. 1818)
- Occupation: Farmer, politician

James Rider (March 5, 1797 – April 30, 1876) was an American farmer and politician from New York. He served in the New York State Assembly in 1855 and in the New York State Senate from 1856 to 1857.

== Early life ==
Rider was born on March 5, 1797, in Springfield, Queens County, New York. He was the son of John Rider (c. 1766–1846) and Antje (Van Nostrand) Rider (b. 1765).

On November 17, 1818, he married Margaret Rhodes.

== Career ==
In addition to his political career, Rider was a farmer by occupation. He served as Treasurer of the Merrick and Jamaica Plank Road Company from 1852 to 1854. The plank road company was responsible for constructing and maintaining a toll road that connected the communities of Merrick and Jamaica, facilitating trade and travel in western Long Island.

== Political career ==
A Republican, Rider was a member of the New York State Assembly (Queens County) in 1855. He was elected to the Assembly in the November 1854 election.

He was a member of the New York State Senate (1st District) in 1856 and 1857. In the Senate, he succeeded Hugh Halsey and was succeeded by Joshua B. Smith.

== Death ==
Rider died on April 30, 1876, at his home in Jamaica, Queens County, New York, at the age of 79. He was buried at Prospect Cemetery in Jamaica, Queens.

New York State Assembly
Preceded by John A. Searing	New York State Assembly; Queens County; 1855	Succeeded by Seaman N. Snedeker
New York State Senate
Preceded by Hugh Halsey	New York State Senate; 1st District; 1856–1857	Succeeded by Joshua B. Smith
