= Henry E. Davies (judge) =

American judge

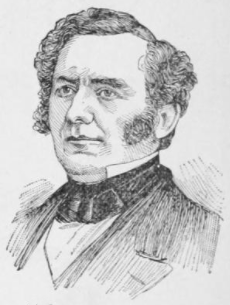

Chief Judge of the New York Court of Appeals
- In office 1866–1867

Personal details
- Born: Henry Ebenezer Davies; February 8, 1808 Black Lake, New York
- Died: December 17, 1881 (aged 73) New York, New York
- Party: Whig
- Spouse: Rebecca Waldo Tappan (m. 1835)
- Children: 6, including Henry Eugene Davies
- Occupation: Lawyer, politician

Henry Ebenezer Davies (February 8, 1805 – December 17, 1881) was an American lawyer and politician from New York. He was Chief Judge of the New York Court of Appeals from 1866 to 1867.

== Life ==
He was born in Black Lake, near Ogdensburg, St. Lawrence County, New York, the son of Thomas J. Davies and Ruth (Foot) Davies (c. 1772–1852). He was educated in the public schools, and at age 14 went to live with Judge Alfred Conkling in whose office he studied law, and was admitted to the bar in 1826. He commenced practice in Buffalo, New York and entered politics as a Whig.

In 1830, he moved to New York City, and practiced law in partnership with Samuel A. Foote, who was later a judge. In 1835, Davies married Rebecca Waldo Tappan, daughter of John Tappan (brother of Lewis Tappan, Benjamin Tappan and Arthur Tappan), and they had six children, among them Henry Eugene Davies.

In 1840, he was a Whig alderman of the New York Common Council. In 1848, he dissolved the partnership with Foote, and formed a new one with William Kent (son of Chancellor James Kent). In May 1849, Davies was appointed Corporation Counsel of New York City, to fill the vacancy caused by the resignation of Willis Hall. In November 1849, he was elected to succeed himself, and remained in office until the end of 1852.

He was a friend of Millard Fillmore, and was his confidential adviser during his term as U.S. president.

In 1855, he was elected to the New York Supreme Court to fill the vacancy caused by the death of Justice Robert H. Morris, and remained on the Supreme Court bench until the end of 1859.

In 1859, he was elected to the Court of Appeals on the Republican and American tickets, defeating the Democratic incumbent Alexander S. Johnson. Davies was an associate judge of the Court of Appeals from 1860 to 1865, and Chief Judge from 1866 to 1867.

He died on December 17, 1881, at his residence at 60 West Fifty-first Street in New York City. He was buried at the St. Luke's Episcopal Church cemetery in Beacon, New York, the same place where Chancellor James Kent (1763–1847) is buried.

== See also ==
- George G. Barnard

Legal offices
Preceded by Hiram Denio	Chief Judge of the New York Court of Appeals; 1866–1867	Succeeded by William B. Wright
