= Edward A. Lawrence =

American politician (1831–1883)

Member of the New York Senate from the 1st district
- In office 1860–1861
- Preceded by: Joshua B. Smith
- Succeeded by: Monroe Henderson

Member of the New York State Assembly from the Queens County's 1st district
- In office 1858–1859
- Preceded by: David R. Floyd-Jones (redistricting)
- Succeeded by: Stephen Taber

Personal details
- Born: Edward Arthur Lawrence; November 2, 1831 Bay Side, Queens County, New York, U.S.
- Died: June 4, 1883 (aged 51)
- Resting place: Lawrence Burying Ground, Bayside, Queens
- Party: Democratic
- Spouse: Hannah Russell Mickle (m. 1855)
- Relatives: Andrew H. Mickle (father-in-law); Solomon Townsend (grandfather); Samuel Townsend (great-grandfather)
- Occupation: Politician

Edward Arthur Lawrence (November 2, 1831 – June 4, 1883) was an American politician from New York. He served in the New York State Assembly from 1858 to 1859 and in the New York State Senate from 1860 to 1861.

== Life ==
Lawrence was born on November 2, 1831, in Bay Side, Queens County, New York. He was the son of Effingham Lawrence (1779–1850), First Judge of the Queens County Court from 1818 to 1823, and Ann (Townsend) Lawrence (1786–1845).

Assemblyman Solomon Townsend (1746–1811) was his grandfather, and State Senator Samuel Townsend (d. 1790) was his great-grandfather.

On December 7, 1855, he married Hannah Russell Mickle (b. 1837), daughter of Mayor of New York Andrew H. Mickle (1805–1863).

== Political career ==
As a Democrat, Lawrence served as Supervisor of the Town of Flushing for twelve years.

In 1857, the New York State Legislature divided Queens County into two assembly districts. David R. Floyd-Jones had represented Queens County as a single at‑large district in the Assembly in 1857. Lawrence was elected to represent the newly created 1st District in the 1858 and 1859 sessions, succeeding Floyd‑Jones in the sense that the county's representation was redistricted. He was the first person to hold this new seat.

He was a member of the New York State Senate (1st District) in 1860 and 1861.

== Death ==
Lawrence died on June 4, 1883. He was buried at the Lawrence Burying Ground in Bayside, Queens.

New York State Assembly
| Preceded by David R. Floyd-Jones (redistricting) | New York State Assembly; Queens County, 1st District; 1858–1859 | Succeeded by Stephen Taber |
New York State Senate
| Preceded by Joshua B. Smith | New York State Senate; 1st District; 1860–1861 | Succeeded by Monroe Henderson |
