= Frederick Hollister =

American businessman and politician

Frederick Hollister (March 17, 1812 - December 16, 1863) was an American businessman and politician who served as Mayor of Utica, New York for 10 years from 1843 to 1844.

== Political career ==
A resident of Utica, New York for many years, Hollister was elected mayor of Utica, as a Whig, in 1843. Serving as mayor from 1843–1844, he defeated future presidential candidate Horatio Seymour by 16 votes.

== Business career ==
As a businessman, he amassed a large fortune in textile manufacturing, drug stores and railroad concerns. Among other businesses, Hollister founded the Standard Silk Company and the Clayville Woolen Mills. He purchased the site of Washington Mills, New York in 1840 from Isaac Mason. The mill built on the site by Hollister was painted in his signature checkerboard pattern (a drug store in Utica was known as "the checkered store.") Because of the colors of the mill, the local name for the mill site was "Checkerville." After a second stone mill built by Hollister was destroyed by fire, he built a large frame mill on the site, giving it the name of "Washington Mill."

== Personal life ==
Hollister married Jane M. Stanton, daughter of George W. Stanton of Albany NY, in 1835.

== Death ==
Hollister died in New York City on December 16, 1863.
