= Isaac V. Vanderpoel =

American lawyer and politician (1814-1871)

New York State Treasurer
- In office 1858–1859
- Governor: John A. King; Edwin D. Morgan
- Preceded by: Stephen Clark
- Succeeded by: Philip Dorsheimer

Personal details
- Born: 1814 Kinderhook, New York
- Died: March 25, 1871 (aged 56) Buffalo, New York
- Party: Democratic Party
- Parent: Benjamin Vanderpoel
- Education: Kinderhook Academy

Isaac V. Vanderpoel (1814 – March 25, 1871) was an American lawyer and politician. Vanderpoel was a Democratic party mainstay and from 1866 to 1869, had a law partnership with the eventual U.S. President Grover Cleveland.

== Life ==
He was born in 1814 in Kinderhook, Columbia County, New York, the son of Benjamin Vanderpoel. The Vanderpoel family was one of the oldest families in the state. Isaac's great-grandfather emigrated from Holland as early as 1609 and settled on Long Island, becoming one of the earliest residents of what is now the State of New York.

He was educated at Kinderhook Academy where his classmates and friends included the Isaac A. Verplanck of Buffalo and H. H. Van Dyck of Albany.

== Career ==
Vanderpoel studied law at the office of J. & A. Vanderpoel in Kinderhook. After four years, he went to New York City to complete his legal studies and was admitted to the office of Price & Sears, a well known firm at the time. In 1834, during the October term of the Supreme Court, he was admitted to the bar. Immediately, he moved to the town of Aurora, New York in Erie county where he became a partner of P. M. Vosburgh, who later became Erie County Clerk. After practicing in Aurora for two years, he went to Buffalo and formed a law partnership with Frederick P. Stevens, who later became the Mayor of Buffalo from 1856 to 1857.

From 1837 to 1845, he was appointed Brigade Inspector of the 47th Regiment of the New York State Militia during the Patriot War, by Gov. Marcy. He served as Adjutant General of New York from 1854 to 1855; he succeeded Robert E. Temple and was succeeded by John Watts de Peyster.

He was a delegate to state conventions twelve different times from Erie County in the Democratic party. He was New York State Treasurer from 1858 to 1859, elected on the Democratic ticket at the New York state election, 1857, and defeated for re-election at the New York state election, 1859.

In January 1866, he formed Vanderpoel & Cleveland, a law partnership with Grover Cleveland in Buffalo, which was dissolved in August 1869 when Vanderpoel was elected Police Justice of Buffalo. In 1871, Cleveland was Sheriff of Erie County, mayor of Buffalo in 1882, Governor of New York in 1883 and finally the 22nd and 24th President of the United States in 1885 and 1893, respectively. In 1884, while Governor of New York, Cleveland pursued Vanderpoel's relative, Aaron J. Vanderpoel, as the New York Attorney General. Aaron J. Vanderpoel was taught law by his uncle, another Vanderpoel relative, Aaron Vanderpoel, former member of the United States House of Representatives from New York's 8th congressional district 1833-1837 and again in 1839–1841.

== Personal life ==
Vanderpoel died on March 25, 1871, in Buffalo, New York.

Political offices
Preceded by Stephen Clark	New York State Treasurer; 1858–1859	Succeeded by Philip Dorsheimer
