= Seaman N. Snedeker =

American politician from New York (1826–1895)

Member of the New York State Assembly from Queens County
- In office 1856–1856
- Preceded by: James Rider
- Succeeded by: David R. Floyd-Jones

Personal details
- Born: March 29, 1826 Hempstead, Queens County, New York, U.S.
- Died: February 2, 1895 (aged 68) Hempstead, Queens County, New York, U.S.
- Spouse: Elizabeth A. Weeks (m. 1845)
- Children: 12

Seaman N. Snedeker (March 29, 1826 – February 2, 1895) was an American politician from New York. He served as a member of the New York State Assembly in 1856, representing Queens County.

== Early life ==
Snedeker was born on March 29, 1826, in Hempstead, Queens County, New York. (Note: The Ancestry record provides genealogical details; it is not a primary source but is consistent with other records.) He was the son of Stephen Carman Snedeker and Elizabeth Seaman.

On December 17, 1845, he married Elizabeth A. Weeks. They had twelve children.

== Political career ==
Snedeker was elected to the New York State Assembly and served in the 1856 session, representing Queens County.

== Later life and death ==
Snedeker died on February 2, 1895, in Hempstead, Queens County, New York, at the age of 68. His burial location is unknown.

== Notes ==
New York State Assembly
Preceded by James Rider	New York State Assembly; Queens County; 1856	Succeeded by David R. Floyd-Jones
