= Monroe Henderson =

American politician (1818–1899)

Monroe Henderson (1818 in Watertown, Jefferson County, New York – December 5, 1899 in Jamaica, Queens, New York City) was an American merchant and politician from New York.

== Life ==
He was the son of Thomas Monroe Henderson. In 1842, he removed to Long Island. There he first worked as a clerk, and later became a merchant. In 1856, he traveled for about a year to Kansas to improve his health.

He was a member of the New York State Senate (1st D.) in 1862 and 1863, but due to ill health he abandoned the 85th Session on January 31, and did not take his seat during the 86th Session.

He died at the home of his niece at 54 Union Ave., in Jamaica, Queens.

== Sources ==
- The New York Civil List compiled by Franklin Benjamin Hough, Stephen C. Hutchins and Edgar Albert Werner (1870; pg. 443)
- Biographical Sketches of the State Officers and the Members of the Legislature of the State of New York in 1862 and '63 by William D. Murphy (1863; pg. 77f)
- DEATH LIST OF A DAY; Monroe Henderson in NYT on December 6, 1899

New York State Senate
Preceded by Edward A. Lawrence	New York State Senate; 1st District; 1862–1863	Succeeded by Robert Christie Jr.
