= Horatio Seymour =

Governor of New York (1853–1854; 1863–1864)

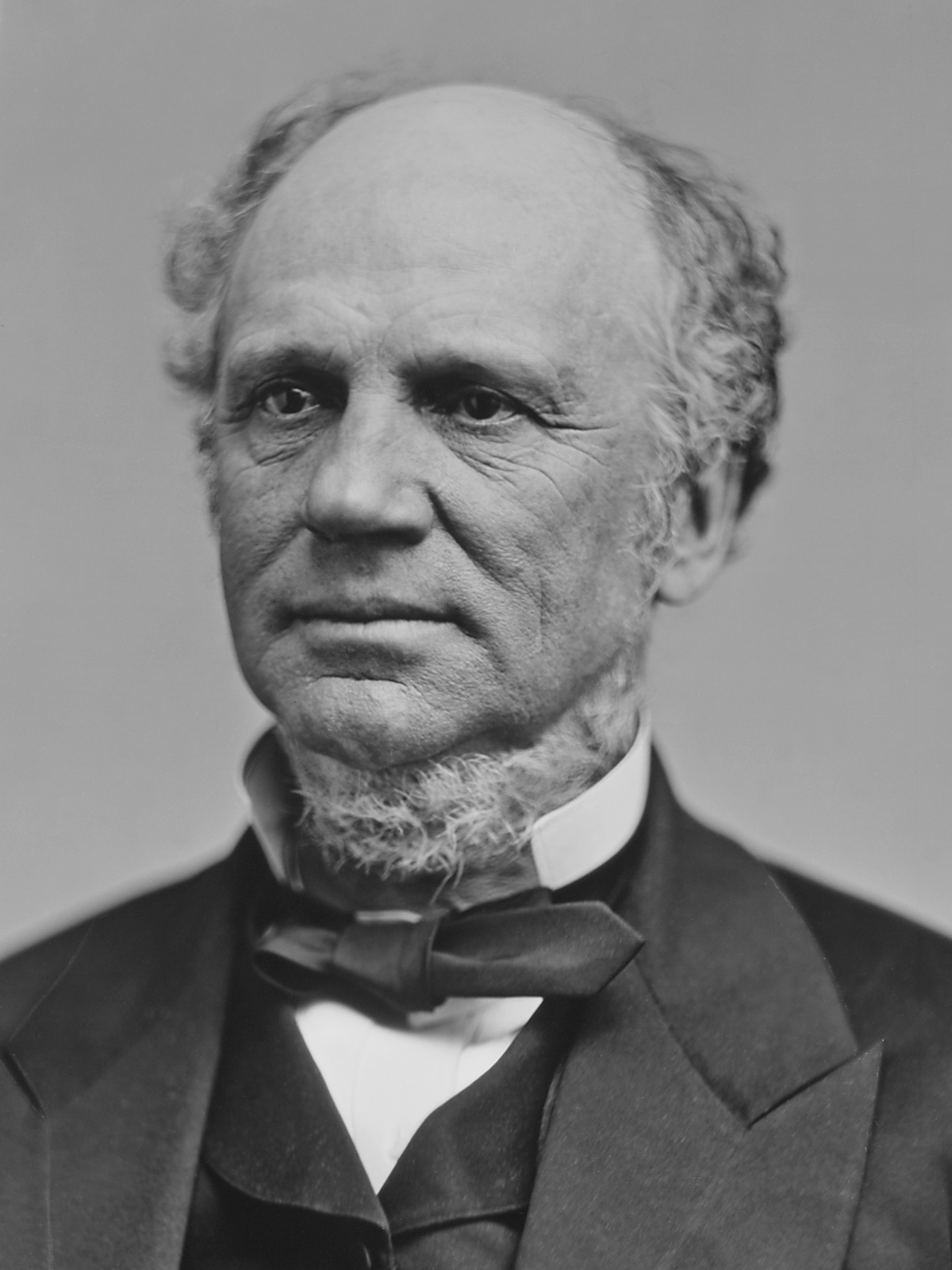
- Portrait by Mathew Brady, c. 1860–1865

18th Governor of New York
- In office January 1, 1863 – December 31, 1864
- Lieutenant: David R. Floyd-Jones
- Preceded by: Edwin D. Morgan
- Succeeded by: Reuben Fenton
- In office January 1, 1853 – December 31, 1854
- Lieutenant: Sanford E. Church
- Preceded by: Washington Hunt
- Succeeded by: Myron H. Clark

Speaker of the New York State Assembly
- In office January 7, 1845 – December 31, 1845
- Preceded by: Elisha Litchfield
- Succeeded by: William C. Crain

Member of the New York State Assembly from Oneida County
- In office January 1, 1844 – December 31, 1845 (Note: Serving with: 1844: Justus Childs, James Douglass, Richard Empey 1854: Andrew Billings, Merit Brooks, Calvert Comstock)
- Preceded by: Multi-member district (Note: Dan P. Cadwell, Amos S. Fassett, David Murray, John H. Tower)
- Succeeded by: Multi-member district (Note: Chauncey C. Cook, Benjamin F. Cooper, Daniel G. Dorrance, Russel Fuller)
- In office January 1, 1842 – January 31, 1842 (Note: Serving with: Ichabod C. Baker, Ebenezer Robbins, DeWitt C. Stephens)
- Preceded by: Multi-member district (Note: Calvin Dawley, Joseph Halleck, Luke Hitchcock, Nathaniel Odell)
- Succeeded by: Multi-member district (Note: Dan P. Cadwell, Amos S. Fassett, David Murray, John H. Tower)

9th Mayor of Utica
- In office 1842–1843
- Preceded by: Spencer Kellogg
- Succeeded by: Frederick Hollister

Personal details
- Born: May 31, 1810 Pompey, New York, U.S.
- Died: February 12, 1886 (aged 75) New York City, U.S.
- Resting place: Forest Hill Cemetery; Utica, New York, U.S.
- Party: Democratic
- Spouse: Mary Bleecker
- Relations: Henry Seymour (father); Origen S. Seymour (cousin); Horatio Seymour (uncle); Edward W. Seymour (nephew); Horatio Seymour Jr. (nephew)
- Education: Hobart College; Norwich University (BA)
- Profession: Politician; attorney; businessman

Horatio Seymour (May 31, 1810 – February 12, 1886) was an American politician. He served as the eighteenth Governor of New York from 1853 to 1854 and again from 1863 to 1864. He was the Democratic Party nominee for president in the 1868 United States presidential election, losing to Republican Ulysses S. Grant.

Born in Pompey, New York, Seymour was admitted to the New York bar in 1832. He primarily focused on managing his family's business interests. After serving as a military secretary to Governor William L. Marcy, Seymour won election to the New York State Assembly. He was elected that body's speaker in 1845 and aligned with Marcy's "Softshell Hunker" faction. Seymour was nominated for governor in 1850 but narrowly lost to the Whig candidate, Washington Hunt. He defeated Hunt in the 1852 gubernatorial election, and spent much of his tenure trying to reunify the fractured Democratic Party, losing his 1854 re-election campaign in part due to this disunity.

Despite this defeat, Seymour emerged as a prominent national figure within the party. As several Southern states threatened secession, Seymour supported the Crittenden Compromise as a way to avoid civil war. He supported the Union war effort during the Civil War but criticized President Abraham Lincoln's leadership. He won election to another term as governor in 1862 and continued to oppose many of Lincoln's policies. Several delegates at the 1864 Democratic National Convention hoped to nominate Seymour for president, but Seymour declined to seek the nomination. Beset by various issues, he narrowly lost re-election in 1864. After the war, Seymour supported President Andrew Johnson's Reconstruction policies.

As the 1868 Democratic National Convention opened, there was no clear front-runner for the Democratic presidential nomination, but Seymour remained widely popular. Serving as the chairman of the convention, as he had in 1864, Seymour refused to seek the nomination for himself. After twenty-two indecisive ballots, the convention nominated Seymour, who finally relented on his opposition to running for president. Seymour faced General Ulysses S. Grant, the widely popular Republican Party nominee, in the 1868 election. Grant won a strong majority of the electoral vote, though his margin in the popular vote was not as overwhelming. Seymour never again sought public office but remained active in politics and supported Grover Cleveland's 1884 campaign for president.

== Early life and education ==
Seymour was born in Pompey Hill, Onondaga County, New York in 1810. His father was Henry Seymour, a merchant and politician; his mother, Mary Ledyard Forman (1785–1859), of Matawan, New Jersey, was the daughter of General Jonathan Forman and Mary Ledyard. He was one of six children, and his sister Julia Catherine became the wife of Roscoe Conkling. At the age of 10 he moved with the rest of his family to Utica, where he attended a number of local schools, including Geneva College (later Hobart College). In the autumn of 1824 he was sent to the American Literary, Scientific & Military Academy (Norwich University). Upon his return to Utica after graduating in 1828, Seymour read for the law in the offices of Greene Bronson and Samuel Beardsley. Though admitted to the bar in 1832, he did not enjoy work as an attorney and was primarily preoccupied with politics and managing his family's business interests. He married Mary Bleecker in 1835.

== Political career ==
=== Entry into politics ===
Seymour's first role in politics came in 1833, when he was named aide-de-camp to the state's newly elected Democratic governor, William L. Marcy with the rank of colonel. In 1835, he succeeded Thomas W. Harman as Marcy's military secretary. The six years in these positions gave Seymour an invaluable education in the politics of the state, and established a firm friendship between the two men. In 1839 he returned to Utica to take over the management of his family's estate in the aftermath of his father's suicide two years earlier, investing profitably in real estate, banks, mines, railroads, and other ventures. In 1841 he won election to the New York State Assembly, and he served simultaneously as mayor of Utica from 1842 to 1843. He won election to the Assembly again in 1843 to 1844, and thanks in part to massive turnover in the ranks of the Democratic caucus he was elected speaker in 1845.

When, in the late 1840s, the New York Democratic Party split between the two factions of Hunkers and Barnburners, Seymour was among those identified with the more conservative Hunker faction, led by Marcy and Senator Daniel S. Dickinson. After this split led to disaster in the election of 1848, when the division between the Hunkers, who supported Lewis Cass, and the Barnburners, who supported their leader, former President Martin Van Buren, Seymour became identified with Marcy's faction within the Hunkers, the so-called "Softshell Hunkers," who hoped to reunite with the Barnburners so as to be able to bring back Democratic dominance within the state.

=== First term as governor ===
In 1850, Seymour was the gubernatorial candidate of the reunited Democratic Party, but he narrowly lost to the Whig candidate, Washington Hunt. Seymour and the Softs supported the candidacy of their leader, Marcy, for the presidency in 1852, but when he was defeated they enthusiastically campaigned for Franklin Pierce in 1852. That year proved a good one for the Softs, as Seymour, again supported by a unified Democratic Party, narrowly defeated Hunt in a gubernatorial rematch, while Pierce, overwhelmingly elected president, appointed Marcy as his Secretary of State.

Seymour's first term as governor of New York proved turbulent. He won approval of a measure to finance the enlargement of the Erie Canal via a $10.5 million loan in a special election in February 1854. But much of his tenure was plagued by factional chaos within the state Democratic Party. The Pierce administration's use of the patronage power alienated the Hards, who determined to run their own gubernatorial candidate against Seymour in 1854. Furthermore, the administration's support of the unpopular Kansas–Nebraska Act, with which Seymour was associated indirectly through his friendship with Marcy, cost him many votes. Whigs controlling the state legislature also sought to injure him further politically by responding to his call for action on the problem of alcohol abuse with a bill establishing a statewide prohibition, which Seymour vetoed as unconstitutional. Yet for all his troubles Seymour's prospects for reelection looked promising, as the divisions of the Democrats' opponents between the regular Whig candidate, Myron H. Clark, and the Know-Nothing Daniel Ullman appeared to be more dangerous to the Democrats' opponents than the candidacy of the Hard Greene C. Bronson looked to Democratic unity. In the end, however, the anti-Democratic tide was too strong, and in the four-way race Clark, who received only one-third of the vote, defeated Seymour by 309 votes.

=== Interlude ===
Horatio Seymour, c. 1860

Despite his defeat, as a former governor of the largest state of the Union, Seymour emerged as a prominent figure in party politics at the national level. In 1856, he was considered a possible compromise presidential candidate in the event of a deadlock between Franklin Pierce and James Buchanan until he wrote a letter definitively ruling himself out. In 1860, some considered Seymour a compromise candidate for the Democratic nomination at the reconvening convention in Baltimore. Seymour wrote a letter to the editor of his local newspaper declaring unreservedly that he was not candidate for either president or vice president. Seymour supported the candidacy of Stephen A. Douglas for the presidency in both 1856 and 1860. In 1861, he accepted nomination as the Democratic candidate for the United States Senate, which was largely an empty honor as the Republican majorities in the state legislature rendered a Republican victory a foregone conclusion.

In the secession crisis following Abraham Lincoln's election in 1860, Seymour strongly endorsed the proposed Crittenden Compromise. After the start of the Civil War, Seymour took a cautious middle position within his party, supporting the war effort but criticizing Lincoln's conduct of the war. Seymour was especially critical of Lincoln's wartime centralization of power and restrictions on civil liberties, as well as his support for emancipation.

=== Second term as governor ===
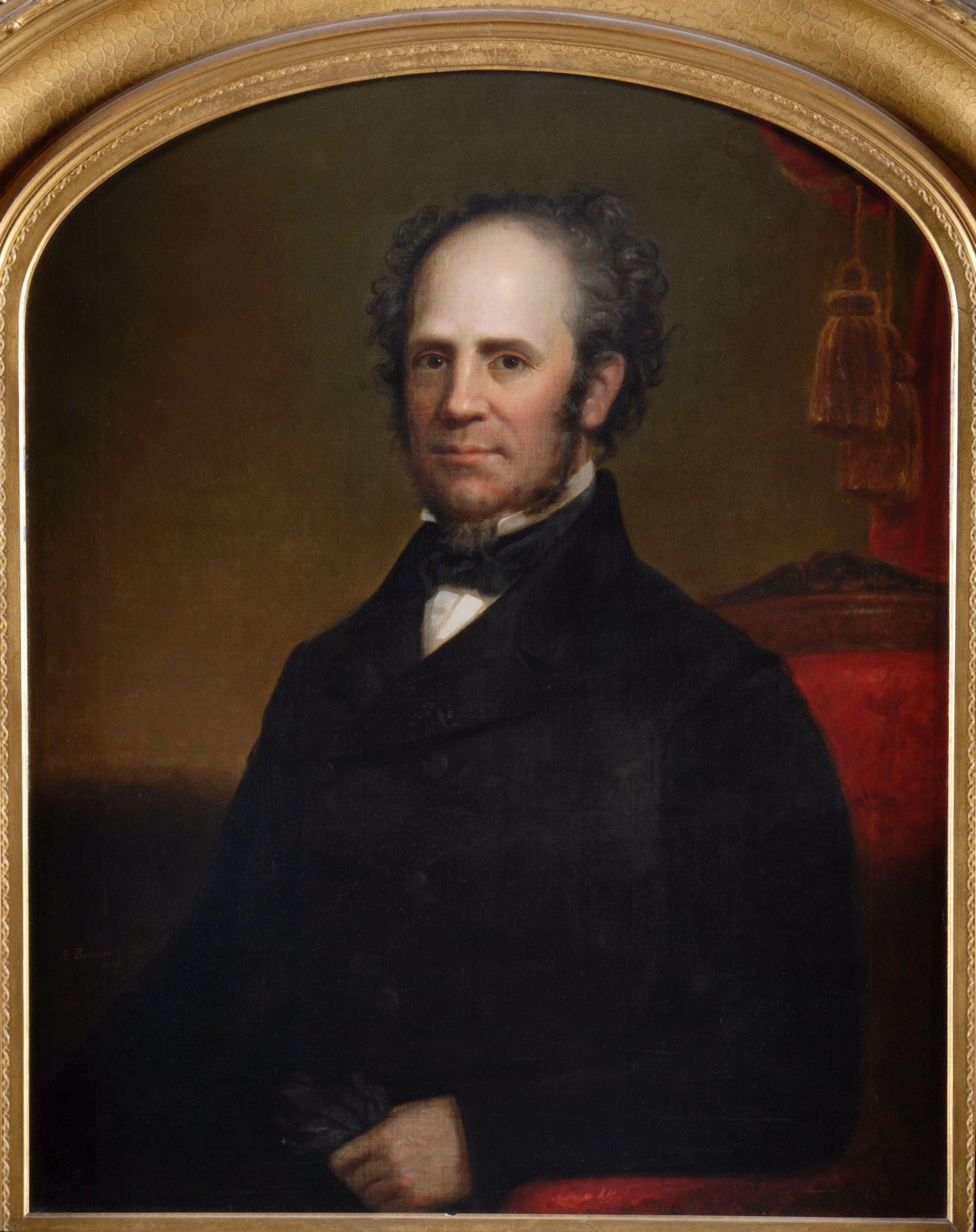
Gubernatorial portrait of Horatio Seymour

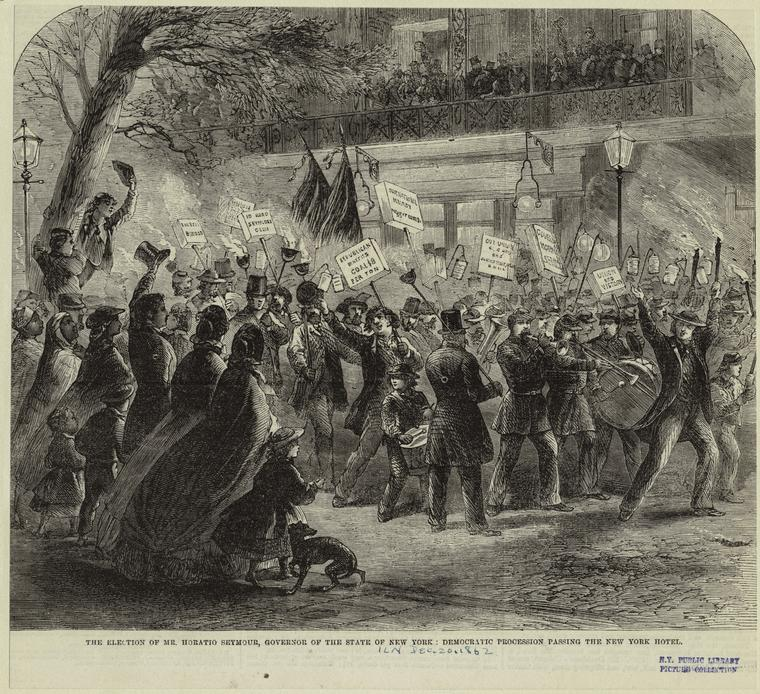
Campaign rally celebrating Seymour's election

In 1862, the sitting governor, Republican Edwin D. Morgan, announced that he would not run for an additional term. Recognizing the symbolic importance of a victory in New York, the Democratic Party nominated Seymour as the strongest candidate available. Though Seymour accepted the nomination with reluctance, he threw himself into the election, campaigning across the state in the hope that a Democratic victory would restrain the actions of the Radical Republicans in Washington. He won a close race against the Republican candidate James S. Wadsworth, one of a series of victories by the Democratic ticket in the state that year.

Seymour's second term proved to be even more tumultuous than his first one. As governor of the largest state in the Union from 1863 to 1864, Seymour was one of the most prominent Democratic opponents of the President. He opposed the Lincoln administration's institution of the military draft in 1863 on constitutional grounds, an act which led many to question his support for the war. He also opposed a bill giving votes to the soldiers on legal grounds, vetoing the bill when it reached his desk. While not opposed to the goal he preferred to establish voting provisions through a constitutional amendment that was working its way simultaneously through the state legislature; nonetheless, his veto was portrayed by opponents as hostility to the soldiers. His decision to pay the state's foreign creditors using gold rather than greenbacks alienated "easy money" supporters, while his veto of a bill granting traction rights on Broadway in Manhattan earned him the opposition of Tammany Hall. Finally, his efforts to conciliate the rioters during the New York Draft Riots of July 1863 was used against him by the Republicans, who accused him of treason and support for the Confederacy.

The growing accumulation of problems steadily eroded Seymour's position as governor. In what was regarded as a rebuke of his policies, Republicans swept the 1863 state midterm elections, winning all of the major offices and taking control of the State Assembly. In the state elections the following year, Seymour himself was defeated for reelection in a close race by Republican Reuben Fenton.

=== Prominent Democrat ===
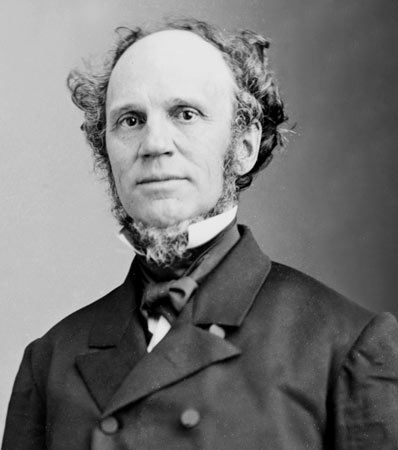
Seymour in an undated photograph

Seymour continued as a prominent figure in national Democratic politics both during and immediately after his second term as governor. In 1864, he served as permanent chairman at the Democratic National Convention, where the opposition of many delegates to the two frontrunners, General George B. McClellan, a War Democrat, and Thomas H. Seymour (no relation to Horatio), a Copperhead, led many to seek out Seymour as a compromise candidate. He refused to be nominated, however, with the nomination ultimately going to McClellan. In the aftermath of the war Seymour joined other Democrats in supporting President Andrew Johnson's Reconstruction policies, and was a strong opponent of Radical Reconstruction, with its emphasis on guaranteeing civil and political rights for freed slaves.

=== 1868 presidential election ===
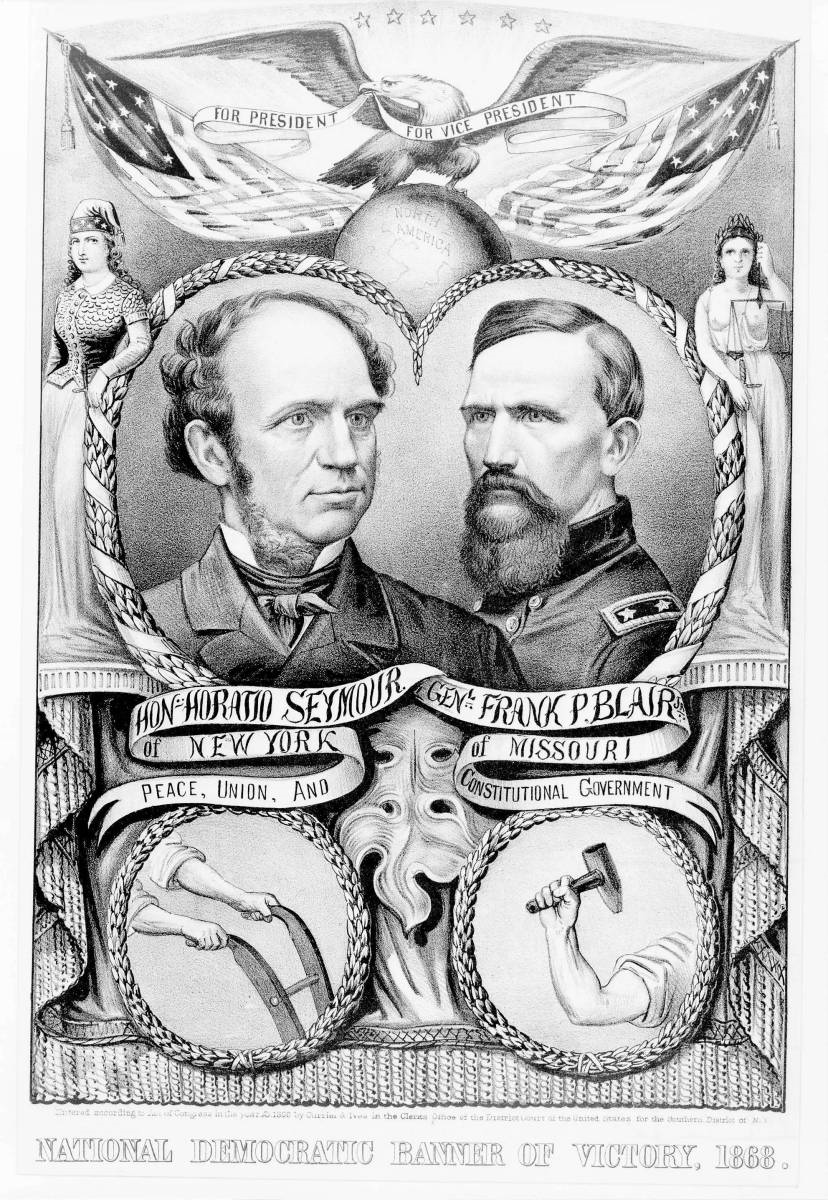
Seymour/Blair campaign poster

==== Nomination ====
As the 1868 presidential election approached, there was no clear candidate for the Democratic nomination. Of the numerous candidates in contention, George H. Pendleton, who had run as the Democratic vice-presidential nominee in 1864, enjoyed considerable support but alienated the fiscal conservatives in the party with his plan to pay off federal debt using greenbacks. When Seymour was approached about running for the nomination, he demurred again, preferring that either Indiana Senator Thomas A. Hendricks or U.S. Chief Justice Salmon P. Chase receive the nomination instead.

At the convention, Seymour once again served as permanent chairman. Balloting began on June 7; on the fourth ballot, the chairman of the North Carolina delegation cast his state's votes for Seymour, whereupon the former governor again restated his refusal to accept the nomination. Two days later, as the twenty-second ballot was being taken, it appeared that Hendricks was in the process of winning the nomination until the leader of the Ohio delegation suddenly switched his delegation's votes to Seymour. Though Seymour reiterated his unwillingness to be the nominee, the delegations revised their votes and gave the nomination to him unanimously.

==== Campaign ====
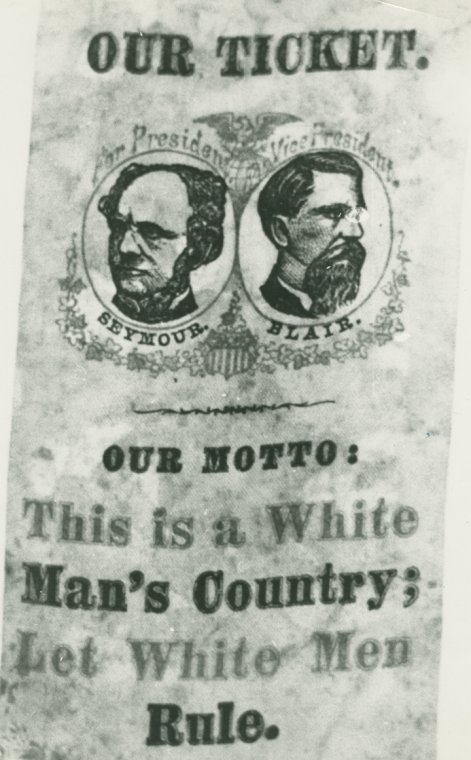
Campaign badge, 1868, from the New York Public Library, Schomberg Collection

With the nomination forced upon him, Seymour committed himself to the campaign. He faced considerable challenges; his opponent, General Ulysses S. Grant, enjoyed the support of a unified Republican party and most of the nation's press. While he generally adhered to the tradition that presidential nominees did not actively campaign, Seymour did undertake a tour of the Midwest and the mid-Atlantic states in mid-October. In his campaign Seymour advocated a policy of conservative, limited government, and he opposed the Reconstruction policies of the Republicans in Congress. Seymour's campaign was also marked by pronounced appeals to racism with repeated attempts to brand General Grant as the "Nigger" candidate and Seymour as the "White Man's" candidate. The Republican campaign, by contrast, was the first in which they "waved the bloody shirt", highlighting Seymour's support for mob violence against African-Americans. Though Seymour ran fairly close to Grant in the popular vote, he was defeated decisively in the electoral vote by a count of 214 to 80. Subsequent to Seymour's loss, the Fifteenth Amendment to the federal Constitution was adopted which not only guaranteed the federal right to vote for recently emancipated men and others of African ancestry but also compelled New York State to reinstate voting rights for such citizens.

== Later years ==
After the presidential election, Seymour remained involved in state politics, though primarily as an elder statesman rather than an active politician. He received a number of honors during this period, including the chancellorship of Union College in 1873. In 1874 he turned down almost certain election to the United States Senate, urging the nomination instead of the eventual choice, Francis Kernan. He refused two additional efforts to nominate him for the New York governorship, in 1876 and 1879, as well as a final attempt to select him as the Democratic presidential nominee in 1880.

Never enjoying robust health, Seymour suffered a permanent decline beginning in 1876. He made a final political effort in 1884 by campaigning for Grover Cleveland's election as president, but deteriorated physically the following year. In 1861 he was elected as a member of the New York Society of the Cincinnati and on July 4, 1885, he was elected to represent his maternal grandfather General Jonathan Forman in the Society of the Cincinnati in the State of New Jersey.

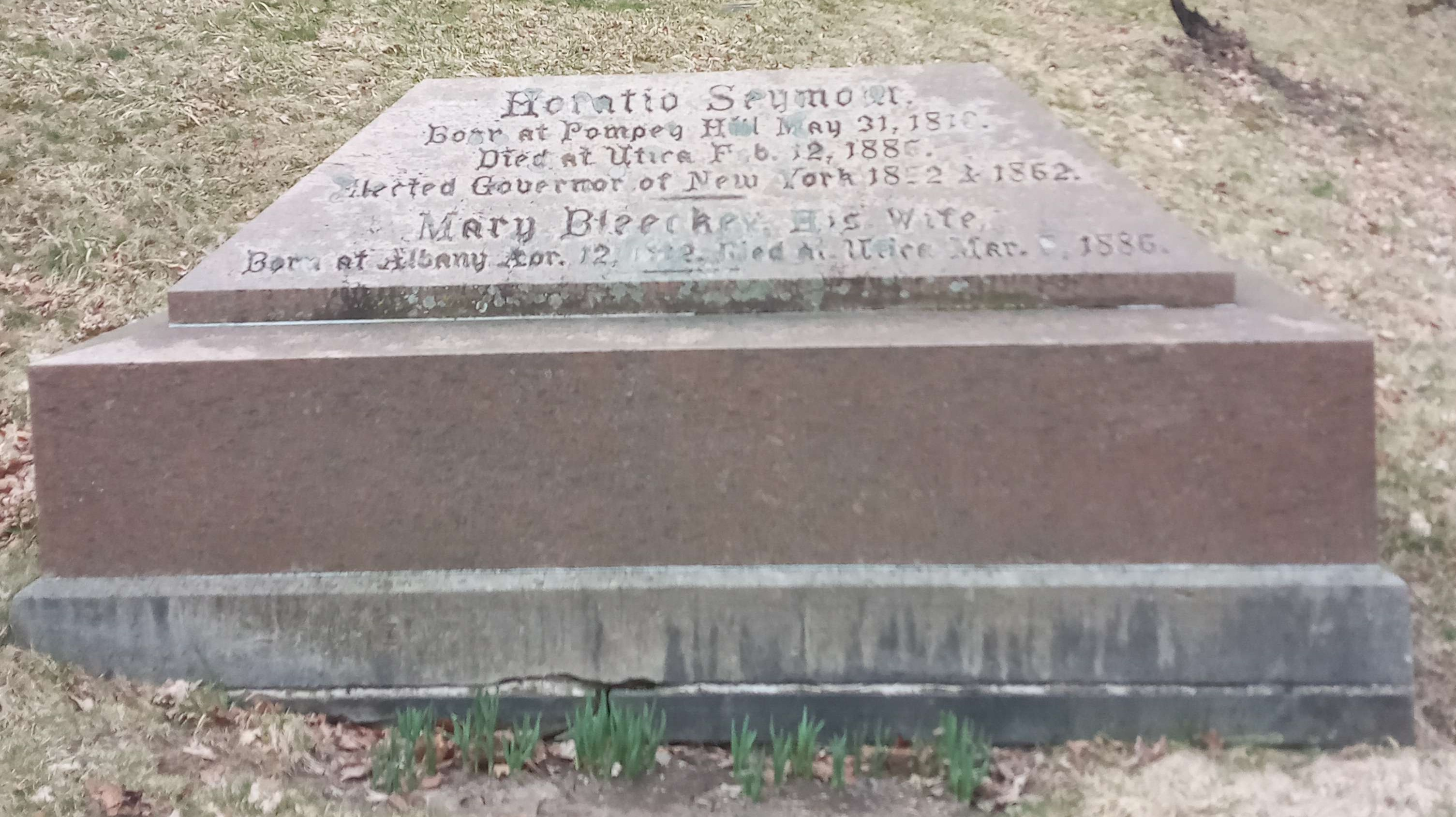
The gravesite of Governor Seymour

In January 1886 his wife Mary suffered an illness. Seymour's own health worsened further. Seymour died in February 1886 and was interred in Forest Hill Cemetery in Utica, New York; Mary died a month later and is buried next to him.

== Legacy ==
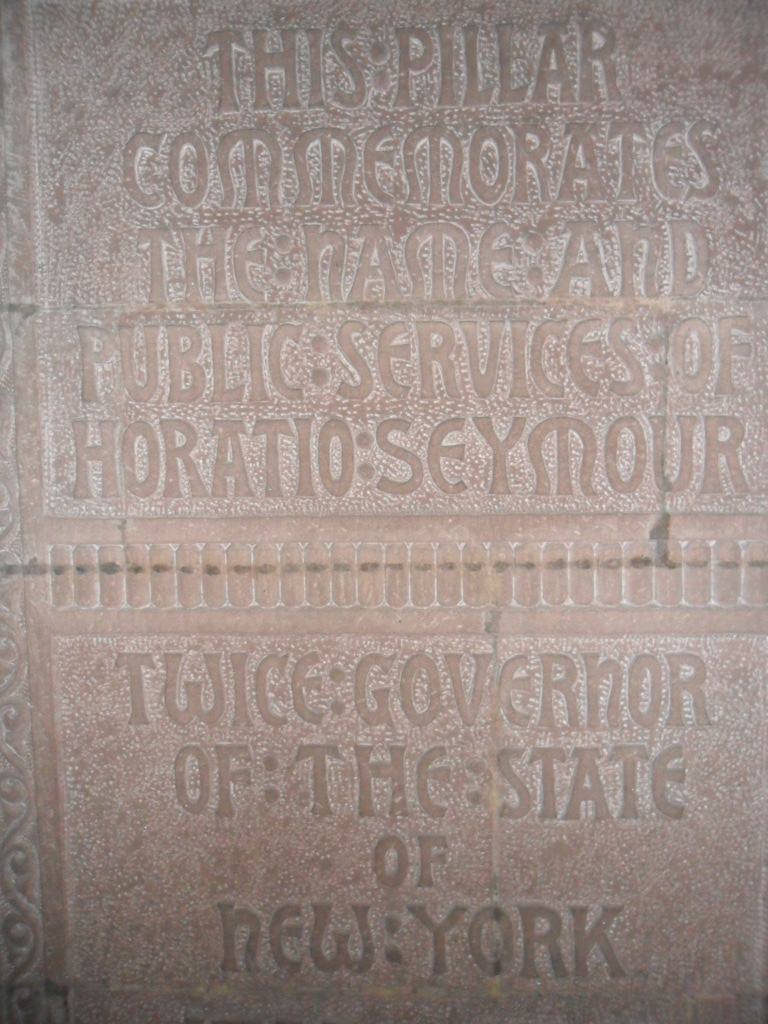
The Horatio Seymour memorial at the Cathedral of All Saints (Albany, New York).

The city of Seymour, Wisconsin, was founded in 1868 and named after Horatio Seymour. Additionally, Seymour is memorialized in the Cathedral of All Saints (Albany, New York), which finished construction in 1888. Seymour Avenue in the Bronx, New York, is also named for him.

== Electoral history ==
=== Gubernatorial elections ===
New York Gubernatorial Election 1850
Party	Candidate	Votes	%	±%
Democratic	Horatio Seymour	214,352	49.57%	+22.87
Whig	Washington Hunt	214,614	49.64%	
Liberty	William Lawrence Chaplin	3,416	0.79%	
Whig hold		Swing		

New York Gubernatorial Election 1852
Party	Candidate	Votes	%	±%
Democratic	Horatio Seymour	264,121	50.31%	+.74
Whig	Washington Hunt (Incumbent)	241,525	46.01%	
Free Soil	Minthorne Tompkins	19,296	3.68%	
Democratic gain from Whig		Swing		

New York Gubernatorial Election 1854
Party	Candidate	Votes	%	±%
Democratic	Horatio Seymour (Incumbent)	156,495	33.32%	−16.99
Whig	Myron H. Clark	156,804	33.38%	
Know Nothing	Daniel Ullman	122,282	26.03%	
Democratic	Greene C. Bronson	33,850	7.21%	
Whig gain from Democratic		Swing		

New York Gubernatorial Election 1862
Party	Candidate	Votes	%	±%
Democratic	Horatio Seymour	306,649	50.89%	+7.08
Republican	James S. Wadsworth	295,897	49.11%	
Democratic gain from Republican		Swing		

New York Gubernatorial Election 1864
Party	Candidate	Votes	%	±%
Democratic	Horatio Seymour (Incumbent)	361,264	49.43%	−1.46
Republican	Reuben Fenton	368,557	50.57%	
Republican gain from Democratic		Swing		

=== 1868 presidential election ===
Electoral results
Presidential candidate	Party	Home state	Popular vote^{(a)}		Electoral vote^{(a)}	Running mate		
Presidential candidate	Party	Home state	Count	Percentage	Electoral vote^{(a)}	Vice-presidential candidate	Home state	Electoral vote^{(a)}
Ulysses S. Grant	Republican	Illinois	3,013,650	52.7%	214	Schuyler Colfax	Indiana	214
Horatio Seymour	Democratic	New York	2,708,744	47.3%	80	Francis Preston Blair Jr.	Missouri	80
Other			46	0.0%	—	Other		—
Total			5,722,440	100%	294			294
Needed to win					148			148

== See also ==
- Seymour-Conkling family

Political offices
Preceded by Elisha Litchfield	Speaker of the New York State Assembly; 1845	Succeeded by William C. Crain
Preceded by Washington Hunt	Governor of New York; 1853–1854	Succeeded by Myron H. Clark
Preceded by Edwin D. Morgan	Governor of New York; 1863–1864	Succeeded by Reuben Fenton
Party political offices
Preceded by Reuben H. Walworth	Democratic nominee for Governor of New York; 1850, 1852, 1854	Succeeded by Amasa J. Parker
Preceded by William Kelly	Democratic nominee for Governor of New York; 1862, 1864	Succeeded by John T. Hoffman
Preceded by George B. McClellan	Democratic nominee for President of the United States; 1868	Succeeded by Horace Greeley
