= William I. Skinner =

American politician

William I. Skinner (October 24, 1812 - February 13, 1891) was an American politician from New York.

== Life ==
He was the son of Josiah Skinner. He lived at Little Falls. He was Sheriff of Herkimer County, New York from 1847 to 1849.

In 1853, he was appointed Superintendent of Canal Repairs for Section 4 of the Erie Canal.

He was a Canal Commissioner from 1860 to 1865, elected in 1859 on the Democratic and American tickets, and re-elected in 1862 on the Democratic ticket.

He was a delegate to the 1864 Democratic National Convention.

== Sources ==
- Canal Appointments in NYT on February 21, 1853 [gives middle initial "J."]
- Election results in A Political Text-book for 1860 compiled by Horace Greeley & John Fitch Cleveland (Tribune Association, 1860)
- The New York Civil List compiled by Franklin Benjamin Hough, Stephen C. Hutchins and Edgar Albert Werner (1867; page 406)
- The New York Civil List compiled by Franklin Benjamin Hough (page 400; Weed, Parsons and Co., 1858)
- Political Graveyard
- Early settlers of Herkimer County
