= Henry Floyd-Jones =

American politician

Henry Onderdonk Floyd-Jones (January 3, 1792 — December 20, 1862) was an American politician from New York.

== Life ==
He was born at the family mansion on the Fort Neck estate in South Oyster Bay, New York (then Queens, now Nassau County) as the son of David Richard Floyd-Jones (1764–1826) and Sarah (Onderdonk) Floyd-Jones (1758–1844). He married Helen Watts (1792–1872), and they had several children, among them State Senator Edward Floyd-Jones (1823–1901) and Col. DeLancey Floyd-Jones (1826–1902).

He was a member of the New York State Assembly (Queens Co.) in 1829 and 1830.

He was a member of the New York State Senate (1st D.) from 1836 to 1839, sitting in the 59th, 60th, 61st and 62nd New York State Legislatures.

Lt. Gov. David R. Floyd-Jones (1813–1871) was his nephew; Bishop William H. DeLancey (1797–1865) and Susan DeLancey, the wife of James Fenimore Cooper (1789–1851), were his first cousins.

== Sources ==
- The New York Civil List compiled by Franklin Benjamin Hough (pages 130ff, 142, 208 and 284; Weed, Parsons and Co., 1858)
- Floyd-Jones family
- Memorial of the Hon. David S. Jones (1849; pg. 97ff)
- Sarah Floyd-Jones obit of his daughter, in NYT on August 12, 1900

New York State Assembly
Preceded by Thomas Tredwell	New York State Assembly; Queens Co. 1829	Succeeded by Thomas Tredwell
Preceded by Thomas Tredwell	New York State Assembly; Queens Co. 1830	Succeeded by Thomas Tredwell
New York State Senate
Preceded by Harman B. Cropsey	New York State Senate; First District (Class 1); 1836–1839	Succeeded by Minthorne Tompkins
