= Stephen Clark (New York treasurer) =

American politician (1792–1871)

New York State Treasurer
- In office 1856–1857
- Preceded by: Elbridge G. Spaulding
- Succeeded by: Isaac V. Vanderpoel

Personal details
- Born: February 22, 1792 Malta, New York
- Died: April 20, 1871 (aged 79) Albany County, New York
- Party: American Party
- Spouse(s): Pamela Clark (1801-1842); Sarah Lousia Clark (1810-1898)
- Children: 5

Stephen Clark (February 22, 1792 – April 20, 1871) was an American politician who served as the 23rd Treasurer of New York State.

== Biography ==
He was a contractor and participated in the re-construction of the Long Bridge over the Potomac River which opened in 1835; and the construction of the High Bridge in New York City which opened in 1848.

He was a canal commissioner from 1842 to 1844, and from 1845 to 1847. He was first elected by the New York State Legislature on February 8, 1842, when the Democratic majority removed the Whig commissioners. Clark and James Hooker, the two "non-acting" commissioners (the ones which did not receive an annual salary; the "acting" commissioners received $2,000 a year), were legislated out of office on May 6, 1844. Clark was re-elected to a four-year term in November 1844 to take office on February 3, 1845. He was legislated out of office again by the New York State Constitution of 1846, and left the Canal Commission at the end of 1847.

He was elected New York State Treasurer on the American Party ticket in November 1855, defeating both the Republican and Democratic candidates, and took office on January 1, 1856. At the time, the governor served a two-year term elected in even years, and the cabinet officers a two-year term elected in odd years, so that Governor Myron H. Clark, elected as a Whig but now a Republican, had to cope with a hostile majority in the Erie Canal Board at a time when the political situation was very unstable and party feelings rose high. In June 1856, a majority of the Canal Board, including Treasurer Clark, exchanged the workplace of two resident engineers attached to the canal. The members of the Canal Board, including the treasurer, were accused by Lt. Gov. Henry J. Raymond and State Engineer Silas Seymour of having committed an illegal act, having meddled in the exclusive competences of the State Engineer. On June 23, 1856, Treasurer Clark was suspended by Governor Clark, since the State Constitution provided for the possible suspension of the treasurer but not the other state officers. Soon after, the treasurer answered the accusation in a letter to the Governor, arguing that the Canal Board had powers to supersede the state engineer, and that the treasurer could not be suspended for acts committed as an ex officio member of any executive board, but only for his acts as Treasurer regarding the public funds, and the suspension was revoked.

== Personal life ==
He lived at Albany, New York. On February 4, 1818, he married Pamelia Fay (1801–1842), and they had five children. Clark died on April 20, 1871, and was buried at Albany Rural Cemetery in Menands, New York.

== Sources ==
- Political Graveyard
- The American Party ticket, in The New York Times on October 18, 1855
- Charges before the Governor, in The New York Times on June 23, 1856
- Suspension by the Governor, in The New York Times on June 24, 1856
- The controversy over the Treasurer's suspension, and Clark's answer to the Governor, in The New York Times on July 11, 1856
- The New York Civil List compiled by Franklin Benjamin Hough (pages 35f and 42; Weed, Parsons and Co., 1858)
- Fay Genealogy (1898; page 90)

Political offices
Preceded by Elbridge G. Spaulding	New York State Treasurer; 1856–1857	Succeeded by Isaac V. Vanderpoel
