= 1862 New York state election =

- November 4, 1862

The 1862 New York state election was held on November 4, 1862, to elect the governor, the lieutenant governor, a Canal Commissioner, an Inspector of State Prisons and the Clerk of the Court of Appeals, as well as all members of the New York State Assembly.

== History ==
The Constitutional Union state convention met on September 9 at Association Hall in Troy, New York. B. Davis Noxon was temporary chairman and made a speech stating that the object of this political body was to stop the American Civil War. Eli P. Morton was chosen president of the convention. Ballots were taken for governor and lieutenant governor. The vote stood as follows. For governor: Horatio Seymour 32, John Adams Dix 20, Millard Fillmore 6, Frederick A. Tallmadge 1, James Brooks 1, Lorenzo Burrows 1. For lieutenant governor: William C. Hasbrouck 29, Burrows 13, Washington Hunt 8, Brooks 3, William Duer 2, Tallmadge 1. No ticket was nominated, the Constitutional Unionists instead joined the Democratic convention on the following day.

The Democratic state convention met on September 10 at Tweddle Hall in Albany, New York. Henry C. Murphy was temporary chairman until the choice of Alonzo C. Paige as chairman. Ex-Governor Horatio Seymour (who was in office 1853–54, and had already twice lost the gubernatorial elections in 1850 and 1854) was nominated for governor by acclamation. Seymour then made a lengthy speech disagreeing with the political course of the Republican federal government.

The Republican Union state convention, a gathering of Republicans and War Democrats, met on September 24 at Wieting Hall in Syracuse, New York. Ex-Chief Judge Alexander S. Johnson (a former Democrat) was temporary chairman until the choice of Henry J. Raymond as president. James S. Wadsworth was nominated for governor on the first ballot. Lyman Tremain (a former Democrat) was nominated for lieutenant governor.

== Result ==
The whole Democratic/Constitutional Union ticket was elected. The total votes cast were more than 70,000 less than in the previous election because the soldiers in the field were not allowed to vote, which is believed to have given a slight majority (about 10,000 votes of a total of more than 600,000) to those opposed to the American Civil War.

The incumbent Skinner was re-elected. The incumbent Hughes was defeated.

64 Republicans and 64 Democrats were elected for the session of 1863 to the New York State Assembly.

1862 state election results
Office	Democratic/Constitutional Union ticket		Republican Union ticket	
Governor	Horatio Seymour	306,649	James S. Wadsworth	295,897
Lieutenant Governor	David R. Floyd-Jones	306,705	Lyman Tremain	296,593
Canal Commissioner	William I. Skinner	307,316	Oliver Ladue	296,101
Inspector of State Prisons	Gaylord J. Clarke	306,422	Andreas Willmann	296,945
Clerk of the Court of Appeals	Frederick A. Tallmadge	305,467	Charles Hughes	296,798

== See also ==
- New York gubernatorial elections

== Sources ==
- Result in The Tribune Almanac for the Years 1838 to 1868 compiled by Horace Greeley
- The tickets: in NYT on November 2, 1862
