= 1862 Connecticut lieutenant gubernatorial election =

- April 7, 1862
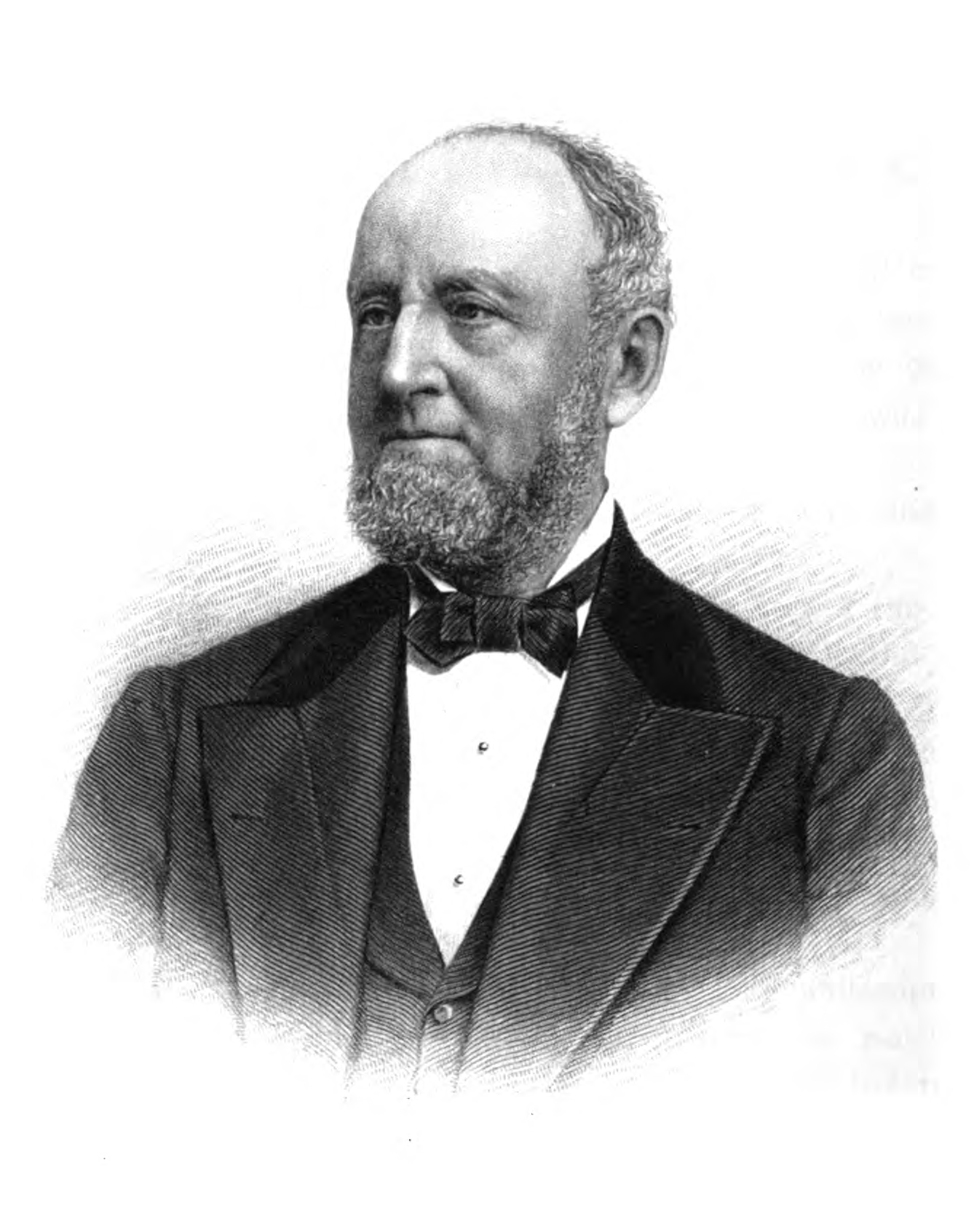

Nominee	Roger Averill	Charles F. Pond
Party	National Union	Democratic
Popular vote	39,480	30,839
Percentage	56.10%	43.80%
Lieutenant Governor before election
Benjamin Douglas
Republican
Elected Lieutenant Governor
Roger Averill
National Union

The 1862 Connecticut lieutenant gubernatorial election was held on April 7, 1862, to elect the lieutenant governor of Connecticut. National Union nominee Roger Averill won the election against Democratic nominee Charles F. Pond.

== General election ==
On election day, April 7, 1862, National Union nominee Roger Averill won the election with 56.10% of the vote, thereby gaining National Union control over the office of lieutenant governor. Averill was sworn in as the 51st lieutenant governor of Connecticut on May 7, 1862.

=== Results ===
Connecticut lieutenant gubernatorial election, 1862
Party	Candidate	Votes	%
National Union	Roger Averill	39,480	56.10
Democratic	Charles F. Pond	30,839	43.80
	Scattering	45	0.10
Total votes		70,364	100.00
National Union gain from Republican			
