= David P. Forrest =

American politician

David P. Forrest was an American politician from New York.

== Life ==
He was Clerk of Schenectady County from 1850 to 1852. He was Mayor of Schenectady in 1859.

He was an Inspector of State Prisons from 1860 to 1862, elected in 1859 on the Republican ticket; and from 1865 to 1867, elected in 1864 on the Union ticket. In 1868, he was Warden of Sing Sing State Prison.

He is associated with the David P. Forrest house at 39 Front Street in Schenectady, New York.

Sources

- The New York Civil List compiled by Franklin Benjamin Hough (pages 46 and 393; Weed, Parsons and Co., 1858)
- The New York Civil List compiled by Franklin Benjamin Hough, Stephen C. Hutchins and Edgar Albert Werner (1867; pages 411 and 536)
- Schenectady history [name given as "David P. Forest" and giving wrong party affiliation]
- THE SING SING PRISON in NYT on December 21, 1868
- THE SING SING MURDER in NYT on December 4, 1868
