= David R. Floyd-Jones =

American politician (1813–1871)

Lieutenant Governor of New York
- In office January 1, 1863 – December 31, 1864
- Governor: Horatio Seymour
- Preceded by: Robert Campbell
- Succeeded by: Thomas G. Alvord

Secretary of State of New York
- In office 1860–1861
- Governor: Edwin D. Morgan
- Preceded by: Gideon J. Tucker
- Succeeded by: Horatio Ballard

Member of the New York State Assembly from the Queens County district
- In office 1857–1857
- Preceded by: Seaman N. Snedeker
- Succeeded by: District divided Edward A. Lawrence (1st D.); John S. Hendrickson (2nd D.)

Member of the New York State Assembly from the New York County district
- In office 1841–1843

Personal details
- Born: David Richard Floyd-Jones; April 6, 1813 South Oyster Bay, New York, U.S.
- Died: January 8, 1871 (aged 57) South Oyster Bay, New York, U.S.
- Resting place: Floyd-Jones Cemetery, South Oyster Bay, New York
- Party: Democratic
- Spouse: Mary Louisa Stanton (m. 1845)
- Relations: Elbert Floyd-Jones (brother); Henry Floyd-Jones (uncle); DeLancey Floyd-Jones (cousin)
- Children: 7
- Education: Union College
- Occupation: Lawyer, politician

David Richard Floyd-Jones (April 6, 1813 – January 8, 1871) was an American lawyer and politician. He served as Secretary of State of New York from 1860 to 1861 and as Lieutenant Governor of New York from 1863 to 1864.

== Early life ==
A descendant of an old Long Island family, he was born at the family mansion on the Fort Neck estate in South Oyster Bay, New York (then Queens, now Nassau County). He was the eldest son of Brig.-Gen. Thomas Floyd-Jones (1788–1851) and Cornelia Haring (née Jones) Floyd-Jones (1796–1839). Among his siblings were merchant William Floyd-Jones, Assemblyman Elbert Floyd-Jones, and Sarah Maria Floyd-Jones (wife of Coleman Williams).

His paternal grandparents were David Richard Floyd-Jones and Sarah (née Onderdonk) Floyd-Jones and his maternal grandfather was Maj. William Jones. Among his extended family was his uncle, New York State Senator Henry Floyd-Jones, and first cousin, Col. DeLancey Floyd-Jones. He was a descendant of William Floyd, signer of the Declaration of Independence, and Maj. Thomas Jones who owned what is known today as Jones Beach.

He was educated at Christ Church Academy in Manhasset, and graduated from Union College in 1832.

== Career ==
After studying law in Schenectady with Judge Samuel W. Jones, he was admitted to the bar and began practicing law in New York City in 1835 in partnership with James P. Howard. He was a Democratic member of the New York State Assembly (New York County) in 1841, 1842, and 1843.

He was a member of the New York State Senate (1st District) from 1844 to 1847, sitting in the 67th, 68th, 69th, and 70th legislatures. He was a delegate to the New York State Constitutional Convention of 1846. He was again a member of the State Assembly (Queens County) in 1857.

He was Secretary of State of New York from 1860 to 1861, elected in November 1859; and Lieutenant Governor of New York from 1863 to 1864, elected in November 1862.

== Personal life ==
On June 24, 1845, Floyd-Jones married Mary Louisa Stanton (1818–1906), a daughter of George Washington Stanton and Sally (née Morgan) Stanton. Together, they had seven children, including:

- Stanton Floyd-Jones (1846–1848), who died young.
- George Stanton Floyd-Jones (1848–1941), president of Atlantic Mutual Insurance Company; he married Anita Owen.
- Thomas Richard Floyd-Jones (1851–1857), who died young.
- Mary Louisa Floyd-Jones (1853–1939), who died unmarried.
- Henrietta Floyd-Jones (1855–1897), a graduate of St. Mary's Hall who joined the Sisterhood of St. John the Baptist.
- Sarah Hall Floyd-Jones (b. 1857), who married Capt. Nathaniel W. Barnardiston, an officer in the Duke of Cambridge's Own (Middlesex Regiment) in 1892.
- Thomas Langley Floyd-Jones (1859–1861), who died young.

He died at the family mansion in 1871, and was buried at the Floyd-Jones Cemetery, on his Fort Neck estate. His widow died on July 22, 1906.

New York State Senate
| Preceded by Morris Franklin | New York State Senate; 1st District (Class 1); 1844–1847 | Succeeded by District abolished |
New York State Assembly
| Preceded by Seaman N. Snedeker | New York State Assembly; Queens County; 1857 | Succeeded by Edward A. Lawrence (1st D.); John S. Hendrickson (2nd D.) |
Political offices
| Preceded by Gideon J. Tucker | Secretary of State of New York; 1860–1861 | Succeeded by Horatio Ballard |
| Preceded by Robert Campbell | Lieutenant Governor of New York; 1863–1864 | Succeeded by Thomas G. Alvord |
