= Philip Dorsheimer =

American politician (1797-1868)

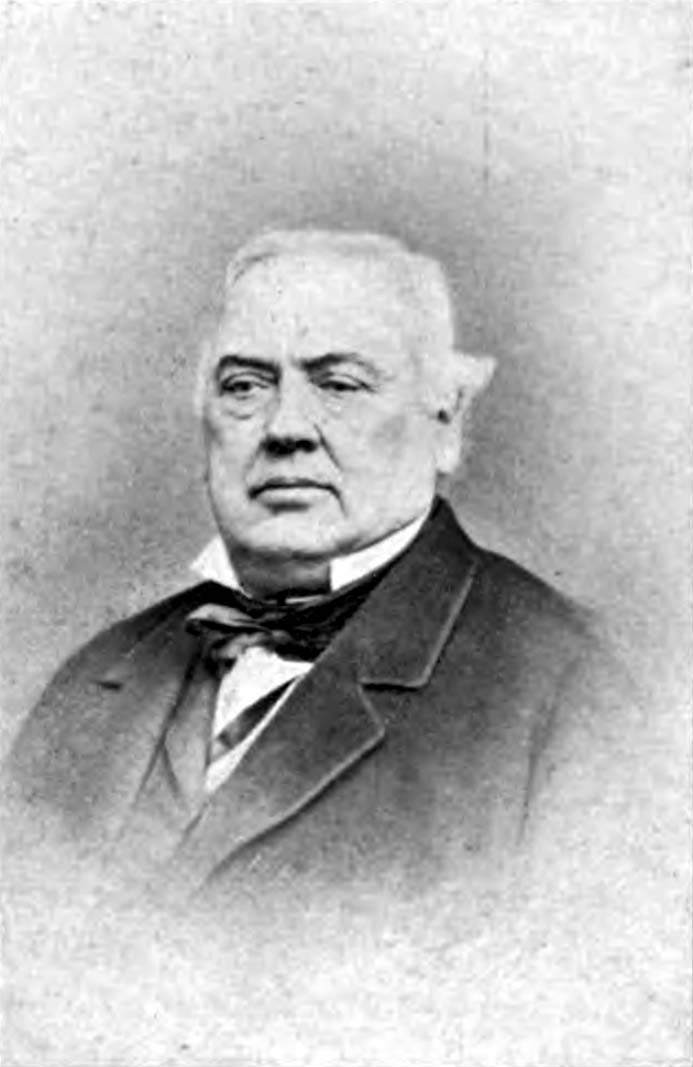

New York State Treasurer
- In office 1860–1861
- Governor: Edwin D. Morgan
- Preceded by: Isaac V. Vanderpoel
- Succeeded by: William B. Lewis

Personal details
- Born: April 15, 1797 Wöllstein, Germany
- Died: April 11, 1868 (aged 70) Buffalo, New York
- Political party: Democratic Party; Republican Party (upon its formation in 1854)
- Spouse: Sarah Gorgas (m. 1821; died 1867)
- Children: William Dorsheimer

Philip Dorsheimer (April 15, 1797 – April 11, 1868) was a German born American politician.

== Early life ==
Dorsheimer was born on April 15, 1797, in Wöllstein, then in the Mont-Tonnerre Department, which is now in Rhineland-Palatinate, Germany.

== Career ==
He came to the United States in 1815, and settled in Harrisburg, Pennsylvania. In 1826, he moved to Lyons, N.Y., and in April 1836 to Buffalo, New York. He owned a hotel in Buffalo and became very wealthy.

In 1838, he was appointed Postmaster of Buffalo by President Martin Van Buren. On April 1, 1845, he was appointed again Postmaster of Buffalo by President James K. Polk. Following his appointment, George W. Clinton wrote to President Polk on April 9, 1845, indicating that there were reports that the people of Buffalo reacted unfavorably to Dorsheimer's appointment as postmaster.

He had been always a Democrat, but joined the Republican Party upon its foundation. He was a delegate to the 1856 Republican National Convention. He was New York State Treasurer from 1860 to 1861. While treasurer, he hosted first lady-elect, Mary Todd Lincoln, in a suite at the Astor House while she was visiting New York. During the U.S. Civil War, as Treasurer, Dorsheimer, along with Governor Edwin D. Morgan, awarded the clothing firm of Brooks Brothers the contract for the manufacture of 12,000 Union army uniforms. From 1862 to 1864, he was Inland Tax Collector at Buffalo.

== Personal life ==
On August 23, 1821, he was married Sarah Gorgas (1802–1867). She was the daughter of Jacob Gorgas and Christina Maria (née Mack) Gorgas. Together, they were the parents of:

- Elizabeth Dorsheimer (1828–1915), who married Henry Clifton (1820-1877).
- William Dorsheimer (1832–1888), who served as Lieutenant Governor of New York.
- Charles Dorsheimer (b. 1834)

Dorsheimer died on April 11, 1868. He was buried at Forest Lawn Cemetery in Buffalo.

Political offices
Preceded by Isaac V. Vanderpoel	New York State Treasurer; 1860–1861	Succeeded by William B. Lewis
