= Charles G. Myers =

New York politician and attorney general

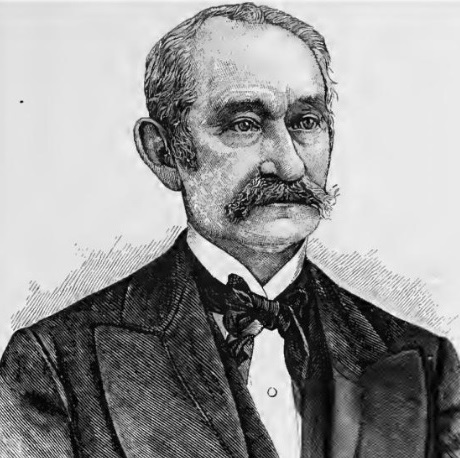
From 1878's History of St. Lawrence Co., New York

Charles G. Myers (February 17, 1810 – December 27, 1881) was an American lawyer and politician.

== Life ==
Myers was born on February 17, 1810 in Madrid, St. Lawrence County, New York. He attended St. Lawrence Academy in Potsdam. In 1825, he began to study law in the office of Gouverneur Ogden in Waddington, was admitted to the bar in 1832, and practiced law in Ogdensburg. He was Surrogate of St. Lawrence County from 1844 to 1847. In 1847 he was living at Oswegatchie. He was a member from St. Lawrence County of the New York State Assembly in 1848. He was a member of the Democratic Party until 1848, when he abandoned this affiliation over the issue of slavery, becoming a Republican. He was District Attorney of St. Lawrence County from 1848 to 1853.

Aside from his legal career, Myers was also a businessman, and a director of the Great Northern Lead Company, which was incorporated on September 8, 1852 at Rossie, New York and operated a lead mine for a few years.

He was New York Attorney General from 1860 to 1861, elected on the Republican and American tickets. He was a canal appraiser from 1873 to 1879. Myers died in Ogdensburg at the age of 71.

== Sources ==
- The New York Civil List compiled by Franklin Benjamin Hough (Weed, Parsons and Co., 1858)
- A History of St. Lawrence and Franklin Counties, New York: From the Earliest Period to the Present Time by Franklin Benjamin Hough (Little & Co., 1853)
- Biographical Sketches of the State Officers and Members of the Legislature of the State of New York in 1861 by William D. Murphy (1861; pages 27ff)

Legal offices
Preceded by Lyman Tremain	New York State Attorney General; 1860–1861	Succeeded by Daniel S. Dickinson
