= DeLancey Floyd-Jones =

United States Army officer

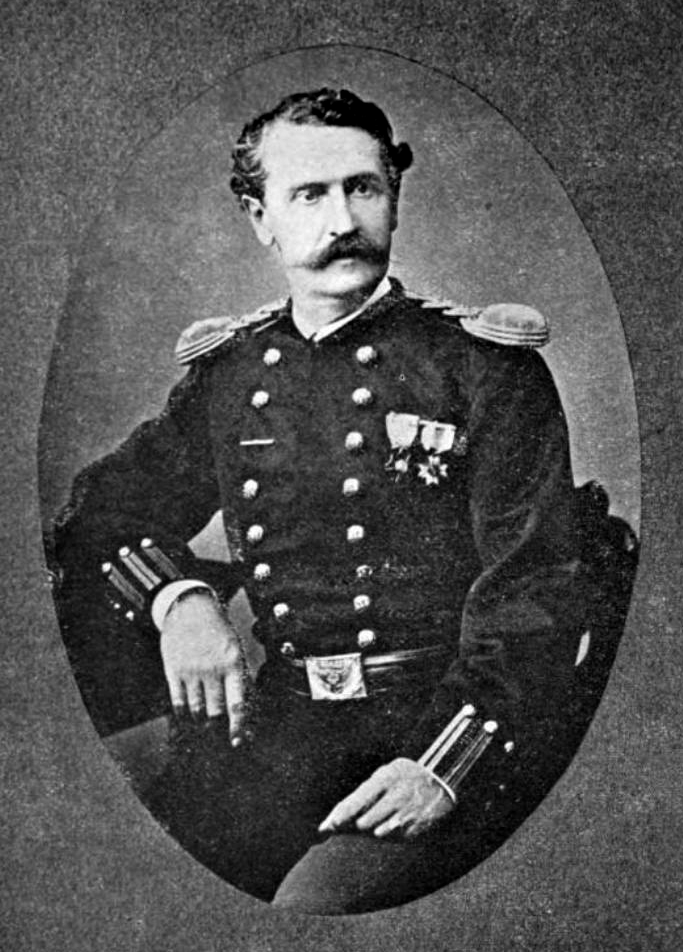
- Born: January 20, 1826; South Oyster Bay, New York, U.S.
- Died: January 19, 1902 (aged 75); New York City, U.S.
- Spouse(s): Laura Jane Whitney (1852), Minnie Oglesby (1858-his death)
- Military career
- Allegiance: United States
- Branch: United States Army
- Service years: 1846-1879
- Rank: Brigadier General
- Wars: Mexican–American War; Siege of Veracruz; Battle of Molino del Rey; Battle for Mexico City; Yakima War; American Civil War; Peninsula campaign; Siege of Yorktown; Battle of Gaines' Mill; Battle of Malvern Hill; Northern Virginia campaign; Second Battle of Bull Run; Maryland campaign; Battle of Antietam; Battle of Fredericksburg; Battle of Chancellorsville; Gettysburg campaign; Battle of Gettysburg
- Other work: travel-writer

DeLancey Floyd-Jones (January 20, 1826 – January 19, 1902) was a career officer in the United States Army, serving in the Mexican–American War and the American Civil War, as well as on frontier duty in the Old West.

== Early career ==
DeLancey Floyd-Jones was born in South Oyster Bay, New York. He graduated from the United States Military Academy at West Point, 45th in the Class of 1846. With the outbreak of the Mexican–American War, he was assigned to Company D, 7th U.S. Infantry as second lieutenant. In November 1846, he was transferred to Company E, 4th U.S. Infantry. He participated in several major battles, including the Siege of Veracruz, the Battle of Molino del Rey, and the Battle for Mexico City. For gallant and meritorious conduct at Molino del Rey, he was brevetted to first lieutenant on September 8, 1847, receiving a promotion to the full rank in January 1848, when he was briefly assigned to duty in Pascagoula, Mississippi.

Floyd-Jones was reassigned to a garrison in Detroit, Michigan, from 1848–50. He then performed recruiting duty for two more years before being assigned to Benicia, California. During the Yakima War, he served at Fort Vancouver and at Fort Steilacoom in the Washington Territory until 1855. Floyd-Jones was promoted to captain on July 31, 1854, while in Washington. He returned to California for a year before being assigned to duty in Oregon.

== American Civil War ==
With the outbreak of the Civil War, Floyd-Jones was promoted to major of the 11th U.S. Infantry on May 14, 1861, and sent to the Eastern Theater. During the 1862 Peninsula Campaign in Virginia, Floyd-Jones commanded the 11th Infantry at the battles of Yorktown, Gaines Mill and Malvern Hill. He was appointed a brevet lieutenant colonel on July 4, 1862, for "gallant and meritorious service during the Peninsular Campaign." He served in the Northern Virginia Campaign, August to September 1862, including the Second Battle of Bull Run. During the Maryland Campaign, his regiment was lightly engaged at the Battle of Antietam, where they took a position immediately east of Sharpsburg.

Floyd-Jones was active in the Rappahannock Campaign and the Mud March, then went into winter camp prior to seeing action again at the Battle of Chancellorsville. At the Battle of Gettysburg, Floyd-Jones led his men into action near the Wheatfield, suffering substantial casualties. He was appointed a brevet colonel, July 2, 1863, for "gallant and meritorious service at Gettysburg."

On August 1, 1863, he was promoted to lieutenant colonel of the 19th U.S. Infantry and was assigned to supervise recruitment at Fort Independence in Massachusetts. In October of that year, he assumed command of the defenses and fortifications of Boston Harbor, a post he held until March 1865. He was brevetted brigadier general on March 13, 1865, and became commander of the 19th Infantry in April 1865.

== Post-war career ==
After the war, Floyd-Jones served in a variety of administrative posts, commanding Newport Barracks in Kentucky from October 1865 to March 1866, and the occupation garrison of Little Rock, Arkansas, from March to August 1866. Following sick leave, he was assigned as Acting Assistant Inspector General and Judge Advocate of the Department of Arkansas from December 1866 to February 1867. He was then in command of Fort Smith, Arkansas until October 1867, and then of Fort Gibson and the District of Indian Territory until January 1868. On June 25, 1867, he was promoted to colonel and assigned to the 6th U.S. Infantry. He served as Superintendent of Indian Affairs in Idaho Territory from June 1869 to November 1870, then at various times commanded Fort Dodge, Fort Hays, the post at Holly Springs, Mississippi, Jackson Barracks in New Orleans, Louisiana, and the garrison in Helena, Montana. In 1871, he was assigned to the 3rd U.S. Infantry. He retired March 20, 1879.

== Personal life ==
DeLancey Floyd-Jones was the fifth child of State Senator Henry Floyd-Jones (1792–1862) and Helen M. (Watts) Floyd-Jones. He was married twice: First, on June 24, 1852, to Laura Jane "Jennie" Whitney (1827–1852), of Rochester, New York, who died only three months after their wedding while Floyd-Jones was stationed in Washington Territory; Second, on April 29, 1878, to Minnie Oglesby (1858–1929), of New Orleans. They separated a few years after their wedding but never divorced.

Floyd-Jones traveled around the world many times, during leaves from the army and after his retirement in 1879. He documented these journeys in letters home, and frequently had his observations and descriptions of these faraway places published in local Long Island, New York newspapers such as The South Side Signal and The Hempstead Inquirer. He also published a well-reviewed book about his travels to India, China, and Japan in the late 1880s, entitled Letters From The Far East.

He was also the founder and builder, in 1896, of the first free library on the south shore of Long Island, the Delancey Floyd-Jones Free Library, contributing his personal books.

After retirement, he became more involved in the many social and military organizations he had joined over the years. In 1847, he was among the establishers of The Aztec Club of 1847. In 1885, he was elected treasurer of the club; in 1892 he presented the club with a silver centerpiece manufactured by Tiffany's representing an ancient Aztec Teocali. The centerpiece is still used at their annual meetings to this day. In 1894 he was elected vice president of the club, and succeeded to the presidency the following year, while also remaining treasurer. He was also an active member of the South Side Sportsman's Club, The St. Nicholas Society, the Loyal Legion of the United States, and was a lifetime member of the Sons of the Revolution.

A note on the hyphenation of his last name: DeLancey Floyd-Jones is descended from Major Thomas Jones (1665–1713) privateer and soldier, for whom Jones Beach, Long Island, is named; and Col. Richard Floyd (1620-c. 1690). In 1757, Thomas Jones's granddaughter, Arabella Jones, married Col. Richard Floyd IV, son of Richard Floyd III, whose will stated that his (sizeable) estate would be handed down to the first male issue of any issue with provision that the name be hyphenated to contain "Floyd." Arabella fulfilled that provision, and thus, the name was hyphenated Floyd-Jones.

DeLancey Floyd-Jones was also related (through direct line or marriage) to William Floyd and Philip Livingston, both signers of the Declaration of Independence; writer James Fenimore Cooper; John Loudon McAdam (creator of the road construction style named after him); Daniel Webster, Governor DeWitt Clinton of New York, Edith Wharton, and Alexander Hamilton.
