= Lyman Tremain =

American politician

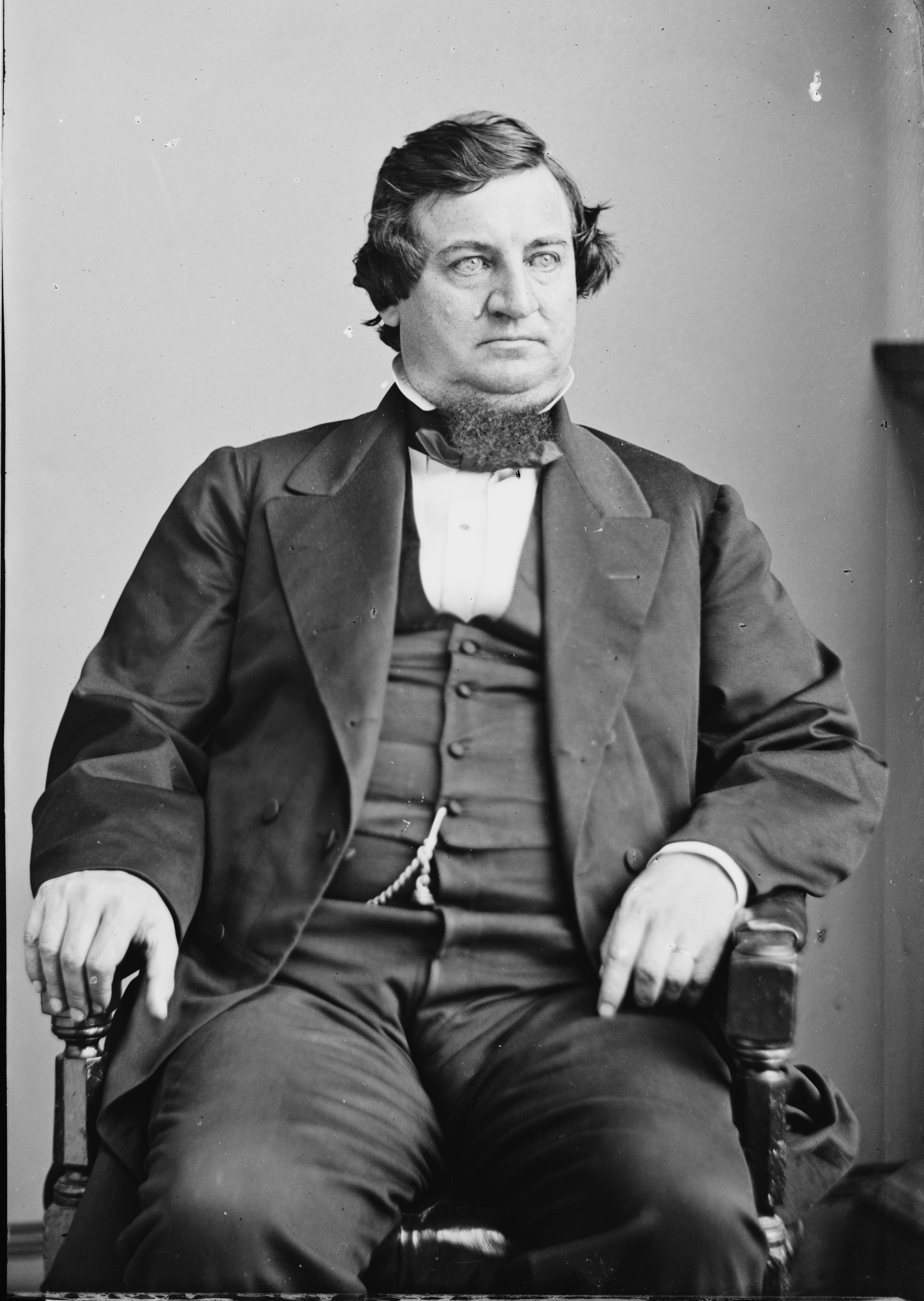

Member of the U.S. House of Representatives from New York's at-large district
- In office March 4, 1873 – March 3, 1875
- Succeeded by: Henry W. Slocum

New York Attorney General
- In office January 1, 1858 – December 31, 1859
- Governor: John A. King; Edwin D. Morgan
- Preceded by: Stephen B. Cushing
- Succeeded by: Charles G. Myers

Personal details
- Born: June 14, 1819 Durham, New York, U.S.
- Died: November 30, 1878 (aged 59) New York City, U.S.

Lyman Tremain (June 14, 1819, in Durham, Greene County, New York – November 30, 1878, in New York City) was a jurist and politician from New York.

== Biography ==
He was admitted to the bar in 1840 and practiced in Durham, where he was elected to his first political office as town supervisor in 1842. He was appointed District Attorney of Greene County in 1844. He was elected Surrogate in 1846, but lost reelection in 1851.

He moved to Albany, New York in 1853 and entered into partnership with former Congressman Rufus Wheeler Peckham in 1855. Elected as a Democrat, he was New York State Attorney General from January 1, 1858, to December 31, 1859.

He ran unsuccessfully as the Republican candidate for Lieutenant Governor of New York in 1862. In June 1864 he was a delegate to the Baltimore Convention of the National Union Party where he placed the name of Daniel S. Dickinson in contention for the vice presidential nomination on the ticket with President Lincoln. He served as a member of the New York State Assembly in 1866, and was elected Speaker. He was a delegate to the 1868 Republican National Convention and placed Governor Fenton's name in contention for Vice President on the ticket with General Grant.

In 1872, Tremain was elected as a Republican to the Forty-third United States Congress, defeating the incumbent Samuel Sullivan Cox. He served from March 4, 1873, to March 3, 1875, and then did not seek reelection. In 1873, Tremain also served with his partner's oldest son, Wheeler Hazard Peckham, as special counsel to the State in the prosecution of Boss Tweed. After leaving Congress, Tremain returned to private legal practice in Albany and then died in New York City while visiting. He was buried in Albany Rural Cemetery in Menands, New York.

Tremain's son Frederick Lyman (June 1843 – February 6, 1865) was a lieutenant colonel of the 10th New York Cavalry during the Civil War who was killed at the Battle of Hatcher's Run.

== Notes ==
New York State Assembly
Preceded by Joseph Shook	New York State Assembly; Albany County, 2nd District; 1866	Succeeded by Henry Smith
Legal offices
Preceded by Stephen B. Cushing	New York State Attorney General; 1858–1859	Succeeded by Charles G. Myers
Political offices
Preceded by George Gilbert Hoskins	Speaker of the New York State Assembly; 1866	Succeeded by Edmund L. Pitts
U.S. House of Representatives
New district	Member of the U.S. House of Representatives from New York's at-large congressional seat 1873–1875	Succeeded by Henry W. Slocum
