= Almon M. Clapp =

American printer and politician

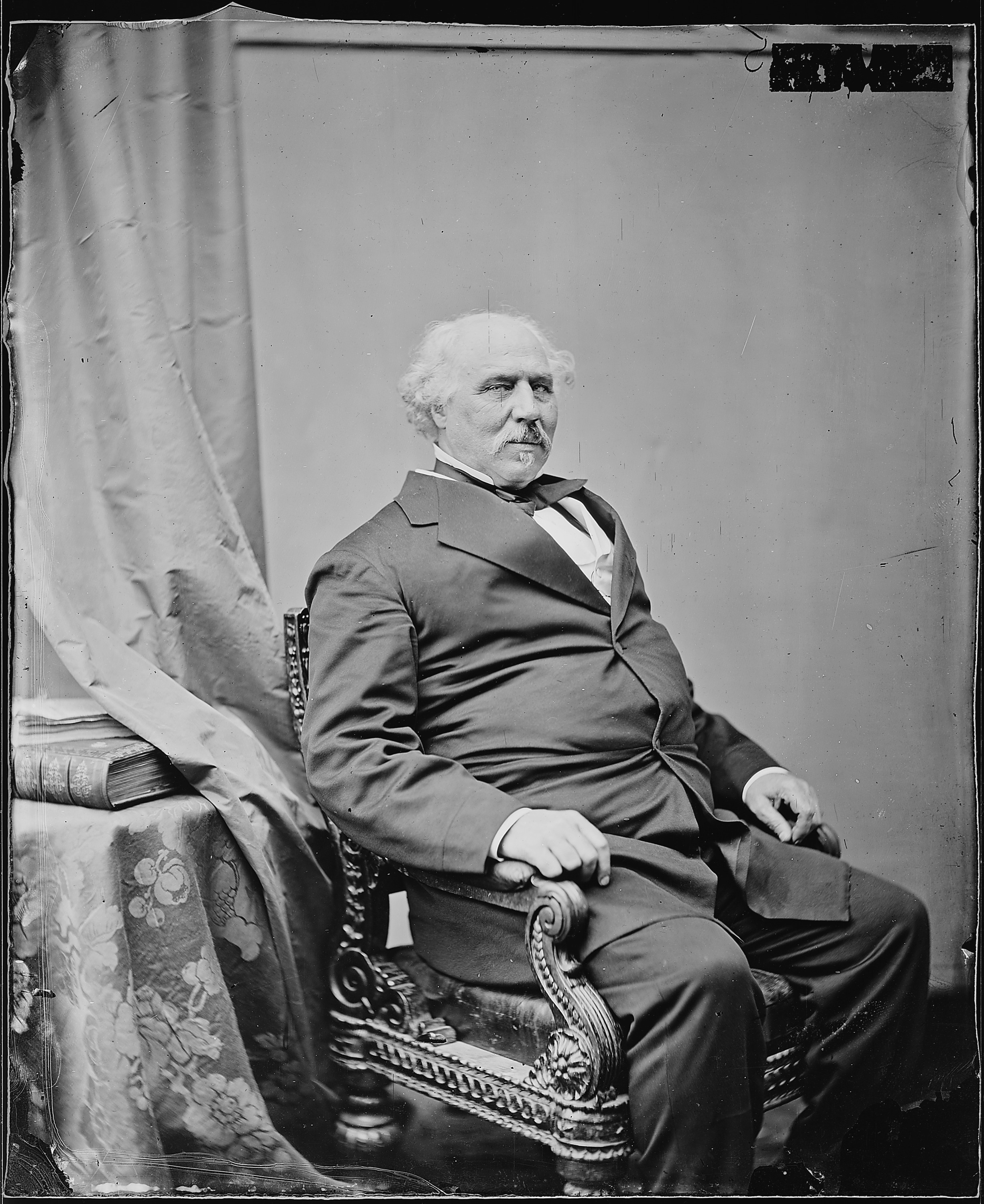
Almon M. Clapp, circa 1860-65

Almon Mason Clapp (September 14, 1811 – April 9, 1899) was an American printer and politician, and the first person to hold the title of Public Printer of the United States, from 1876 to 1877.

== Biography ==
Clapp was born in Killingly, Connecticut in 1811, a descendant of immigrant Thomas Clapp of Dorchester, England and a cousin of Roger Clapp who arrived in America on the 1630 voyage of the Mary and John. His family moved to Livingston County, New York in 1818, and at age 14 he became a printer's apprentice in Genesee, New York. He moved to Buffalo, New York in 1828, and after finishing his education engaging in commerce for a few years, founded the Aurora Standard in 1835. In 1838, he became editor and part owner of the Buffalo Commercial Advertiser, where he remained until he founded the Buffalo Express in 1846. He served in the State Assembly in 1853 as a Whig, but by 1856 he was a leader at the Pittsburgh convention of the new Republican Party. He was the party's nominee for Secretary of State of New York in the 1857 election, losing to Gideon J. Tucker.

In 1861, President Abraham Lincoln appointed Clapp to be postmaster of Buffalo. He was reappointed in 1865 and served until President Andrew Johnson removed him in June 1866. In 1869 the United States Senate elected him to be Congressional Printer, and he sold the Express. When the title Public Printer of the United States was created in 1876, he continued as printer in that title for another year. In 1877, he bought the National Republican newspaper in Washington, D.C., which was a pro-Republican paper, and owned it until 1880.

Clapp died at his home in Washington in April 1899. He is buried at Forest Lawn Cemetery in Buffalo.

New York State Assembly
Preceded by William W. Weed	New York State Assembly; Erie County, 1st District; 1853	Succeeded by William W. Weed
Political offices
Preceded by office established	Public Printer of the United States; 1876–1877	Succeeded by John D. Defrees
