= 1857 New York state election =

- November 3, 1857

The 1857 New York state election was held on November 3, 1857, to elect the Secretary of State, the State Comptroller, the Attorney General, the State Treasurer, the State Engineer, a Judge of the New York Court of Appeals, a Canal Commissioner and an Inspector of State Prisons, as well as all members of the New York State Assembly and the New York State Senate.

== History ==
The Democratic state convention met on September 10 and 11 at Syracuse, New York. Gideon J. Tucker (Tammany) was nominated for Secretary of State "by acclamation" after a first informal ballot showed a large majority for him and the other candidate George B. Wood was withdrawn. Sanford E. Church (Soft) was nominated for Comptroller "unanimously" after a first informal ballot showed a large majority and the other candidates Alfred M. Wood and Thomas B. Mitchell were withdrawn. Lyman Tremain, Benjamin Bailey and Francis Kernan were proposed for Attorney General but Tremain (Hard) was nominated by acclamation. Isaac V. Vanderpoel, Joseph M. Lyon and Thomas Osborne were proposed for Treasurer, but Vanderpoel (Soft) was nominated unanimously. John M. Jaycox (Hard) was nominated for Canal Commissioner. The nomination for State Engineer caused much excitement when Charles R. Graham was proposed and had his party allegiance questioned when it was remembered that he had chaired a Whig convention in New York City four years previously. After much controversy, including speeches by Daniel E. Sickles and Mayor Fernando Wood, Van Rensselaer Richmond (Soft) was nominated on the first ballot. William C. Rhodes (Hard) was nominated unanimously on the first ballot for Prison Inspector. The re-nomination of Hiram Denio caused another even bigger controversy. Ex-Governor Horatio Seymour rose to urge Denio's nomination, Mayor Fernando Wood spoke fiercely against it, because Denio had made decisions against Wood, and was accused of not being a Democrat. Replying to Wood, Sickles defended Denio in a speech and John Cochrane also endorsed Denio who was nominated on the first ballot with 67 out of 117 votes cast.

The American state convention met on September 15 at Syracuse, New York.

The Republican state convention met on September 23 at Wieting Hall in Syracuse, New York. Almon M. Clapp was Temporary Chairman until the choice of Abijah Mann, Jr. as President. Timothy Jenkins was nominated for the Court of Appeals on the second ballot after much debate on the proposal to endorse Democrat Hiram Denio which course was defended by David Dudley Field (first ballot: Jenkins 119, Henry Wells 50, William B. Wright 45, Denio 12, E. G. Chase 4, H. H. Shankland 2, Ward Hunt 1, this was a small majority for Jenkins, but after much debate if the nomination could be made "unanimous", the roll was called again; second ballot: Jenkins 129, Wright 24, Wells 13, Denio 9). William Curtis Noyes was nominated for Attorney General, and Robert Denniston for Comptroller by acclamation. Almon M. Clapp was nominated for Secretary of State on the ballot (informal ballot: William W. Campbell 91, Clapp 85, John T. Hogeboom 49; first ballot: Clapp 121, Campbell 92, Hogeboom 30; second ballot: Clapp 152, Campbell 64). John T. Hogeboom was nominated for Treasurer by acclamation. Ariel S. Thurston was nominated for Canal Commissioner on the third ballot (first ballot: Thurston 74, Alexander B. Williams 64, Samuel H. Barnes 51, Ansell Bascom 16, William Mallory 15, George Geddes 11; second ballot: Thurston 98, Williams 78, Barnes 52, Bascom 3, Mallory 1; third ballot: Thurston 120, Williams 59, Barnes 58). George Geddes was nominated for State Engineer on the first ballot (vote: Geddes 140, Silas Seymour 94, scattering 4). Thomas Kirkpatrick was nominated for Prison Inspector on the second ballot (first ballot: Kirkpatrick 62, Norwood Bowne [incumbent] 39, David P. Forrest 26, Luther Caldwell 25, some more scattering; second ballot: Kirkpatrick 102, Bowne 40, Caldwell 27, Forrest 16).

== Results ==
The whole Democratic state ticket was elected with a plurality of less than 20,000 votes over the Republican ticket while only in New York County, the stronghold of Tammany Hall, the ticket had a plurality of about 24,000 votes.

The incumbent Denio was re-elected.

15 Republicans, 14 Democrats, two Americans and one Independent Republican were elected to a two-year term (1858–59) in the New York State Senate.

61 Republicans, 58 Democrats and 9 Americans were elected for the session of 1858 to the New York State Assembly.

1857 state election results
Office	Democratic ticket		Republican ticket		American ticket		Liberty ticket
Secretary of State	Gideon J. Tucker	195,482	Almon M. Clapp	177,425	James O. Putnam	66,882	James McCune Smith
Comptroller	Sanford E. Church	195,138	Robert Denniston	178,038	Nathaniel S. Benton	67,030	Lewis Tappan
Attorney General	Lyman Tremain	195,186	William Curtis Noyes	178,335	Henry H. Ross	65,519	George Boyer Vashon
Treasurer	Isaac V. Vanderpoel	195,153	John T. Hogeboom	178,194	Lyman Odell	66,737	C. B. D. Mills
State Engineer	Van Rensselaer Richmond	195,284	George Geddes	178,152	Roswell Graves	65,583	E. Porter
Judge of the Court of Appeals	Hiram Denio	196,016	Timothy Jenkins	175,325	Hiram Ketchum	64,299	Beriah Green
Canal Commissioner	John M. Jaycox	194,958	Ariel S. Thurston	177,888	Goldsmith Denniston	66,328	J. C. Harrington
Inspector of State Prisons	William C. Rhodes	195,167	Thomas Kirkpatrick	177,718	John M. Stevens	66,862	J. C. Delong

== See also ==
- New York state elections

== Sources ==
- Result in The Tribune Almanac 1858
