= 1860 New York state election =

- November 6, 1860

The 1860 New York state election was held on November 6, 1860, to elect the governor, the lieutenant governor, a Canal Commissioner, and an Inspector of State Prisons, as well as all members of the New York State Assembly. Besides, the question of Negro suffrage was asked, and was answered in the negative with 197,503 votes for and 337,984 against it.

== History ==
William Kelly was the candidate of the majority faction of the Democratic Party which supported Stephen A. Douglas for president.

The "Breckinridge and Lane Democratic" state convention met on August 8 at Syracuse, New York, Henry S. Randall presided. James T. Brady (a Tammany man from New York City who had run for Attorney General on the Hard ticket in 1853) was nominated for Governor on the first ballot (vote:Brady 99, O'Connor 8, Greene C. Bronson 3, Brown 2, Lawrence 1, Kemble 1, Gideon J. Tucker 1). Henry K. Viele was nominated on the first ballot (vote: Viele 57, Edward Tompkins 56). The incumbent John M. Jaycox was re-nominated for Canal Commissioner by acclamation. Robert W. Allen was nominated for Prison Inspector on the first ballot. After the nominations, Daniel S. Dickinson made a speech. Brady accepted the nomination in a letter dated on August 14.

The Constitution Union state convention met on July 13 at Utica. They resolved that "a State Committee be appointed to consist of four persons from each Judicial District, to be appointed by the delegates thereof, where duty it shall be to form an electoral ticket, and to present the same to the people of this State, at a suitable time, precious to the coming election, and that they be authorized to form said ticket in such manner as they deem best calculated to unite National Union men of every name and designation." The committee ultimately resolved to fuse their ticket with the Democratic Party ticket.

== Result ==
The whole Republican ticket was elected, an average of about 50,000 votes ahead of the combined Democratic vote. The incumbents Morgan and Campbell were re-elected. The incumbents Jaycox and Rhodes were defeated.

93 Republicans and 35 Democrats were elected for the session of 1861 to the New York State Assembly.

New York black suffrage referendum
- Question of Negro Suffrage

Results
| Choice | Votes | % |
|---|---|---|
| Yes | 197,889 | 36.40% |
| No | 345,791 | 63.60% |
| Valid votes | 543,680 | 100.00% |
| Invalid or blank votes | 0 | 0.00% |
| Total votes | 543,680 | 100.00% |
County Results
Yes
50-60%
60-70%
No
50-60%
60-70%
70-80%
80-90%
90-100%
Unknown/No Vote

1860 state election results
| Office | Republican ticket | | Douglas Democratic ticket | | Breckinridge Democratic ticket | | Radical Abolitionist ticket |
|---|---|---|---|---|---|---|---|
| Governor | Edwin D. Morgan | 358,272 | William Kelly | 294,812 | James T. Brady | 19,841 | William Goodell |
| Lieutenant Governor | Robert Campbell | 361,914 | William C. Crain | 293,572 | Henry K. Viele | 18,425 | Sidney A. Beers |
| Canal Commissioner | Samuel H. Barnes | 361,958 | William W. Wright | 293,853 | John M. Jaycox | 18,547 | Zenas Brockett |
| Inspector of State Prisons | James K. Bates | 359,457 | William C. Rhodes | 294,066 | Robert W. Allen | 18,550 | Ellis Clizbe |

== See also ==
- New York gubernatorial elections
- 1860 New York suffrage referendum
- 1860 United States presidential election

== Sources ==
- Result in The Tribune Almanac 1861
- Result in The Official State Canvass in NYT on December 10, 1860 (gives 367,958 for Barnes, which seems to be a typo)
- The tickets: THE ELECTION TO-MORROW in NYT on November 5, 1860
