= John M. Jaycox =

American journalist

John M. Jaycox was an American businessman and politician from New York.

== Life ==
He lived in Syracuse, New York. He was a wholesale grocer and co-owner, with John A. Green, of the Syracuse Courier.

He was a Canal Commissioner from 1858 to 1860, elected as a Hard on the Democratic ticket in 1857. In 1860, he ran for re-election on the National Democratic ticket but was defeated by Republican Samuel H. Barnes.

In 1861, Jaycox, Thomas G. Alvord and others were authorized by the New York State Legislature to build a railroad from Syracuse to Geddes, New York.

In 1867, he was President of the Syracuse, Fayetteville and Manlius Railroad which then had a length of 10 miles.

== Sources ==
- The Breckinridge and Lane Democratic State Convention in NYT on August 9, 1860
- The New York Civil List compiled by Franklin Benjamin Hough, Stephen C. Hutchins and Edgar Albert Werner (1867; page 406)
- Annual Report of the Railroad Commission (1868; pages 671f)
- Laws of the State of New York (1861; page 486)
