= William C. Rhodes (New York politician) =

American journalist and politician

William C. Rhodes was an American newspaper editor and politician from New York.

== Life ==
In January 1845, he married Fanny P. Maxwell (ca. 1824-1893) at Elmira, New York.

He published with George W. Mason the Elmira Gazette from 1841 to 1848. He published and edited the Elmira Daily Gazette from 1856 to 1857.

He was an Inspector of State Prisons from 1858 to 1860, elected on the Democratic ticket in 1857 but defeated for re-election in 1860 by Republican James K. Bates. In 1861, he ran again but was again defeated, this time by the Union candidate Abraham B. Tappen.

He was Warden of Clinton State Prison from 1870 to 1872.

== Sources ==
- The New York Civil List compiled by Franklin Benjamin Hough (page 46; Weed, Parsons and Co., 1858)
- Newspaper history - "Elmira Daily Gazette"
- Newspaper history - "Elmira Gazette"
