= Edwin Croswell =

American journalist (1797–1871)

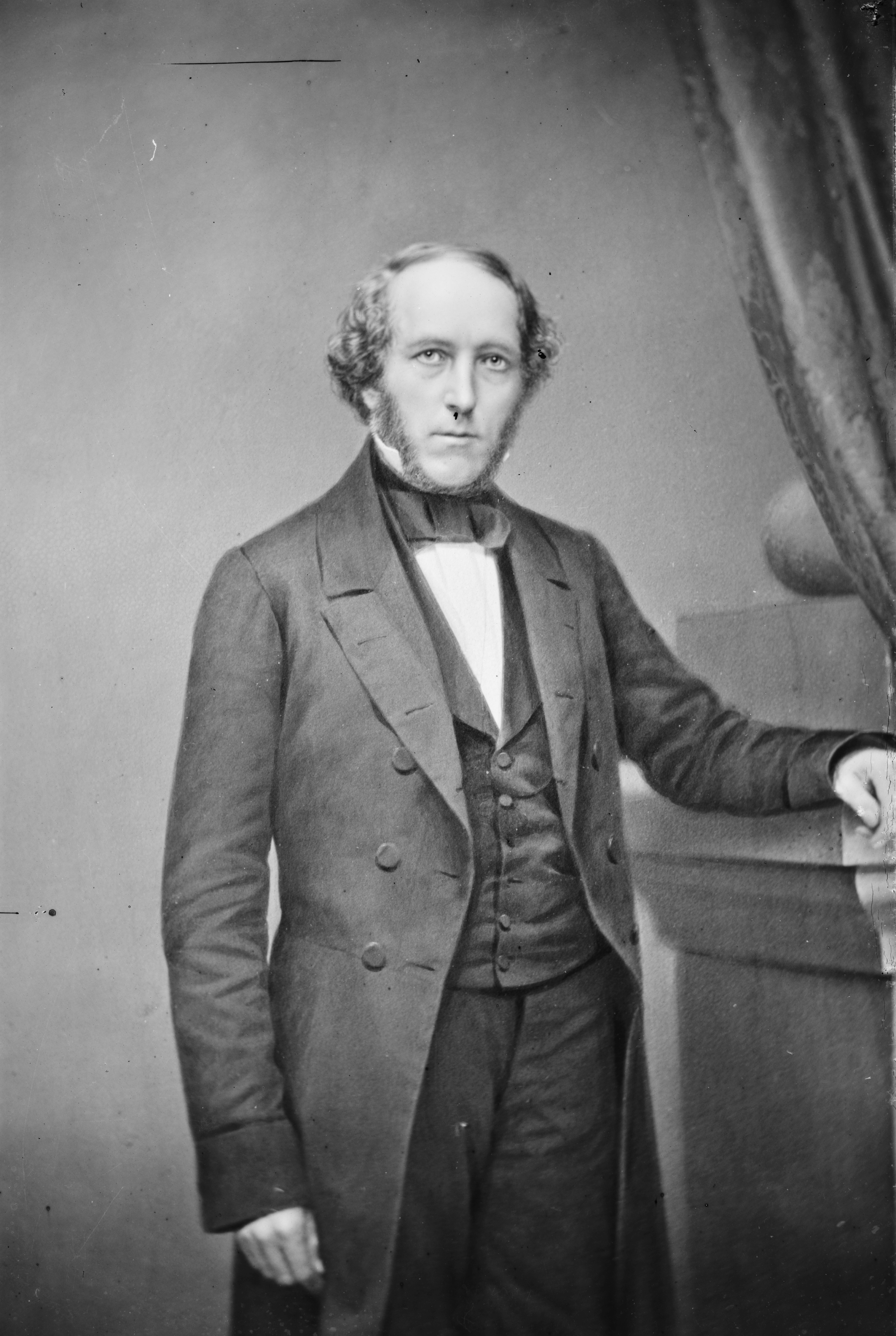
- Born: May 29, 1797; Catskill, Greene, New York
- Died: June 13, 1871 (aged 74); Princeton, New Jersey
- Citizenship: United States
- Occupation: Journalist
- Relatives: Mackay Croswell, father Betsey Shethar, mother
- Writing career
- Years active: 1823-1854
- Notable work: Albany Argus

Edwin Croswell (May 29, 1797 in Catskill, New York – June 13, 1871 in Princeton, New Jersey), was an American journalist and politician. Croswell's father and uncle were both influential editors and journalists in the early 19th century. Edwin expanded the family's influence on American journalism.

== Early life ==
In 1800, while he lived in the Hudson River town of Catskill, Croswell's father, Mackay Croswell, started a newspaper called the Western Constellation. When it closed in 1804, Mackay Croswell started the Catskill Recorder, in which he was later joined by his brother Harry Croswell. Harry had been named in a libel lawsuit, People vs Croswell, over an article about President Thomas Jefferson that had appeared in The Wasp, a satiric newspaper that had been published for a few years in Hudson, New York.

A contemporary of Edwin's, Thurlow Weed, said "Mr. Croswell, as a boy, was noticeable for the same quiet, studious, refined habits and associations which have characterized his whole life." When Croswell was seven, he had "the advantage of the best tutors in the locality to instruct his youthful mind." He later attended college, where he studied English. When he was fourteen he began his apprenticeship at the family paper. By his mid-twenties, he had assumed more responsibility for writing, editing, and publishing the paper.

== Albany years ==
In January, 1823, Croswell went to Albany, New York for the funeral of Judge Moses I. Cantine, the editor and one of the publishers of the Albany Argus. Cantine was a Catskill native, and had written articles for the Recorder. Martin Van Buren and other members of the Albany Regency, an influential Democratic party machine, urged Croswell to take the position of assistant editor of the Argus. Accepting the position, he worked for Issac Q. Leake, who continued as publisher until the latter part of 1823, when he became too ill to continue. The Argus voiced Van Buren's positions on questions of the day, including the construction of the Erie Canal, establishment of the national bank, and the states' rights issue of 'nullification'; the Argus also disparaged Tammany Hall. On October 8, 1824, Croswell changed the paper from semi-weekly to daily publication. Articles in the Argus were reprinted in other papers throughout the state as embodiments of Democratic party principles. In 1840, Croswell was elected to the first of his two terms as 'state printer', which solidified his position in Albany. He retired from the Argus in 1854, succeeded by Gideon J. Tucker; Croswell sold his interest in the Argus, and engaged in business in New York City.

== Late life ==
Croswell became involved with the U.S. Mail Steamship Company in the 1840s. In May 1855 Croswell, as director of the company, was charged with fraud and dishonest acts (People v Croswell). Croswell was then removed as a director and had to replace the stolen money. His childhood friend, Thurlow Weed, continued to visit Croswell. Edwin Croswell died in Princeton, New Jersey at the age of 74.
