= Director of the U.S. Government Publishing Office =

Head of the US Government Printing Office

The director of the U.S. Government Publishing Office, formerly the public printer of the United States, is the head of the United States Government Publishing Office (GPO). Pursuant to 44 U.S.C. § 301, this officer is nominated by the president of the United States and approved by the United States Senate. The title was changed to "Director" when in December 2014, Congress passed and President Barack Obama signed into law H.R. 83, which consolidated and continued appropriations for FY 2015. Section 1301 of that act changed the name of the Government Printing Office to the Government Publishing Office and the title of public printer to director. Thus, Davita Vance-Cooks was the last public printer of the United States and the first director of the U.S. Government Publishing Office.

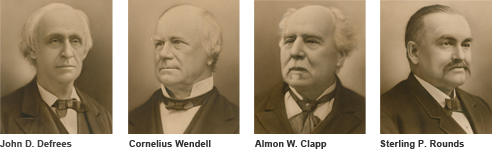
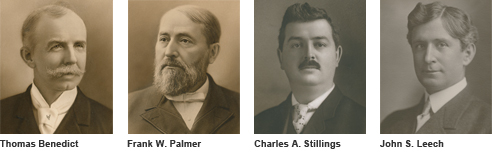
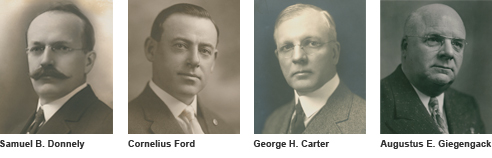
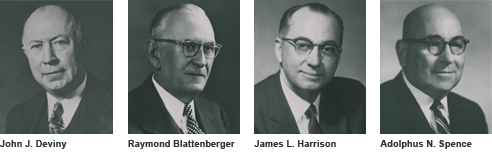
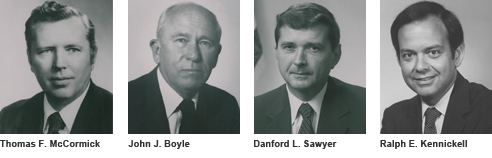
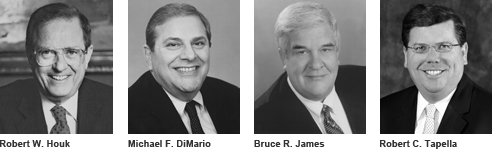

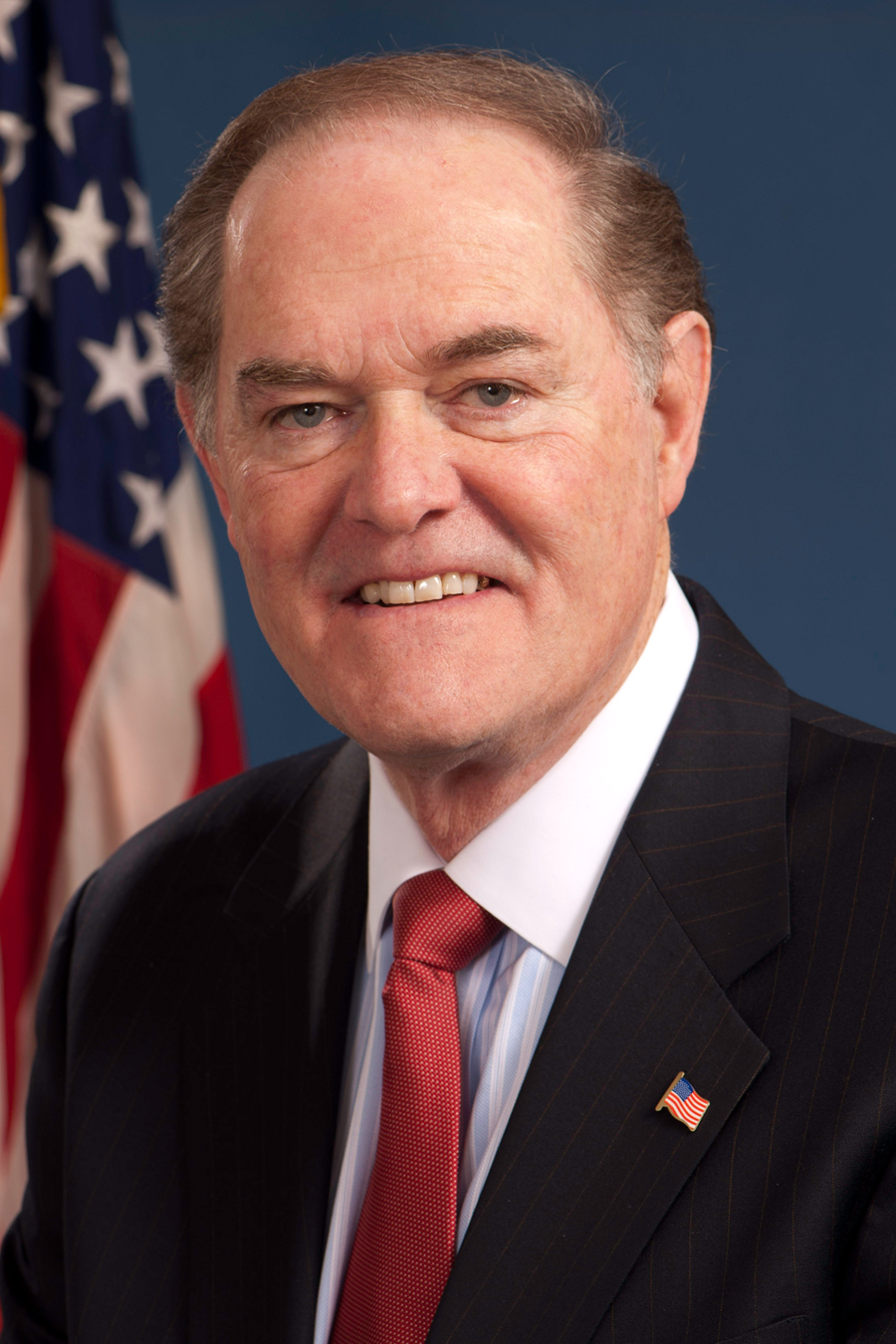
William J. Boarman

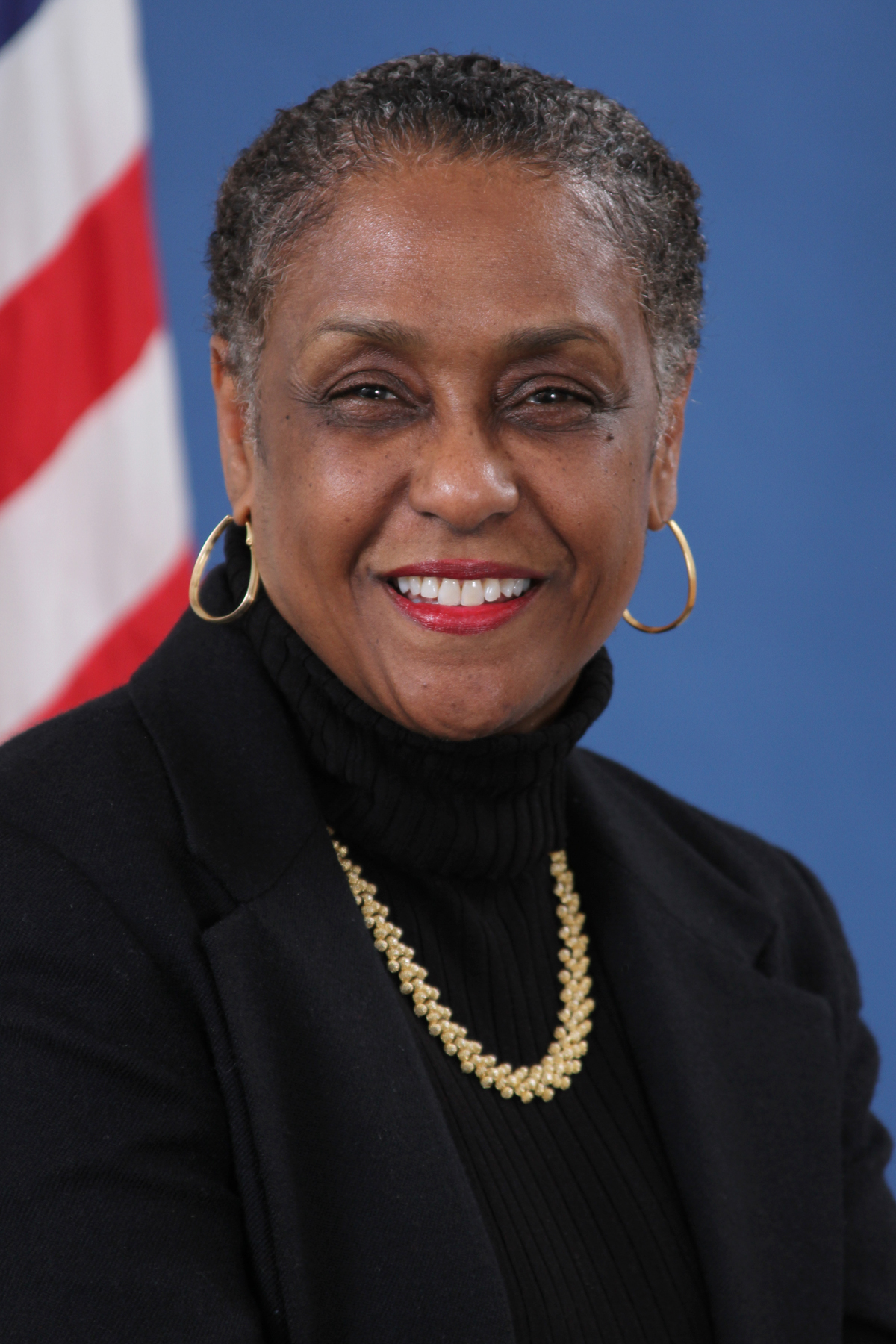
Davita E. Vance-Cooks

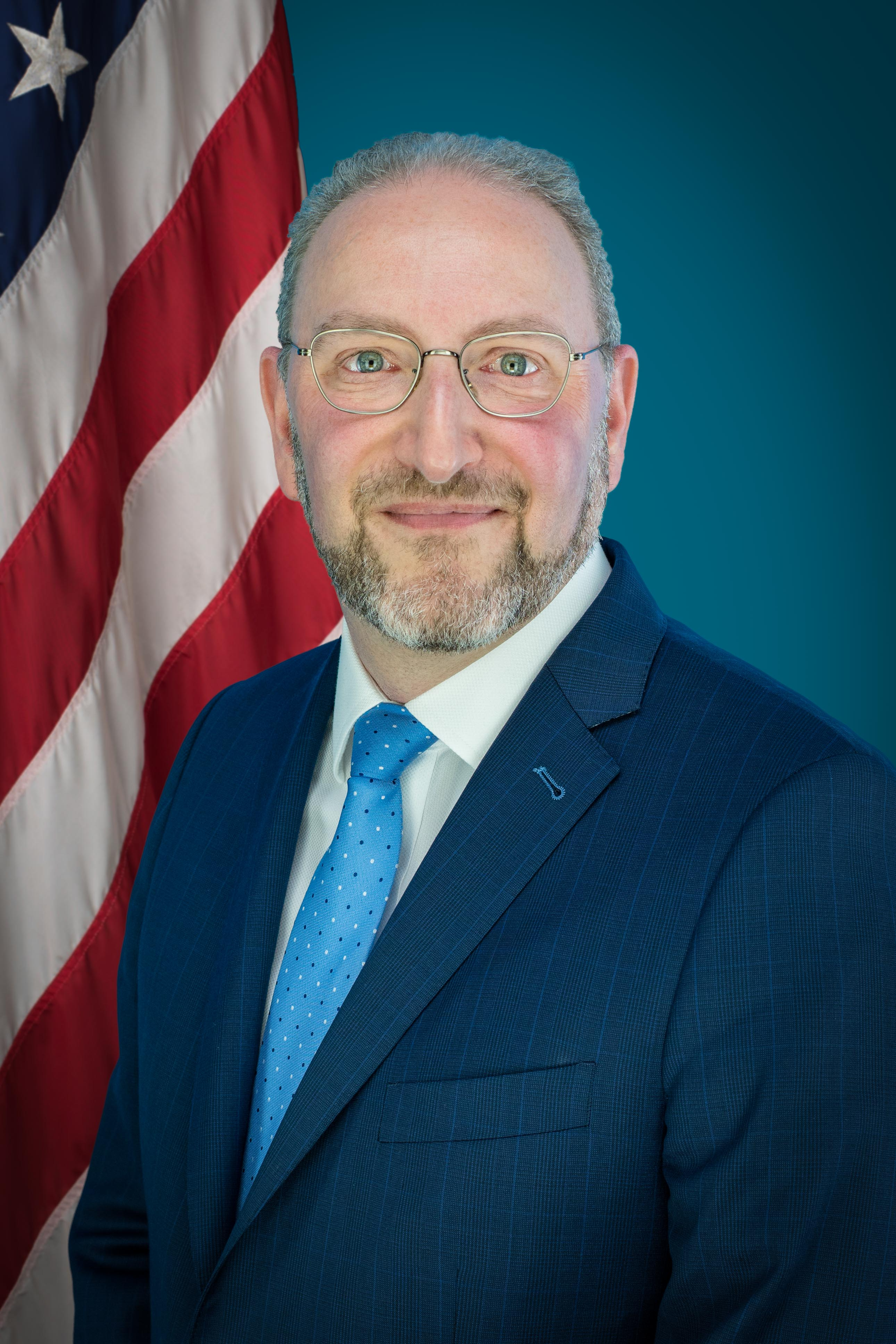
Hugh N. Halpern

The director is responsible for the administration of the GPO. The GPO, a legislative agency of the government, provides electronic access to and produced most printed matter for government, including the Congressional Record, Supreme Court decisions, passports, tax forms, internal government documents, and agency publications. The GPO did not print money, as that is a duty of the Bureau of Engraving and Printing.

== History ==
Benjamin Franklin served as Public Printer for several of the American colonies prior to the establishment of the United States. The House and Senate had separate printers until 1861, when the GPO was established; its first superintendent was John D. Defrees. The first man with the title Public Printer of the United States was Almon M. Clapp.

== List of leaders ==
=== Superintendents (1861–1876) ===
The follow persons served as superintendent of the General Printing Office:

No.	Image	Superintendent	Term start	Term end	Refs.
1		John D. Defrees	March 4, 1861	1866	
2		Cornelius Wendell	September 1, 1866	February 28, 1867	
3		John D. Defrees	March 1, 1867	April 14, 1869	
4		Almon M. Clapp	April 15, 1869	July 31, 1876	

=== Public printers (1876-2014) ===
The follow persons served as public printer of the General Printing Office:

No.	Image	Public printer	Term start	Term end	Refs.
1		Almon M. Clapp	August 1, 1876	May 30, 1877	
2		John D. Defrees	June 1, 1877	1882	
3		Sterling P. Rounds	April 15, 1882	September 12, 1886	
4		Thomas E. Benedict	September 13, 1886	May 6, 1889	
5		Francis W. Palmer	May 7, 1889	May 2, 1894	
6		Thomas E. Benedict	May 3, 1894	March 30, 1897	
7		Francis W. Palmer	March 31, 1897	September 8, 1905	
8		Charles A. Stillings	November 1, 1905 February 5, 1908		
9		John S. Leech	June 9, 1908	November 30, 1908	
10		Samuel B. Donnelly	December 1, 1908	June 25, 1913	
11		Cornelius Ford	June 26, 1913	1921	
12		George H. Carter	April 5, 1921	1934	
13		Augustus E. Giegengack	July 2, 1934	March 9, 1948	
14		John J. Deviny	May 6, 1948	February 28, 1953	
15		Raymond Blattenberger	April 28, 1953	January 20, 1961	
16		James L. Harrison	March 17, 1961	March 31, 1970	
17		Adolphus N. Spence	April 1, 1970	January 11, 1972 (Note: Died in office)	
18		Thomas F. McCormick	March 1, 1973	October 31, 1977	
19		John J. Boyle	November 1, 1977	February 29, 1980	
20		Danford L. Sawyer, Jr.	1981	1984	
21		Ralph E. Kennickell, Jr.	1984	1988	
22		Robert Houk	1990	1993	
23		Michael F. DiMario	1993	2002	
24		Bruce James	2002	2006	
Acting		William H. Turri	January 2007	November 5, 2007	
25		Robert Tapella	November 6, 2007	December 29, 2010	
Acting		Paul Erickson	December 30, 2010	January 4, 2011	
26		William J. Boarman (Note: Unconfirmed recess appointment)	January 5, 2011	January 2, 2012	
Acting		Davita E. Vance-Cooks	January 3, 2012	August 21, 2012	
27		Davita E. Vance-Cooks	August 21, 2012	December 17, 2014 (Note: December 17, 2014, is the date when the public printer of the Government Printing Office became the director of the Government Publishing Office.)	

=== Directors (since 2014) ===
No.	Image	Director	Term start	Term end	Refs.
1		Davita E. Vance-Cooks	December 17, 2014	November 1, 2017	
Acting		Jim Bradley	November 2, 2017	March 6, 2018	
Acting		Andrew M. Sherman	March 6, 2018	June 30, 2018	
Acting		Herbert H. Jackson, Jr.,	July 1, 2018	March 31, 2019	
Acting		John Crawford	April 1, 2019	December 10, 2019	
2		Hugh Nathanial Halpern	December 11, 2019	present	

Table notes
