= Davita Vance-Cooks =

American government official

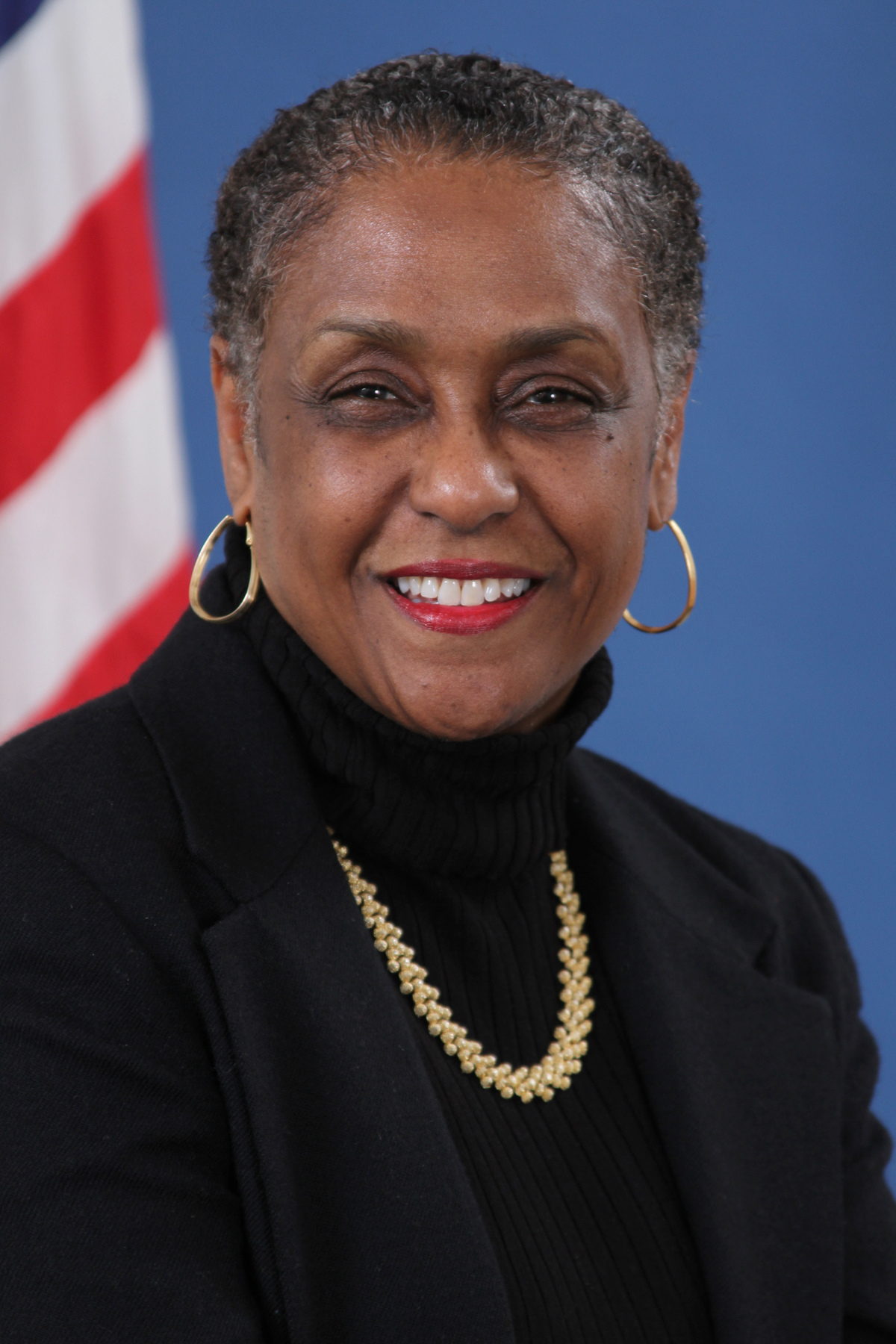

1st Director of the Government Publishing Office
- In office December 17, 2014 – November 1, 2017
- President: Barack Obama; Donald Trump
- Preceded by: Herself (as Public Printer)
- Succeeded by: Hugh Halpern

27th Public Printer of the United States
- In office August 1, 2013 – December 17, 2014; Acting: January 3, 2012 – August 1, 2013
- President: Barack Obama
- Preceded by: William Boarman
- Succeeded by: Herself (as Director)

Personal details
- Education: Tufts University (BA); Columbia University (MBA)

Davita Vance-Cooks is an American business executive who served as the 27th Public Printer of the United States and the 1st Director of the U.S. Government Publishing Office (GPO). Vance-Cooks is a business executive with more than 30 years of private sector and federal government management experience. She was the first woman and first African-American to lead the agency, whose mission since its establishment in 1861 is to Keep America Informed. As the provider of official federal government information in digital and printed formats, the GPO produces the Congressional Record, the Federal Register, U.S. passports, and a wide variety of other publications. The agency provides free public access to government information products through federal depository libraries nationwide as well as free online access via GPO's Federal Digital System.

== Biography ==
Vance-Cooks held a succession of senior management positions at the GPO since joining the agency in 2004. She served as the Deputy Managing Director of Customer Services, with the responsibility of overseeing the GPO's liaison with federal agencies for in-house print production and printing procurement services. She then served as the Managing Director of the GPO's Publications and Information Sales business unit, where she oversaw a large print distribution and supply chain operation with customers across the United States. In January 2011, Vance-Cooks was named the GPO's Chief of Staff. In that capacity she created and implemented GPO's strategic performance plan and oversaw a buyout program that reduced agency staffing levels by 15%.

In December 2011, Vance-Cooks was named Deputy Public Printer, and in that capacity she served as Acting Public Printer from January 2012-August 2013, the longest such tenure in the GPO's history. Under her leadership, the GPO has continued following a program of cutting costs while improving services, generating positive net income for the agency while expanding the availability of government information via mobile apps, bulk data download, and ebooks. Her focus was to move the GPO from a print-centric to a content-centric focus in the digital era, a strategy that was validated by a congressionally mandated study of the GPO by the National Academy of Public Administration, issued in January 2013. President Barack Obama nominated Vance-Cooks as Public Printer on May 9, 2013. The U.S. Senate confirmed her as the 27th Public Printer on August 1, 2013.

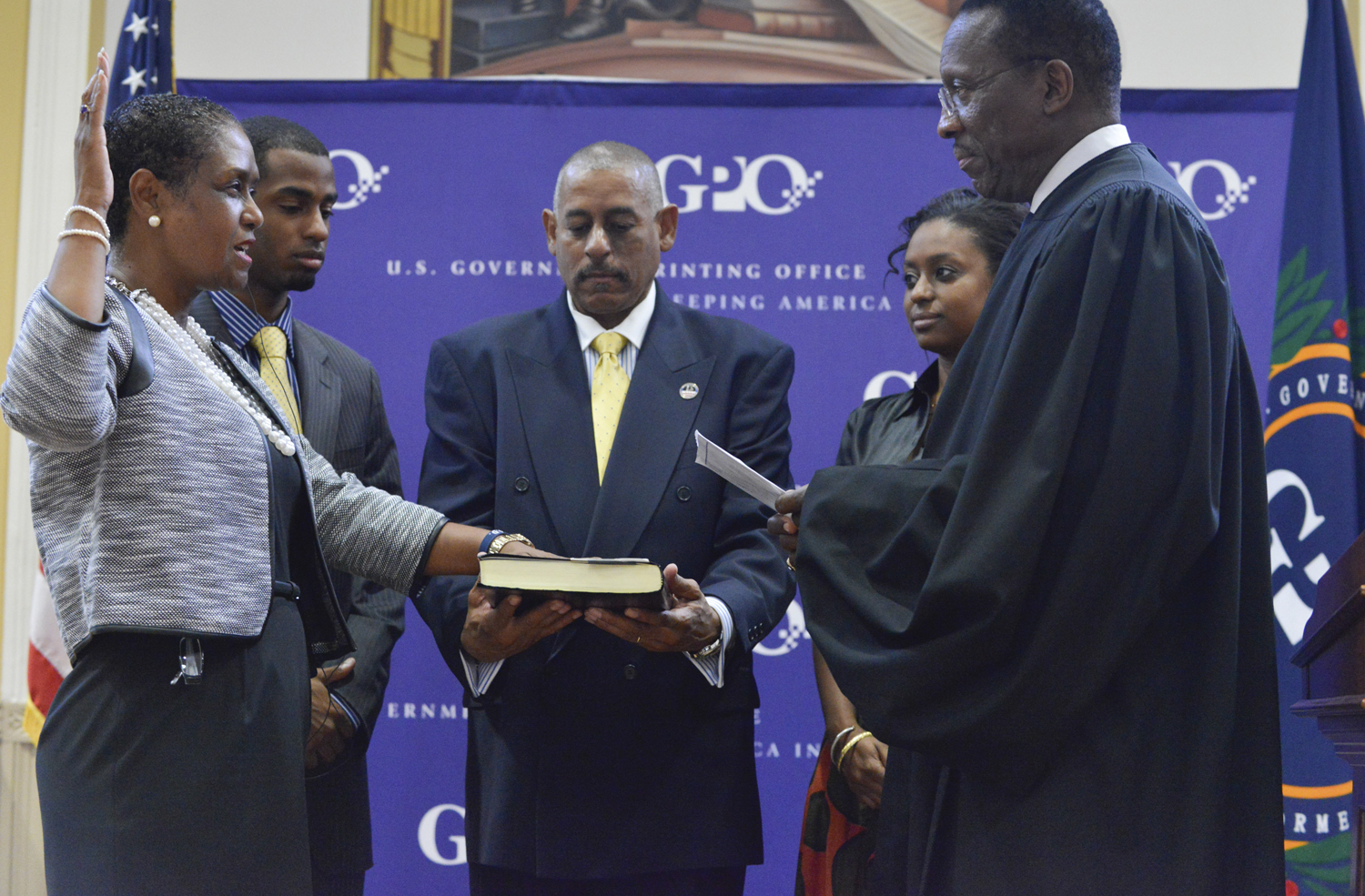
Davita Vance-Cooks is sworn in as the 27th Public Printer of the U.S. Government Printing Office.

Before coming to the GPO, Vance-Cooks held several private sector management positions in the health insurance industry. She was the Senior Vice-President of Operations for NYLCare MidAtlantic Health Plan where, among other duties, she was responsible for a digital print work center for production of variable data printing products. She also served as the Director of Customer Service and Claims, Director of Membership and Billing, and Director of Market Research and Product Development for Blue Cross Blue Shield Plans. She also served as the General Manager of HTH Worldwide Insurance Services.

Vance-Cooks holds a B.A. from Tufts University and an M.B.A. from Columbia University.
