= John D. Defrees =

American newspaperman and politician (1810–1882)

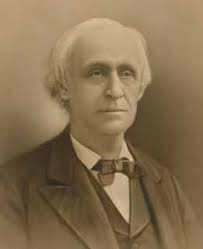
- Born: 1810; Sparta, Tennessee, U.S.
- Died: 1882 (aged 71–72)
- Resting place: Crown Hill Cemetery and Arboretum, Section 6, Lot 1 Indianapolis, Indiana, U.S. 39.8203612°N 86.1751056°W
- Occupations: Politician and newspaper publisher
- Title: Governor of Ohio Indiana State Senator
- Political party: Whiguntil party dissolved; Republican thereafter

So complete a system of government never before existed, and it became the admiration of the lovers of liberty throughout the world. The prayers of its founders, as they passed from earth, were for its perpetuity. It was received by their children and cherished as an inheritance above all price. With them the man who dared to lisp of its destruction was branded as a traitor and an enemy of mankind.

— John D. Defrees, 1864

John Dougherty Defrees (1810–1882) was an American newspaperman and politician.

== Political career ==
Born in Sparta, Tennessee, Defrees moved to Ohio and worked in the law office of Thomas Corwin, who would later serve as Governor of Ohio. In 1831, Defrees and his brother, Joseph, moved to South Bend, Indiana, where they founded the Northwestern Pioneer and St. Joseph Intelligencer, Northern Indiana's first newspaper.

== Newspaper career ==
In 1833, Defrees moved to White Pigeon, Michigan, and began publishing the Michigan Statesman and St. Joseph Chronicle, only the third newspaper published in the Michigan Territory and the first published between Chicago and Detroit. Under Defrees, the paper took a radical Democratic line and supported President Andrew Jackson. Defrees sold his interest in the paper in mid-1834 to Henry Gilbert, who later shortened its title to Michigan Statesman. The paper became the Kalamazoo Gazette in 1837, which, as of 2019, remains in publication.

Defrees returned to South Bend, was admitted to the Indiana bar, and became involved in Indiana state politics, winning election to the Indiana Senate as a Whig. In 1845, he bought the Indiana Journal (now The Indianapolis Star) which he also edited until he sold the paper a decade later, contributing editorials sharply critical of the Polk administration's conduct of the Mexican–American War. When the Whig Party collapsed in the early 1850s, Defrees became an important leader in the fusionist movement that established the Republican Party in Indiana. After divesting himself of the Journal, Defrees sought the Republican nomination for Indiana's 6th congressional district seat in House of Representatives in 1858, but lost to Albert G. Porter, who later became Governor of Indiana. Defrees subsequently founded the Indianapolis Atlas, which under his leadership promoted Edward Bates for the 1860 Republican presidential nomination, although Bates lost to Abraham Lincoln. Defrees sold the Atlas to the Journal in 1861 after President Lincoln named him superintendent of the newly created U.S. Government Printing Office.

== Civil war politics ==
Defrees was a vocal supporter of the Union and the government during the American Civil War. In those days, the Government Printing Office was a rich source of patronage, and Defrees' failure to satisfy members of Congress in that regard led to his removal in 1869, and the restructuring of the post of Public Printer. Previously, the President named the printer; now and to this day the Senate must approve the appointment.

Defrees backed Horace Greeley for president in 1872 and Rutherford B. Hayes in 1876; after his election, Hayes returned Defrees to the Printing Office, which post he held until April 1, 1882. Defrees retired to Berkeley Springs, West Virginia, where he had made his home since 1861, and died there October 19, 1882. He is buried in Crown Hill Cemetery in Indianapolis, Indiana.

Defrees was the brother of Joseph H. Defrees, who served in the United States House of Representatives.

== See also ==
- List of United States political families (D)#The Defrees and Frazers

Political offices
Preceded by Almon M. Clapp	Public Printer of the United States; 1877–1882	Succeeded by Sterling P. Rounds
