= John J. Boyle (printer) =

19th Public Printer of the United States

John Boyle
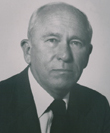

19th Public Printer of the United States
- In office November 1, 1977 – February 29, 1980
- President: Jimmy Carter; Ronald Reagan
- Preceded by: Thomas F. McCormick
- Succeeded by: Danford L. Sawyer, Jr.

Personal details
- Born: John Joseph Boyle; January 19, 1919; Honesdale, Pennsylvania
- Died: December 29, 2003 (aged 84); Silver Spring, Maryland
- Political party: Democratic

John Joseph Boyle was the 19th Public Printer of the United States, the head of the U.S. Government Printing Office (GPO), which produces and distributes information products for all branches of the U.S. Government.

== Early life ==
Boyle was born January 19, 1919, in Honesdale, Pennsylvania. He graduated from Hawley High School in Hawley, Pennsylvania, in 1936; he did not obtain a college degree. After high school, he worked in a print shop and for a local weekly newspaper. He joined the United States Army during World War II, serving in the First Armored Division. He served in the North African campaign, where he was captured, spending two and a half years in German prison camps. After the end of the war, he resumed his printing career, working for the O'Brana Press and the Scranton Tribune in Scranton in 1945, and then in a large printing plant for the publisher Haddon Craftsmen from 1945 to 1952.

== Government Printing Office career ==
In 1952, Public Printer Thomas F. McCormick hired Boyle to work in the Government Printing Office as a proofreader. He rose through the ranks, becoming deputy production manager for electronics and then production manager, and establishing the GPO's Electronic Photocomposition Division. In 1973, he was named Deputy Public Printer, the GPO's number-two position.

Upon McCormick's resignation, President Jimmy Carter nominated Boyle to be Public Printer of the United States. Boyle was confirmed by the Senate on October 27, and sworn in on November 1. He was the first Public Printer to rise through the ranks of agency craftsmen.

Boyle's term as Public Printer was marked by an acceleration of the GPO's computerization and electronic publication, and movement from manual metal typesetting to photocomposition. During his term, most congressional committee hearing proceedings were photocomposed, and all congressional bill printing had been converted to being electronically processed.

Boyle retired from the GPO February 29, 1980.

== Death ==
Boyle died from a stroke on December 29, 2003, at the Holy Cross Rehabilitation & Nursing Center in Silver Spring, Maryland. He was 84 years old.

Political offices
Preceded by Thomas F. McCormick	Public Printer of the United States; 1977–1980	Succeeded by Danford L. Sawyer, Jr.
