= Robert Tapella =

Former Public Printer of the United States

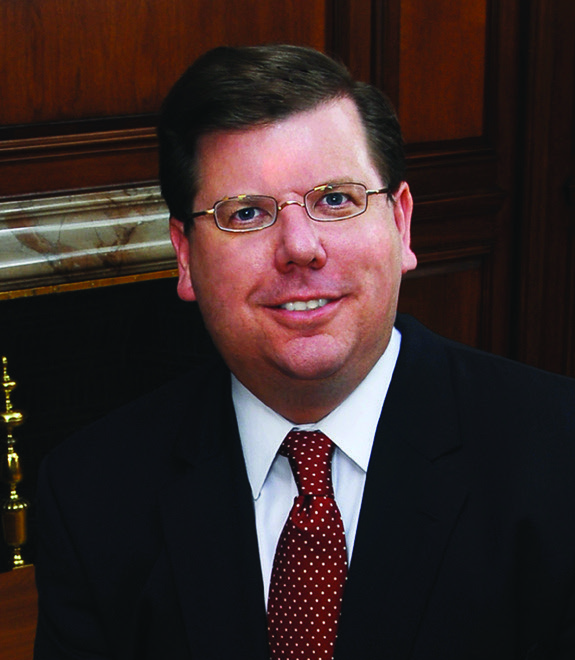

25th Public Printer of the United States
- In office October 4, 2007 – December 29, 2010
- President: George W. Bush; Barack Obama
- Preceded by: Bruce James
- Succeeded by: William J. Boarman

Personal details
- Born: Robert Charles Tapella
- Party: Republican
- Education: California Polytechnic State University, San Luis Obispo (BS)

Robert Charles Tapella is an American former public servant who served as the 25th Public Printer of the United States, the head of the U.S. Government Printing Office (GPO), which produces and distributes information products for all branches of the U.S. Government.

== Biography ==
He was a 1991 graduate of California Polytechnic State University, San Luis Obispo. Tapella worked as the campaign manager for the unsuccessful candidacy of Beth Rogers, the Republican nominee for Congress in California's 23rd district in 2002.

Tapella had worked at the GPO since 2002, first as deputy chief of staff until 2004, then as chief of staff until 2007. President George W. Bush nominated him for the position of Public Printer and he was confirmed by the U.S. Senate on October 4, 2007. Previously, he was a staff member in the U.S. House of Representatives. Tapella generated controversy when he commissioned a portrait of himself for more than $11,000.

On June 12, 2018, President Donald Trump announced his intent to nominate Tapella to serve as Director of the United States Government Publishing Office. On June 24, 2019, this nomination was withdrawn after failing to receive favorable consideration by the Senate Committee on Rules and Administration.
