= 1860 New York suffrage referendum =

New York ballot measure

New York black suffrage referendum
- November 6, 1860
- Question of Negro Suffrage

Results
Choice	Votes	%
Yes	197,889	36.40%
No	345,791	63.60%
Total votes	543,680	100.00%
County results
Yes
50-60%
60-70%
No
50-60%
60-70%
70-80%
80-90%
90-100%
Unknown/No Vote

A referendum on Black suffrage was held in New York in 1860. Voters were asked whether universal suffrage for Black men 21 years of age and older should be introduced. At the time, Black voters were required to meet certain property-owning criteria. Black men who owned the required amount of property could still vote in the state, and many did vote in the referendum.

The referendum question failed, with 64% voting against the change, and property restrictions to vote were maintained for Black voters.

The referendum was most heavily supported by voters in Upstate New York. The Five Boroughs of New York City, as well as most of the area around the city, voted against the proposed amendment.

Using township level data, opponents of suffrage were correlated with higher amounts of Dutch Reformed adherents (mostly located along the Hudson Valley) as well as Irish and German immigrants (mostly located in New York City). Proponents tended to be evangelicals and those of New England birth. The areas that had most stridently supported suffrage also tended to have lower concentrations of Black residents, as well as having little history with slavery (which had been concentrated in the Hudson Valley and New York City when it was legal). These trends had been similar in the 1846 referendum on suffrage.

== See also ==
- 1860 New York state election
- Universal suffrage
- Constitution of New York
