= Hugh Nathanial Halpern =

Director of the US Government Publishing Office

Hugh Halpern
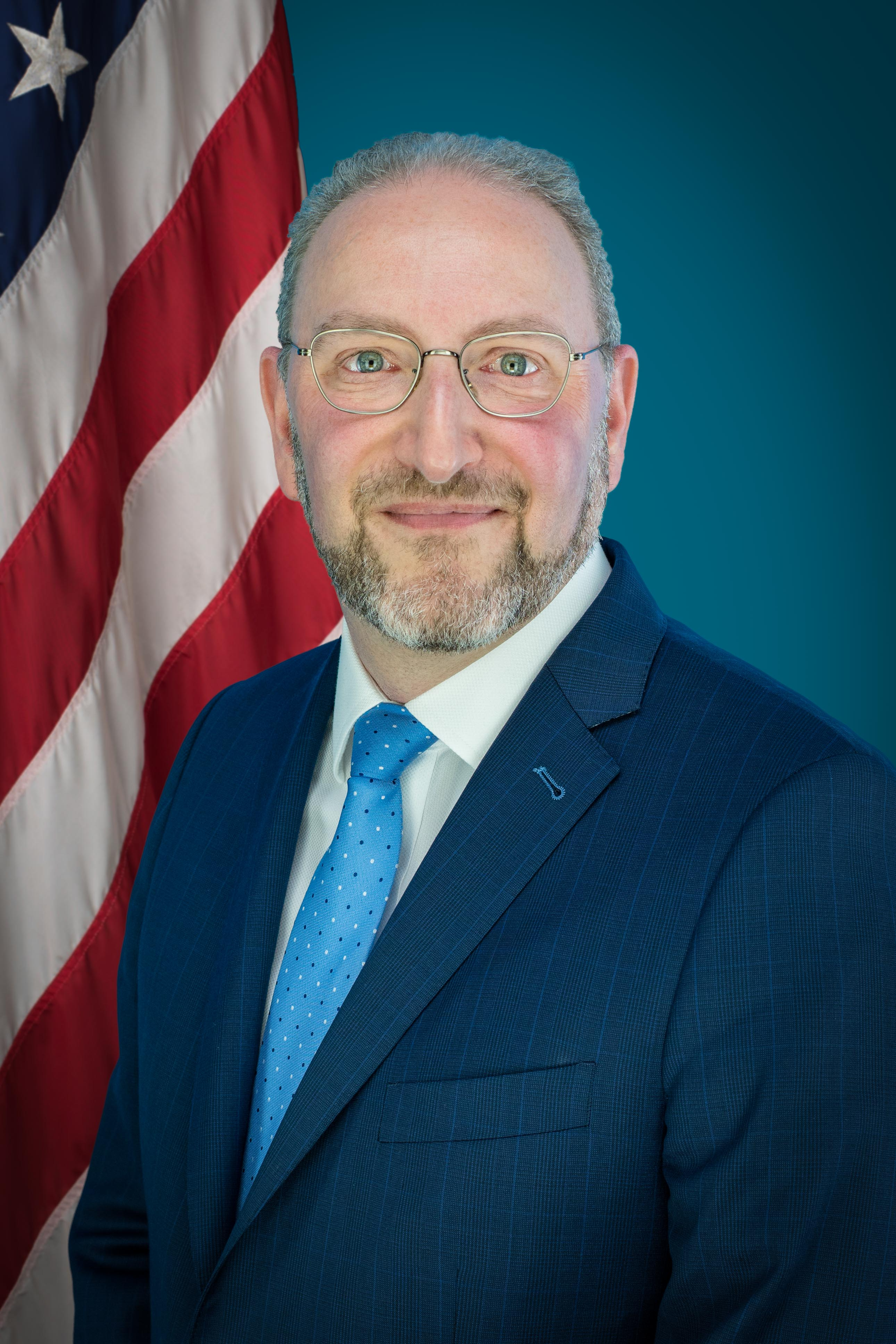

Director of the U.S. Government Publishing Office
- Incumbent
- Assumed office December 2019
- President: Donald Trump; Joe Biden; Donald Trump
- Preceded by: Davita Vance-Cooks

Personal details
- Education: American University (BA, MA); George Mason University (JD)

Hugh Nathanial Halpern is an American government official serving as the director of the United States Government Publishing Office. He is the 28th person to lead the agency.

== Early life and education ==
A native of Hollidaysburg, Pennsylvania, Halpern received bachelor’s and master’s degrees in political science from American University in 1991 and 1992, respectively. He also received a Juris Doctor degree from George Mason University Law School in 1997.

== Career ==
=== Government Publishing Office ===
Halpern was nominated by President Donald Trump to lead the United States Government Publishing Office on October 17, 2019, and the U.S. Senate confirmed him on December 4, 2019. In his role as director, he also serves as GPO's chief executive officer. He led the agency through the COVID-19 pandemic and created and implemented GPO SAFE, an approach to working in the COVID-19 era. During the pandemic, the agency got a Silver Stevie Award, for which companies nominate themselves. After a year of remote work by GPO employees, Halpern implemented a remote work policy that allowed eligible employees to work remotely full-time or work from somewhere outside the agency's headquarters in Washington, D.C.

During his time as GPO director, Halpern pledged to make Congressional documents more modern, which he has advocated will benefit both Congress and the public. Also during his tenure, GPO fully embraced its new digital publishing technology, XPub, that replaced GPO's more than 30-year-old MicroComp composition system.

=== U.S. House of Representatives ===
Prior to leading GPO, Halpern gained leadership experience on Capitol Hill, where he worked for 30 years and was a customer of GPO. In his role serving as director of floor operations for the speaker of the United States House of Representatives, Halpern was the highest-ranking floor staffer in the House. He served as Speaker Paul Ryan's chief advisor on all procedural matters, including managing daily operations of the House, serving as the principal liaison with the Senate for coordinating legislative strategy and supervising all events on the house floor. In 2018, he received the John W. McCormack Award of Excellence, which recognizes a lifetime of bipartisan service to the House.

During his career, he served half a dozen different committees in both policy development and procedural roles. During his 11 years on the United States House Committee on Rules, Halpern served as staff director leading the management and terms of debate on the House floor. In 2001, he was named general Counsel by chairman Mike Oxley for the newly-established United States House Committee on Financial Services. During his tenure, the committee provided legislation addressing terrorist financing and money laundering, improving investor confidence in the wake of the Enron and WorldCom scandals and granting consumers important new tools to fight identity theft. During the 1990s, Halpern served on the United States House Committee on Energy and Commerce, where he handled a variety of legislative issues, including automobile safety, insurance, FTC consumer protection, and tobacco regulation. Halpern began his career in Congress as an intern for Rep. Bud Shuster in 1987.

Halpern served a number of temporary positions during his time on Capitol Hill. He was the parliamentarian to the First Select Committee on Homeland Security, which created the United States Department of Homeland Security, general counsel to the United States House Select Committee on the Voting Irregularities of August 2, 2007, and assistant parliamentarian to the 2008, 2012, and 2016 Republican National Conventions.

Halpern has been included in Roll Call's list of 50 most powerful Congressional staffers 14 times and featured in a National Journal profile as one of "The New Power Players" on Capitol Hill.
