= William J. Boarman =

American printer and civil servant (1946–2021)

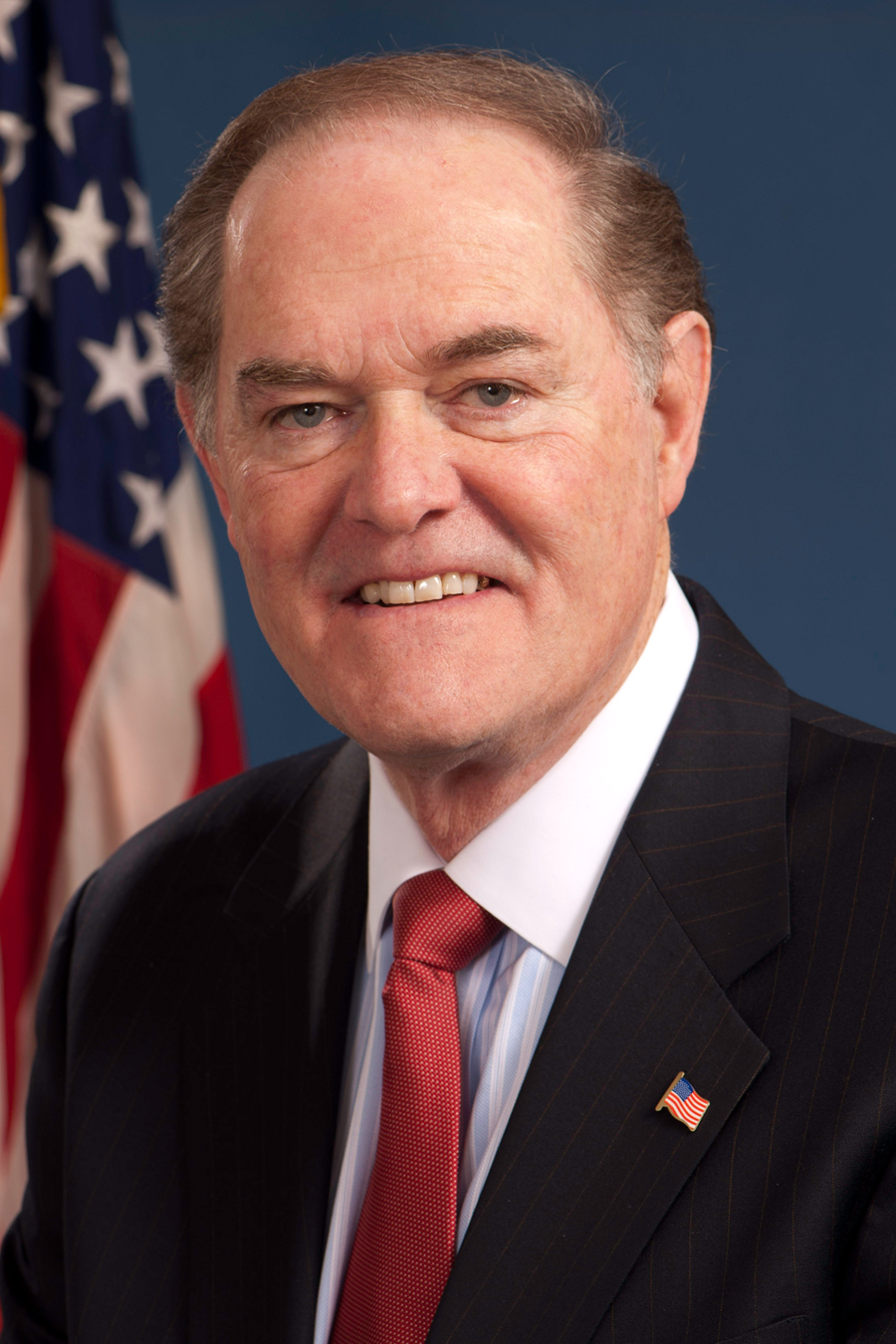

26th Public Printer of the United States
- In office December 29, 2010 – January 3, 2012
- President: Barack Obama
- Preceded by: Robert Tapella
- Succeeded by: Davita Vance-Cooks

Personal details
- Born: William Joseph Boarman; June 30, 1946 Hyattsville, Maryland, U.S.
- Died: August 22, 2021 (aged 75) Severna Park, Maryland, U.S.
- Party: Democratic
- Education: University of Maryland, Adelphi; American University; National Labor College

William Joseph Boarman (June 30, 1946 – August 22, 2021) was an American printer who served as the 26th Public Printer of the United States. Boarman was a labor union leader and government consultant, and served as senior vice-president of the Communications Workers of America (CWA) and president of that union's Printing, Publishing & Media Works Sector.

== Personal life ==
Boarman was born on June 30, 1946, in Washington, D.C., to Julien Norbert Boarman, a handyman and farmer, and Mary Frances (née Edwards), a homemaker. He was raised in Hyattsville, Maryland, attending Northwestern High School, where he was active in sports and drama—including the starring role in the school's 1964 senior class musical, The Music Man. His continuing education included: Printing Industry of Washington, DC, Printing Fundamentals – 1968; Four Year Union Printer Apprenticeship Program – McArdle Printing Company, 1971 Graduate; College level courses at the University of Maryland, University College, American University, and the George Meany University in Silver Spring Maryland; International Foundation Employees Benefit Educational Courses for Trustees, 1985, 1990, 1995 and 2005.

He was married for 31 years to Mary Frances Boarman (née Vandegrift), until her death from lymphoma on April 29, 2008. They had two children, Christopher and Lauren. He resided in Severna Park, Maryland with longtime partner Linda McNamara at the time of his death.

Boarman died on August 22, 2021, at the age of 75, after falling off his boat at a yacht club in Severna Park, Maryland.

== Career ==
Boarman's career in the printing industry spanned 40 years. A Practical Printer trained under the apprenticeship program of the International Typographical Union (ITU), he served his apprenticeship at McArdle Printing Company in Washington, D.C. In 1974, he accepted an appointment as a Journeyman Printer at the Government Printing Office (GPO).

Active in the union from the start of his career, Boarman moved up in the union's ranks as a local officer, and was elected President of his home Local 101–12, Columbia Typographical, when he was thirty years old. He later served as a national officer with the ITU (a vice-president in 1984) where he was a key negotiator for the ITU in the merger with the CWA in 1987. After becoming the president of ITU shortly prior to the merger, he was re-elected to seven more terms as head of the printing, publishing, and media sector in the merged organization.

Boarman served as an unpaid consultant to several Public Printers and testified before various congressional committees regarding GPO programs and policies as well as in confirmation hearings before the Senate Rules Committee. CWA President Larry Cohen praised Boarman's experience and his service to printing sector members and workers in the industry. "Bill brings an outstanding reservoir of knowledge to this work. He will be an outstanding Public Printer."

Boarman served as chairman of the $1 billion CWA/ITU Negotiated Pension Plan and the $125 million Canadian Negotiated Pension Plan. He was among the union leaders who spearheaded the creation of the AFL-CIO Capital Stewardship Program and the Center for Working Capital in the Federation. Because of his experience in the field of pension administration, Boarman was chosen to represent CWA on the Council of Institutional Investors (CII), serving 12 years as a member of the CII Executive Board and three terms as its co-chair.

He served as co-chair, Taft-Hartley Northern American Study Group educational investment conference in Australia, UK, Italy, Ireland and Canada (1996–2001); and was a founding member of the "Capital That Matters" Conference, Harvard Law School, 2003, and 2004.

Among the many other positions he held was President of the Union Printers Home, a 122-bed skilled nursing facility in Colorado Springs, Colorado.

At the time of his death in 2021, Boarman was serving a four-year term on the Anne Arundel County Board of Elections. His term began in 2019 and was slated to expire in 2023. He was also serving on the Maryland Commission on Judicial Disabilities.

== Public Printer of the United States ==
=== Nomination and appointment ===
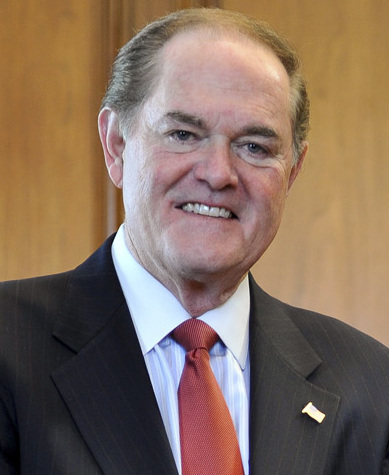
Boarman's first official portrait

In April 2010, The White House announced that President Barack Obama would nominate Boarman as the 26th Public Printer of the United States, succeeding the Honorable Robert Tapella. Boarman's nomination for this position was endorsed by House Majority Leader Steny Hoyer (D-Md) who said: "As a practiced and knowledgeable advocate for the GPO and its employees, Bill Boarman is an excellent choice to lead the GPO. I am pleased that the administration recognizes Bill's talents and am confident he will attract bipartisan support in the Senate."

The United States Senate Committee on Rules and Administration met July 20, 2010, to discuss Boarman's nomination, and voted to report favorably out of committee, with a recommendation to have the nomination confirmed by the Senate. The next required step would have been a Senate floor vote. On December 29, after the Senate failed to hold that vote, the President made Boarman the Public Printer by a recess appointment. The Washington Post announced that Boarman officially "took the helm of the Government Printing Office" on January 5, 2011, "returning after 37 years to the agency where he began his career as a proofreader."

=== Testimony about future challenges for GPO ===
During Boarman's confirmation process, he stated in his testimony to the Senate committee that, if confirmed as head of the GPO, he would face the challenge of maintaining traditional printing skills of an aging workforce while helping a 150-year-old organization adapt to a world in which most documents are "born digital":

"The GPO today is a substantially different agency compared with the one I left many years ago," Boarman said. "It employs fewer personnel but is significantly more technologically advanced, and it is responsible for a range of products and activities that could only have been dreamed of 30 years ago: Online databases of federal documents with state-of-the-art search and retrieval capabilities, passports and smart cards with electronic chips carrying biometric data, print products on sustainable paper using vegetable oil-based inks, a management infrastructure supported by the latest IT enterprise architecture, and more.... We have an aging workforce, and this is going to be a critical issue in the coming years.... We need to develop a program to recruit and replace the people we are going to lose in the next three to five years."

Boarman noted that Congress needs to revisit the 1962 law now covering the Federal Depository Library Program, in which more than 1,100 libraries throughout the country hold official documents from GPO. "Their walls are bulging now with books," and the program will have to adapt to deal with material that increasingly is being produced and accessed electronically.

=== Statements during swearing-in ceremony ===
At his January 2011 swearing-in ceremony, Boarman said that "Keeping America informed is a function rooted in the Constitution, and it's one of the great national purposes served by this agency." He referenced the 1923 poem by Beatrice Warde, "This is a printing office," which concludes: "From this place words may fly abroad, not to perish on waves of sound, not to vary with the writer's hand, but fixed in time, having been verified by proof: Friend, you stand on sacred ground," and then continued:

We still print—using processes that are thoroughly computerized—but we also use digital technology in new and exciting ways. The forms and capabilities of that technology continue to grow, and we embrace them to carry out our job.... But we never forget that the principles of our work are enshrined in Warde's poem, and whether what we do is in print or in bits and bytes, and whether in the long run we call it a printing office or an information office, we never forget that we stand on sacred ground, and that we are here to serve.

=== Achievements ===
Because efforts to control the Federal deficit were of such importance during the time Boarman began serving in this position, he "imposed changes to cut costs and rein in GPO's spending, particularly in overhead costs." In addition to specific cuts, he "realigned management to have the Chief Financial Officer report directly to him, and implemented a task force to recover outstanding payments, known as 'chargebacks,' from Federal agencies."

Additionally, he started a series of meetings with Senators and Representatives to study the information product needs of Congress, including a survey of the need for hard copies of products such as the Congressional Record. Under his leadership, GPO launched a Facebook page and increased publications available online, including those available through GPO's partnership with Google Books.

==== Keeping America Informed ====
Under Boarman's leadership, the GPO published Keeping America Informed, an official history of the organization on the occasion of its 150th anniversary—and the first such publication since its earlier 100th anniversary volume. In the final paragraph of the foreword he wrote for this volume, Boarman shared his vision of the organization and the men and women who work and worked for it:

Keeping America Informed is a portrait of the generations of men and women who have worked here as compositors, proofreaders, platemakers, press operators, bookbinders, printing plant workers, librarians, engineering and maintenance staff, accountants, information technology technicians, personnel specialists, police officers, and all the other functions required by GPO. Few Federal agencies can count as their heritage the scope of the work GPO has performed, ranging from the first printing of the Emancipation Proclamation to providing digital access to the Government's publications today. The men and women of GPO are responsible for that heritage. Keeping America Informed is a new telling of their story and their enduring achievements.

=== End of appointment ===
Boarman's recess appointment was never confirmed by the Senate, which is required by law before the end of the next Senate term, forcing him to step down at the end of a one-year term in December 2011, with an official end of service date of January 3, 2012. Senate Majority Leader Harry Reid recognized Boarman for his accomplishments during his time as Public Printer and House Minority Whip Steny Hoyer praised Boarman for transforming the GPO. On December 20, 2011, Boarman appointed Davita Vance-Cooks as deputy director and Acting Public Printer; upon Boarman's departure shortly afterwards, she became the first woman to lead the agency in its 150 years of history.

Political offices
Preceded by Robert Tapella	Public Printer of the United States; 2010–2011	Succeeded by Davita Vance-Cooks
