= James K. Bates =

American physician

James K. Bates (1806 – 1872) was an American medical doctor and politician from New York.

== Life ==
James K. Bates was born on June 24, 1806 in Windham County, Connecticut. He was the son of James Bates and Linda (Fairbanks) Bates (b. 1781). He married Serena L. Massey and they had three children.

He was an Inspector of State Prisons from 1861 to 1866, elected in 1860 on the Republican ticket, and in 1863 on the Union ticket.

He died on June 30, 1872 in Watertown, New York.

== Sources ==
- The New York Civil List compiled by Franklin Benjamin Hough, Stephen C. Hutchins and Edgar Albert Werner (1867; pages 411 and 536)
- Bates genealogy, at Family Origins [gives Thompson, Connecticut as birthplace]
- Genealogy of the Fairbanks Family in America, 1633-1897 by Lorenzo Sayles Fairbanks (Printed for the author by the American Print. and Engraving Co., 1897)
- The Growth of a Century: As Illustrated in the History of Jefferson County, New York, from 1793 to 1894 by John A Haddock & Eli Thayer (Weed-Parsons Printing Company, 1894) [gives Killingly, Connecticut as birthplace]
- Death notice of his daughter Frances J. Bates, aged 20, in NYT on December 25, 1856
