= Gideon J. Tucker =

American politician (1826–1899)

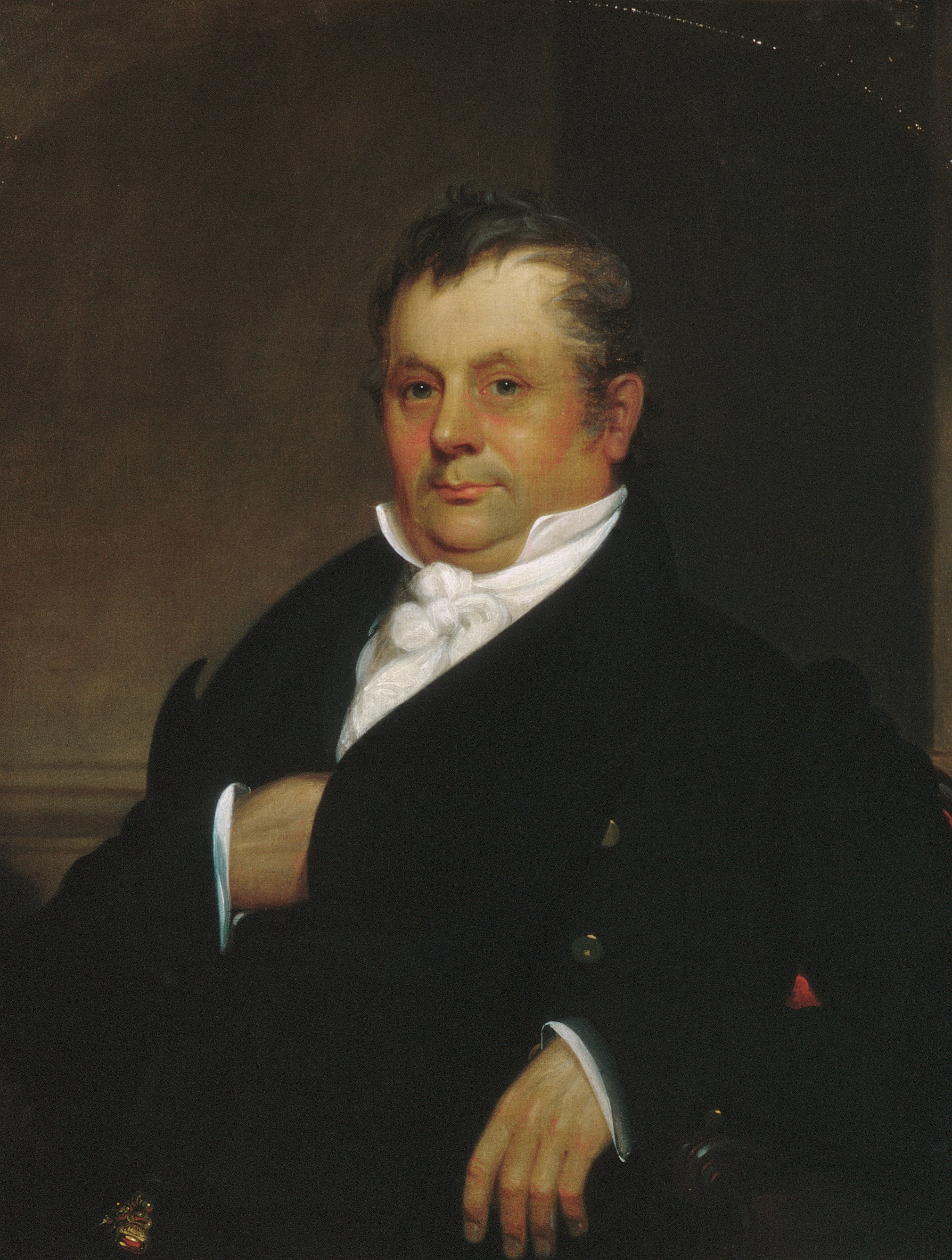
Gideon J. Tucker

Gideon John Tucker (February 10, 1826 – July 1899) was an American lawyer, newspaper editor and politician. In 1866, as Surrogate of New York County, he wrote in a decision on a legal malpractice claim against a deceased lawyer's estate: "No man's life, liberty or property are safe while the Legislature is in session."

== Life ==
He was born on Laight Street, near Canal Street in Lower Manhattan, New York City, on February 10, 1826, the son of Alderman John C. Tucker, a leader of the Locofocos. In 1844, he became a lawyer's clerk and subsequently wrote for newspapers. In 1847, he was admitted to the bar. On March 15, 1848, he married Clara L. Livingston (b. October 10, 1828). In 1852, he became a tax clerk in the office of the New York State Comptroller at Albany, New York. In 1853, he bought an interest in the Albany Argus from Edwin Croswell, but in 1855 sold his part and founded the New York Daily News, but withdrew from the editorship in September 1857.

He was a delegate to the 1856 Democratic National Convention at Cincinnati, Ohio. In 1857, he was elected a Sachem of the Tammany Society, and later the same year was elected Secretary of State of New York In 1860, Tucker was nominated as President of the Board of Commissioners of the Croton Aqueduct Department, but the Board of Aldermen rejected the appointment.

He was Surrogate of New York County from 1863 to 1869. He was a delegate to the 1864 Democratic National Convention. He was a member of the New York State Assembly (New York Co., 14th D.). Here he drafted the first Eight-Hour Work Bill, which was ultimately defeated, but he carried through the law for the prevention of cruelty to animals.

In 1875, he left Tammany Hall, and was among the founders of the opposing Irving Hall faction of the Democratic Party.

In 1878, he ran on the National Greenback and Labor Party ticket for associate judge of the New York Court of Appeals, but was defeated. Afterwards he went to Arizona for his health and edited the Daily Democrat at Prescott, then the capital of the Arizona Territory. He returned in the 1880s to New York. In November 1887, he ran again for Surrogate, this time on the United Labor ticket, but was defeated by Democrat Rastus S. Ransom.

He died in July 1899 at his home at 162 West 84th Street in New York City.

== Sources ==
- Political Graveyard
- The Greenback convention with Short bio of Tucker, in NYT on July 25, 1878
- His nomination by the Greenbacks, in NYT on August 9, 1878
- A List of the Candidates on the Various Tickets in NYT on November 7, 1887
- His golden wedding, in NYT on March 16, 1898
- His obit, in NYT on July 26, 1899
- Biographical Sketches of the State Officers and Members of the Legislature in the State of New York in 1859 by Wm. D. Murphy (pages 12ff; C. Van Benthuysen, Albany NY, 1859)

Political offices
Preceded by Joel T. Headley	New York Secretary of State; 1858–1859	Succeeded by David R. Floyd-Jones
