= Samuel H. Barnes =

American politician

- Born: 1808; Norwich, Chenango County, New York, United States
- Died: November 13, 1860 (aged 51–52)
- Occupation: politician
- Political party: Republican
- Spouse: Harriet Pellet
- Children: 6

Samuel Howe Barnes (1808 – November 13, 1860, in Norwich, Chenango County, New York) was an American politician from New York.

== Life ==
He married Harriet Pellet and they had six children.

On November 6, 1860, he was elected a Canal Commissioner on the Republican ticket, but died a week later, before the beginning of his term.

== Sources ==
- Chenango County Civil List, at RootsWeb
- The New York Civil List compiled by Franklin Benjamin Hough, Stephen C. Hutchins and Edgar Albert Werner (1867; page 406)
- History of Norwich, Chenango Co.
- The tickets, in NYT on November 5, 1860
