= Gunning S. Bedford =

American obstetrician, gynecologist, and surgeon

- Born: 1806
- Died: 5 September 1870 (aged 63–64)
- Education: Mount Saint Mary's University
- Scientific career
- Fields: medicine
- Workplaces: Charleston Medical College

Gunning S. Bedford (1806 - 5 September 1870) was a medical writer, teacher and founder of the United States' first obstetrical clinic for those too poor to pay a doctor's fee.

Bedford graduated in 1825 at Mount Saint Mary's University (then Mount Saint Mary's College), Emmitsburg, Maryland, and took his medical degree from Rutgers College. He spent two years studying outside the United States and in 1833 became professor of obstetrics in Charleston Medical College. After this he became a professor in the Albany Medical College.

He later founded the University Medical College in which he established an obstetrical clinic for those too poor to afford a doctor which was the first of in the United States. He retired from teaching for health reasons in 1862 and he died in 1870. His funeral panegyric was preached by Archbishop John McCloskey a fellow student at Mount St. Mary's.

Two books written by him, "Diseases of Women" and "Practice of Obstetrics" went through a number of editions, were translated into French and German and adopted as textbooks in American schools.

His son Gunning S. Bedford (1837–1893) was Assistant New York County District Attorney under A. Oakey Hall from 1865 to 1868, a New York City judge from 1869 to 1878, and again Asst. D.A. under Randolph B. Martine, John R. Fellows and De Lancey Nicoll from 1885 until his death.

His uncle Gunning Bedford was one of the framers of the United States Constitution; another uncle, also named Gunning Bedford, was an aide-de-camp to General George Washington and later became the Governor of Delaware.

== Notes ==
- Ryan, Joseph G (August 2008). "Doctor Gunning S Bedford (1806–70) and the search for safe obstetric care, 1833–70". Journal of Medical Biography. 16 (3). England: 134–43. doi:10.1258/jmb.2007.007035. ISSN 0967-7720. PMID 18653831. S2CID 25374703.
- OBITUARY.; Ex-Judge Gunning S. Bedford in NYT on October 30, 1893
