= Vernon M. Davis =

Vernon Mansfield Davis
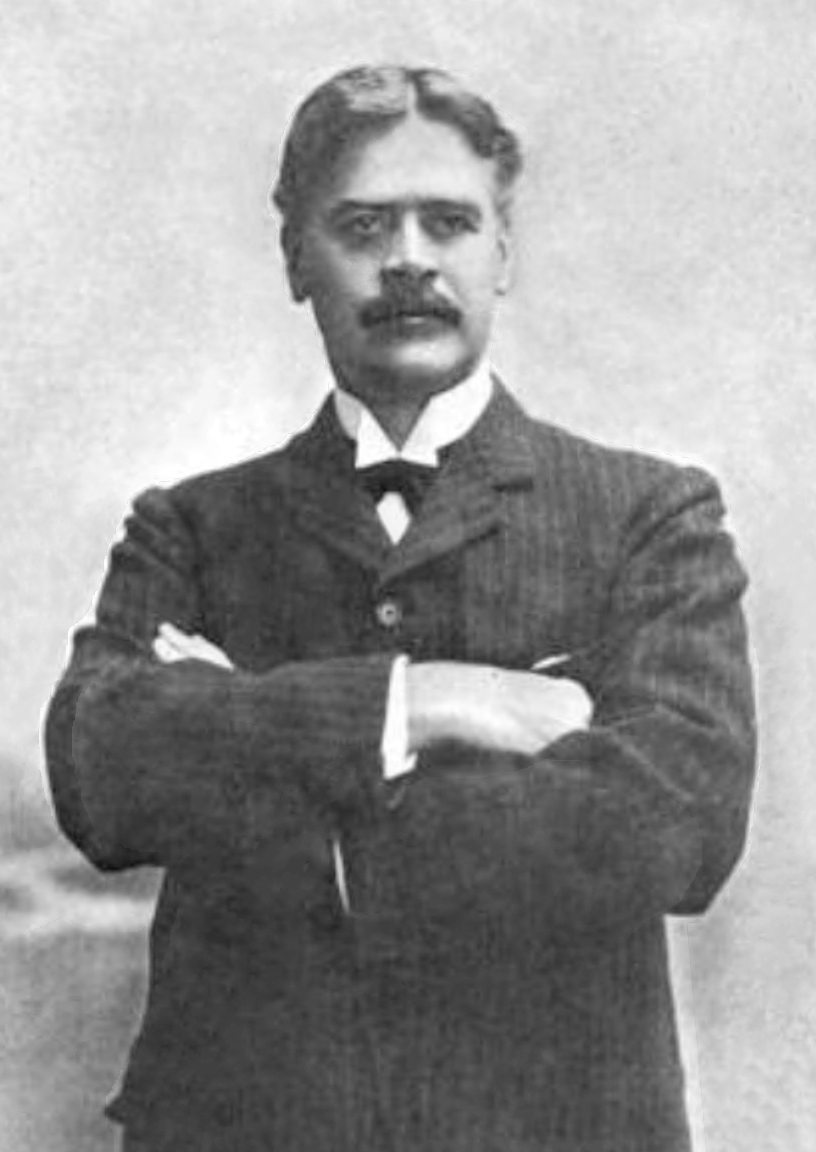

New York County District Attorney Acting
- In office December 7, 1896 – December 19 1896
- Preceded by: John R. Fellows
- Succeeded by: William M. K. Olcott

Personal details
- Born: January 29, 1855 New York City, U.S.
- Died: April 17, 1931 (aged 76) New York City, U.S.
- Resting place: Woodlawn Cemetery
- Spouse: Harriet Lobdell (m. 1885; died 1920)
- Parent(s): Robert Vernon Davis; Mary Samler Davis
- Education: City College of New York; Columbia Law School

Vernon Mansfield Davis (January 29, 1855 – April 17, 1931) was an American lawyer and politician from New York.

== Early life ==
Davis was born on January 29, 1855, in New York City. He was the son of Robert Vernon Davis (1830–1913) and Mary (née Samler) Davis (1837–1912). A descendant of "old New York" families, his maternal grandparents were Jane Ogden (née Mansfield) Samler and Nicholas Samler, a grandson of Casper Samler, who owned land that today comprises the greater part of Fifth Avenue from Madison Square to 31st Street.

After attending public and private schools in New York, he graduated from City College in 1876.

== Career ==
After graduating from City College, Davis remained there becoming Assistant Professor of Greek, Mathematics and Logic until 1882. At the same time he studied law, graduated from Columbia Law School, and was admitted to the bar in 1879. He commenced practice working for the law firm of McDaniel, Wheeler & Souther. In October 1881, he opened his own law firm known as Davis, Cohen & McWilliam.

In January 1885, Davis was appointed by D.A. Randolph B. Martine a Deputy Assistant New York County District Attorney. In January 1888, D.A. John R. Fellows appointed Davis an Assistant D.A., and he remained in office under De Lancey Nicoll and during Fellows's second term. After Fellows's death on December 7, 1896, Davis was appointed Acting D.A. by the Court of General Sessions, pending the filling of the vacancy by Gov. Levi P. Morton. On December 19, 1896, Gov. Morton appointed Alderman William M.K. Olcott as D.A., and Davis resumed his post as Asst. D.A. until his resignation in April 1897.

On January 1, 1901, Davis succeeded Elbridge T. Gerry as President of the New York Society for the Prevention of Cruelty to Children, but resigned this post after his election to the Supreme Court.

In November 1902, Davis was elected a justice of the New York Supreme Court (1st D.), and remained on the bench until the end of 1925 when he reached the constitutional age limit.

== Personal life ==
On June 17, 1885, Davis was married to Harriet Lobdell (1863–1920). She was a daughter of the Rev. Dr. Francis Lobdell and Julia Almira (née Danforth) Lobdell, both from Connecticut. Her father was rector of St. Andrew's Church in New York City before moving to Buffalo, New York, where he was at Trinity Church and became Archdeacon of Buffalo.

After a four-month illness, he died from pneumonia at his home at 6 East 94th Street in New York City. After a funeral in St. Agnes Chapel of Trinity Parish on 92nd Street, he was buried at Woodlawn Cemetery in the Bronx.

Legal offices
Preceded by John R. Fellows	New York County District Attorney; Acting; 1896	Succeeded by William M. K. Olcott
