= Eben Erskine Olcott =

American mining engineer (1854–1929)

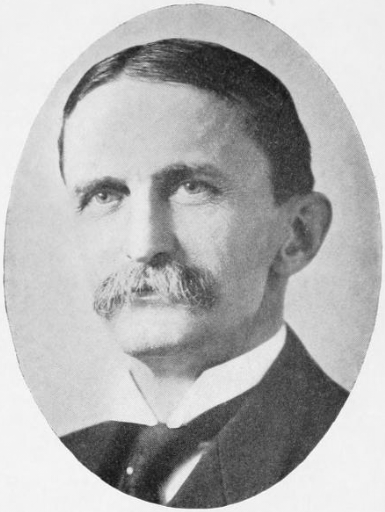
- Born: March 11, 1854; Brooklyn, New York, U.S.
- Died: June 7, 1929 (aged 75); New York City, New York, U.S.
- Education: Columbia University
- Occupations: Mining engineer; investment banker; businessman
- Title: President of the American Institute of Mining, Metallurgical, and Petroleum Engineers (1901-02)
- Relatives: Alfred Van Santvoord (father-in-law); William M. K. Olcott (brother); J. Van Vechten Olcott (brother); Van Santvoord Merle-Smith (nephew)

Eben Erskine Olcott (March 11, 1854 – June 7, 1929) was an American mining engineer. He was president of the Hudson River Day Line and served as two-time president of the American Institute of Mining, Metallurgical, and Petroleum Engineers in 1901–02.

== Early life and education ==
Olcott was born on March 11, 1854, in New York City. He was a descendant of the Olcott family, which settled in Connecticut in the 17th century. His siblings included future New York County District Attorney William M. K. Olcott and Congressman J. Van Vechten Olcott. He was educated in the public schools and graduated from Columbia School of Mines in 1874.

== Career ==
Olcott began his engineering career as a chemist in charge of a Hunt and Douglas plant in North Carolina. After one year, he then became an assistant superintendent at Pennsylvania Lead Works in Pittsburgh. He later became superintendent of gold mines in Venezuela and held a similar role in San Juan County, Colorado. He spent a year examining mines in Western United States before becoming manager of the Santa Elena mine in Sonora, Mexico.

Olcott opened an office in 1885 as consultant engineer with Robert Peele that became Olcott, Corning & Peele. He was responsible for developing the gold mines in Dutch Guiana and was a member of the Cerro de Pasco Mining Commission. He also explored the Sandia and Carrabaya gold regions of Peru and the Huantajaya silver mines of Chile among his missions to South America.

In 1895, Olcott became manager of the Hudson River Day Lines that connected New York City and Albany, New York. He also pursued a career in banking, serving as a vice president of Lincoln Safe Deposit Company and was a member of the advisory board of Irving Trust and director of Catskill Evening Line.

Olcott was elected president of the American Institute of Mining, Metallurgical, and Petroleum Engineers in 1901 and 1902. He was also a president of the United Engineering Society.

Olcott was a member of the American Society of Civil Engineers. He sat on the boards of the American Geographical Society, Reformed Church in America, American Bible Society, Metropolitan Museum of Art and was a member of the University Club of New York and Union League Club. He also belonged to the Sons of the American Revolution, Pilgrims Society, and Saint Nicholas Society of the City of New York.

== Personal life ==
Olcott married Katharine Lawrence Van Santvoord, daughter of the steamboat businessman Alfred Van Santvoord. The couple had three children. He died on June 7, 1929, in New York City, at age 76. His nephew was Van Santvoord Merle-Smith, who served as Third Assistant Secretary of State under President Woodrow Wilson.
