= Gunning Bedford =

Gunning Bedford may refer to:

- Gunning Bedford Sr. (1742–1797), American lawyer and Governor of Delaware
- Gunning Bedford Jr. (1747–1812), American lawyer and delegate to the Constitutional Convention of 1787
- Gunning S. Bedford (1806–1870), American medical writer and teacher
