= John R. Fellows =

American politician

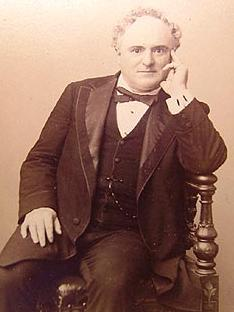

New York County District Attorney
- In office 1888–1890
- Preceded by: Randolph B. Martine
- Succeeded by: De Lancey Nicoll
- In office 1894–1896
- Preceded by: De Lancey Nicoll
- Succeeded by: Vernon M. Davis (acting)

Member of the U.S. House of Representatives from New York
- In office March 4, 1891 – December 31, 1893
- Preceded by: Charles H. Turner
- Succeeded by: Lemuel E. Quigg
- Constituency: 6th district (1891–93); 14th district (1893)

Member of the Arkansas Senate
- In office 1866-1867

Personal details
- Born: July 29, 1832 Troy, New York, U.S.
- Died: December 7, 1896 (aged 64) New York City, New York, U.S.
- Resting place: Trinity Church Cemetery
- Party: Democratic

John R. Fellows (July 29, 1832 – December 7, 1896) was an American lawyer and politician from Arkansas and New York. He served as New York County District Attorney (1888–1890, 1894–1896), and a member of Congress from New York (1891–1893).

== Early life ==
He was the son of Tisdale Eddy Fellows (1800–1874), farmer and later Superintendent of the Halfmoon Cemetery, and Eliza (Harris) Fellows (1809–1867). The family moved to a farm in Stillwater (a part which is now in the city of Mechanicville. New York) in Saratoga County, New York, where he attended the country schools. Among his playmates was Elmer E. Ellsworth.

== Career in Arkansas ==
In 1850, Fellows went to Camden, Ouachita County, Arkansas, to live with his uncle. There he studied law and was admitted to the bar in 1855. At one time he practiced law in partnership with Walter L. Bragg.

He ran for presidential elector on the Constitutional Union ticket of Bell and Everett in 1860, but Arkansas was carried by John C. Breckinridge. He was a delegate to the State secession convention in 1861.

=== Civil War ===
He enlisted in the 1st Arkansas Infantry Regiment of the Confederate States Army. After the Battle of Shiloh, he was made a colonel and assigned to staff duties as assistant adjutant to Gen. William Beall. Later he was inspector general at Port Hudson, Louisiana, and was captured there on July 9, 1863. He was kept a prisoner of war until the end of the American Civil War, and released on June 10, 1865.

=== After the war ===
Afterwards he resumed the practice of law in Camden. He was a member of the Arkansas Senate from 1866 to 1867. On July 4, 1867, he married Lizzie Reynolds, and they had six children.

== Career in New York ==
He was a delegate to the 1868 Democratic National Convention, held at the new Tammany Hall building in New York City, and was noticed by Tammany boss William M. Tweed as an eloquent campaign speaker. Urged by Tweed, Fellows removed to New York City to continue the practice of law there and to campaign for the Tammany organization.

=== Legal career ===
Tweed secured Fellows's appointment in 1868 by Corporation Counsel Richard O'Gorman (1821–1895) as Assistant C.C., and in 1869, D.A. Samuel B. Garvin appointed Fellows an Assistant New York County District Attorney. He remained in this office until the end of 1872 when Garvin's term expired and a Republican D.A. succeeded. After the fall of Tweed, Fellows left Tammany and joined the Anti-Tammany Democrats in New York City, at times known as the "Young Democracy", the "County Democracy" and "Irving Hall".

Fellows was re-appointed Assistant D.A. in 1882 by D.A. John McKeon, and remained on this post under John Vincent, Wheeler H. Peckham, Peter B. Olney and Randolph B. Martine. Fellows was elected on the Tammany and County Democracy tickets D.A. in November 1887, defeating his fellow Assistant D.A. De Lancey Nicoll who was a Democrat but ran on the Republican ticket. During the fiercely fought election campaign, two letters Fellows had written to Boss Tweed on February 1, 1873, asking for a loan of $523, (~$14,056 in 2025) were published in The New York Times, with the comment that this was the payment for Fellows's service in having the jury disagree on a verdict against Tweed on the previous day, and that the "loan" was never paid back. Fellows was D.A. from 1888 to 1890, but did not run for re-election in November 1890, preferring to rejoin Tammany Hall and to run for Congress instead. Nicoll was then elected on the Tammany ticket to succeed as D.A.

=== Congress ===
Fellows was elected as a Democrat to the 52nd and 53rd United States Congresses, serving from March 4, 1891, until his resignation, effective December 31, 1893.

=== Later career ===
He was again elected on the Tammany ticket New York County D.A., and took office on January 1, 1894. He had been a delegate to all Democratic National Conventions from 1868 on. He also was a delegate to the 1896 Democratic National Convention but repudiated William Jennings Bryan, the Democratic candidate nominated on a Free Silver platform and joined the "Gold Democrats". In September 1896, he was a delegate to the National Democratic Convention in Indianapolis which nominated the Palmer - Buckner ticket for the 1896 United States presidential election.

== Death and burial ==
Fellows died on December 7, 1896, at his home at 610, West 152nd Street in New York City from stomach cancer; and was buried at the Trinity Church Cemetery.

== Sources ==
- United States Congress. "John R. Fellows (id: F000067)". Biographical Directory of the United States Congress.
- Civil War info
- Civil War Soldiers and Sailors System at the National Park Service
- FAC SIMILES OF JOHN R. FELLOWS'S LETTERS TO TWEED in NYT on November 5, 1887
- KEEP THEM BEFORE THE PEOPLE.; THE LETTERS JOHN R. FELLOWS WROTE TO WILLIAM M. TWEED in NYT on November 6, 1887
- COL. JOHN R. FELLOWS DEAD in NYT on December 8, 1896
- FUNERAL OF COL. FELLOWS in NYT on December 9, 1896
- BURIAL OF COL. FELLOWS in NYT on December 10, 1896

Legal offices
Preceded by Randolph B. Martine	New York County District Attorney; 1888–1890	Succeeded by De Lancey Nicoll
U.S. House of Representatives
Preceded by Charles H. Turner	Member of the U.S. House of Representatives from New York's 6th congressional district 1891–1893	Succeeded by Thomas F. Magner
Preceded by William G. Stahlnecker	Member of the U.S. House of Representatives from New York's 14th congressional district 1893	Succeeded by Lemuel E. Quigg
Legal offices
Preceded by De Lancey Nicoll	New York County District Attorney; 1894–1896	Succeeded by Vernon M. Davis; Acting
