= Yearbook =

Publication documenting events of a year

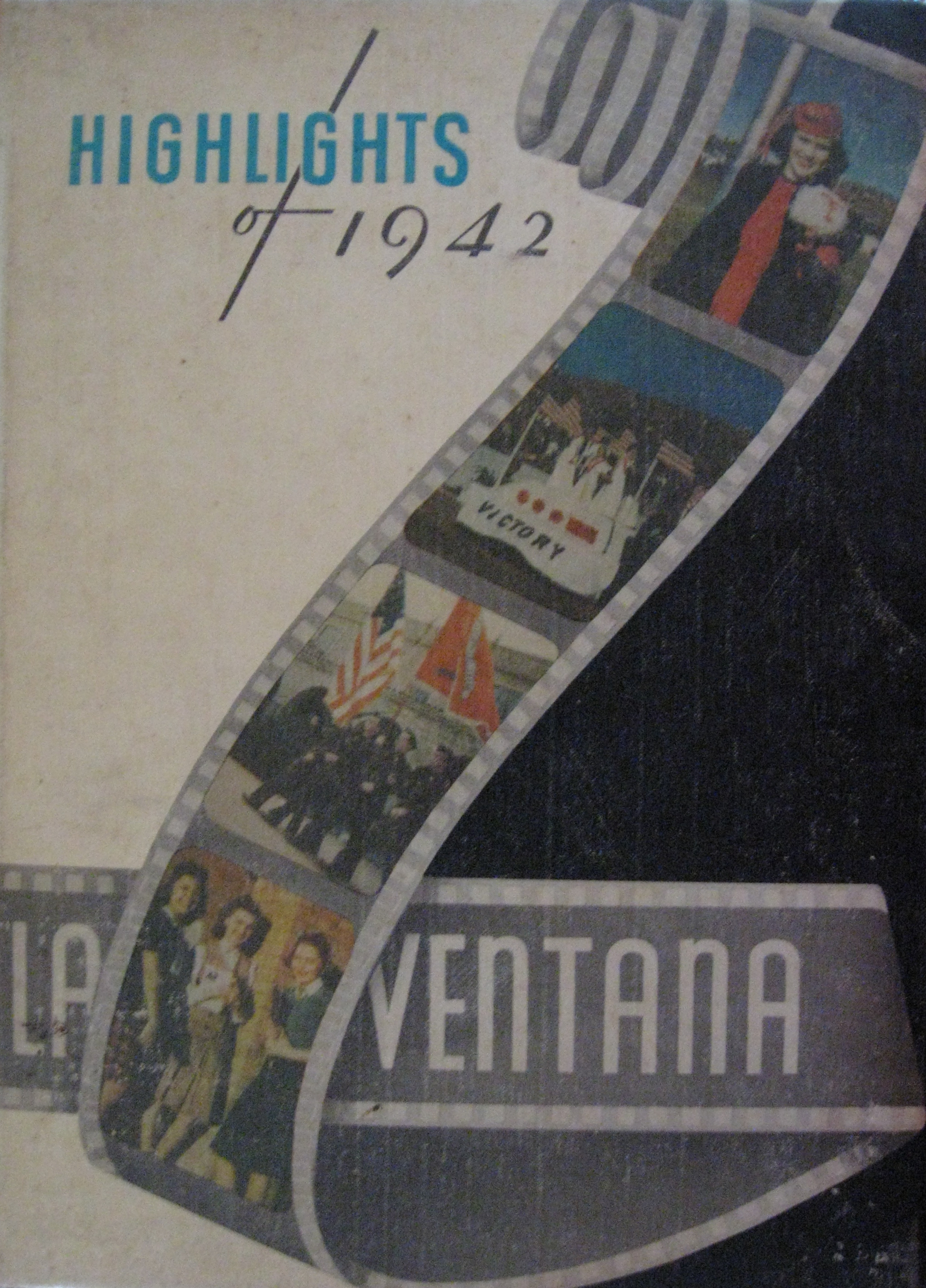
A 1942 copy of La Ventana, the yearbook of Texas Technological College, later renamed Texas Tech University

A yearbook, also known as an annual, is a type of book published annually. One use is to record, highlight, and commemorate the past year of a school. The term also refers to an annual book of statistics or facts. A yearbook often has an overarching theme that runs throughout.

Many high schools, colleges, elementary and middle schools publish yearbooks; however, many schools are dropping yearbooks or decreasing page counts given social media alternatives to a mass-produced physical photographically oriented record. From 1995 to 2013, the number of U.S. college yearbooks dropped from roughly 2,400 to 1,000.

== History ==
A marble slab commemorating a class of military cadets in Ancient Athens during the Roman Empire is an early example of this type of document. Proto-yearbooks in the form of scrapbooks appeared in New England colonial schools near the end of the 17th century. The first formal modern yearbook was the 1806 Profiles of Part of the Class Graduated at Yale College. Because printed photography had not yet existed, the 1806 Yale College yearbook included students' silhouettes.

== Yearbooks by country ==
=== Australia ===
Australian schools may produce magazines or publications in a variety of formats for the school body, reporting events throughout the school year. These may be a regular magazine series or a yearly publication often called a magazine or having a unique title. The contents may include staff, student, prefect and team lists, major event and excursion reports, photos, poems, fictional stories, poems, student art and autographs.

=== India ===
India does not have a long history of publishing school yearbooks. However, top business schools and engineering colleges publish custom yearbooks. The final-year students of the batch typically create this. A yearbook or memory book would include testimonials and common pages such as the director's address and events, and festival picture collages.

Most top schools create school magazines that are shared with each student.

=== Nigeria ===
In Nigeria, it is very common to find yearbooks in schools, as it is in countries such as the US and Canada, though several schools allocate annual funding and publish yearbooks at the end of the school year (July or August). These yearbooks closely resemble those found in the US, with columns on specific themes, in-depth coverage of major events, large photo collections, and drawings reflecting daily life at these schools. Some schools do produce yearbooks yearly.

=== South Africa ===
In South Africa, it is not as common to find yearbooks in schools, though several schools allocate annual funding and publish yearbooks at the end of the school year (November or December). These yearbooks provide in-depth coverage of major events, large photo collections, and drawings reflecting daily life at these schools.

Major events covered include Matric Farewell Dances, annual sporting events (such as Inter-schools, where several schools assemble and compete in various sports as well as with dance routines in competition for spirit awards, etc.), and grade group events organized specifically for a specific grade.

=== United States ===
Elementary and middle schools may have a designated staff member responsible for putting together that school's yearbook, with or without student help. These books are usually considerably smaller and often paperbound than a later secondary school / high school or college/university yearbook.

High school yearbooks generally cover a wide variety of topics, from academics, student life, sports, clubs, and other major school events. Generally, each student is pictured with their class. At the same time, seniors might receive a page-width photo, or one slightly larger than that of first-year students, to reflect their status in the school. Each school organization, such as a sports team or academic/social club, is usually pictured. A high school yearbook staff consists of students with one or more faculty advisors. The yearbook staff can be chosen in a variety of ways, including through a volunteer extracurricular organization, an academic class, or by being assigned to the entire senior class.

High school yearbooks are considered a form of journalism by scholastic journalism organizations such as the Columbia Scholastic Press Association, the National Scholastic Press Association, and the Journalism Education Association, among others. Numerous levels of awards are given based on judging competitions for journalistic excellence annually, often at the nationwide or state / regional press conventions/conferences and seminars for school/college media.

Colleges that publish yearbooks follow a similar format to high schools. Some include detailed recaps of football and basketball games. College yearbooks are considered by the Associated Collegiate Press (ACP) to be a form of journalism. ACP hosts the annual Pacemaker competition for college yearbooks and other collegiate media outlets. Many colleges have phased out yearbooks due to high prices and low demand, while some, like Auburn University, opt to support annual publications with relatively small portions of student fees to continue this over 120-year-old tradition. The Glomerata continues to be one of the most circulated yearbooks in the country, distributing 8,000 copies to Auburn University's student body in April 2018.

==== U.S. military ====
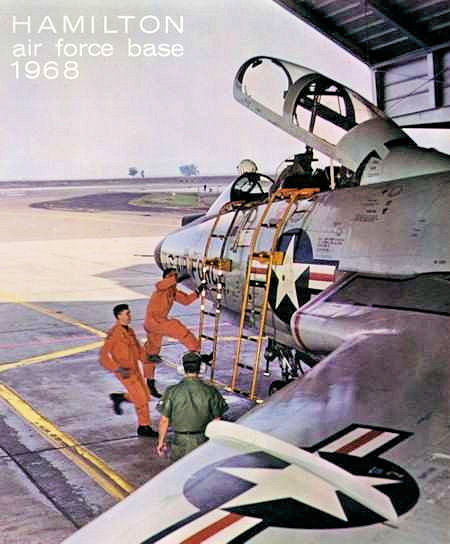
1968 military yearbook

Warships of the United States Navy often produce a yearbook-style publication upon completion of a long deployment (typically six months or more). These books, referred to by sailors as "cruise books" are produced on board by the ship's Morale, Welfare, and Recreation Department and Public Affairs staff, and then printed ashore by the same printing companies that publish high school and college yearbooks. The cruise book of a Nimitz-class aircraft carrier typically reaches over 600 pages in length, as it includes portraits of the more than 5,000 sailors and Marines assigned to the ship's company and embarked carrier air wing.

The Navy's Recruit Training Center in Great Lakes, Illinois also produces yearbook-style publications for each graduating division of recruits. These publications are much smaller, as each recruit division totals roughly 80 sailors. The book is called "The Keel," after the part of a ship built first, as RTC or boot camp lays the foundation for a sailor's career. These books include a color section common to all books published that year, with a separate black-and-white section added for each recruit division and its "brother" or "sister" division.

== Production and distribution ==
=== Compilation ===
Yearbooks are generally compiled by a student club or a yearbook class, usually under the guidance of a faculty member. The yearbook staff usually has one or more editors who are responsible for collecting and compiling all the information to be included in the book, as well as for deciding the layout and allocating space for each contributor.

==== Sections ====
Most yearbooks have a similar format, including individual student photographs and information on activities, sports, and other events.

===== People (seniors, first- and second-year students, faculty) =====
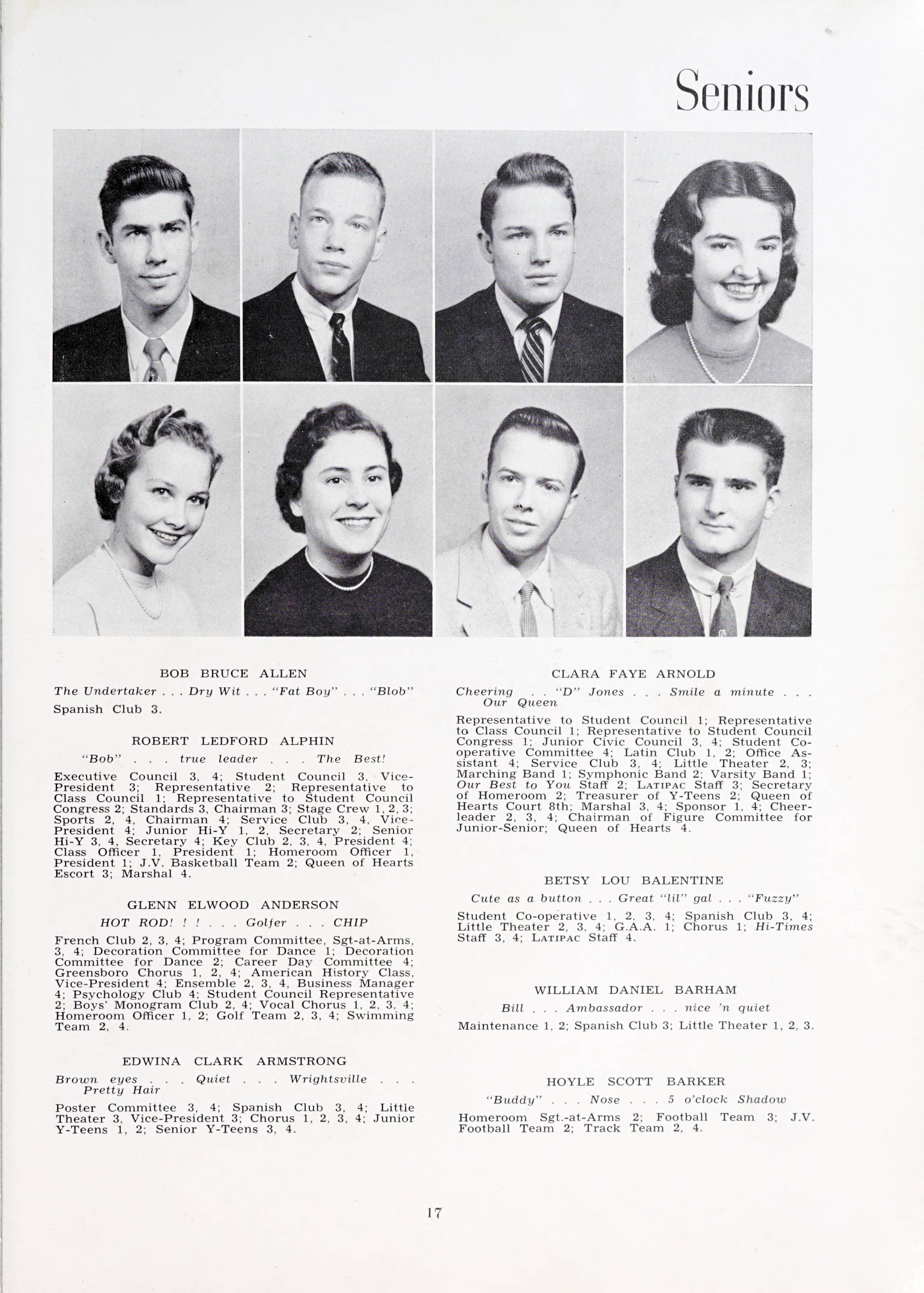
A seniors page from the 1955 yearbook for Needham B. Broughton High School in Raleigh, N.C.

In the U.S., where a yearbook often covers the whole school rather than just the senior class, these sections are usually arranged in chronological order by class (freshmen, sophomores, juniors, and seniors), either in ascending or descending order. Normally, students will have individual portraits accompanied by their names. Senior photographs are usually larger than those of first- and second-year students and are sometimes accompanied by text about their accomplishments throughout high school and their plans. Frequently, seniors are polled to nominate their classmates for "superlatives" or "class celebrities" (such as "most likely to succeed", "most athletic", "most spirited", "best smile", and "class clown"), which are often published in the senior section. In addition, seniors typically wear formal attire, and individuals select quotes that they feel represent themselves. Some private schools and smaller high schools set aside an entire page for each senior. These pages are sometimes designed by the seniors themselves, with each senior submitting a digital or physical version of the page they would like featured in the book.

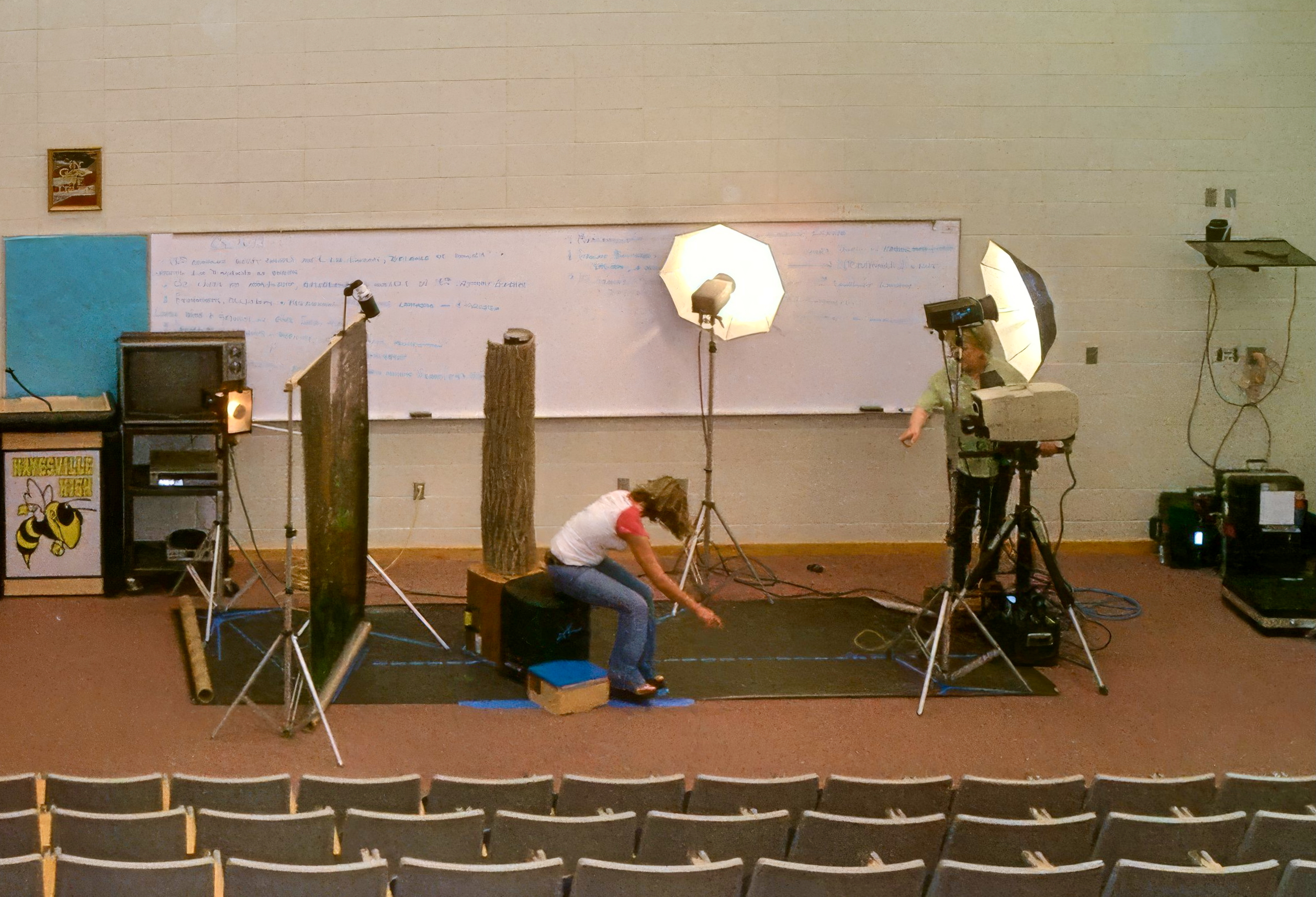
Picture day at Hayesville High School in North Carolina in 2004

"Picture Day" is the school day in the United States and Canada when students have their photographs taken by a professional photographer. Parents can purchase packages of these portraits to distribute, often accompanied by other items featuring the portraits. The pictures are not inexpensive for the time and effort involved, which can be less than one minute per student, partly because the photography company usually pays the school a portion of the price for each photo sold through a "rebate" or unadvertised "fundraising" scheme. These portraits often go into the school yearbook, which is usually distributed at the end of the school year. The pictures may also be used on student ID cards. There will also generally be a second day ("retake day") to take pictures if the student is absent.

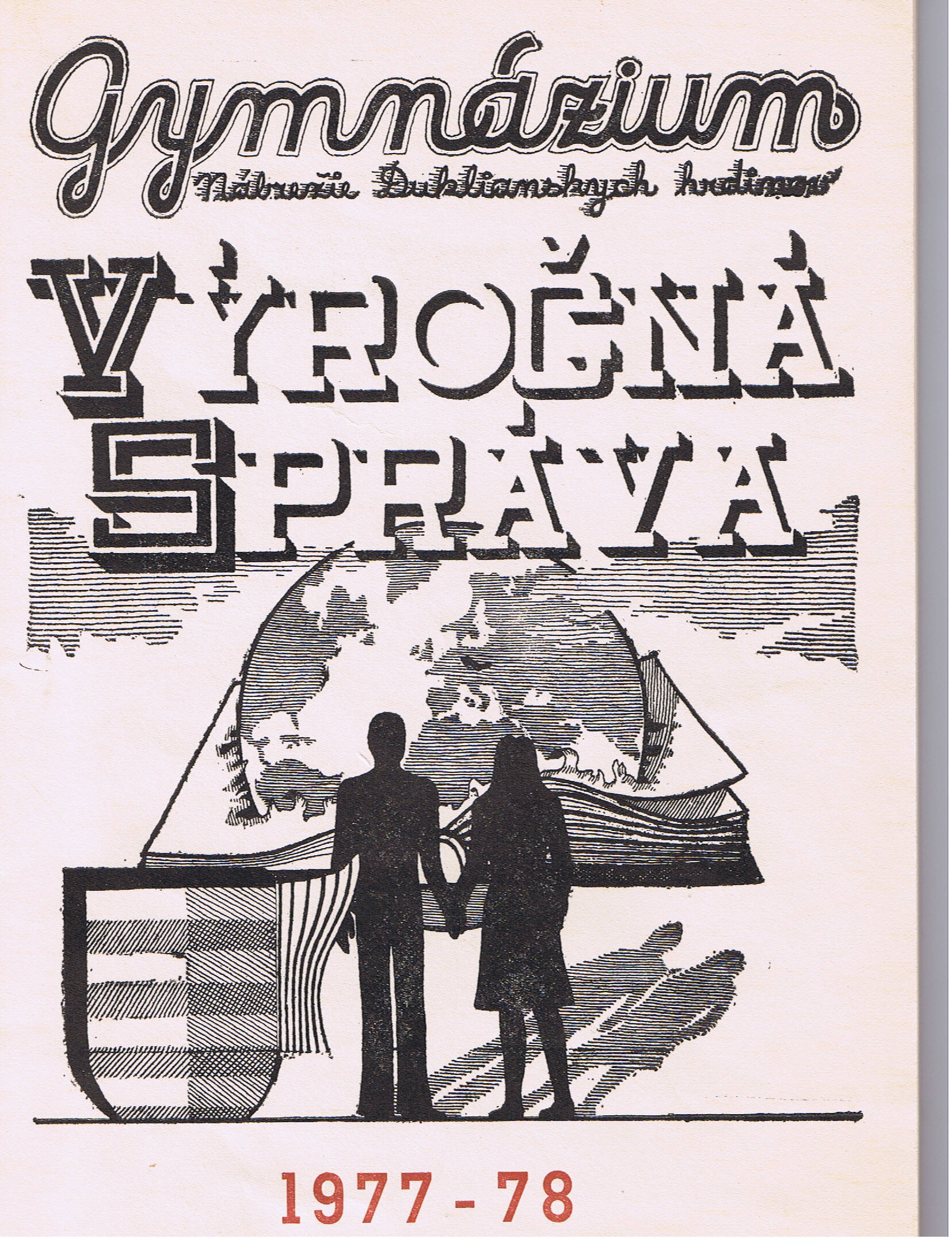
Slovak yearbook from the 1977–78 academic year

In the UK and other countries, where yearbooks often cover only the final year group and not the entire school, each student may have more space for answers to various questions, as well as their photo (or photos). In Year 11 (England & Wales), members are usually grouped by form/class; in Year 13, however, they are not grouped by form/class and instead appear alphabetically throughout the book. It is common in these markets for each person to have between a quarter and a full page, depending on the yearbook's budget (as more pages mean a higher cost). The editorial team chooses questions for members to answer (such as "Favourite teacher?" or "Where will you be in 5 years?") and these answers appear alongside member photos. These photos and answers are sometimes collected online as well.

===== Student life =====
Several pages are often used to chronicle students' activities, such as trips abroad, field trips, sports, and other special events. This part of the book often covers students' lives both on and off campus.

Sometimes members of a yearbook write editorial and journalistic content about life as a student, current events (local, national, and international), and other matters of interest to the peer group.

===== Academics/education =====
This section covers the classes, projects, and more educational aspects of the school year.

===== Organizations =====
This section describes student organizations (sometimes referred to as clubs) and what they did during the year. Photos of the organization's members often accompany these descriptions. This section sometimes includes a list of the members of each organization.

===== Sports =====
Often listed by season or club, these pages chronicle the accomplishments of the school's teams. Along with a short article listing the season's highlights, these pages include team photographs and action pictures.

===== Advertising pages =====
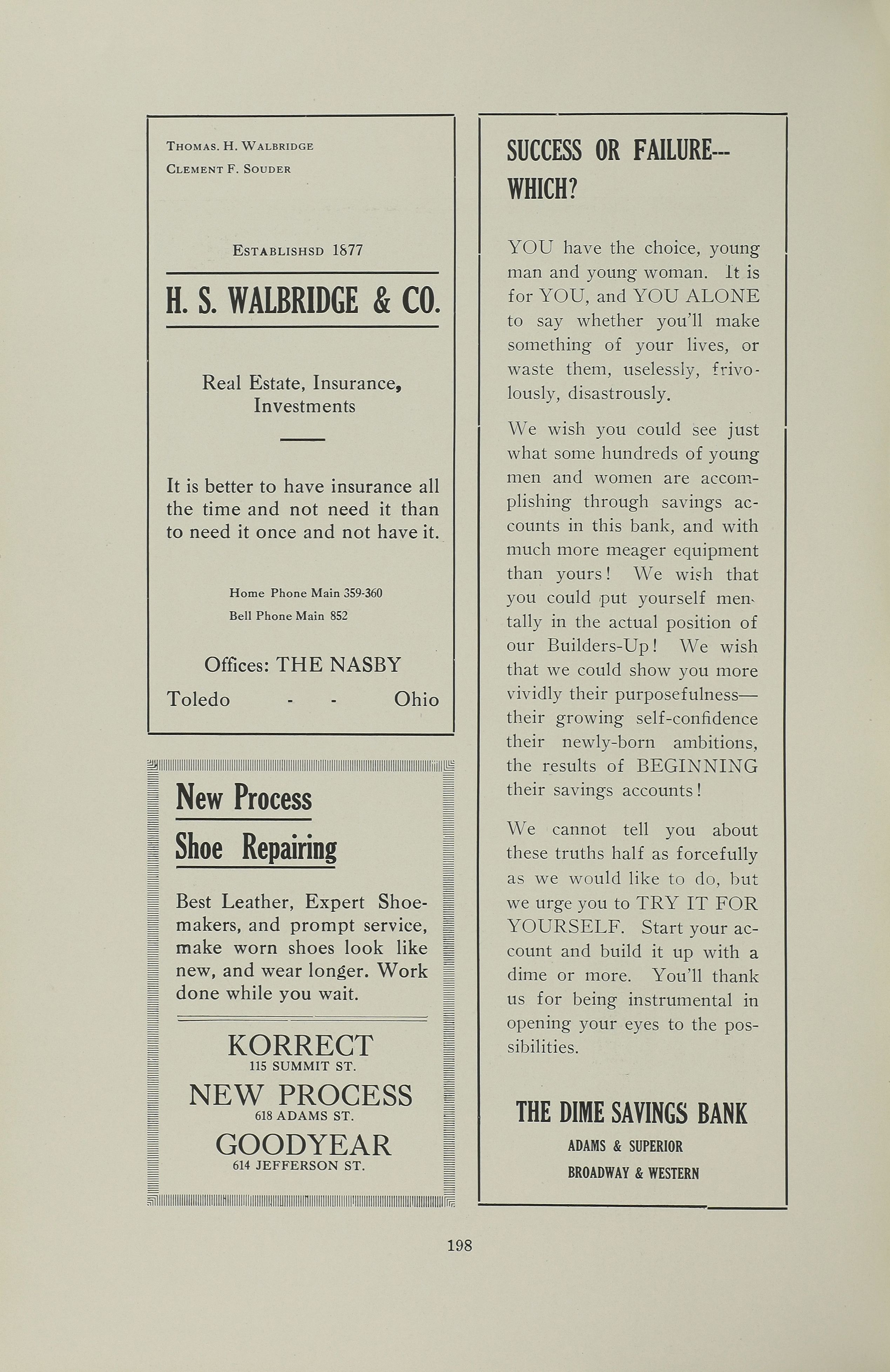
Advertisements in the 1914 "Almanac," the yearbook of Toledo Central High School in Toledo, Ohio

Many yearbooks gain revenue by including a section of ads from local businesses.

Some schools sell advertisements for seniors. Parents, other family members, and friends use these ads to congratulate a senior or a group of seniors for their accomplishments.

===== Index =====
Bigger yearbooks tend to include an alphabetical listing of everyone included in the yearbook, along with a listing of the pages they may be found on.

===== Colophon =====
Usually, near the end of the book, the colophon lists staff members and acknowledgments. The colophon includes technical information about the yearbook, such as the publisher, total number of pages, paper weight, and copyright.

===== Signature or autograph page =====
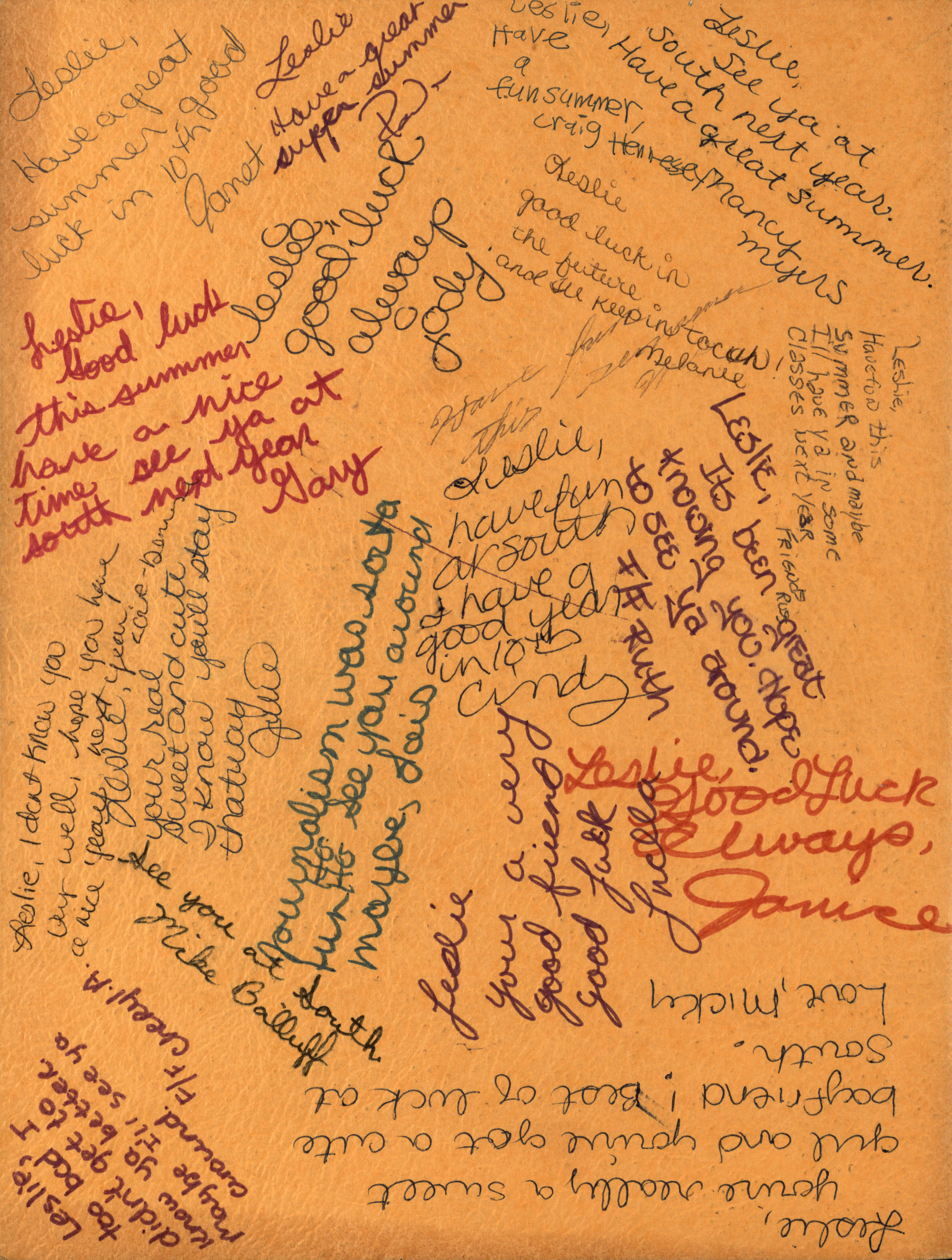
Some examples of the types of inscriptions and signatures which may be found in a typical yearbook

Some yearbooks include a few pages left blank for people to write messages about the previous year and summer. This tradition was inherited from commonplace books.

=== Design ===
Students may design yearbook pages themselves or use company-provided templates in most cases.

In general, most yearbook pages are designed as double-page spreads and include several items:

- Headline: An abbreviated sentence highlighting the content of the spread, usually involving wordplay along with factual information
- Story/Copy: Staff usually write short stories capturing the highlights of a specific department, sports season, organization, etc., from the past year. Often, yearbook staff members will interview students, teachers, and others for comments. Alternative story formats have gained popularity in recent years, allowing stories to be told visually (graphs, charts, polls, timelines, etc.).
- Photographs: Every spread that isn't a portrait or an ad spread contains candid shots of students, suitable to the page's topic and theme. Included with the photographs are one or more captions, which describe each picture; these often begin with "a".

In the past, most yearbooks were laid out by hand, with photographs physically cropped and placed on layout boards. The work was tedious and required multiple deadlines and contact with a yearbook publisher. Today, virtually all yearbooks are published using computers, which allows for shorter deadlines and easier editing. Students typically design pages using a desktop publishing program, usually Adobe InDesign. Some schools use a proprietary web-based design program belonging to the company that prints the book.

=== Publication ===
==== U.S. printing companies ====
Yearbook printing companies usually have representatives who work with the adviser and staff at each school to help create the yearbook.

Yearbook companies that use offset printing require that groups of pages be sent periodically, rather than all at once, to the plant. This is done to stagger the work required to complete yearbooks for all the schools they cover. After the editors review each page and make changes, the pages are sent to the yearbook plant, usually via the Internet. Yearbook companies that use digital printing methods may require only one submission, since the entire book is printed at once.

If the proofing process is not performed online, the adviser and editors receive proofs (typically full-size prints) about a week or so after the submission of pages. This gives the school a final opportunity to make adjustments. After all the proofs have been returned to the printing company, the requested corrections are made, and the books are printed, bound, and then sent to the school for distribution. Two examples of printing companies include Balfour and Jostens.

Several educational institutions and yearbook printing companies operate camps and summer sessions where student yearbook personnel can learn or polish the skills they need for their work.

=== Distribution ===
Often, yearbooks are distributed at the end of a school year so students, teachers, and other members of the school can obtain the books and signatures/personal messages from classmates. In the U.S., those who distribute at this time may publish a supplemental insert with photographs from spring sports and milestone events (such as prom and graduation) and other important events. Many schools where yearbooks are distributed at or before the end of the school year have a tradition of having students sign and leave notes in each other's yearbooks.

Some schools distribute yearbooks after the end of the school year—such as in July, at homecoming (US) in October, or at another designated time to include year-end activities. In some cases, yearbooks are mailed to the homes of graduating seniors' parents.

=== Digital yearbooks ===
A digital yearbook may contain text, embedded images, audio, and video. While a traditional paper yearbook may contain 300+ pages, a digital yearbook can contain unlimited pages. The greatly reduced price of digital yearbooks allows students to afford both a print yearbook and a digital yearbook that—barring platform decay—will be accessible anywhere, anytime, and can be updated and interacted with for life.

The end product of a digital yearbook can be a CD-ROM, a DVD, or an eBook. The first CD-ROM yearbook was created by students at South Eugene High School in 1990. Writing for Digital Imaging Reporter in 2018, Jerry Grossman, credits Forever Connected with creating the first widely adopted interactive, mobile yearbook in 2014. Traditional yearbook publishers originally sold it as an add-on to print purchases, allowing students to sign, sticker, and send videos to classmates right from their mobile devices.

== See also ==
- Annual Cyclopedia
- Columbia Scholastic Press Association
- National Scholastic Press Association
- Periodical
- Serial
- List of U.S. collegiate yearbooks
