= New American Cyclopædia =

Encyclopedia created and published by D. Appleton & Company

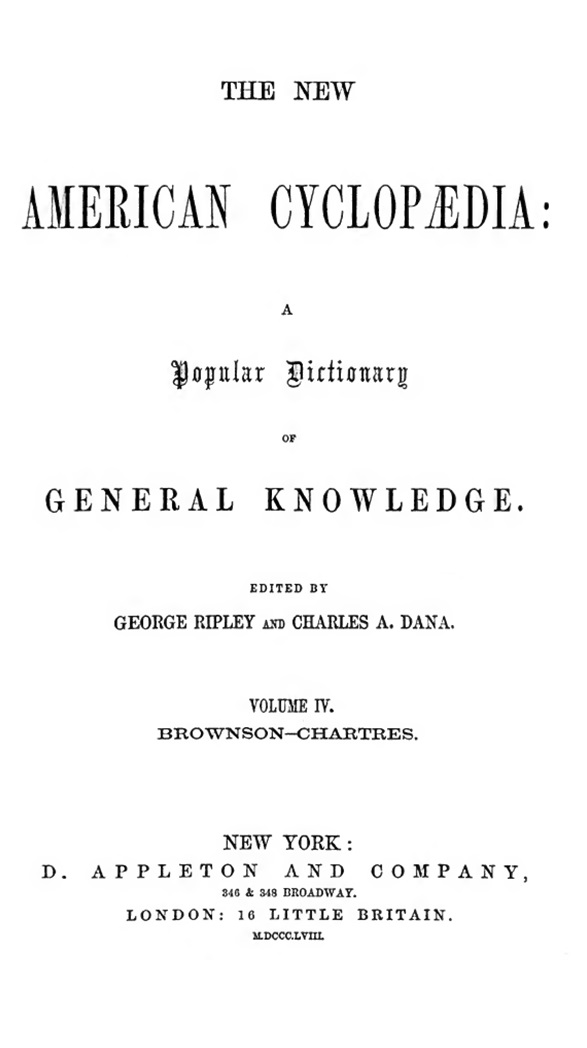
Title page from the New American Cyclopædia (1858)

The New American Cyclopædia was an encyclopedia created and published by D. Appleton & Company of New York in 16 volumes, which initially appeared between 1858 and 1863. Its primary editors were George Ripley and Charles Anderson Dana.

The New American Cyclopædia was revised and republished as the American Cyclopædia in 1873.

== Overview ==
The New American Cyclopædia was a general encyclopedia with a special focus on subjects related to the United States. As it was created over the years spanning the American Civil War, the focus and tone of articles could change drastically during its production; for example, Jefferson Davis, the future president of the Confederate States of America, was treated at length as a United States Army soldier and US government politician in pre-war editions.

As was traditional, the entire set was re-issued with the publication in 1863 of the 16th volume. The whole Cyclopædia was again re-issued in 1864.

== Contributors ==
A notable contributor was Karl Marx, then a European correspondent for the New York Tribune, who, appeared as the writer, while most of those articles were written by Friedrich Engels, especially the articles on military affairs, which belonged in Engels' domain in the division of labor between the two friends. Because of his deep knowledge of all things military, Engels had earned the nickname "General". Marx wrote a highly unsympathetic biographical article on Simon Bolivar.

Other prominent contributors to the first edition included

- Charles Allen
- Samuel G. Arnold
- Alexander Dallas Bache
- William Bross
- George Bancroft
- Benjamin Fordyce Barker
- John R. Bartlett
- Gunning S. Bedford
- Jeremiah S. Black
- George S. Blake
- Lorin Blodget
- Edmund Blunt
- Dion Boucicault
- Orestes Brownson
- B. Gratz Brown
- Rev. George Bush
- Charles P. Daly
- Charles Anderson Dana
- James D. Dana
- Richard Henry Dana Jr.
- Charles H. Davis
- Adolph Douai
- John William Draper
- Lyman C. Draper
- Ralph Waldo Emerson
- Edward Everett
- Horace Greeley
- George Washington Greene
- Joseph Henry
- Henry W. Herbert
- Rev. Thomas Hill
- Oliver Wendell Holmes Sr.
- James Russell Lowell
- Charles Nordhoff
- Henry Steel Olcott
- Frederick Law Olmsted
- Theophilus Parsons
- Rafael Pombo
- Hermann Raster
- William H. Seward
- Charles Sprague
- Henry B. Stanton
- Miss Rose Terry
- Rev. Thomas Thayer
- Alexander Thayer
- William Sydney Thayer
- John Reuben Thompson
- Richard Grant White
- Sidney Willard
- E. L. Youmans

== Publication history ==
The collection was published in 16 volumes between 1858 and 1863. It was revised and republished as the American Cyclopædia in 1873.

An associated yearbook, Appletons' Annual cyclopaedia and register of important events of the year, was published from 1861 to 1875 and on to 1902.

The cyclopaedia was revived under the title American Cyclopædia in 1873–6. A final edition was issued in 1883–4, which added supplements to each volume of the 1873 edition. Two analytical indexes were published separately in 1878 and 1884.

== See also ==
- Lists of encyclopedias

The American Cyclopædia, 1879
Volume	From	To
Volume 1	A	Asher
Volume 2	Ashes	Bol
Volume 3	Bolan Pass	Carmine
Volume 4	Carmona	Coddington
Volume 5	Code	Demotica
Volume 6	Dempster	Everett
Volume 7	Evesham	Glascock
Volume 8	Glasgow	Hortense
Volume 9	Hortensius	Kingslake
Volume 10	Kinglet	Magnet
Volume 11	Magnetism	Motril
Volume 12	Mott	Pales
Volume 13	Palestine	Printing
Volume 14	Prior	Shoe
Volume 15	Shomer	Trollope
Volume 16	Trombone	Zymosis
