= Alfred Van Santvoord =

American businessman (1819–1901)

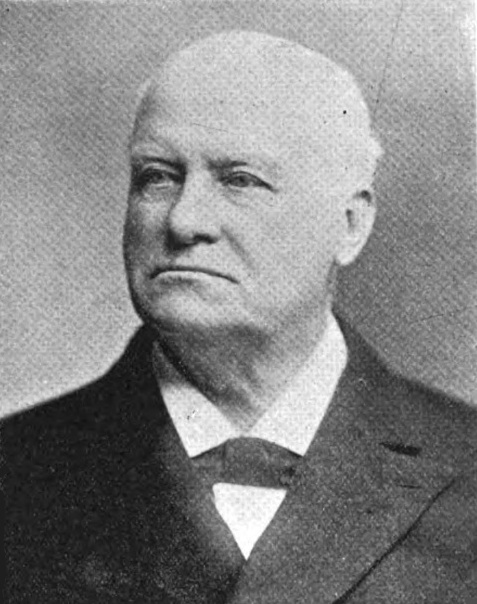
- Alfred Van Santvoord
- Born: January 23, 1819; Utica, New York, U.S.
- Died: July 20, 1901 (aged 82); New York City, New York, U.S.
- Spouse: Anna Margaret Townsend (m. 1852; died 1890)
- Children: 5
- Parent(s): Abraham Cornelius Van Santvoord; Sarah Hitchcock
- Relatives: Van Santvoord Merle-Smith (grandson); Eben Erskine Olcott (son-in-law)

Alfred Van Santvoord (January 23, 1819 – July 20, 1901) was a wealthy American businessman who made his fortune running steamboat lines.

== Early life ==
Alfred was born in Utica, New York on January 23, 1819. He was the son of Sarah (née Hitchcock) Van Santvoord (1786–1878) and Abraham Cornelius Van Santvoord (1784–1858), who had provided munitions during the War of 1812 to the troops of Captain Thomas Macdonough on Lake Champlain, and thus played a major role in the American victory at the Battle of Plattsburgh. After the war, Abram Van Santvoord became one of the first boatmen on the Erie Canal. His brother was Cornelius Van Santvoord.

His father moved the family to Rochester, New York in 1821, and later to Albany, New York, then to Jersey City, New Jersey.

== Career ==
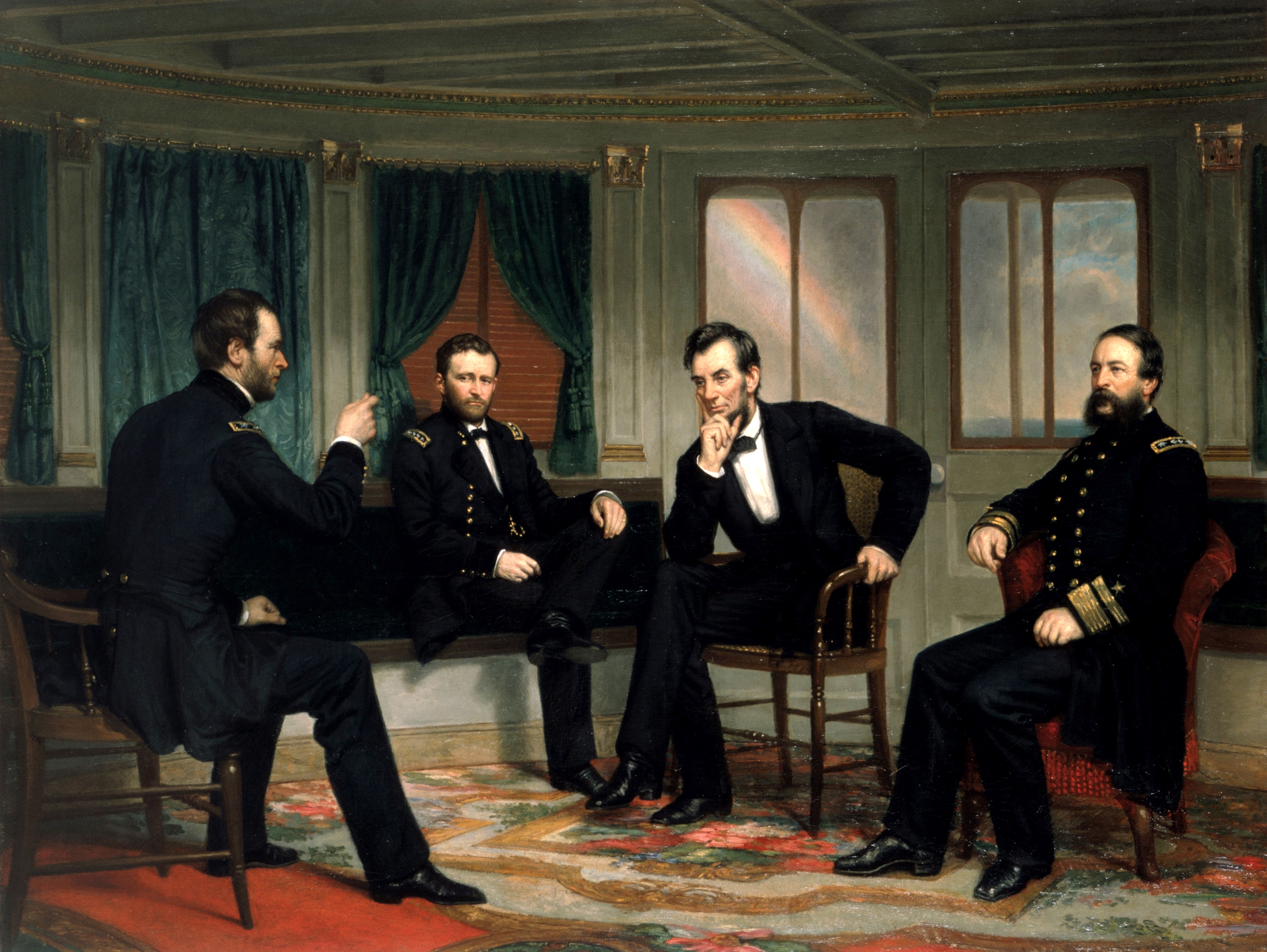
The Peacemakers (1868) by George Peter Alexander Healy depicts William Tecumseh Sherman, Ulysses S. Grant, Abraham Lincoln, and David Dixon Porter on board the River Queen, a steamboat owned by Alfred Van Santvoord.

Following a common school education in Albany, Alfred Van Santvoord became a clerk for his father, and later obtained an interest in his father's business. Together, the Van Santvoords ran boats on the Erie Canal and the Hudson River. His father also had a joint interest with Daniel Drew and Isaac Newton in the People's Line, which ran passenger boat service on the Hudson River.

After his father's death, Van Santvoord purchased a number of steamboats and launched the Albany Day Line, which also offered transportation to passengers. Van Santvoord also came to own several freight-towing boats, which eventually became the Hudson River Day Line.

During the American Civil War, Van Santvoord chartered several of his boats to the Union. One of Van Santvoord's boats, the River Queen served as Major General Benjamin Franklin Butler's headquarters. The River Queen served as the site of the Hampton Roads Conference in 1865. President of the United States Abraham Lincoln traveled on the River Queen often during the Civil War.

Although he never sought political office, after the Civil War, Van Santvoord was influential with Thurlow Weed. He was well known in business circles, and was a friend of William Henry Vanderbilt. Van Santvoord was one of the organizers of the Lincoln National Bank and the Lincoln Safe Deposit Company. He was a director of the Delaware and Hudson Railway, the Albany and Susquehanna Railroad, the Catskill Mountain Railroad, the Chicago, Milwaukee & St. Paul Railway, and the United New Jersey Railroad and Canal Company. Upon his death, his son-in-law Eben Olcott became president of The Day Line.

== Personal life ==
On January 22, 1852, Van Santvoord was married to the former Anna Margaret Townsend (1826–1890) of Albany. She was the daughter of Absalom Townsend and Elizabeth (née Lansing) Townsend, and the granddaughter of Jacob Lansing and Anna (née Quackenbush) Lansing. Together, they were the parents of five children, four of whom survived to adulthood, including:

- Elizabeth Van Santvoord (1853–1854), who died young.
- Charles Townsend Van Santvoord (1854–1895), a manager of the Hudson River Day Line who did not marry.
- Katharine Lawrence Van Santvoord (1855–1934), who married Eben Erskine Olcott (1854–1929), a president of the American Institute of Mining Engineers.
- Zaidee Van Santvoord (1858–1943), who Rev. Wilton Merle Smith (1856–1923), D.D., pastor of Central Presbyterian Church in New York City.
- Anna Townsend Van Santvoord (1861–1919).

Van Santvoord died aboard his yacht, Clermont, on July 20, 1901. He was buried at Albany Rural Cemetery in Menands, New York.

=== Descendants ===
Through his daughter, he was the paternal grandfather of Van Santvoord Merle-Smith (1889–1943), a Princeton and Harvard Law graduate who served as the Third Assistant Secretary of State under U.S. President Woodrow Wilson.
