= Daniel G. Rollins =

American politician (1842–1897)

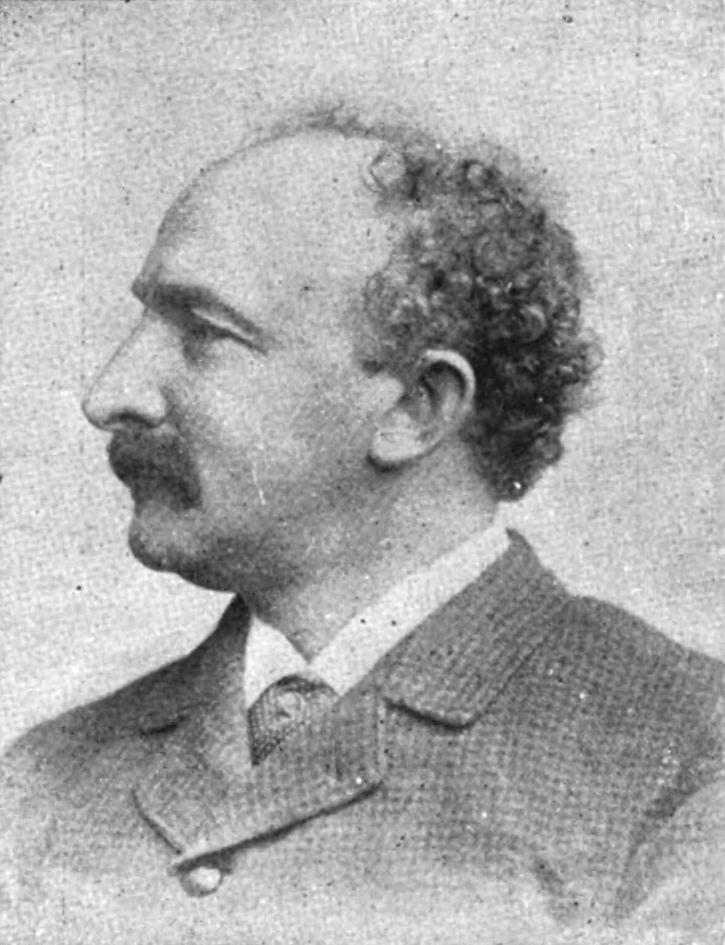

New York County District Attorney
- In office 1881–1881
- Appointed by: Alonzo B. Cornell
- Preceded by: Benjamin K. Phelps
- Succeeded by: John McKeon

Daniel Gustavus Rollins (October 18, 1842 – August 30, 1897) was an American lawyer and politician from New York.

== Life ==
He was the son of Daniel G. Rollins, Judge of Probate of Strafford Co. 1857-66, and Susan Binney (Jackson) Rollins. He graduated from Dartmouth College in 1860. Then he studied law at Harvard Law School, was admitted to the bar, and commenced practice in Portland, Maine.

From 1866 to 1869, he was an Assistant United States Attorney for the Southern District of New York and removed to New York City. Afterwards he resumed his private practice.

In 1873, his former fellow Asst. U.S. Attorney Benjamin K. Phelps took office as New York County District Attorney and appointed Rollins an Assistant D.A.

On December 31, 1879, Rollins was the Republican candidate for Recorder of New York City, to fill the vacancy caused by the death of John K. Hackett, but the Board of Supervisors elected Tammany man Frederick Smyth. In November 1880, Rollins ran on the Republican and the German Independent tickets for Recorder of New York, but was again defeated by the incumbent Recorder Smyth.

On January 10, 1881, Rollins was appointed by Gov. Alonzo B. Cornell as D.A. of New York to fill the vacancy caused by the death of D.A. Phelps, and remained in office until the end of 1881. In November 1881, Rollins declined to run to succeed himself as D.A., and was instead elected Surrogate of New York County. He was re-elected in 1884, and remained in office until the end of 1887.

In 1884, Dartmouth College conferred an honorary degree of LL.D. on him. In November 1887, he ran for the New York Supreme Court (1st D.) but was defeated. Afterwards he resumed his private practice. One of his last cases was the defense of the owners of the American Tobacco Company who were charged with "conspiracy and violation of the Penal Code", meaning that they had formed a monopoly.

Rollins died from diabetes at the place of his birth which he used then as his summer home, on Beacon Street in Somersworth, N.H. (previously named Great Falls), and was buried in that city.

His brother Edward Ashton Rollins was Speaker of the New Hampshire House of Representatives in 1861 and 1862. Congressman Edward H. Rollins was a distant cousin, all descended from Judge Ichabod Rollins (1722–1800).

== Sources ==
- Life of Edward H. Rollins: A Political Biography by James Otis Lyford (page 120)
- Sketches of the Alumni of Dartmouth College by George Thomas Chapman (page 453)
- MR. SMYTH THE RECORDER in NYT on January 1, 1880
- THE STATE AND LOCAL NOMINATIONS in NYT on October 31, 1880
- MR. PHELPS'S SUCCESSOR in NYT on January 11, 1881
- THE REPUBLICAN TICKET in NYT on October 27, 1881
- DANIEL G. ROLLINS in NYT on November 3, 1887
- AMERICAN TOBACCO COMPANY.; Trial of Its Officers for Conspiracy and Violation of the Penal Code to Begin To-day in NYT on June 8, 1897
- DANIEL G. ROLLINS DEAD in NYT on August 31, 1897

Legal offices
Preceded by Benjamin K. Phelps	New York County District Attorney; 1881	Succeeded by John McKeon
