= J. Van Vechten Olcott =

American politician (1856–1940)

Jacob Van Vechten Olcott
- Born: May 17, 1856; New York City
- Died: June 1, 1940 (aged 84)
- Education: Thirteenth Street School, College of the City of New York, Columbia Law School
- Known for: Member of the Civil Service Commission of New York City, trustee and vice president of St. Luke's Hospital
- Office: Member of the U.S. House of Representatives
- Political party: Republican
- Relatives: New York County D. A. William M. K. Olcott and mining engineer Eben Erskine Olcott (brothers)

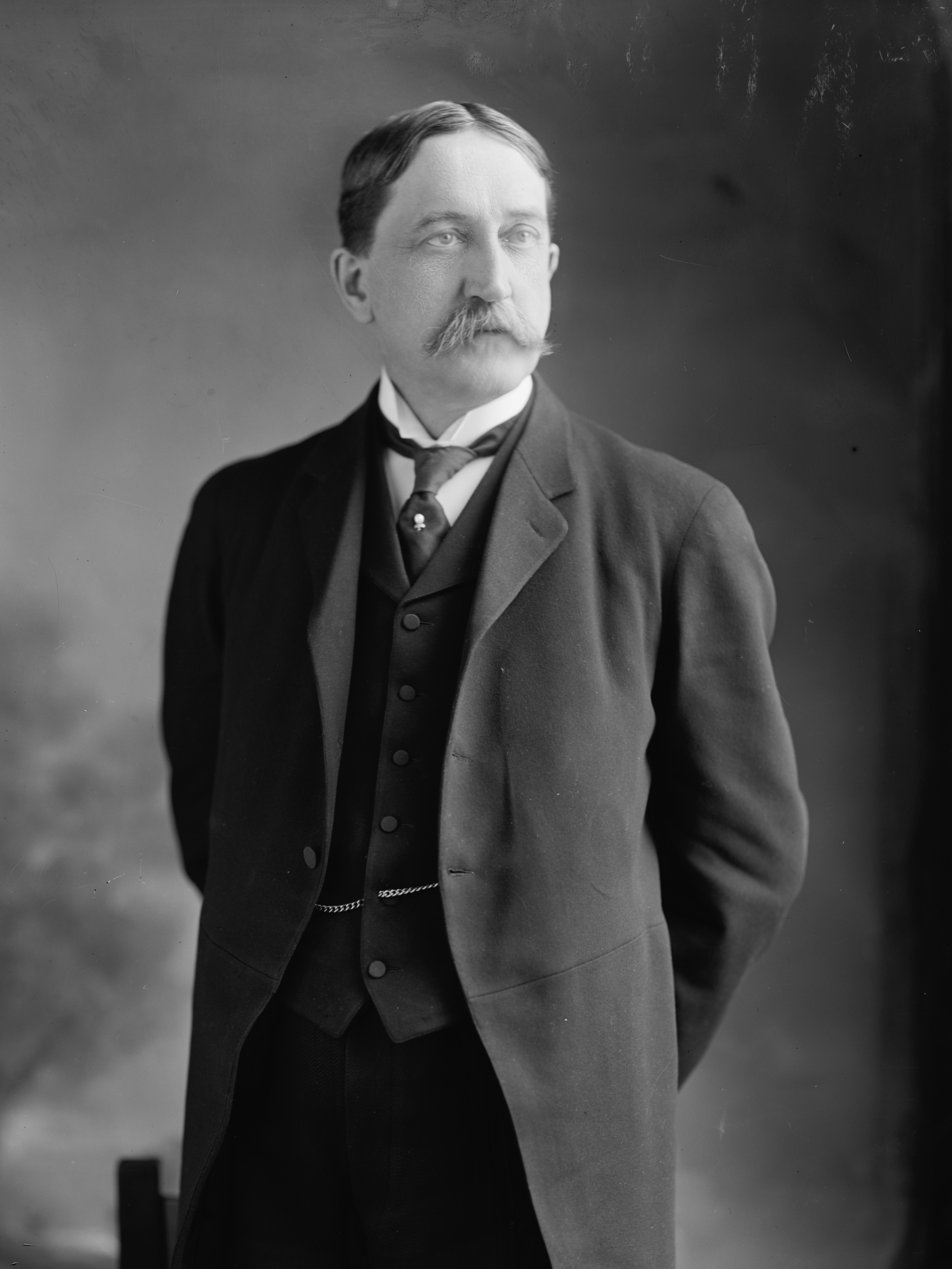
J. Van Vechten Olcott, New York Congressman

Jacob Van Vechten Olcott (May 17, 1856 – June 1, 1940) was a U.S. representative from New York.

Born in New York City, Olcott attended public schools, including the Thirteenth Street School. He also attended the College of the City of New York. He was graduated from the Columbia Law School at New York City in May 1877.

He was admitted to the bar on May 17, 1877, and commenced the practice of law in New York City in 1881. He served as member of the Civil Service Commission of New York City in 1895–1897. He was a trustee and vice president of St. Luke's Hospital, New York City.

Olcott was elected as a Republican to the Fifty-ninth, Sixtieth, and Sixty-first Congresses (March 4, 1905 – March 3, 1911). He was not a candidate for renomination in 1910. He was one of 14 representatives, all Republicans, to oppose the Sixteenth Amendment to the United States Constitution, which imposed a federal income tax.

He continued the practice of law in New York City until his death on June 1, 1940. He was interred in Green-Wood Cemetery, Brooklyn, New York.

New York County D. A. William M. K. Olcott and mining engineer Eben Erskine Olcott were his brothers.

== Sources ==
- United States Congress. "J. Van Vechten Olcott (id: O000059)". Biographical Directory of the United States Congress.

U.S. House of Representatives
Preceded by William H. Douglas	Member of the U.S. House of Representatives from New York's 15th congressional district 1905–1911	Succeeded by Thomas G. Patten
