= John Vincent (lawyer) =

John Vincent was an American lawyer and politician from New York.

== Life ==
He lived in Harlem, and had a law office at 20, Nassau Street.

In January 1882, John McKeon took office as New York County District Attorney and appointed Vincent an Assistant D.A. After McKeon's death on November 22, 1883, Vincent was appointed by the Court of General Sessions as Acting D.A. pending the filling of the vacancy by the governor. On November 30, Governor Grover Cleveland appointed Wheeler H. Peckham as D.A. and Vincent resumed his post as Assistant D.A. After Peckham's resignation, D.A. Peter B. Olney retained Vincent as Assistant D.A. and both remained in office until the end of 1884. Afterwards Vincent resumed the practice of law.

In November 1887, Vincent ran on the United Labor ticket for the New York Supreme Court (1st D.) but was defeated.

Later he removed to Rockville Centre, New York. He was Vice President of the Bank of Rockville Centre. In 1898, he claimed to have been cured of rheumatism by the "Kneipp cure."

== Sources ==
- MR. M'KEON'S ASSISTANTS in NYT on December 29, 1881
- JOHN M'KEON'S WORK DONE in NYT on November 23, 1883
- THE NEW DISTRICT ATTORNEY.; MR. PECKHAM... in NYT on December 2, 1883
- ASSISTANT DISTRICT ATTORNEYS in NYT on December 28, 1883
- A COMPETENT TRUSTEE.; ...CONTEST ENDS IN MUCH LOSS AND DEFEAT OF MR. CALVIN'S SPECIAL GUARDIAN, JOHN VINCENT in NYT on February 3, 1887
- LABOR PARTY CANDIDATES in NYT on October 18, 1887
- A LIST OF THE CANDIDATES ON THE VARIOUS TICKETS in NYT on November 7, 1887
- COMPLETING THE CANVASS in NYT on November 22, 1887
- TAKING THE KNEIPP CURE in NYT on June 12, 1898

Legal offices
Preceded by John McKeon	New York County District Attorney; Acting; 1883	Succeeded by Wheeler H. Peckham
