= List of U.S. collegiate yearbooks =

Collegiate and university yearbooks, also called annuals, have been published by the student bodies or administration of most such schools in the United States. Because of rising costs and limited interest, many have been discontinued: From 1995 to 2013, the number of U.S. college yearbooks dropped from roughly 2,400 to 1,000. This is a partial list of those yearbooks that have been made available for digital search and download via their school libraries or archives.

State	University	Yearbook name	Publication date range	Digital archive	Notes
Alabama	University of Alabama	Corolla	1893–2014	Alabama Corolla yearbooks	
Alabama	Auburn University	Glomerata	1897–2019	Auburn Glomerata yearbooks	
California	California State Polytechnic University, Pomona	El Rodeo yearbook	1927–1980; 1990	Cal Poly Pomona El Rodeo yearbooks	(Note: No longer published.) (Note: Cal Poly, Pomona was the southern campus of Cal Poly, San Luis Obispo during its early decades. Some editions of the yearbook were published under that school's name.)
California	Holy Names University	HNU Year Book	1929–1979	Holy Names' yearbooks	
California	Pomona College	Metate	1894–2012	—N/a	(Note: Physical archive available via the Online Archive of California)
California	University of California, Berkeley	Blue & Gold	1875–present (2024)	Blue & Gold Yearbook	
Colorado	University of Northern Colorado	Cache la Poudre	1907–2001, a few missing	Northern Colorado's Cache la Poudre yearbooks	
Connecticut	University of Connecticut	The Nutmeg	1915–present (2024)	UConn Nutmeg yearbooks	
Connecticut	Wesleyan University	Olla Podridas	1867–2009	Wesleyan's yearbooks	
Florida	University of Florida	Tower Yearbook	1910–1973,1983–2008,2020–Present	University of Florida Tower yearbooks	
Florida	University of Miami	IBIS Yearbook	1926–present	University of Miami Ibis Yearbook	
Georgia	Georgia Tech	Blueprint	1908–2018, 2023–present (2024)	Georgia Tech's Blueprint yearbooks	
Georgia	University of Georgia	Pandora	1886- present	Georgia's Pandora yearbooks Alt site, Georgia's Pandora yearbooks	
Illinois	Northwestern University	Syllabus	1885–20xx ?	Northwestern Syllabus yearbooks	(Note: Not online?)
Illinois	University of Illinois	Illio	1895–20xx ?	Digital Archives The Illio yearbooks	
Indiana	Butler University	Drift (called Gallery, Senior Book, Carillon in early years)	1891–2013	Butler Drift yearbooks	
Indiana	Indiana University	Arbutus	1938–2002, sporadic availability	Indiana Arbutus yearbooks	
Indiana	Purdue University	Debris (called A Souvenir 1890)	1889–2007	Purdue Debris yearbooks	
Indiana	Trine University (formerly Tri-State)	Modulus (called Integral in 1922 and 1924)	1922–1988	Trine Modulus yearbooks	
Iowa	Drake University	Quax	1902–1994	Drake Quax yearbooks	(Note: The portal page notes Quax yearbooks prior to the 1931 Golden Jubilee edition can be a little confusing. The year in the title Does Not refer to the year the book was published, but to the junior class. So each of these books were published a year prior to the year in the title (ie: the 1924 Quax was published in 1923).)
Iowa	University of Iowa	Hawkeye	1892–1973, 1977–1992	Iowa Hawkeye yearbooks	
Iowa	Iowa State University	Bomb	1894–1995	Iowa State The Bomb yearbooks	
Kansas	Fort Hays State University	Reveille	1914–2003	Fort Hays State Reveille yearbooks	
Kansas	Kansas State University; Resource includes K-State Salina books	Royal Purple previously Bell Clapper & Sunrise	1891–2009	Kansas Royal Purple yearbooks	
Kansas	University of Kansas	Quivira (1893), Jayhawker (1918+)	1893–1982 (sporadic)	1893 Quivira yearbook (requires free sign-up); Kansas Jayhawker yearbooks (requires free sign-up)	
Louisiana	Tulane University	Jambalaya (1896–1996), T-Wave (1982–2010)	1896–2010 (sporadic thereafter)	Jambalaya yearbook	
Maine	University of Maine	Prism (1895–1997); Dirigamus (2004)	1895–1997, 2004	Prism Yearbooks	
Maine	University of Maine at Farmington	Effesseness; Effesteco; Dirigo	1922–2009	UMF Yearbooks (partial)	
Maine	University of Maine at Fort Kent	Acadian	19xx ?–19xx ?	One edition, 1973, found online.	
Maine	University of Maine at Machias	Washingtonia	1911–19xx ?	Four editions, mid-1970s, found online	
Maine	University of Maine at Presque Isle	Salmagundi	1909–19xx ?	One edition, from 1979, is available online.	
Maine	University of Southern Maine (Gorham Campus and preceding institutions)	Green and White (1919–1948); Hillcrest (1949–1971)	1919–1971	USM Yearbooks	(Note: No yearbook 1944.)
Maine	University of Southern Maine (Portland Campus and preceding institutions)	Puvian (1922–1925); Stag (1948–1957); Umpire (1958–1968, 1972); The Complete Annual (1969); The Log (1971)	1922–1925, 1948–1972	USM Yearbooks	
Maine	University of Southern Maine (UMPG, then both campuses)	Reflection (1973–1984); USM Yearbook (1994)	1973–1984, 1994	USM Yearbooks	
Maryland	University of Maryland	Reveille (1897–1934); The Frieze (Greek only) (1971-2000); Terrapin (1935–2022)	1897–20xx ?	Maryland Terrapin & Reveille yearbooks, The Frieze Greek organizations	
Massachusetts	Boston College	Sub Turri	1913–2009	Boston College Sub Turri yearbooks	
Massachusetts	University of Massachusetts Amherst	Index	1869–2005	UMass Index yearbooks	
Massachusetts	Massachusetts Institute of Technology	Technique	1885–1930, expansion ongoing	MIT Technique yearbooks	
Michigan	Eastern Michigan University	Aurora	1893–1995	Eastern Michigan Aurora yearbooks	(Note: Not available for 1897 (composite only).)
Michigan	University of Michigan	Michiganensian	1896–present (2024)	Michigan's Michiganensian yearbooks	
Michigan	Michigan State University	Red Cedar Log (named Wolverine 1900-1901 and 1910-1975, Glück-auf 1904-1905, Heliostat 1896, and Harrow 1887-1889)	1889–20xx ?	Michigan State Red Cedar Log yearbooks	(Note: Several gaps.)
Minnesota	Minnesota State University, Mankato	Katonian (several names)	1906–1981	Mankato State Katonian yearbooks	
Minnesota	University of Minnesota	Gopher	1888–1967, 1982–1983	Minnesota Gopher yearbooks	
Missouri	University of Missouri	Savitar	1895–2005	Missouri Savitar yearbooks	
Missouri	Washington University in St. Louis	Hatchet; Quadrangles	1903–2011	Washington University Hatchet yearbooks	
Montana	Montana State University	Montanan	1906-1991	Montana State University Montanan yearbooks	
Montana	University of Montana	The Sentinel	1904-1989	University of Montana Sentinel	
Nebraska	University of Nebraska–Lincoln	Sombrero (1884–1906); Cornhusker (1907–2004)	1884–2004	Nebraska Cornhusker yearbooks	
New Hampshire	University of New Hampshire	Granite (1909–2015)	1909–2015	New Hampshire Granite yearbooks	
New Jersey	Montclair State University	Palatine, La Campana	1909, 1919–2012	Montclair La Campana yearbooks, etc	
New Jersey	Rutgers University; Other coordinated campuses	Scarlet Letter, etc.	1871–1944, 1946–2005	Rutgers Scarlet Letter yearbooks Also see Special Collections	
New Jersey	Stevens Institute of Technology	The Eccentric (1874–1890) The Bolt (1883–1890) The Link (1890–present)	1874–present (2024)	Stevens The Stevens Yearbook Collection (1874–2000)	
New York	Cornell University	Cornellian	1871–2007, others?	Cornell Cornellian yearbooks	
New York	Fordham University	Maroon	1916–1948, expansion ongoing	Fordham Maroon yearbooks	(Note: The 1941 issue was called the Centurion)
New York	Union College	Garnet	1877–1968	Union College Garnet yearbooks	
North Carolina	All North Carolina colleges	(see link)		All North Carolina colleges yearbooks	
North Carolina	University of North Carolina at Chapel Hill	Yackety yack (named the Hellenian from 1890-1900)	1890–1992	North Carolina Yackety yack yearbooks	
Ohio	Bowling Green University	The Key	1918–2008	Bowling Green The Key yearbooks	(Note: No Key yearbooks issued in 1933 or 1935.)
Ohio	University of Cincinnati	Cincinnatian	1894–1972	University of Cincinnati Cincinnatian yearbooks	(Note: Not published in 1906, published sporadically since 1972.)
Ohio	Ohio University	Athena	1892–2019	Ohio University Athena yearbooks	(Note: The Athena is unavailable online between 1894-1907.)
Ohio	Ohio State University	Makio	1880–2021	Ohio State Makio yearbooks	(Note: The Makio was not published in 1881, 1893, 1979, nor from 1995-2000.)
Ohio	University of Toledo	The Blockhouse	1922–1985	University of Toledo The Blockhouse yearbooks	(Note: The Blockhouse was not produced between 1972 and 1979. The last issues were in 1981 and in 1985.)
Ohio	Wooster College	Index	1874–2021	Wooster College Index yearbooks	
Pennsylvania	Carnegie Mellon University	Thistle	1906–2016	Carnegie Mellon Thistle yearbooks	
Pennsylvania	Pennsylvania State University	La Vie	1890–2005	Penn State La Vie yearbooks	
Rhode Island	Brown University	Liber Brunensis	1880–2007	Brown University Liber Brunensis yearbooks	
Rhode Island	Pembroke College	Brun Mael	1909–1970	Pembroke College Brun Mael yearbooks	(Note: After 1970, see Brown University's yearbook.)
South Carolina	University of South Carolina	Garnet and Black	1899–1994	South Carolina Garnet and Black yearbooks	
South Carolina	University of South Carolina	Garnet and Black	1899–1994	South Carolina Garnet and Black yearbooks	
Tennessee	University of Tennessee	Volunteer; Evolve	1897–1917, 1919–2009	University of Tennessee Volunteer yearbooks	(Note: Not published in 1918)
Texas	Baylor University	The Roundup	1896–present (2024)	Baylor University The Roundup yearbooks	
Texas	Southwestern University	Sou'wester	1904–2002	Southwestern University Sou'wester yearbooks	(Note: Not published in 1918, 1919, or 1997-1999.)
Vermont	University of Vermont	Ariel, Folklore (2001–)	1886–1997, 2001–20xx ?	University of Vermont Ariel yearbooks	
Virginia	University of Virginia	Corks and Curls	1888–2018	University of Virginia Corks and Curls yearbooks	
Virginia	Virginia Tech	The Bugle	1895–present (2024)	Virginia Tech The Bugle yearbooks	(Note: The Bugle was not published in 1944 and 1945 because of low enrollment during World War II.)
Washington	University of Washington	Tyee	1900–1994	University of Washington Tyee yearbooks	
Washington	Washington State University	Chinook	1892–1992	Washington State Chinook yearbooks	
West Virginia	West Virginia University	Monticola	1896–1987, 1992 and 2000	West Virginia University Monticola yearbooks	
Wisconsin	Marquette University	Hilltop	1915–1996	Marquette Hilltop yearbooks	
Wisconsin	University of Wisconsin–Madison	Badger (named Trochos in 1885, 1886)	1885–2012	Wisconsin Badger yearbooks	
Wisconsin	University of Wisconsin–Milwaukee	The Ivy	1942–1968	UW Milwaukee Ivy yearbooks	(Note: Not published in 1960-61.)

== Other sources ==
The HathiTrust Digital Library provides many yearbook collections online if colleges and universities are member institutions. Some otherwise unavailable collegiate yearbooks are available via subscription service through Ancestry.com. Commercial services such as e-yearbook.com may also be a resource.

A 2021 resource, listing multiple collegiate and high school yearbooks by state is The Ancestor Hunt - there may be some duplication between this resource and those in the table above.
