= William M. K. Olcott =

American politician and lawyer (1862–1933)

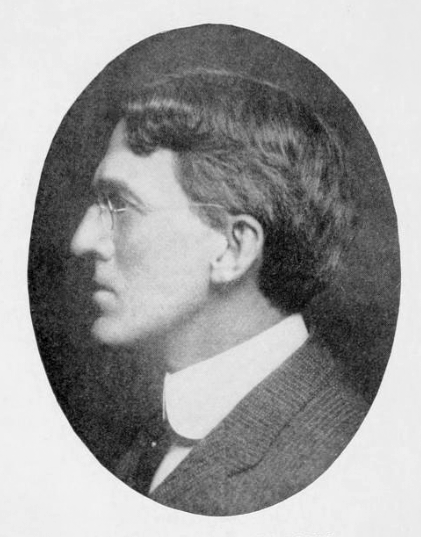

New York County District Attorney
- In office 1896–1897
- Preceded by: John R. Fellows
- Succeeded by: Asa Bird Gardiner

Personal details
- Born: William Morrow Knox Olcott; August 27, 1862 Manhattan, New York City, U.S.
- Died: May 10, 1933 (aged 70) Manhattan, New York City, U.S.
- Party: Republican
- Spouses: Jessica Augusta Baldwin (m. 1888; died 1930) Florence A. Corbett (m. 1931)
- Children: Nellson Olcott
- Parent(s): John N. Alcott; Euphemia Helen Knox
- Relatives: J. Van Vechten Olcott (brother); Eben Erskine Olcott (brother)
- Education: City College; Columbia Law School

William Morrow Knox Olcott (August 27, 1862 – May 10, 1933) was an American lawyer and politician from New York City.

== Early life ==
He was born on August 27, 1862, in New York City to John N. Olcott and Euphemia Helen Knox. Future Congressman J. Van Vechten Olcott and mining engineer Eben Erskine Olcott were his brothers.

He graduated from City College in 1881, and from Columbia Law School in 1883.

== Career ==
He practiced law and entered politics as a Republican.

In November 1893, he ran for judge of the New York City Court, but was defeated. He was a member of the Board of Aldermen from January 1895 until his appointment as New York County District Attorney

He was appointed New York County District Attorney in December 1896 to fill the vacancy caused by the death of John R. Fellows. In November 1897, he ran on the Republican ticket to succeed himself, but was defeated by Democrat Asa Bird Gardiner.

In December 1897, Olcott was appointed by Governor Frank S. Black, a judge of the New York City Court, to fill the vacancy caused by the resignation of Robert Anderson Van Wyck who had been elected Mayor. He left the bench at the end of 1898, and resumed his private practice as a partner of Ex-Governor Black in the firm of Black, Olcott, Gruber & Bonynge.

He was a delegate to the 1904 Republican National Convention and to the New York State Constitutional Convention of 1915.

== Personal life ==
On December 6, 1888, he married Jessica Augusta Baldwin, and their son was Nellson Olcott, who became an Assistant District Attorney under Edward Swann and Joab H. Banton.

In January 1930, his first wife died aboard the steamer Rome on the return voyage from Italy. In June 1931, he married Florence A. Cobbett (died 1951).

Olcott died at his home in Manhattan on May 10, 1933.

Legal offices
Preceded by John R. Fellows	New York County District Attorney; 1896–1897	Succeeded by Asa Bird Gardiner
