= Annual Cyclopaedia =

Yearbook published by D. Appleton & Company

The Annual Cyclopedia was an American yearbook covering the years 1861–1902 by the New York publisher D. Appleton & Company. It was a comprehensive yearbook of events, obituaries and statistics, worldwide, with many articles written by experts, some of them signed.

It was sold as an annual supplement to the New American Cyclopedia in 16 volumes, edited by George Ripley and Charles Anderson Dana, 1857–1863. When that encyclopedia was enlarged as American Cyclopedia (1873–1876), the Cyclopedia started a new series.

Sets are held in major libraries, and some volumes are online.

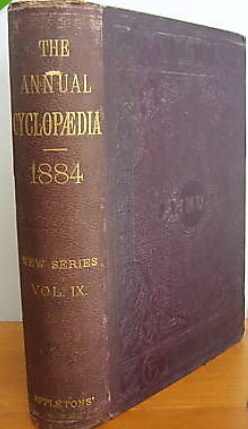

It appeared under several titles:

- The American annual cyclopedia and register of important events. Embracing political, civil, military, and social affairs: public documents; biography, statistics, commerce, finance, literature, science, agriculture, and mechanical industry. (1862–75)
- Appletons' annual cyclopedia and register of important events embracing political military, and ecclesiastical affairs; public documents; biography, statistics, commerce, finance, literature, science, agriculture, and mechanical industry : a general and analytical index to the American cyclopaedia.
- The Annual Cyclopedia
- Appleton's Annual Cyclopedia
- Appleton's American Annual Cyclopedia
- American annual cyclopedia and register of important events (1876-1903)
- American Annual Cyclopedia

Appleton also published a six volume biographical compendium, many of whose articles are linked in Wikipedia: James Grant Wilson, and John Fiske, eds. Appletons' Cyclopædia of American Biography (D. Appleton and company, 1887) online vol 2

The editors included fake biographies to spot copyright violators, but no such accusation was made against the Annual Cyclopedia.

== Online copies ==
Year	available online	
1861	Appleton's Annual Cyclopaedia and Register of Important Events: 1861	
1862	Appleton's Annual Cyclopaedia and Register of Important Events: 1862	
1863	1863	
1864	1864	
1865	1865	
1866	1866	
1867	Appleton's Annual Cyclopaedia and Register of Important Events: 1867	
1868	1868	
1869	Appleton's Annual Cyclopaedia and Register of Important Events: 1869	
1870	Appleton's Annual Cyclopaedia and Register of Important Events: 1870	cannot be read online
1871	1871	
1872	1872	
1873	Appleton's Annual Cyclopaedia and Register of Important Events: 1873	
1874	The American Annual Cyclopaedia and Register of Important Events: 1874	
1875	1875	
1876	Appleton's Annual Cyclopaedia and Register of Important Events of the Year: 1876	
1877	1877	
1878		
1879		
1880	1880	
1881	Appleton's Annual Cyclopaedia and Register of Important Events of the Year: 1881	
1882	Appleton's Annual Cyclopaedia and Register of Important Events of the Year: 1882	
1883		
1884	Appleton's Annual Cyclopaedia and Register of Important Events of the Year: 1884	
1885		
1886		
1887	Appleton's Annual Cyclopaedia and Register of Important Events of the Year: 1887	
1888	Appleton's Annual Cyclopaedia and Register of Important Events of the Year: 1888	
1889	1889	
1890		
1891		
1892		
1893	Appleton's Annual Cyclopaedia and Register of Important Events of the Year: 1893	
1894		
1895	Appleton's Annual Cyclopaedia and Register of Important Events of the Year: 1895	
1896	Appleton's Annual Cyclopaedia and Register of Important Events of the Year: 1896	
1897		
1898	1898	
1899	Appleton's Annual Cyclopaedia and Register of Important Events of the Year: 1899	cannot be read online
1900	1900	
1901	Appletons' Annual Cyclopedia and Register of Important Events: Embracing Political, Military, and Ecclesiastical Affairs; Public Documents; Biography, Statistics, Commerce, Finance, Literature, Science, Agriculture, and Mechanical Industry: 1901	cannot be read online
1902	Appletons' Annual Cyclopedia and Register of Important Events: 1902	
