= Wheeler Hazard Peckham =

American judge (1833–1905)

Wheeler Peckham
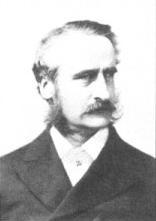

District Attorney of New York County
- In office November 30, 1883 – December 9, 1883
- Governor: Grover Cleveland
- Preceded by: John Vincent (Acting)
- Succeeded by: Peter Olney

Personal details
- Born: January 1, 1833 Albany, New York, U.S.
- Died: September 27, 1905 (aged 72) New York City, New York, U.S.
- Party: Democratic
- Education: Union College; Albany Law School (LLB)

Wheeler Hazard Peckham (January 1, 1833 – September 27, 1905) was an American lawyer from New York and an unsuccessful nominee to the Supreme Court of the United States.

== Early life ==
Peckham was born in Albany, New York, on New Year's Day, 1833 to Rufus Wheeler Peckham and Isabella Adoline; his mother died when he was 15. He was educated at The Albany Academy and at his father's alma mater, Union College, where he joined Kappa Alpha Society before leaving early due to poor health. Peckham studied law at his father's partnership with Lyman Tremain and was also among the first students to attend Albany Law School. Peckham then left New York to practice in the northwestern United States, where he became what the New York Times called "one of the best known attorneys in that part of the country."

== Legal practice ==
Poor health caused him to return to New York City in 1867, where he established the firm of Miller & Peckham and gained fame first as a constitutional lawyer, and later as a special prosecutor for the State. He was involved in the unsuccessful prosecution of Mayor A. Oakey Hall in 1872, and also prosecuted former Tammany Hall leader "Boss" Tweed with Tremain in 1873. Peckham again represented the State against Tweed in 1876, when he won a $6 million verdict in a civil fraud suit.

Championed by his brother and businessman Daniel Manning, Peckham was appointed by Governor Grover Cleveland as New York County District Attorney on November 30, 1883, to fill the vacancy caused by the death of John McKeon, despite pressure from a barrage of applicants. However, Peckham tendered his resignation a mere eight days after taking the oath of office, citing ill health. He then returned to private practice in the Wall Street offices of Miller, Peckham & Dixon, where he focused primarily on civil practice. Peckham also served as the President of the New York City Bar Association from 1892 to 1894.

== Nomination to U.S. Supreme Court ==
In 1894, Cleveland, who was then in his nonconsecutive second term as President, nominated Peckham to replace Samuel Blatchford on the U.S. Supreme Court. However, the nomination was caught in the middle of a political tug-of-war between Cleveland and New York Senator David B. Hill, and Wheeler became the second nominee of Cleveland that Hill managed to block, by a vote of 32-41 on February 16, 1894. Senator Edward Douglass White was instead confirmed to the Court. By the time another seat on the Court was vacant after the death of Howell E. Jackson in 1895, Hill had been weakened politically, and Cleveland turned to Wheeler's brother, Rufus, who was confirmed within six days.

== Social role ==
Peckham was one of the most famed New York City lawyers of his time, and an active participant in New York City politics and society. He presided over social events as a member and president of the City Club, and he advocated for reform of "municipal degradation:"

The issue is simply one of men. You cannot remedy matters by law nor by system, you have got to remedy it by the simple expedient of turning out the maladministrators and putting in their places men who are honest and capable. We must organize a power that will overcome present conditions and put in office men who are capable and aggressively so. Vice, that has awakened such an outburst of public opinion, is but one of the things that must go.

== Family ==
His father, Rufus Wheeler Peckham, was also a lawyer, and a New York Court of Appeals judge and congressman. His brother, also named Rufus Wheeler Peckham, was also a New York lawyer, state court judge, and U.S. Supreme Court Justice.

== Legacy ==
Peckham is buried in the Peckham family plot at Albany Rural Cemetery, along with his wife, Annie Aertsen Keasbey (1826, Salem, New Jersey – October 30, 1916), whom he married in 1855. His father, who was lost at sea, also has a cenotaph there.

== Sources ==
- The History Box: Brief Sketches on Important Men of New York City
- Trial of William M. Tweed from Celebrated Trials by Henry Lauren Clinton, 1897.
- Many of the family names and dates were found at the Peckham family plot at Albany Rural Cemetery, Section 11, Lot 19.

Legal offices
Preceded by John Vincent; Acting	District Attorney of New York County; 1883	Succeeded by Peter Olney
