= Randolph B. Martine =

American judge

New York County District Attorney
- In office 1885–1887
- Appointed by: William Russell Grace
- Preceded by: Peter B. Olney
- Succeeded by: John R. Fellows

Personal details
- Born: Randolph Brant Martine; 1844 New York City
- Died: March 30, 1895 (aged 50–51) New York City
- Party: County Democracy
- Children: Randolph Brant Martine Jr.
- Parent: Theodore Martine
- Education: Columbia College; Columbia Law School

Randolph Brant Martine (1844 – March 30, 1895) was an American lawyer and politician from New York.

== Early life ==
Martine was born in 1844 in the Sixteenth Ward of New York near 22nd Street and Eighth Avenue. He was the son of Theodore Martine, a grocer and realtor descended from French Huguenot immigrants. In 1900, his niece, Mary Martine Carew, was shot by an ex-convict after Mrs. Carew rebuffed his advances.

He graduated Columbia College in 1865, and from Columbia Law School in 1866.

== Career ==
After his graduation from law school, he was admitted to the bar and practiced law with the firm, Flanagan, Bright & Martine, which dissolved not long thereafter, at which point he practiced on his own for several years before partnering with Charles A. Jackson under the name Jackson & Martine (with offices in the Morse Building).

Martine was a member of Tammany Hall but left in 1881, following the expulsion of Fire Commissioner Henry D. Purroy and Police Justice Andrew J. White, and joined the Anti-Tammany Democrats in New York City, first known as the "Purroy Democracy" then as the "County Democracy." In 1882, Mayor William R. Grace sent his appointment as a New York City Police Commissioner to the Board of Aldermen, but having a Tammany majority, the Board refused to vote upon the issue, and the office remained vacant.

In November 1884, Martine was elected on the County Democracy ticket New York County District Attorney. On taking office, he appointed John R. Fellows and De Lancey Nicoll as Assistant D.A.s, and Vernon M. Davis as Deputy Assistant District Attorneys. Martine prosecuted Jacob Sharp and several Aldermen for bribery in connection with the concession for the Broadway Surface Railroad. In April 1886, he ordered to be arrested all the Ex-Aldermen who had in 1884 voted for the railroad concession, seven of whom were eventually convicted.

In November 1887, he was elected on the Tammany, County Democracy, Republican and Irving Hall (another faction of Anti-Tammany Democrats) tickets a judge of the Court of General Sessions, and remained in office until his death.

== Personal life ==
With his wife, Lucretia A., he one son, Randolph Brant Martine Jr. (b. 1869), was appointed Deputy Assistant D.A. by De Lancey Nicoll in April 1893.

He died from "heart failure due to peritonitis" at his home at 2017 Fifth Avenue in New York City.

Legal offices
Preceded by Peter B. Olney	New York County District Attorney; 1885 - 1887	Succeeded by John R. Fellows
