= Benjamin K. Phelps =

American politician and lawyer (1832–1880)

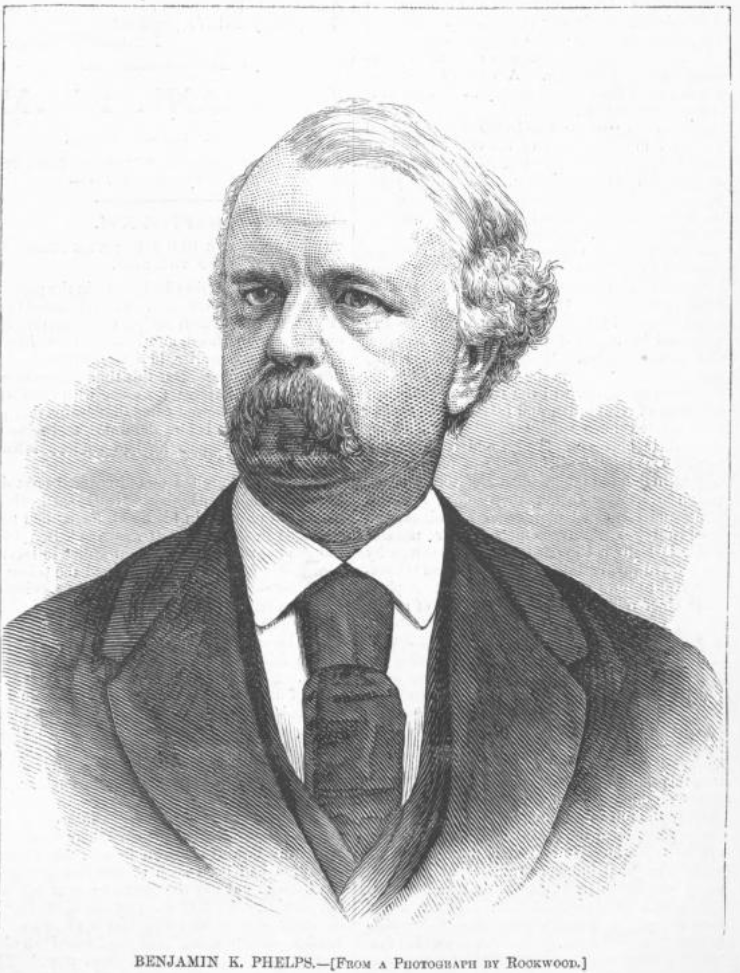

New York County District Attorney
- In office 1873–1880
- Preceded by: Samuel B. Garvin
- Succeeded by: Daniel G. Rollins

Personal details
- Born: Benjamin Kinsman Phelps; September 16, 1832 Haverhill, Massachusetts, U.S.
- Died: December 30, 1880 (aged 48) New York City, New York, U.S.
- Party: Republican
- Spouse: Hannah Maria Catlin (m. 1857; died 1880)
- Children: 3
- Education: Andover Theological Seminary
- Alma mater: Yale College

Benjamin Kinsman Phelps (September 16, 1832 – December 30, 1880 in New York City) was an American lawyer and district attorney in New York.

== Early life ==
Phelps was born in Haverhill, Essex County, Massachusetts on September 16, 1832. He was the only child of the Rev. Dudley Phelps (1797–1849), a Congregational clergyman, and Ann (née Kinsman) Phelps (1808–1834).

He attended Andover Theological Seminary, and graduated from Yale College in 1853.

== Career ==
After graduation from Yale, he studied law in Hillsborough County, New Hampshire and Westchester County, New York, and was admitted to the bar in 1855 in Poughkeepsie, New York. In 1856, he moved to New York City and practiced law there in partnership with his Yale classmate Sherman W. Knevals.

From 1866 to 1870, Phelps was an Assistant United States Attorney for the Southern District of New York. In 1869, he was sent to North Carolina to take charge of the proceedings against the officers of the USS Hornet, charged with a violation of the Neutrality laws.

In 1872, he formed a new law firm "Arthur, Phelps, Knevals & Ransom" with Chester A. Arthur, his old partner Knevals, and Rastus S. Ransom, who served as Surrogate of New York from 1887 to 1893.

In November 1872, Phelps was elected on the Republican ticket New York County District Attorney, and remained in office until his death, being re-elected in 1875 and 1878.

In 1875, Carlotta Frances Shotwell testified before the Assembly Committee on Crime in New York City about the legal abuses in her 1874 trial. It came out in these proceedings that District Attorney Phelps was tied to the Tammany Hall political machine under which many prominent defendants were not pursued vigorously by the District Attorney.

== Personal life ==
In October 1857, Phelps married Hannah Maria Catlin (1831–1880), a daughter of Mary (née Fisher) Catlin and Lt. Gov. Julius Catlin, and they had three children, including:

- Mary Cutler Phelps (b. 1858)
- Dudley Farley Phelps (1861–1952), an attorney who married Margaret G. Burnet.
- Anna Kinsman Phelps (b. 1865), who married William Hutchinson Merrill (1860–1913) in 1901.

In October 1880, Phelps became ill, and never fully recovered. His wife died on December 21, and Phelps himself died nine days later of "internal hemorrhage" at his residence at 101 West 47th Street. Phelps was buried at Woodlawn Cemetery (Bronx, New York).

Legal offices
Preceded by Samuel B. Garvin	New York County District Attorney; 1873–1880	Succeeded by Daniel G. Rollins
