= Peter B. Olney =

American lawyer and politician (1843–1922)

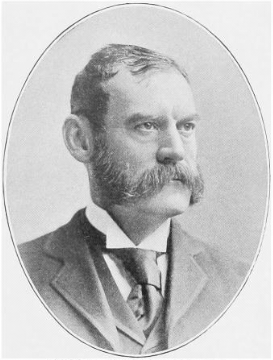
- Born: Peter Butler Olney; July 23, 1843; Oxford, Massachusetts, US
- Died: February 9, 1922 (aged 78); Cedarhurst, New York, US
- Education: Harvard University; Harvard Law School
- Occupations: Lawyer, politician
- Political party: Democratic
- Spouse: Mary Sigourney Butler

Peter Butler Olney (July 23, 1843 – February 9, 1922) was an American lawyer and politician from New York. He worked in private practice in New York City and was also the New York County District Attorney and a Referee in Bankruptcy.

== Early life ==
Olney was born in Oxford, Massachusetts on July 23, 1843. He attended Phillips Andover Academy. He graduated from Harvard College in 1864, and from Harvard Law School in 1866.

== Career ==
Olney was admitted to the bar and commenced practice in the firm of Evarts, Southmayd & Choate in New York City. In 1869, he formed a partnership with Ex-Secretary of State of New York Francis C. Barlow. In 1872, Barlow took office as State Attorney General and Olney helped with the prosecution of the members of the Tweed Ring.

In 1875, Olney ran on the Tammany ticket for New York County District Attorney but was defeated by the incumbent Republican Benjamin K. Phelps. Afterwards Olney left Tammany and joined the "County Democracy", the Anti-Tammany Democrats of New York City. After the death of D.A. John McKeon and the resignation of Wheeler H. Peckham after only a week in office, Governor Grover Cleveland appointed Olney in December 1883 as D.A. to fill the vacancy until the end of 1884.

In 1884, Olney decided to act against Marm Mandelbaum, a criminal fence to many of the street gangs and criminals of New York's underworld. Instead of relying on the city's police force, which Mandelbaum had reportedly been bribing for decades, Olney hired the Pinkerton Detective Agency, to conduct a sting operation that led to her arrest. The use of Pinkerton detectives caused some friction between the district attorney's office and the city's police inspector.

From 1897 until his death, he practiced law as senior partner of the firm of Olney & Comstock. From 1898 on he was also a Referee in Bankruptcy. In 1919, he was appointed by Surrogate Fowler as referee to investigate claims against the estate of the deceased actress Anna Held.

== Personal life ==
Olney married Mary Sigourney Butler, and they had four sons: Peter B. Olney, Jr. (1881–1968), Richard Olney, Wilson Olney and Sigourney B. Olney.

Olney died from pneumonia at his home at Cedarhurst, Long Island. He was a trustee of Teachers College. U.S. Attorney General and Secretary of State Richard Olney was his brother.

Legal offices
Preceded by Wheeler H. Peckham	New York County District Attorney; 1883–1884	Succeeded by Randolph B. Martine
