= Van Santvoord Merle-Smith =

American government official (1889–1943)

Third Assistant Secretary of State
- In office June 24, 1920 – March 4, 1921
- President: Woodrow Wilson
- Preceded by: Breckinridge Long
- Succeeded by: Robert Woods Bliss

Personal details
- Born: June 22, 1889 Oyster Bay, New York, U.S.
- Died: November 9, 1943 (aged 54) New York City, New York, U.S.
- Spouse: Kate Grosvenor Fowler (m. 1916)
- Children: 4
- Parent(s): Wilton Merle Smith; Zaidee Van Santvoord
- Relatives: Alfred Van Santvoord (grandfather)
- Education: Princeton University; Harvard Law School

Van Santvoord Merle-Smith (June 22, 1889 – November 9, 1943) was a United States soldier, lawyer, and investment banker, who served as Third Assistant Secretary of State from 1920 to 1921, and as Executive Intelligence Officer to General Douglas MacArthur during World War II.

== Early life ==
Van Santvoord Merle-Smith was born in Oyster Bay, New York in 1889. He was the son of Zaidee Van Santvoord (1858–1943) and Rev. Wilton Merle Smith (1856–1923), D.D., pastor of Central Presbyterian Church in New York City, a congregation of the Presbyterian Church in the United States of America. His mother was the daughter of Alfred Van Santvoord. His older sister was Dorothy (née Merle-Smith) Pyle (1887–1982) and his younger sister was Anita (née Merle-Smith) Knight (1891–1971).

He was educated at Princeton University, graduating in 1911, and at Harvard Law School, graduating in 1914.

== Career ==
During World War I, Merle-Smith served in the United States Army's 165th Infantry Regiment, 42nd Division, achieving the rank of captain. Captain Merle-Smith was awarded the Distinguished Service Cross for his actions on July 28, 1918, with the medal's citation reading as follows:

The President of the United States of America, authorized by Act of Congress, July 9, 1918, takes pleasure in presenting the Distinguished Service Cross to Captain (Infantry) Van Santvoord Merle-Smith, United States Army, for extraordinary heroism in action while serving with 165th Infantry Regiment, 42d Division, A.E.F., near Villers-sur-Fere, France, on 28 July 1918. Captain Merle-Smith was in command of a company at the crossing of the River Ourcq. Despite the loss of all the other officers in his company, and although wounded himself, he continued to direct his men effectively against the enemy. When his major was killed he succeeded to the command of the battalion and led it forward throughout the day with courage and gallantry.

Merle-Smith had attained the rank of major by the time he left the army.

After the war, Merle-Smith served as Third Assistant Secretary of State from June 24, 1920, to March 4, 1921, during the administration of President of the United States Woodrow Wilson.

After leaving the United States Department of State, Merle-Smith joined the New York City law firm of Pratt & McAlpin. He later became an investment banker with Roosevelt & Son. Like his grandfather Alfred Van Santvoord, Merle-Smith developed a passion for yachting, and was a prominent member of the Seawanhaka Corinthian Yacht Club.

Merle-Smith returned to the army with the outbreak of World War II, achieving the rank of colonel. He became Executive Intelligence Officer for General Douglas MacArthur. In 1943, Colonel Merle-Smith suffered a mental breakdown brought on by heavy staff work in the South Pacific.

== Personal life ==
On June 20, 1916, Merle-Smith married Kate Grosvenor Fowler (1888–1982). She was the daughter of Kate Grosvenor and Eldridge M. Fowler, and the granddaughter of Col. W. M. Grosvenor. The couple would eventually have four children:

- Van Santvoord Merle-Smith Jr. (1917–2003), who was the chaplain of the Moravian Seminary in Bethlehem, Pennsylvania.
- Nancy Merle-Smith (1921–1991), who married to Robert C. Stover in 1948.
- Fowler Merle-Smith (1926–1998), who was an administrator and teacher at the Buckley School in New York City and later at Princeton Day School.
- Margaret Merle-Smith (1929–1965), who married William St. Clair Childs (1928–1965), in December 1964. They died shortly thereafter in a plane crash in February 1965.

Three months after his breakdown, Merle-Smith died in Cove Neck, New York, on November 9, 1943. His funeral was attended by more than 400 people.

Government offices
Preceded by Breckinridge Long	Third Assistant Secretary of State; June 24, 1920 – March 4, 1921	Succeeded by Robert Woods Bliss
