= Manhattan District Attorney =

Elected district attorney for New York County

District Attorney of New York County

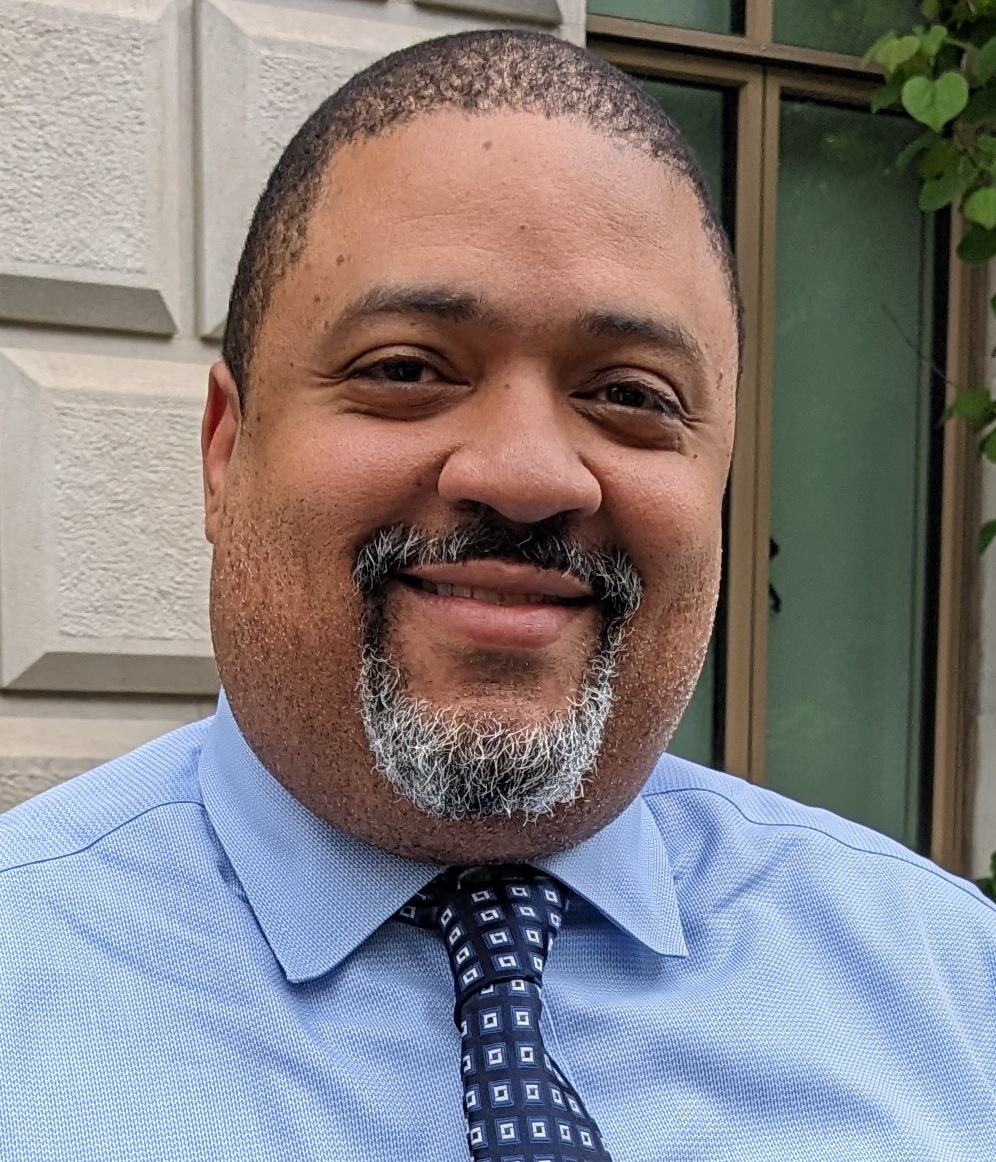
- Incumbent; Alvin Bragg Jr. since January 1, 2022
- District Attorney’s Office of New York County
- Formation: 1801
- First holder: Richard Riker
- Deputy: Chief Assistant District Attorney, Margaret “Meg“ Reiss; First Assistant District Attorney, Gloria Garcia
- Website: ManhattanDA.org

The District Attorney of New York County, commonly known as Manhattan District Attorney, is the elected district attorney for New York County, New York. The office is responsible for the prosecution of violations of New York state laws (federal law violations in Manhattan are prosecuted by the U.S. Attorney for the Southern District of New York). The current district attorney is Alvin Bragg Jr.. He was elected in 2021 to succeed Cyrus Vance Jr.

District attorneys are legally permitted to delegate the prosecution of petty crimes or offenses. Prosecutors do not normally handle New York City Criminal Court summons court cases, and the Manhattan district attorney has a memorandum of understanding with the New York City Police Department allowing their legal bureau to selectively prosecute them.

== History ==
In the legislative act of February 12, 1796, New York State was divided into seven districts, each with an Assistant Attorney General, except New York County where Attorney General Josiah Ogden Hoffman prosecuted personally until 1801.

From 1801 to 1813, New York County was part of the First District, which included the counties of New York, Kings, Queens, Richmond, and Suffolk. At that time, Queens included current-day Nassau County and Westchester included the Bronx. In 1813, Westchester County was apportioned to a new district with Rockland and Putnam counties, and in 1815, New York County became the Twelfth District—the only one at the time that was a single county. In 1818, each county in the state became its own district.

From 1874 to 1895, New York County included the West Bronx, and from 1895 to 1913 it included all of what is now Bronx County, governing the same area as does the present Borough of the Bronx. On January 1, 1914, the Bronx became a separate county with its own district attorney.

Until 1822, the district attorney was appointed by the Council of Appointment, and held the office "during the Council's pleasure", meaning that there was no defined term of office. Under the provisions of the New York State Constitution of 1821, the district attorney was appointed to a three-year term by the County Court, and under the provisions of the Constitution of 1846, the office became elective by popular ballot. The term was three years, beginning on January 1 and ending on December 31. In case of a vacancy, an acting district attorney was appointed by the Court of General Sessions until the Governor of New York filled the vacancy with an interim appointment until an election was held for the remainder of the term.

The Consolidation Charter of 1896 extended the term by a year of the incumbent John R. Fellows, who had been elected in 1893 to a three-year term (1894–1896). Since the city election of 1897, the district attorney's term has coincided with the mayor's term and has been four years long. In case of a vacancy, the governor can make an interim appointment until a special election is held for the remainder of the term.

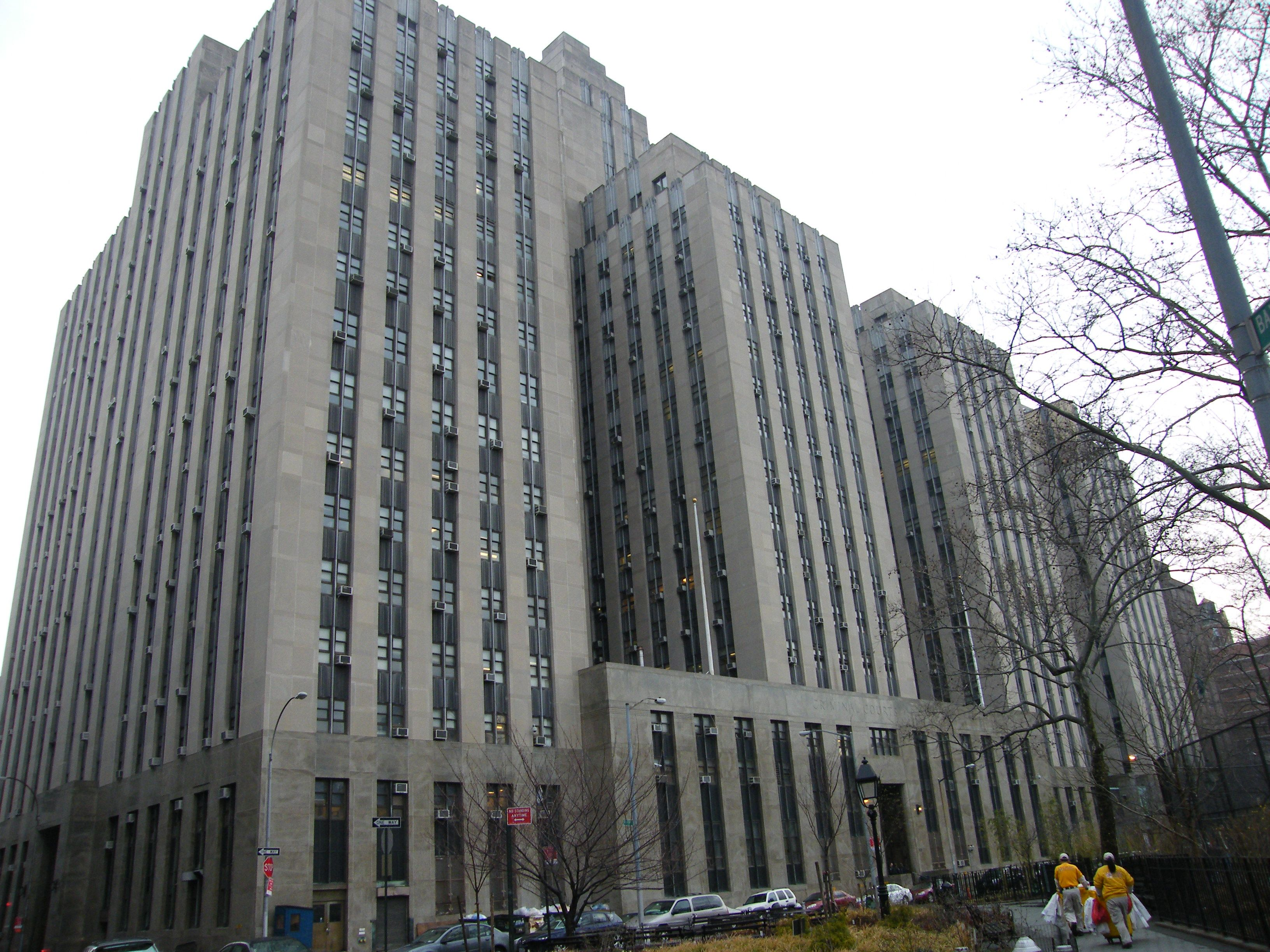
The office operates out of the New York County Criminal Courthouse at 1 Hogan Place (100 Centre Street)

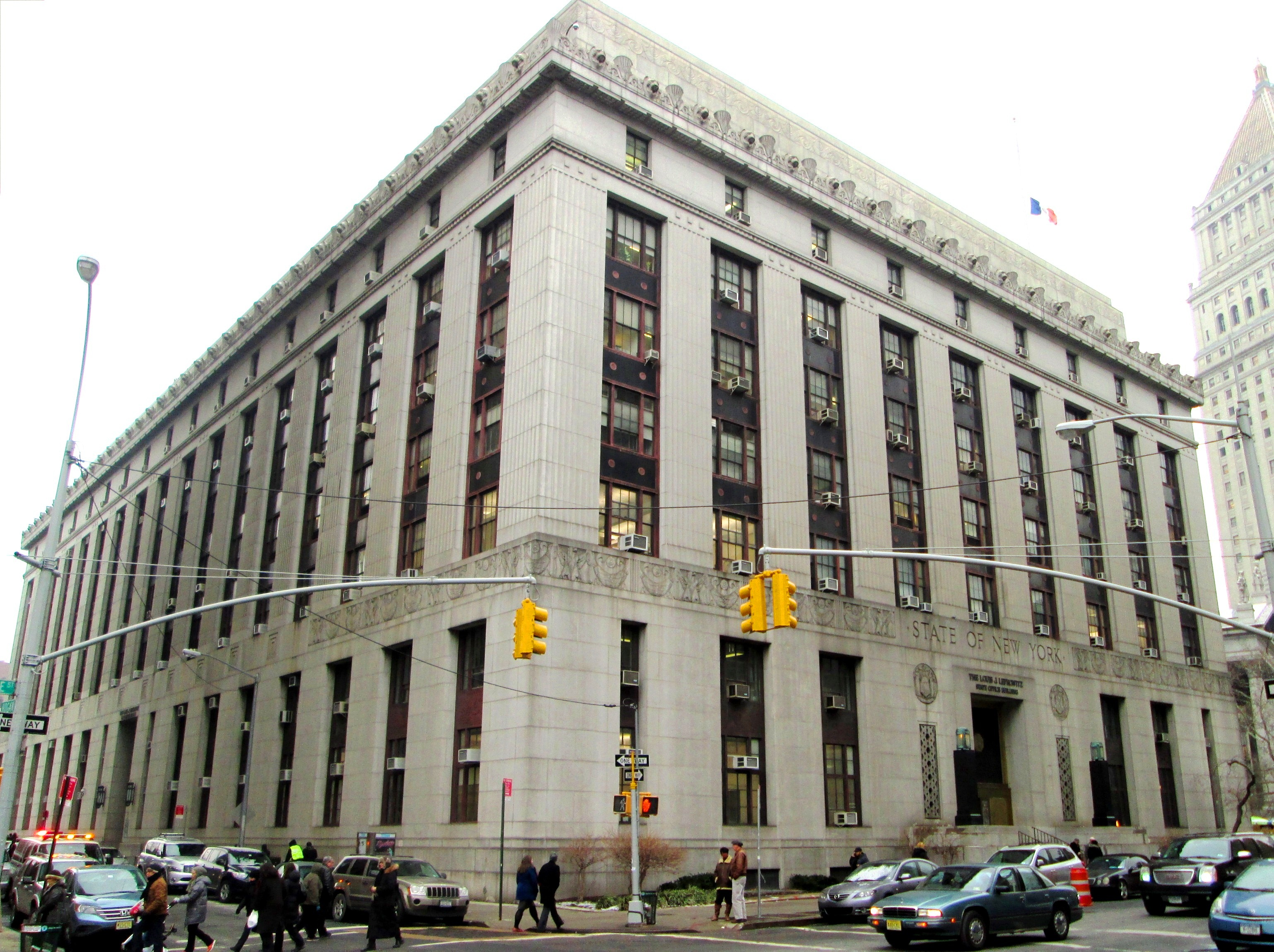
The district attorney also operates out of the Louis J. Lefkowitz State Office Building on 80 Centre Street (141 Worth Street).

== List of district attorneys ==
No.	District Attorney	Dates in office	Party	Notes
1	Richard Riker	August 19, 1801 – February 13, 1810	Dem.-Rep.	
2	Cadwallader D. Colden	February 13, 1810 – February 19, 1811	Federalist	
3	Richard Riker	February 19, 1811 – March 5, 1813	Dem.-Rep.	
4	Barent Gardenier	March 5, 1813 – March 31, 1815	Federalist	
5	John Rodman	March 31, 1815 – January 28, 1817	Dem.-Rep.	
6	Hugh Maxwell	January 28, 1817 – June 11, 1818	Dem.-Rep.	
7	Pierre C. Van Wyck	June 11, 1818 – February 13, 1821	Dem.-Rep.	
8	Hugh Maxwell	February 13, 1821 – May 1829	Dem.-Rep.	last to be appointed by the Council of Appointment; re-appointed by the Court of General Sessions to two three-year terms
9	Ogden Hoffman	May 1829 – May 22, 1835	Democratic	appointed to two three-year terms
10	Thomas Phoenix	May 22, 1835 – June 4, 1838	?	appointed to a three-year term
11	James R. Whiting	June 4, 1838 – June 10, 1844	Democratic	appointed to two three-year terms
12	Matthew C. Paterson	June 10, 1844 – January 26, 1846	?	appointed to a three-year term; died in office
13	John McKeon	February 6, 1846 – December 31, 1850	Democratic	last to be appointed by the Court of General Sessions and first to be elected by popular ballot (at the judicial state election of May 1847 to a term of three and a half years)
14	N. Bowditch Blunt	January 1, 1851 – July 17, 1854	Whig	elected to two three-year terms; died in office
–	Lorenzo B. Shepard	July 25, 1854 – December 31, 1854 (interim)	Democratic	appointed by Governor Horatio Seymour; declined to be nominated to run for election
15	A. Oakey Hall	January 1, 1855 – December 31, 1857	Whig	elected to a three-year term; did not run for re-election
16	Peter B. Sweeny	January 1, 1858 – October 3, 1858	Democratic	elected to a three-year term; resigned because of ill health
–	Joseph Blunt	October 5, 1858 – December 31, 1858 (interim)	Republican	appointed by Governor John A. King
17	Nelson J. Waterbury	January 1, 1859 – December 31, 1861	Democratic	elected to a three-year term; lost election to Hall
18	A. Oakey Hall	January 1, 1862 – December 31, 1870	Republican (1861); Democratic (1864, 1867)	second tenure, elected to three three-year terms; resigned to take office as Mayor of New York City
19	Samuel B. Garvin	January 5, 1869 – December 31, 1869 (acting); January 1, 1870 – December 31, 1872	Democratic	appointed by Governor John T. Hoffman; elected to a three-year term; did not run for re-election
20	Benjamin K. Phelps	January 1, 1873 – December 30, 1880	Republican	elected to three three-year terms; died in office
–	Daniel G. Rollins	January 3, 1881 – January 10, 1881 (acting); January 10, 1881 – December 31, 1881 (interim)	Republican	appointed acting district attorney by the Court of General Sessions, then appointed interim district attorney for the remainder of Phelps' term by Governor Alonzo B. Cornell; did not run for re-election (ran for Surrogate instead, and won)
21	John McKeon	January 1, 1882 – November 22, 1883	Democratic	second tenure, elected to a three-year term; died in office
–	John Vincent	November 22, 1883 – November 30, 1883 (acting)	Democratic	appointed by the Court of General Sessions to act until the governor's appointment of a successor
–	Wheeler Hazard Peckham	November 30, 1883 – December 9, 1883 (interim)	Democratic	appointed by Governor Grover Cleveland, then resigned due to ill health
–	Peter B. Olney	December 10, 1883 – December 31, 1884 (interim)	Democratic	appointed by Governor Cleveland; did not run for election
22	Randolph B. Martine	January 1, 1885 – December 31, 1887	Democratic	elected to a three-year term; did not run for re-election, became a judge in the Court of General Sessions
23	John R. Fellows	January 1, 1888 – December 31, 1890	Democratic	elected to a three-year term; did not run for re-election (ran for Congress instead, and won)
24	De Lancey Nicoll	January 1, 1891 – December 31, 1893	Democratic	elected to a three-year term; did not seek renomination
25	John R. Fellows	January 1, 1894 – December 7, 1896	Democratic	second tenure, elected to a three-year term that was extended by one year so that the district attorney, the mayor, and other city officers would be elected in the same year; died in office shortly before the extra year began
–	Vernon M. Davis	December 7, 1896 – December 19, 1896 (acting)	Democratic	appointed by the Court of General Sessions to act until the appointment of a successor by the governor
–	William M. K. Olcott	December 19, 1896 – December 31, 1897 (interim)	Republican	appointed by Governor Levi P. Morton
26	Asa Bird Gardiner	January 1, 1898 – December 22, 1900	Democratic	elected a four-year term; removed from office by Governor Theodore Roosevelt for corruption
–	Eugene A. Philbin	December 22, 1900 – December 31, 1901 (interim)	Democratic	appointed by Governor Roosevelt
–	George W. Schurman	January 1, 1902 (acting)	Republican	appointed by Mayor Seth Low until Jerome was sworn in
27	William T. Jerome	January 2, 1902 – December 31, 1909	Fusion/Ind.	elected on a Fusion ticket nominated by Anti-Tammany Democrats, Republicans and Citizens Union; re-elected in 1905 as an Independent, was also nominated by the Republican Party too late to appear on the ballot; not nominated for re-election
28	Charles Seymour Whitman	January 1, 1910 – December 31, 1914	Republican	elected to two four-year terms; resigned to take office as Governor of New York
–	Charles A. Perkins	January 1, 1915 – December 31, 1915 (interim)	Republican	appointed by Whitman, who was his predecessor district attorney and became governor; defeated by Swann in a special election
29	Edward Swann	January 1, 1916 – December 31, 1921	Democratic	elected to the remainder of Whitman's second term; re-elected to a four-year term; did not seek renomination
30	Joab H. Banton	January 1, 1922 – December 31, 1929	Democratic	elected to two four-year terms; did not seek renomination
31	Thomas C. T. Crain	January 1, 1930 – December 31, 1933	Democratic	elected to a four-year term; did not run for re-election
32	William C. Dodge	January 1, 1934 – December 31, 1937	Democratic	elected to a four-year term; not nominated for re-election by Tammany Hall
33	Thomas E. Dewey	January 1, 1938 – December 31, 1941	Republican, American Labor, City Fusion	elected to a four-year term; did not run for re-election
34	Frank Hogan	January 1, 1942 – August 10, 1973	Democratic	initially elected on the Democratic, Republican, American Labor, Fusion, and United City tickets; elected to eight terms; tendered his resignation on December 26, 1973 after being re-elected the prior month, and technically remained in office until Kuh was sworn in
–	Alfred J. Scotti	August 10, 1973 – February 13, 1974 (acting)	Democratic	acting district attorney from the time Hogan was hospitalized until Kuh was sworn in
–	Richard Kuh	February 13, 1974 – December 31, 1974 (interim)	Democratic	appointed by Governor Malcolm Wilson for the remainder of the year; defeated by Morgenthau in both the Democratic primary and a special general election running as a Republican for the remainder of Hogan's term
35	Robert Morgenthau	January 1, 1975 – December 31, 2009	Democratic	defeated Kuh in both the Democratic primary and in a special election for the remainder of Hogan's ninth term; re-elected to eight four-year terms
36	Cyrus Vance Jr.	January 1, 2010 – December 31, 2021	Democratic	elected to three four-year terms; retired
37	Alvin Bragg Jr.	January 1, 2022 – incumbent	Democratic	elected to a four-year term

== In popular culture ==
=== Films ===
- Legal Eagles (1986)

=== Television series ===
- The D.A.'s Man, which ran for a single season on NBC in 1959, starred John Compton as Shannon, an undercover investigator for the Manhattan DA's office. Produced by Jack Webb, the series fictionalized the career of real-life Manhattan DA's Investigator Harold Danforth, whose autobiography, also titled The D.A.'s Man, written in collaboration with veteran, Pulitzer Prize-winning police reporter James D. Horan, had won an Edgar from the Mystery Writers of America for Best Fact Crime Book.
- For the People starred William Shatner as an idealistic young deputy district attorney in the Manhattan DA's Office, Howard da Silva as his supervisor, and Lonny Chapman as his investigator.
- Hawk, which ran for a half-season in 1966, starred Burt Reynolds as Lt. John Hawk, a detective assigned to NYPD's Manhattan DA's Squad.
- Cagney & Lacey was revived in 1994 for a series of irregularly scheduled two-hour TV-movies. In the interim between these films and the original series, Cagney had been promoted to lieutenant and placed in command of the NYPD's Manhattan DA's Squad. Lacey, having retired some years earlier was persuaded to return to police work as a criminal investigator for the Manhattan DA's Bureau of Investigation, allowing the two partners to work together again. There were four movies in the revived series between 1994 and 1996.
- Blue Bloods: Depicts the prosecution of criminal suspects by lawyers of the New York County District Attorney's office through the character assistant district attorney Erin Reagan (Bridget Moynahan), who started out the series as a Trial Division Assistant District Attorney before being promoted to Deputy Bureau Chief in toward the end of Season 3 and then to Trial Division Bureau Chief at the start of Season 9. Since Season 5, Erin has worked closely with D.A. Investigator Anthony Abetemarco (Steven R. Schirripa).
- Law & Order: The long-running television series Law & Order and its spin-offs depict the prosecution of criminal suspects by lawyers of the New York County District Attorney's office. In the original pilot episode "Everybody's Favorite Bagman", shot in 1988, Roy Thinnes was cast as District Attorney Alfred Wentworth. Subsequent district attorneys depicted in the franchise are Adam Schiff (1990–2000), Nora Lewin (2000–2002), Arthur Branch (2002–2007), Jack McCoy (2008–2011, 2018–2024), and Nicholas Baxter (2024–present). Law & Order ceased production in 2010, but McCoy (though not seen) was still occasionally mentioned as being the Manhattan district attorney in the spin-off series Law & Order: Special Victims Unit in several episodes through 2011. A reference to "the new DA" in a 2013 episode indicated that McCoy had moved on from the position presumably sometime in 2012; his replacement was unnamed. However, McCoy became the district attorney again as of 2018, showing up in an SVU episode and later during the 21st season of Law & Order that started in 2022.
