= De Lancey Nicoll =

American lawyer

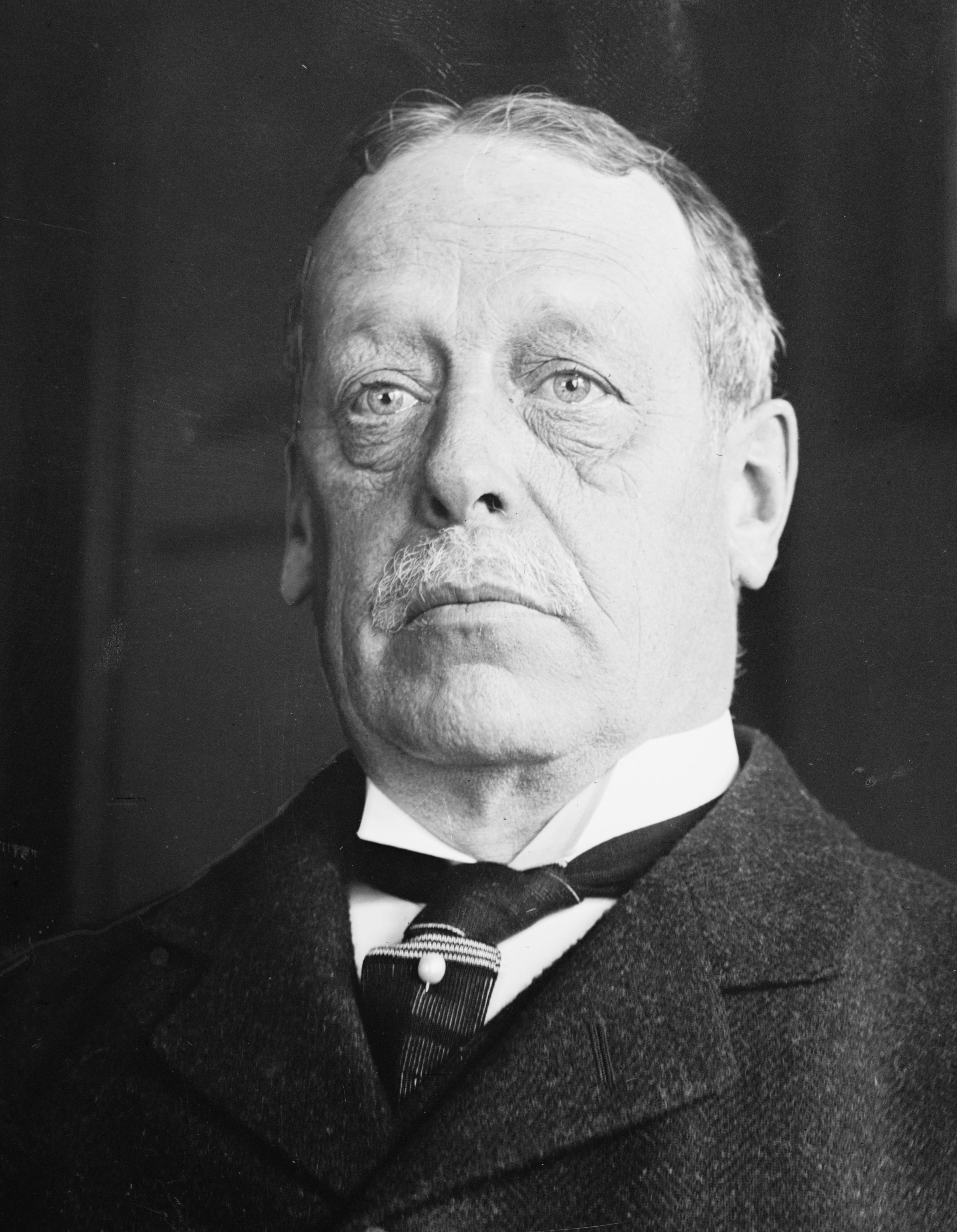

New York County District Attorney
- In office 1891–1893
- Preceded by: John R. Fellows
- Succeeded by: John R. Fellows

Personal details
- Born: June 24, 1854 Shelter Island, New York, U.S.
- Died: March 31, 1931 (aged 76) Manhattan, New York City, U.S.
- Party: Republican, Democrat
- Spouse: Maud Churchill (m. 1890; died 1924)
- Children: De Lancey Nicoll Jr.
- Parent(s): Solomon Townsend Nicoll; Charlotte Anne Nicoll
- Relatives: Courtlandt Nicoll (nephew)
- Education: St. Paul's School
- Alma mater: Princeton University; Columbia Law School

De Lancey Nicoll (June 24, 1854 – March 31, 1931) was a New York County District Attorney.

== Early life ==
De Lancey Nicoll was born on Shelter Island on June 24, 1854. He was the son of Solomon Townsend Nicoll (1813–1864) and Charlotte Anne Nicoll (1827–1891). State Senator Courtlandt Nicoll (1880–1938) was his nephew.

He attended St. Paul's School in Concord, New Hampshire; and graduated from Princeton University in 1874, and from Columbia Law School in 1876.

== Career ==
After serving in private practice, he was appointed Assistant New York County District Attorney by D.A. Randolph B. Martine in 1885. In November 1887, he ran on the Citizens Reform, Republican and Irving Hall (a faction of Anti-Tammany Democrats) tickets to succeed Martine as D.A., but was defeated by his fellow Assistant D.A. John R. Fellows who ran on the Tammany Hall/County Democracy (the larger faction of Anti-Tammany Democrats) ticket. Upon taking office in January 1888, Fellows dismissed Nicoll from the office of Assistant D.A.

In November 1890, Nicoll ran on the Tammany Hall ticket to succeed Fellows as D.A., and was elected. Nicoll was D.A. from January 1891 until the end of 1893. Afterwards he resumed the practice of law.

In 1896, Nicoll was among the Democrats who repudiated William Jennings Bryan and campaigned for Republican William McKinley. In 1904, he was chosen by Chairman Thomas Taggart as Vice Chairman of the Democratic National Committee.

He successfully represented Joseph Pulitzer and the New York World in a libel case that went to the U.S. Supreme Court in 1910 regarding press freedom. During the 1908 U.S. presidential campaign, the New York World had published an account of how a consortium involving President Theodore Roosevelt's brother-in-law Douglas Robinson, U.S. Secretary of War William H. Taft's brother Charles P. Taft, William Nelson Cromwell and J. P. Morgan had bought the French Panama Canal company for US$4,000,000 and re-sold it to the U.S. government for US$40,000,000, thus netting a fortune of about US$36,000,000.

== Personal life ==
On December 11, 1890, he married Maud Churchill (1871–1924). Together, they were the parents of:

- De Lancey Nicoll Jr. (1892–1957), also an attorney.
- Josephine Churchill Nicoll (1894–1915), who died at age 19.

Nicoll died at his home at 23 East 39th Street in Manhattan. He left a fortune of nearly a million and a half dollars.

== See also ==
- John Jay McKelvey, Sr., attorney, founder of Harvard Law Review

Legal offices
Preceded by John R. Fellows	New York County District Attorney; 1891 - 1893	Succeeded by John R. Fellows
