= Tanberry =

Tanberry may refer to:

- Tanberry Creek: see List of watercourses in Western Australia, T-V
- Mrs. Tanberry: a character in The Two Vanrevels by Booth Tarkington
