= Margaret Packham Hargrave =

Australian poet and writer (born 1941)

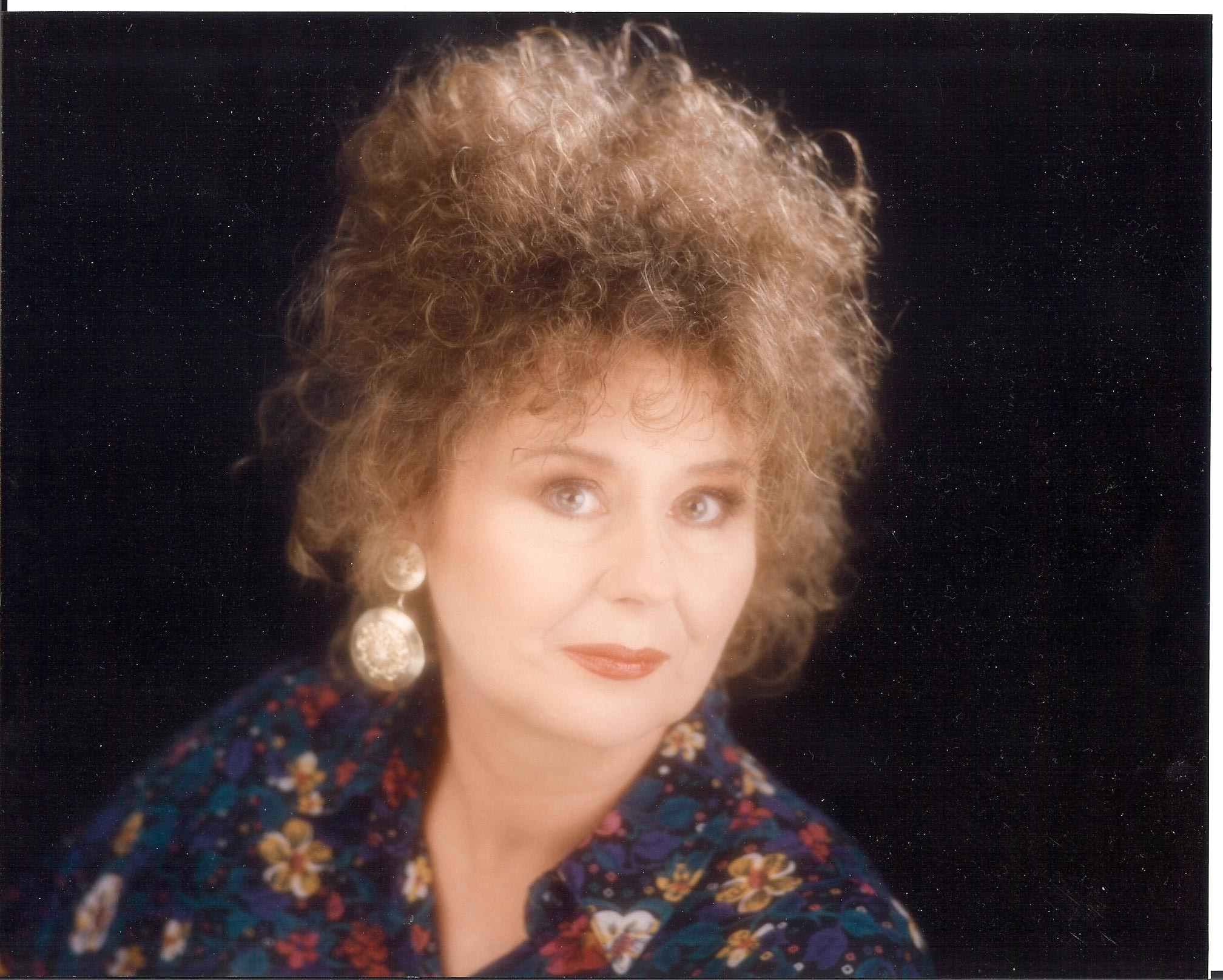
- Margaret Packham Hargrave, 1998
- Born: Margaret Ruth Packham; 1941 (age 84–85); Sydney, New South Wales, Australia
- Other name: Inez Frazer
- Occupations: Writer, poet, nurse, teacher
- Known for: A Woman of Air

Margaret Packham Hargrave (born Margaret Ruth Packham, 1941) is an Australian poet and writer. She is the author of two novels, Jake's Luck (1994) and A Woman of Air (1996), winner of the inaugural Elle/Random House Fiction Prize. Her early career was as a nursing academic and then as a secondary English teacher.

== Life and career ==
Margaret Packham Hargrave was born as Margaret Ruth Packham on 8 November 1941 and grew up in the Sydney suburb of Auburn, Beverly Hills, and Jannali. For secondary education she attended Sutherland High School and Moor-field Girls High School, Kogarah. Her tertiary studies were at New South Wales State Conservatorium of Music, where she studied voice with Raymond Beatty and viola with Georgiana Maclean, and concurrently at Sydney Hospital, where she studied nursing from January 1960 to December 1963. Subsequently, she completed a Bachelor of Arts majoring in English and Psychology, and Master of Letters in Middle English/Chaucer at the University of New England and a Diploma of Education at Mitchell College. She had an early career as a nurse from March 1964 to June 1967, including as a lecturer in Nursing Studies, publishing a research paper, "Literature in the Nursing Course", in The Australian Journal of Advanced Nursing (1985). From July 1978 to December 1984, she worked as a poultry farmer near Dubbo and was a freelance journalist for the local newspaper, Daily Liberal. She then became a teacher of secondary English from February 1987 to August 2006 before committing herself to writing.

Since August 1974, Hargrave has also worked as a freelance writer and has had short stories and poems published in various magazines or newspapers: Westerly, Meanjin, The Sydney Morning Herald, Cleo, Grass Roots and Matilda. A book of her poems, Midnight Fugue, was published in 1983. She developed an interest in screenwriting and her first short film, A Difficult Patient – based on her book, A Woman of Air – was produced and directed by Tony Chu of NAFA Productions and was exhibited at the Cannes Short Film Corner in 2009. Original music for the film was composed by Nathan Chan. In September 2008, she was elected to Sutherland Shire Council as one of the team of Shire Watch Independents. She left the council in September 2012.

== Bibliography ==
=== Short stories ===
- "The Sound of Crying", Cleo, August, 1974
- "The Chiffionier", Westerly (4), 1988
- "Domestica", Westerly (1), 1989
- "Small Fame", Westerly(4), 1989
- Packham Hargrave, Margaret (Autumn 1990). "My Sister's Memory". Meanjin. 49 (1): 134–136. ISSN 0025-6293.

=== Poetry ===
- Anthologised in: Poets' Choice, 1977; Holes in the Evening (1982), Fat Possum Press; and That Moon-Filled Urge (1985), Kardoorair Press.
- Hargrave, Margaret (1983). Midnight Fugue. Cammeray, NSW: Saturday Centre. ISBN 978-0-909293-49-9.

=== Novels ===
- Jake's Luck (1994) Allen & Unwin
- Packham Hargrave, Margaret (1996). A Woman of Air. Milsons Point, NSW: Random House. ISBN 978-0-09-183257-5. – Recipient of Elle/Random House Fiction Prize.

=== Articles ===
- "New Horizons: Literary Studies in the Nursing Course", The Australian Journal of Advanced Nursing, Vol. 3 No. 1 (1985), cited in Begley, Ann-Marie, 'Literature and Poetry: Pleasure and Practice', International Journal of Nursing Practice (2), December, 1996
- "A Tale of Two Lives", Family Circle, June 2004 (writing as Inez Frazer)
