= Tommyhawk =

Tommyhawk can refer to:

- an alternate spelling of tomahawk (axe)
- "Tommyhawk", a 1954 song by Johnny Mandel
  - covered by Shelly Manne & His Men on the 1957 album More Swinging Sounds
- Tommyhawk Creek, a watercourse in Western Australia
- Tommy Hawk, the mascot for the Chicago Blackhawks of the National Hockey League
- a variation of the cutter maneuver in professional wrestling
