= Tin Dog Creek =

Small watercourse in Dowerin, Western Australia

Tin Dog Creek (31°15′S 117°03′E) is a small watercourse in Dowerin, Western Australia.

The name is said to have come from gold miners travelling to the Yilgarn goldfields who called their tinned beef "tinned dog" and would discard tins at the creek.
