= Amy-Lea Mills =

Australian athlete (born 1986)

Personal information
- Born: 31 August 1986 (age 39) Dubbo, New South Wales, Australia

Sport
- Country: Australia
- Sport: Women's Athletics
Medal record
Deaflympics
Gold medal – first place	Melbourne 2005	javelin throw
Gold medal – first place	Samsun 2013	javelin throw

Amy-Lea Mills or Amy Mills (born 31 August 1986) is an Australian Deaflympic track and field athlete who represented Australia in 2005 Summer Deaflympics, 2009 Summer Deaflympics and in 2013 Summer Deaflympics.

== Childhood ==
Amy Mills was born in Dubbo, New South Wales, Australia. She was born profoundly deaf in both ears but which was not diagnosed until 18 months of age.

== Career ==
Amy was encouraged and motivated to participate at the 2005 Summer Deaflympics, which was held in Australia in her home country by her teacher when she was just 18 years old. But in 2004, she met in a terrible car accident which was a major setback with a bad knee laceration and a broken thumb.

Despite the terrible accident, Amy competed at the 2005 Summer Deaflympics and went onto win a gold medal for javelin throw.

She repeated her gold medal hunt in the 2013 Summer Deaflympics for the javelin throw. Amy-Lea Mills also went onto set the new Deaflympic record for women's javelin throw with a distance of 45.98m in the 2013 Summer Deaflympics.
