= Dubbo =

- City
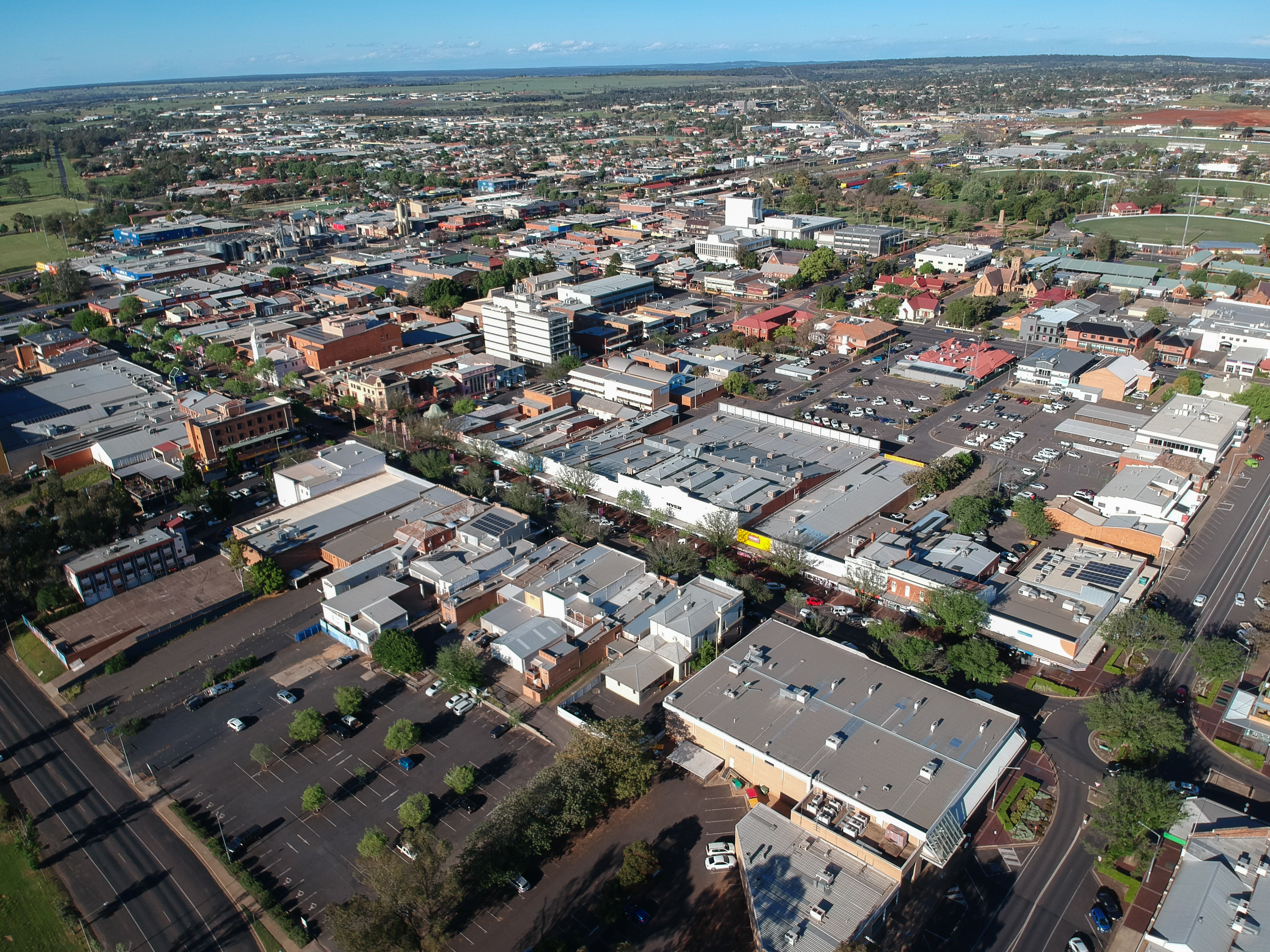
- Dubbo town centre from above, 2020

- Coordinates: 32°15′25″S 148°36′4″E
- Country: Australia
- State: New South Wales
- Region: Orana
- LGA: Dubbo Regional Council
- Location: 392 km (244 mi) NW of Sydney; 144 km (89 mi) NNW of Orange; 120 km (75 mi) NNE of Parkes; 66 km (41 mi) S of Gilgandra; 308 km (191 mi) SW of Tamworth
- Established: 1849; 1966 (city)

Government
  - State electorate: Dubbo
  - Federal division: Parkes

Area
  - Total: 182.6 km^{2} (70.5 sq mi)
- Elevation: 275 m (902 ft)

Population
  - Total: 43,516 (2021) (37)
  - Density: 238.31/km^{2} (617.23/sq mi)
- Time zone: UTC+10 (AEST)
  - Summer (DST): UTC+11 (AEDT)
- Postcode: 2830
- County: Gordon
- Mean max temp: 24.7 °C (76.5 °F)
- Mean min temp: 10.3 °C (50.5 °F)
- Annual rainfall: 584.5 mm (23.01 in)

Dubbo (/ˈdʌboʊ/ DUB-oh; Wiradjuri: Dhubu) is a city in the Orana Region of New South Wales, Australia. It is the largest population centre in the Orana region, with a population of 43,516 at June 2021.

The city is located at the intersection of the Newell, Mitchell, and Golden highways. Dubbo officially became a city in 1966. Dubbo is located roughly 275 m (902 ft) above sea level, 303 km (188 mi) north-west of Sydney (400 km (249 mi) by road) and is a major road and rail freight hub to other parts of New South Wales. It is linked by national highways north to Brisbane and Charleville, south towards Melbourne and Canberra, east to Sydney, Newcastle and Gosford and west to Broken Hill and Adelaide.

Dubbo is included in the rainfall and weather forecast region for the Central West Slopes and in the Central West Slopes and Plains division of the Bureau of Meteorology forecasts.

== History ==
Evidence of habitation by the Wiradjuri tribe, Indigenous Australians dates back over 40,000 years.

Explorer and surveyor John Oxley was the first European to report on the area, now known as Dubbo, in 1818. The first permanent British colonists in the area were English-born Robert Dulhunty and his brother Lawrence Dulhunty.

Dulhunty occupied a property, known as Dubbo Station (established in 1828), from the early 1830s on a squatting basis. With the passing of the Squatting Act in 1836, he took out a licence on the property.

Dulhunty showed an affinity with Indigenous Australians, his party included some 40 Aboriginals and he favoured using Aboriginal names for properties, including Dubbo. Dubbo is now thought to be a mispronunciation of the local Wiradjuri word thubbo, but because of a lack of precise records from Dulhunty at the time and an incomplete knowledge of the Wiradjuri language today, some conjecture remains over the word's meaning. Some references indicate that Dubbo was the name of an old Wiradjuri man who resided at the site when Dulhunty took the land. Dubbo's name apparently meant "red soil", consistent with the local landscape. Thubbo or tubbo possibly is Wiradjuri for "head covering".

Dundullimal Homestead is a farmhouse from that period, built around 1840 by John Maugham on his 26,000-acre (11,000 ha) sheep station. The building is one of the oldest homesteads still standing in western NSW and today is open to visitors.

In 1846, due to the number of settlers in the area, the government decided to establish a courthouse, police station, and lock-up in the Dubbo area. A constable's residence was completed in 1847 and a wooden slab-construction courthouse and lock-up was completed in early 1848. By this time, the settlement had only four buildings - the constable's residence, courthouse and lock-up, a store, and an inn.

Due to the lack of title for the land, in 1848, storekeeper Jean Emile Serisier organised a petition asking for a land sale of town allotments. The plan was presented to the colony's surveyor general in May 1849 by surveyor G. Boyle White. The settlement was gazetted as a village in November 1849 with the first land sales taking place in 1850. Population growth was slow until the Victorian gold rush of the 1860s brought an increase in north–south trade. The first bank was opened in 1867. Steady population growth caused the town to be proclaimed a municipality in 1872, when its population was 850. The railway extension of the main western railway from Wellington to Dubbo was formally opened on 1 February 1881. By 1897, Dubbo had a general store, Carrier Arms, a slab courthouse, a jail, and a police hut. The final section of the Molong to Dubbo railway opened in late May 1925. Dubbo was officially proclaimed a city in 1966.

== Heritage listings ==
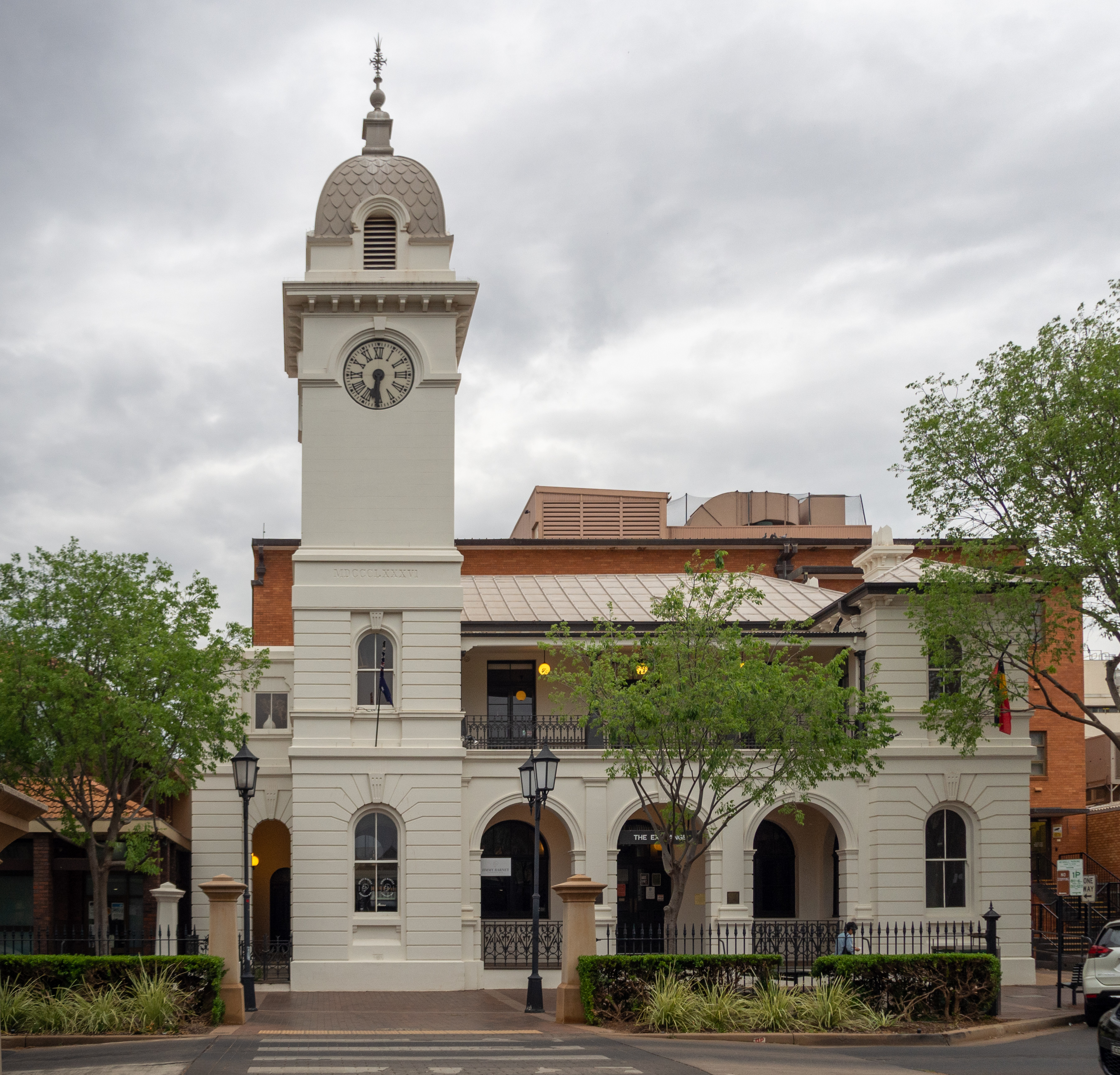
The former Dubbo Post Office

Dubbo has a number of heritage-listed sites, including:

- Cobra Street: Dubbo RAAF Stores Depot
- Macquarie Street: Talbragar Shire Council Chambers
- 110–114 Macquarie Street: National Australia Bank building, Dubbo
- 118 Macquarie Street: Colonial Mutual Life building, Dubbo
- 195–197 Macquarie Street: Milestone Hotel
- 215 Macquarie Street: Old Dubbo Gaol
- Main Western railway: Dubbo railway station
- Main Western railway 462.762 km: Macquarie River railway bridge, Dubbo
- Obley Road: Dundullimal Homestead

== Geography ==
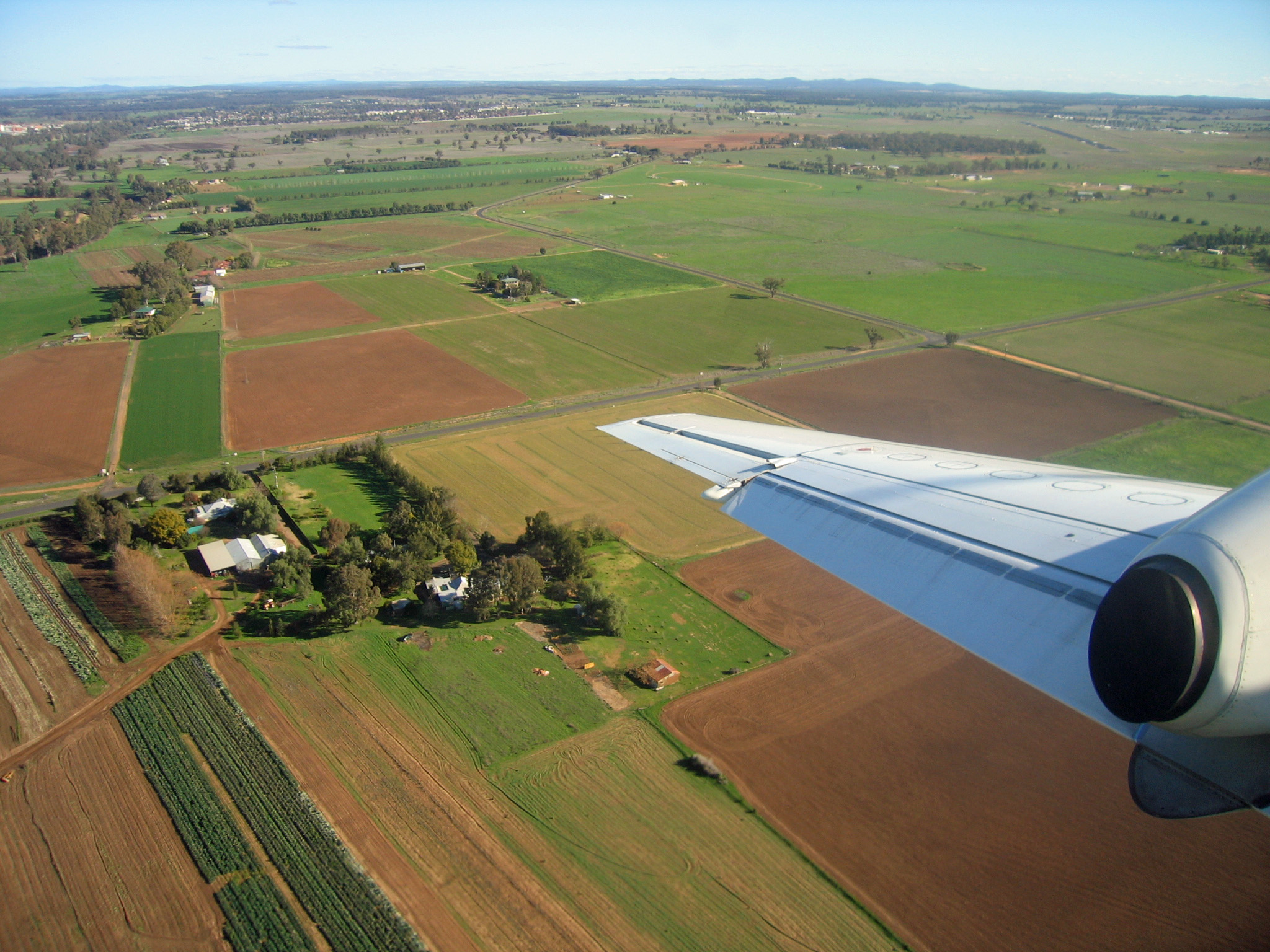
Plains of the Dubbo region, north of the township

The Macquarie River runs through Dubbo, as does Troy Creek. The City of Dubbo lies within a transition zone between the ranges and tablelands of the Great Dividing Range to the east and the Darling Basin plains to the west.

=== Climate ===
Dubbo falls in the warm temperate climate zone. Under the Köppen climate classification, Dubbo has a humid subtropical climate (Cfa) that borders the semi-arid climate (BSk). Summers are warm to hot, and winters cool to cold, bringing some occurrences of early morning frost but generally no snowfall – unlike the nearby city of Orange. The last occurrence of snow was recorded by The Dubbo Liberal and Macquarie Advocate in July 1951 and 1920, with a heavy fall of snow in July 1900. The town's location in this transition area allows a large temperature variation during the year, with high summer temperatures, often peaking above 40 °C (104 °F) typical of western New South Wales, and colder subzero temperatures typical of the Central Tablelands in winter.

Dubbo's location in the transition area between the Central Tablelands and the Central Western Plains has provided a mild distribution of rainfall throughout the year. Dubbo's wettest month is January with an average rainfall of 58.7 mm (2.31 in) occurring on average over five days. Evaporation in the Dubbo area averages around 1,880 mm (74 in) per year. Dubbo is considerably sunny, receiving 148.6 days of clear skies annually, in contrast to Sydney's 104 days.

Wind patterns vary over the whole year. The prevailing winds at Dubbo are from the southeast, south, southwest and west, which account for a combined 64.4% of the wind direction over the whole year.

Climate data for Dubbo Regional Airport AWS (1993–2026); 284 m AMSL; 32.22° S, 148.58° E
Month	Jan	Feb	Mar	Apr	May	Jun	Jul	Aug	Sep	Oct	Nov	Dec	Year
Record high °C (°F)	46.1 (115.0)	46.1 (115.0)	40.8 (105.4)	34.4 (93.9)	28.6 (83.5)	24.2 (75.6)	24.0 (75.2)	28.3 (82.9)	35.5 (95.9)	38.1 (100.6)	44.3 (111.7)	44.9 (112.8)	46.1 (115.0)
Mean daily maximum °C (°F)	33.6 (92.5)	32.1 (89.8)	29.2 (84.6)	24.8 (76.6)	20.0 (68.0)	16.4 (61.5)	15.7 (60.3)	17.7 (63.9)	21.5 (70.7)	25.2 (77.4)	28.7 (83.7)	31.6 (88.9)	24.7 (76.5)
Mean daily minimum °C (°F)	18.4 (65.1)	17.6 (63.7)	14.9 (58.8)	10.3 (50.5)	6.5 (43.7)	4.3 (39.7)	3.1 (37.6)	3.4 (38.1)	6.0 (42.8)	9.5 (49.1)	13.5 (56.3)	16.0 (60.8)	10.3 (50.5)
Record low °C (°F)	5.8 (42.4)	6.3 (43.3)	3.4 (38.1)	−2.2 (28.0)	−4.0 (24.8)	−4.9 (23.2)	−6.0 (21.2)	−4.9 (23.2)	−3.2 (26.2)	−0.4 (31.3)	2.0 (35.6)	4.5 (40.1)	−6.0 (21.2)
Average precipitation mm (inches)	60.0 (2.36)	46.8 (1.84)	66.8 (2.63)	39.5 (1.56)	38.4 (1.51)	48.3 (1.90)	43.9 (1.73)	37.3 (1.47)	41.2 (1.62)	49.5 (1.95)	62.4 (2.46)	60.2 (2.37)	594.3 (23.4)
Average precipitation days (≥ 1.0 mm)	5.4	4.9	5.2	3.3	4.0	5.7	5.4	4.3	4.7	5.1	5.7	4.9	58.6
Average afternoon relative humidity (%)	32	36	36	37	47	57	55	47	43	36	35	30	41
Average dew point °C (°F)	11.2 (52.2)	11.8 (53.2)	9.7 (49.5)	7.0 (44.6)	6.7 (44.1)	6.6 (43.9)	5.0 (41.0)	4.3 (39.7)	5.5 (41.9)	5.3 (41.5)	8.0 (46.4)	8.3 (46.9)	7.4 (45.3)
Source: Bureau of Meteorology (Dubbo Airport AWS, 1993–2026)

== Demographics ==
Historical population
Year	Pop.	±%
1921	5,032	—
1933	8,344	+65.8%
1947	9,686	+16.1%
1954	12,009	+24.0%
1961	14,118	+17.6%
1966	15,629	+10.7%
1971	17,810	+14.0%
1976	20,149	+13.1%
1981	23,986	+19.0%
1986	25,796	+7.5%
1991	28,064	+8.8%
1996	30,102	+7.3%
2001	30,860	+2.5%
2006	30,574	−0.9%
2011	32,327	+5.7%
2016	34,339	+6.2%
2021	38,783	+12.9%
Source: Australian Bureau of Statistics data.

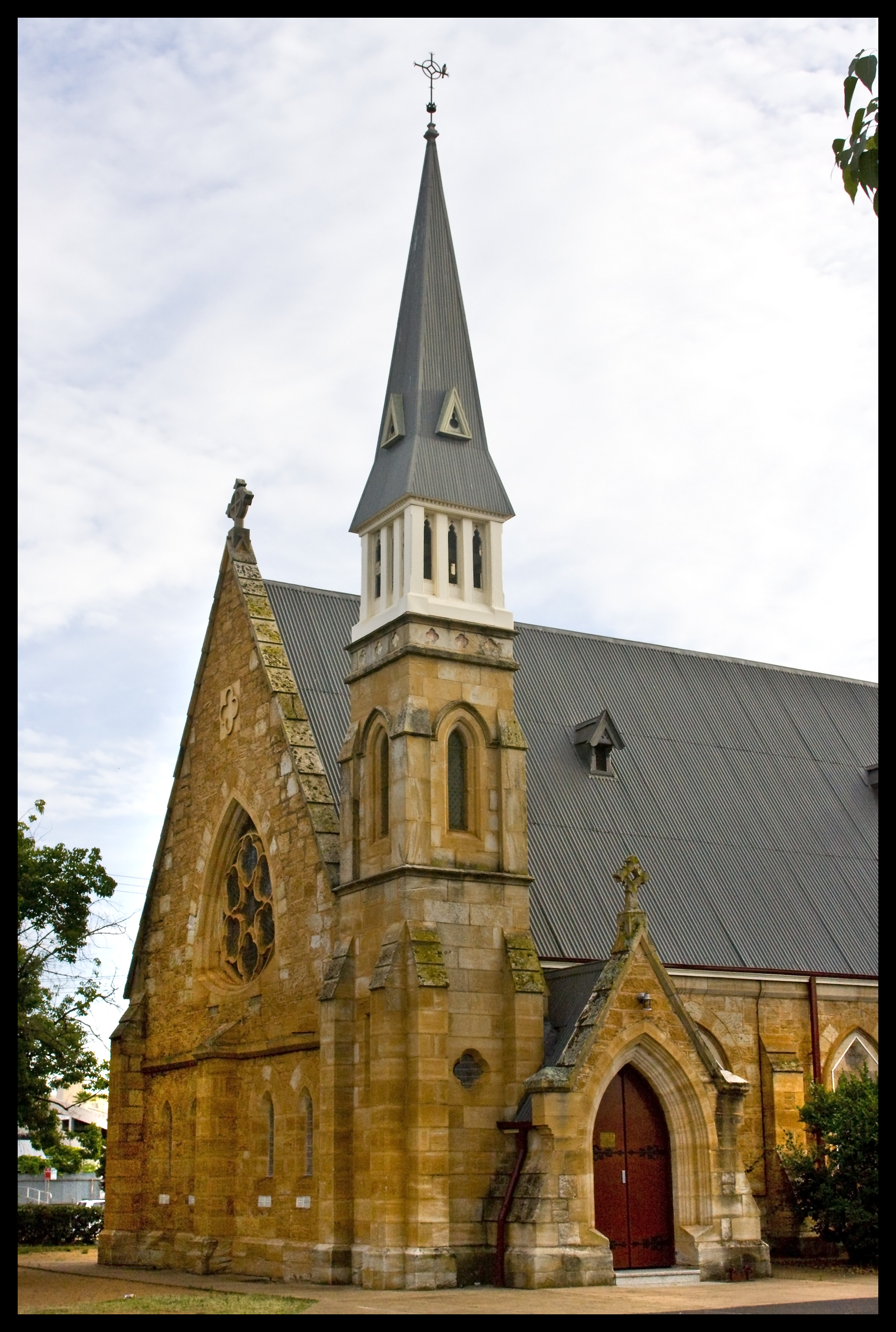
St Brigids Catholic Church

In August 2021, the population of Dubbo was 43,516; 51.6% of residents were female and 48.4% were male. The median age is 35, slightly younger than the national average of 38. People aged 0–14 constitute 21.5% of the population compared to 18.2% nationally, and 15.6% of residents are Aboriginal or Torres Strait Islander; the median age in this group is 22.

About 81.2% of residents report being born in Australia, notably higher than the national average of 66.9%. Other than Australia, the most common countries of birth are India (1.7%), Nepal (1.6%), England (1.0%), the Philippines (0.8%), and New Zealand (0.7%). The most common reported ancestries in Dubbo are Australian, English, Australian Aboriginal, Irish, and Scottish.

Around 72.3% of residents report both parents having been born in Australia, significantly higher than the national average of 45.9%. About 82.7% of people only spoke English at home. Other languages spoken at home included Nepali (1.7%), Punjabi (0.8%), Malayalam (0.5%), Urdu (0.5%), and Mandarin (0.4%).

The top religious groups in Dubbo are Catholic (26.4%), Anglican (17.7%), and Uniting Church (3.7%); 27.2% reported no religion (lower than the 38.4% nationally) and 9.2% did not answer the question.

== Economy ==
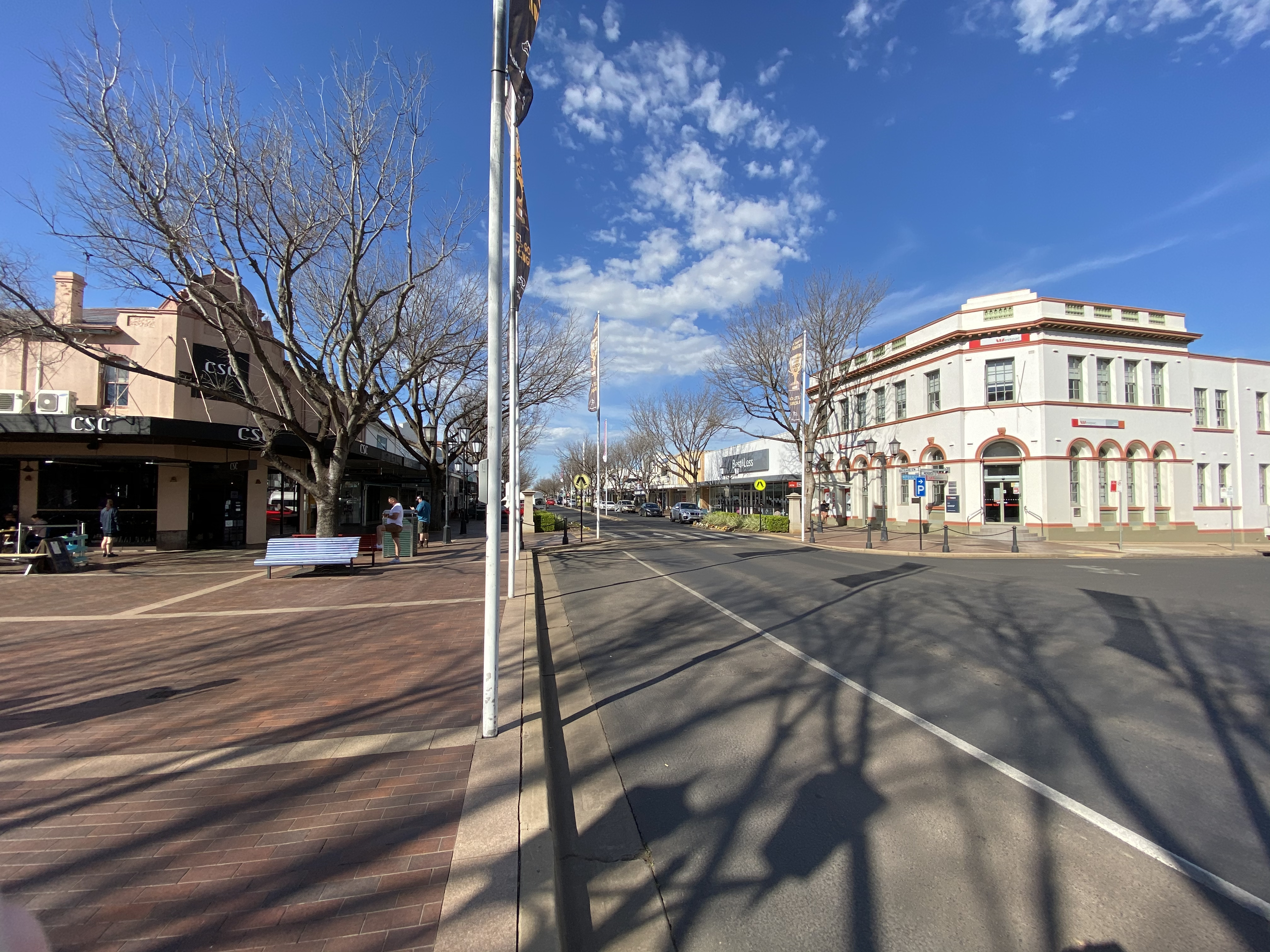
Macquarie Street, a civic and commercial hub

The city's largest private employer is Fletcher International Exports, which exports lamb and mutton globally. Other local industries reflect the city's status as a regional base for surrounding agricultural regions.

A large employer is the Dubbo Base Hospital, with hospitals (excluding psychiatric hospitals) being the area's single largest employer.

=== Retail ===
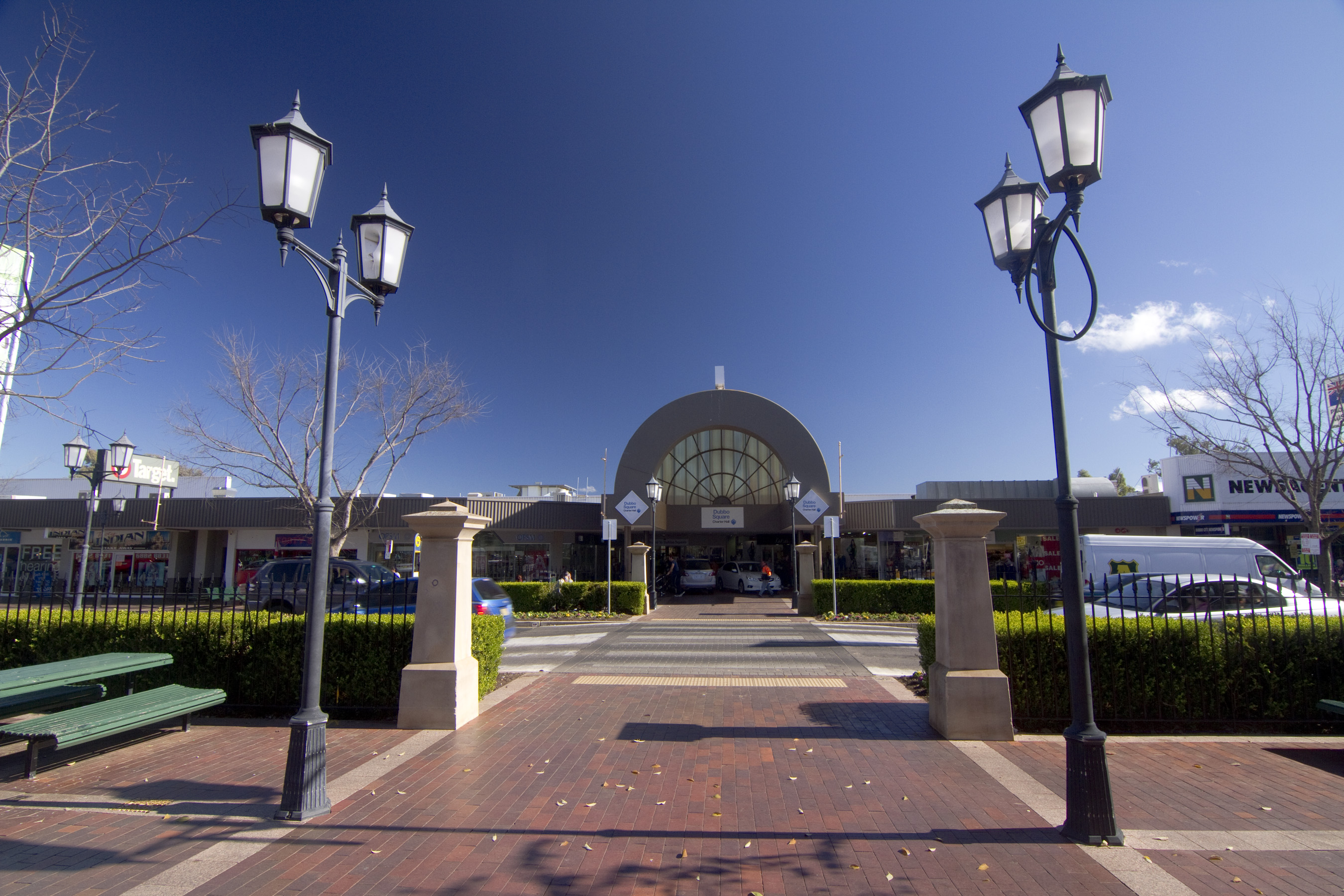
Dubbo Square

Dubbo is also considered a major shopping centre for the surrounding regional areas in the Central and Far Western districts of New South Wales. Dubbo has many shopping districts, including the large Orana Mall (East Dubbo), Macquarie and Talbragar Streets (City Centre), Centro Dubbo, Riverdale, Delroy Park (West Dubbo) and Tamworth Street local stores (South Dubbo). Dubbo features many boutiques and unique stores, as well as major national stores.

=== Tourism ===
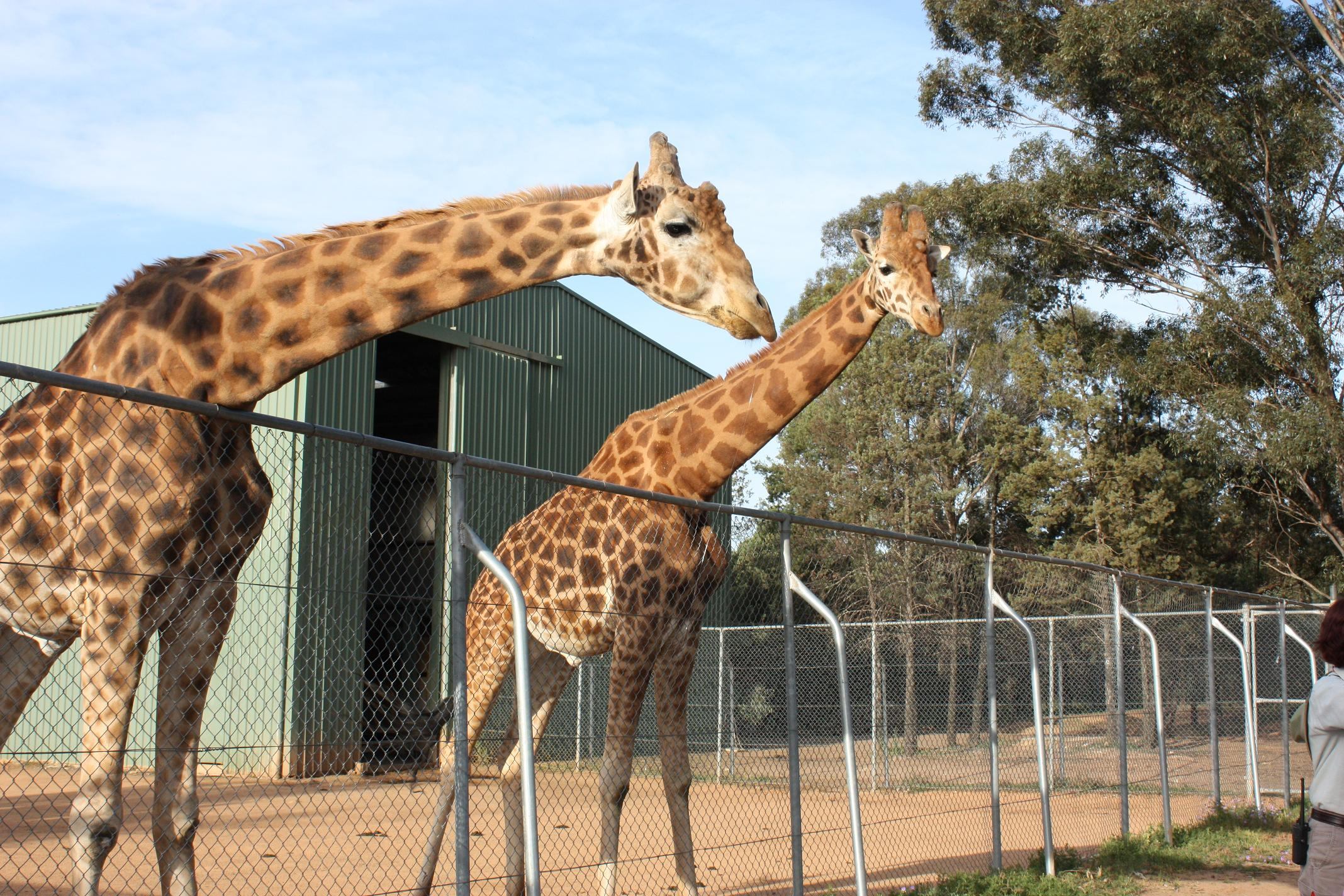
Taronga Western Plains Zoo

Tourism is also a significant local industry. Dubbo features the open-range Taronga Western Plains Zoo, which is home to various species of endangered animals, including the white, black, and Indian rhinoceroses, and runs a successful breeding program for a number of endangered species. The zoo is home to numerous specimens from around the world in spacious open-range moat enclosures, grouped according to their continent of origin. Other town attractions include the historic Dundullimal Homestead, and the historic Old Dubbo Gaol in the middle of the commercial centre of Macquarie Street. The Western Plains Cultural Centre includes four gallery exhibition spaces, two museum exhibition spaces, and a community arts centre.

The Royal Flying Doctor Service base at Dubbo Regional Airport has a large visitor information centre, staffed by volunteers, which features a King Air 200 turboprop aircraft and a variety of touch-screen interactive displays illustrating aspects of RFDS operations.

=== Rare-earths ===
The Dubbo mine and processing plant, located on the Toongi mineral deposit, has total ore reserves of over 75 million tonnes, and a rare-earth oxides proportion of 0.74%. The mine will produce zirconium dioxide, a material used in dental implants. The mine is being developed by Australian Strategic Minerals in partnership with Hyundai, with plans to process the ore in South Korea. It is a recipient of a government grant under the Commonwealth Government's "International Partnerships in Critical Minerals" program.

== Education ==
The 20 schools and secondary colleges include the Dubbo School of Distance Education. It is home to one of the seven main campuses of Charles Sturt University, which is located next to the Senior Campus of Dubbo College (successor to Dubbo High School, founded in 1917). There are four private K–12 schools located in Dubbo which are Central Western Leadership Academy, Macquarie Anglican Grammar School, Dubbo Christian School and St Johns College.

== Architecture ==
Dubbo has several fine examples of Victorian civic architecture, including the (third) Courthouse (1887), the Lands Office with its use of timber and corrugated iron cladding, and the railway station (1881). Towards the centre of the city, the older residential areas contain numerous examples of red brick houses built in the "California Bungalow" style architecture of the early 20th century, together with Victorian terraced houses (mostly in the Darling Street area) and a few Edwardian semidetached homes.

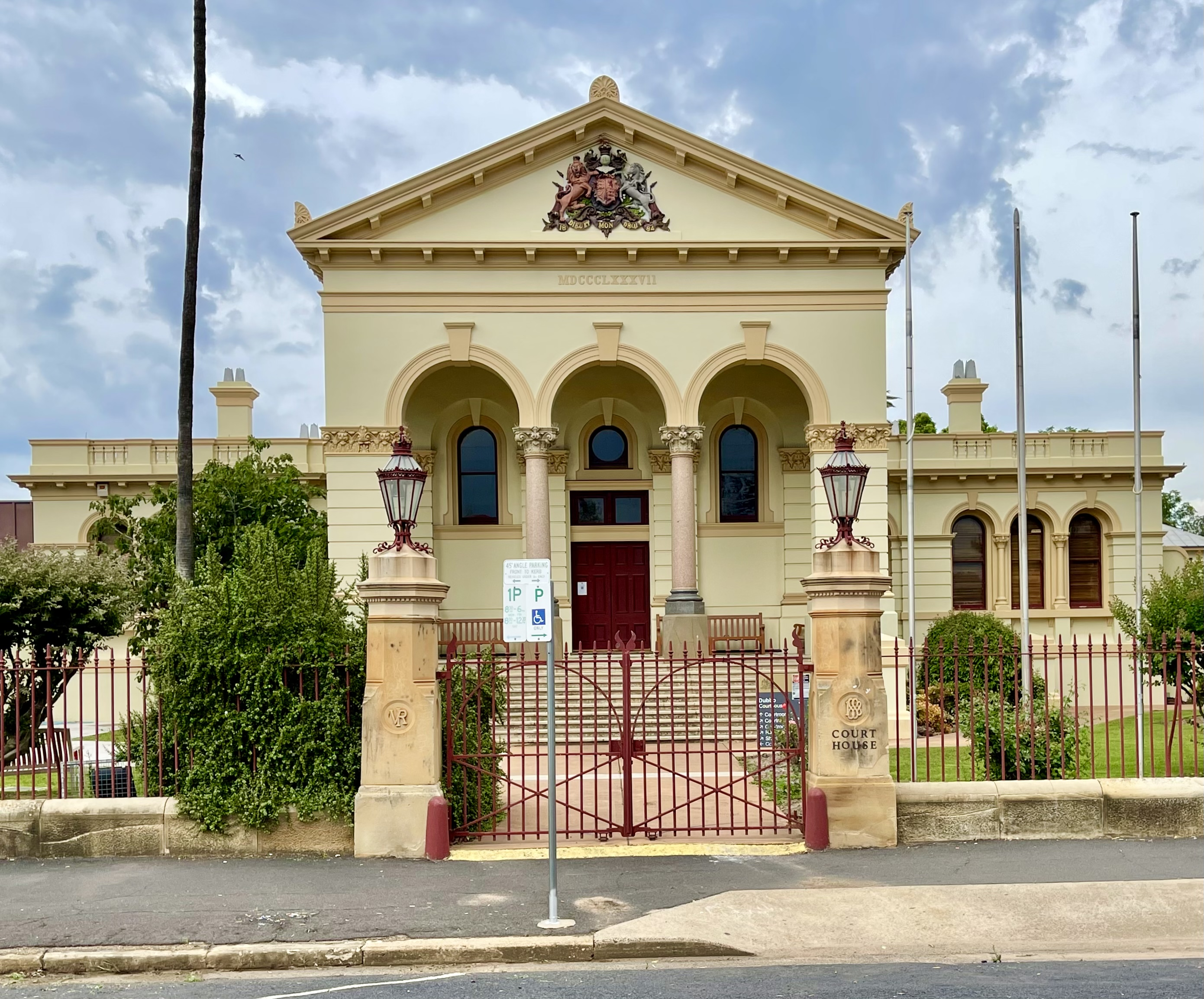
Dubbo Courthouse

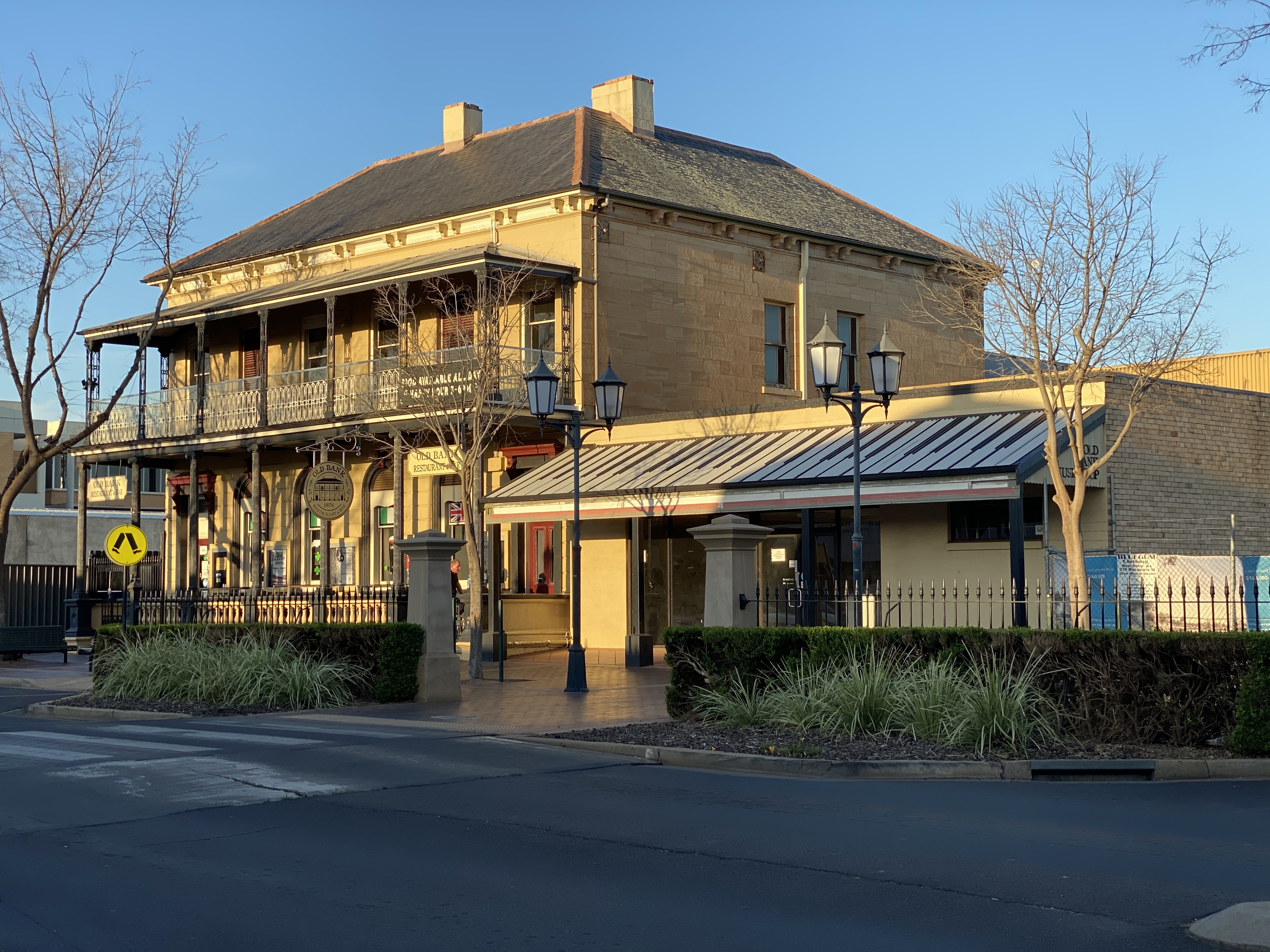
Old Bank Building

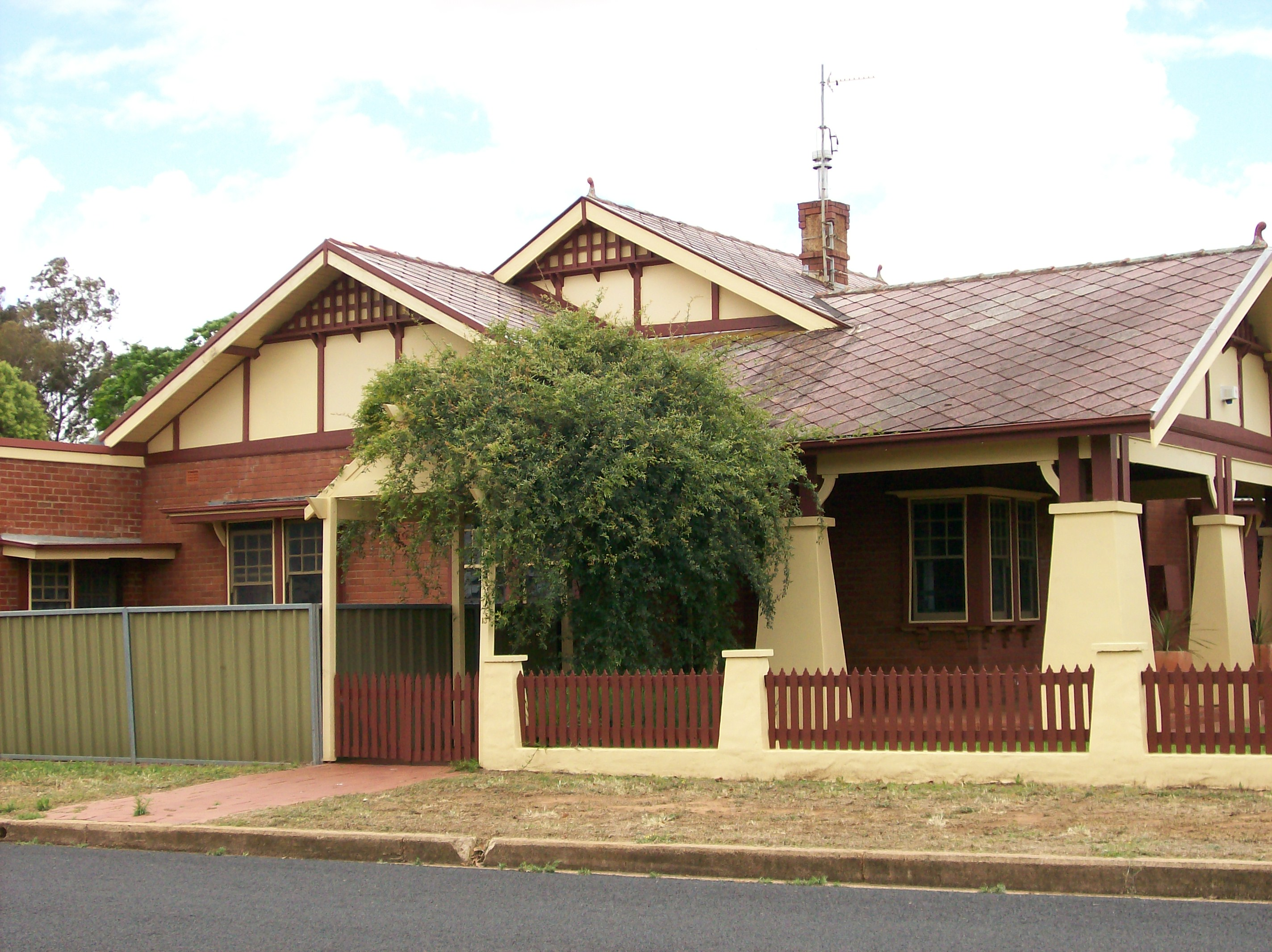
Bungalow home

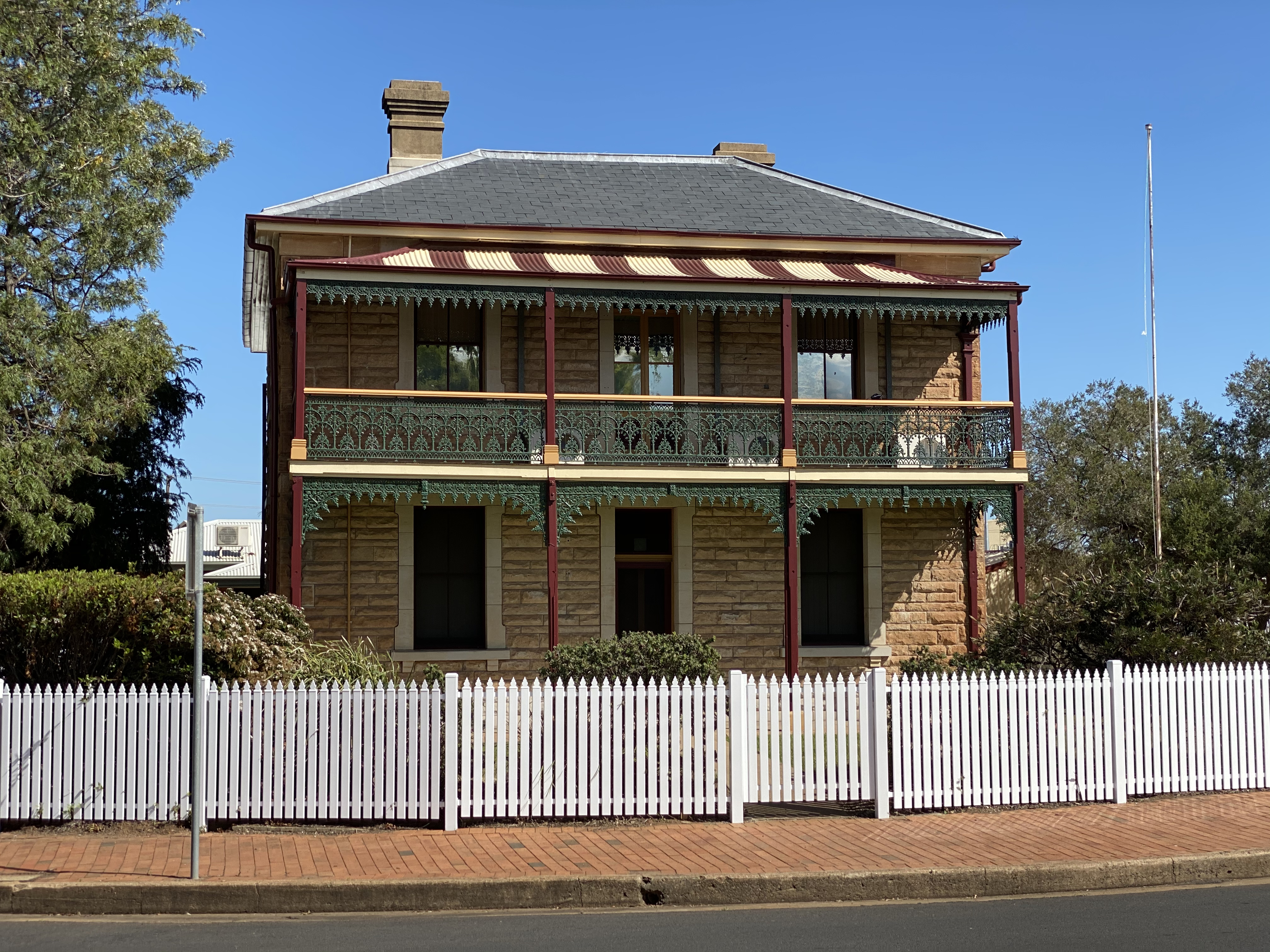
Station Master's Residence; an early Victorian residence

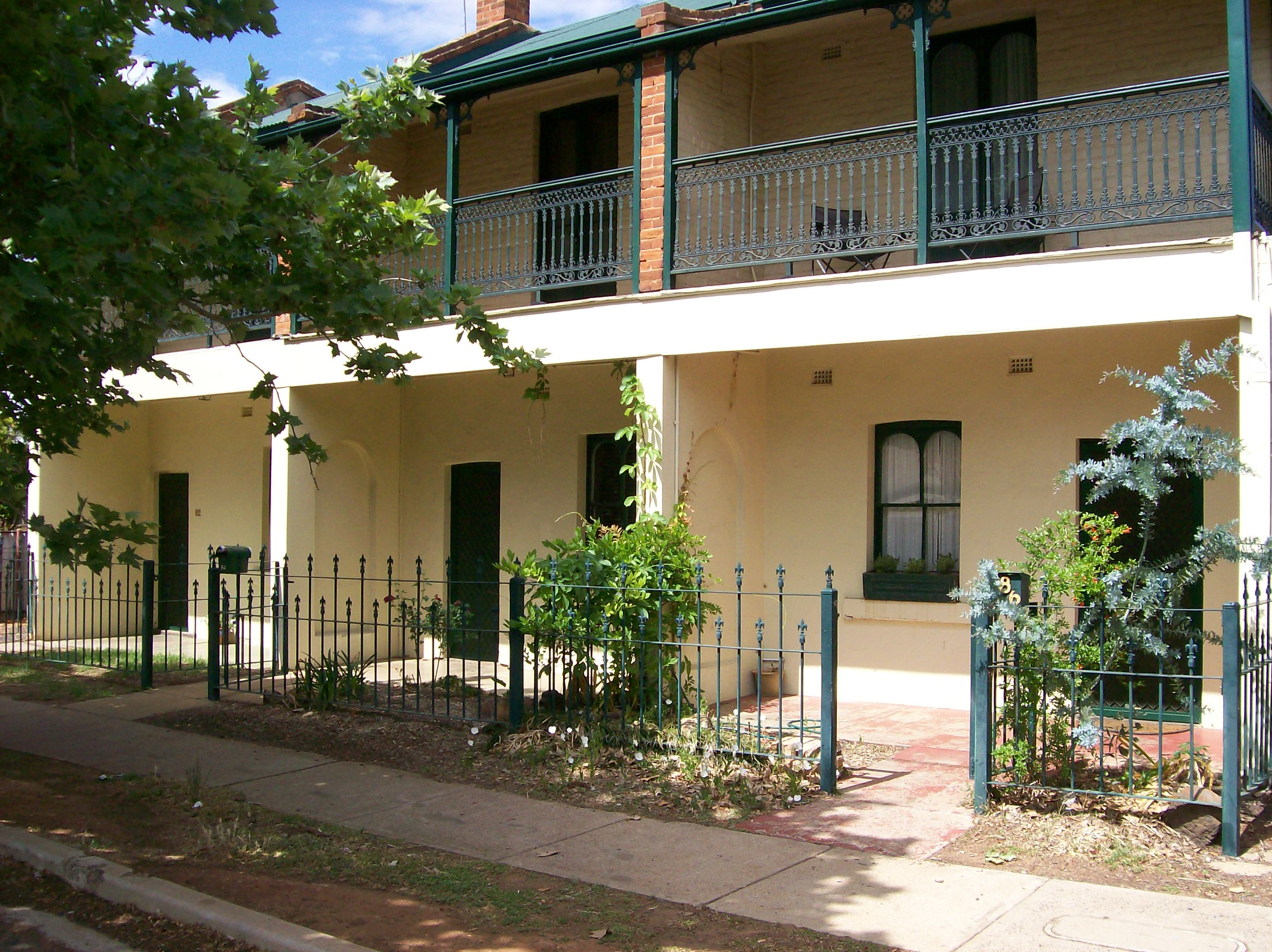
Victorian Terraces

== Transport ==
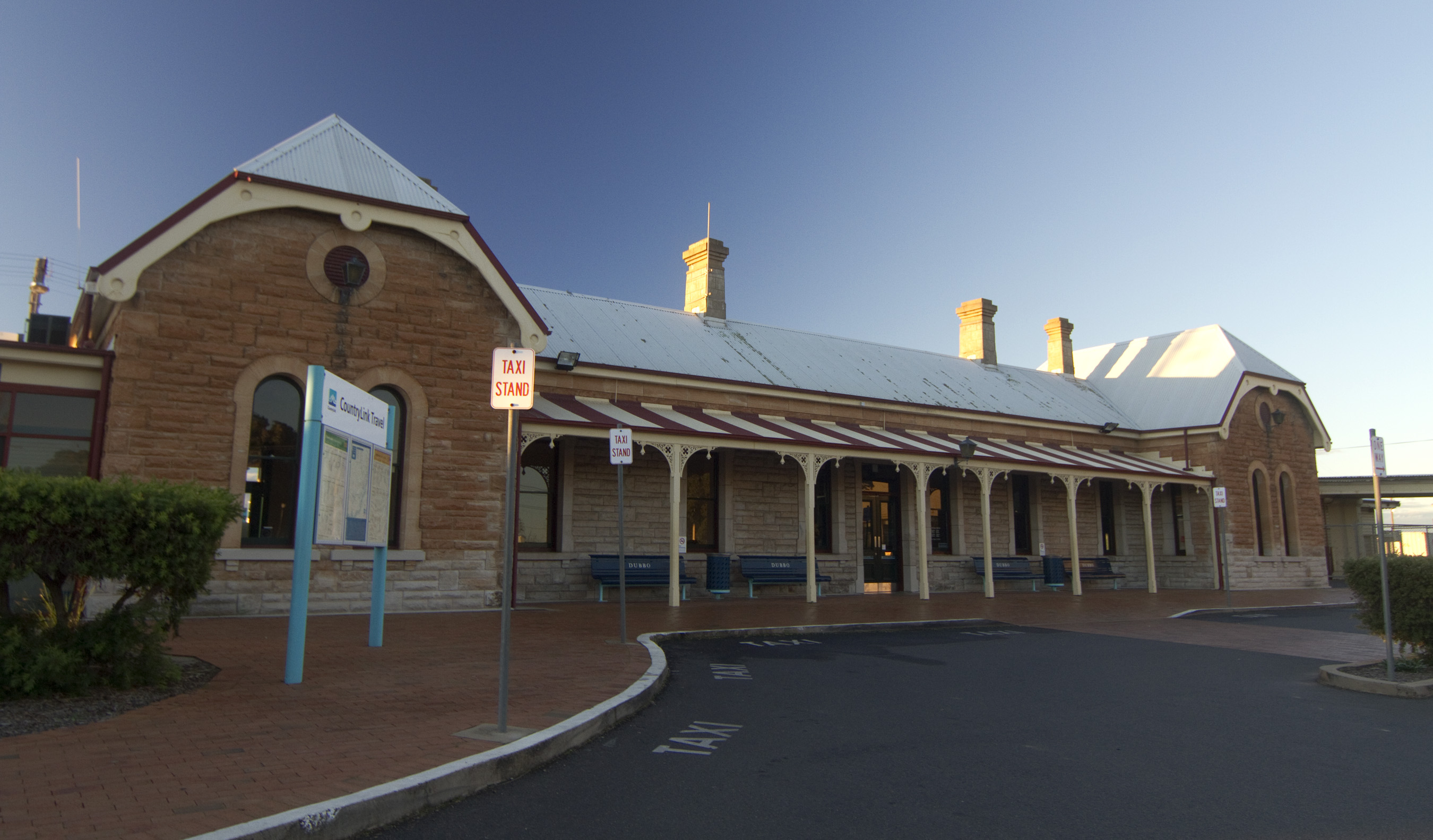
Dubbo railway station

Dubbo railway station lies on the Main Western railway line between Sydney and Bourke and opened in 1881. The station is the terminus for the daily NSW TrainLink Central West XPT service from Sydney with connecting road coach services to Broken Hill, Bourke, Cootamundra, Lightning Ridge, Nyngan and Tamworth. The Mindyarra Maintenance Centre is scheduled to open 700 metres to the east of the station in the mid-2020s, as the home depot for the NSW TrainLink Regional Train fleet.

Dubbo Buslines operates services within the city. BusBiz operates coach services under contract to NSW TrainLink and maintains a depot in the city.

Dubbo Regional Airport has flights to Sydney (QantasLink, Rex Airlines), Newcastle (FlyPelican), Canberra (FlyPelican) and other small outback New South Wales towns (Air Link).

== Media ==
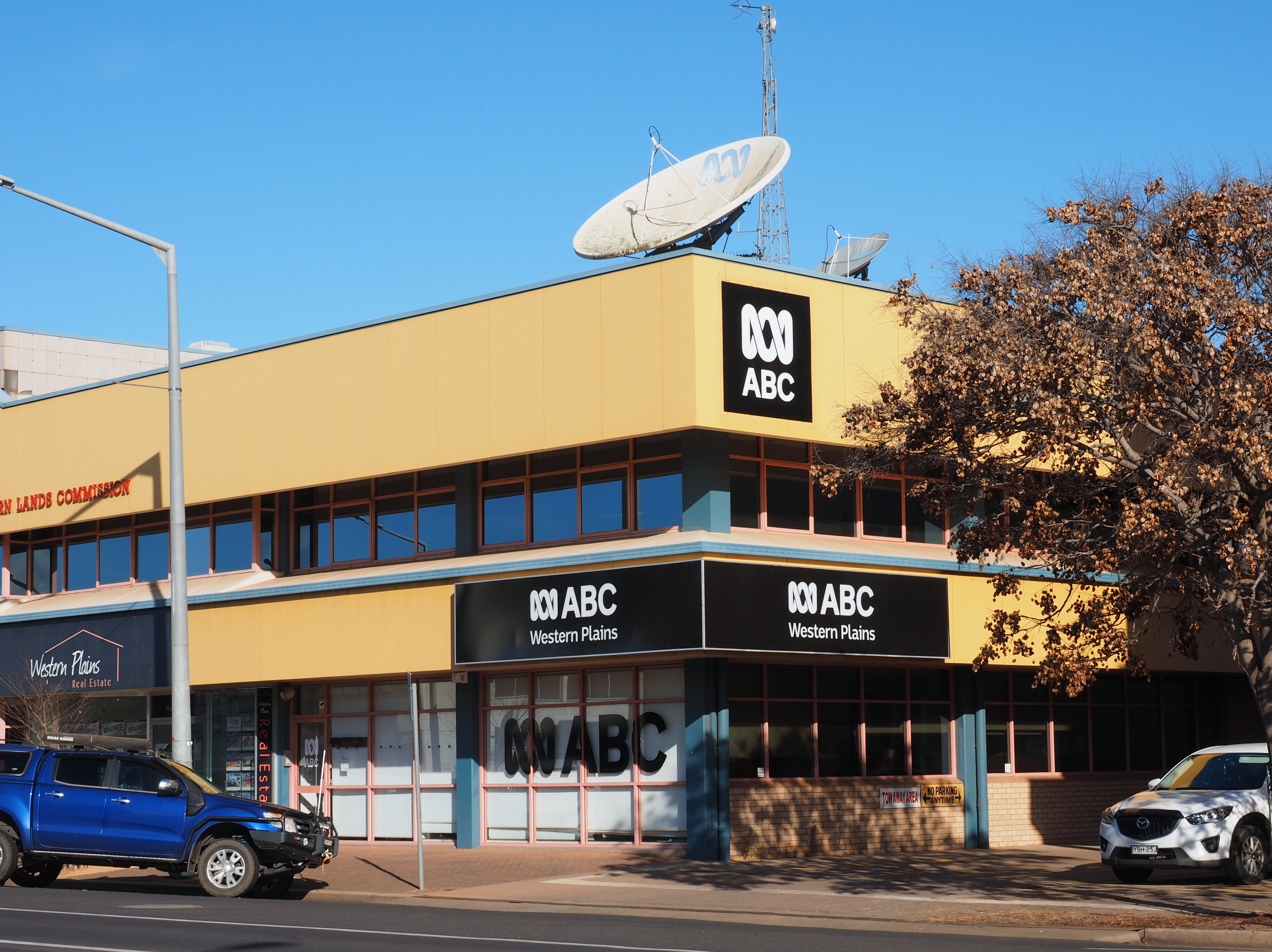
The ABC Western Plains offices in Dubbo

Local print media include:

- The Daily Liberal
- The Weekly Dubbo Photo News

Three commercially licensed radio stations broadcast in the city:

- Triple M broadcasts on FM 93.5, playing rock music.
- 2DU – a local heritage station, it broadcasts on AM 1251.
- Zoo FM – a rock music station, it broadcasts on FM 92.7.

ABC Radio also has a studio in the city: ABC Western Plains, local news and talk on 95.9FM.

ABC Radio broadcasts five services to the Dubbo area: ABC Local, ABC Radio National, Triple J, ABC Classic, and ABC NewsRadio.

The city also has narrowcast stations on 90.3 FM Racing Radio, a tourist radio station and a country music station. The city has two community stations: DCFM 88.9 Dubbo community radio, and Rhema FM, which broadcasts Christian music.

The Dubbo area is served by five television stations. In common with all Australian TV stations, they now broadcast digital transmissions only, with the primary program in each case being designated as:

- Seven (formerly branded as Prime7 and Prime Television), 7two, 7mate, 7Bravo, 7flix – an owned and operated station by the Seven Network since 2022 and formerly a Seven Network affiliate.
- Network 10, 10 Drama, 10 Comedy, Nickelodeon – an owned and operated station by Network 10
- WIN Television's Nine, 9Go!, 9Gem, 9Life – an affiliate of the Nine Network
- ABC TV – ABC, ABC Family, ABC Kids, ABC Entertains, ABC News
- SBS Television – SBS, SBS2, SBS World Movies, SBS WorldWatch, SBS Food, NITV

Seven (formerly branded as Prime7 and Prime Television) and WIN Television both produce half-hour-long local news bulletins. Seven News (formerly Prime7 News and Prime News) screens at 6 pm, while WIN News screens at 5:30 pm from Monday to Friday. Nine News Central West was an hour-long bulletin that mixed local and national news, broadcast on the Southern Cross Austereo primary channel, when it was a Nine affiliate.

Subscription Television services are provided by Foxtel.

== Sport and recreation ==
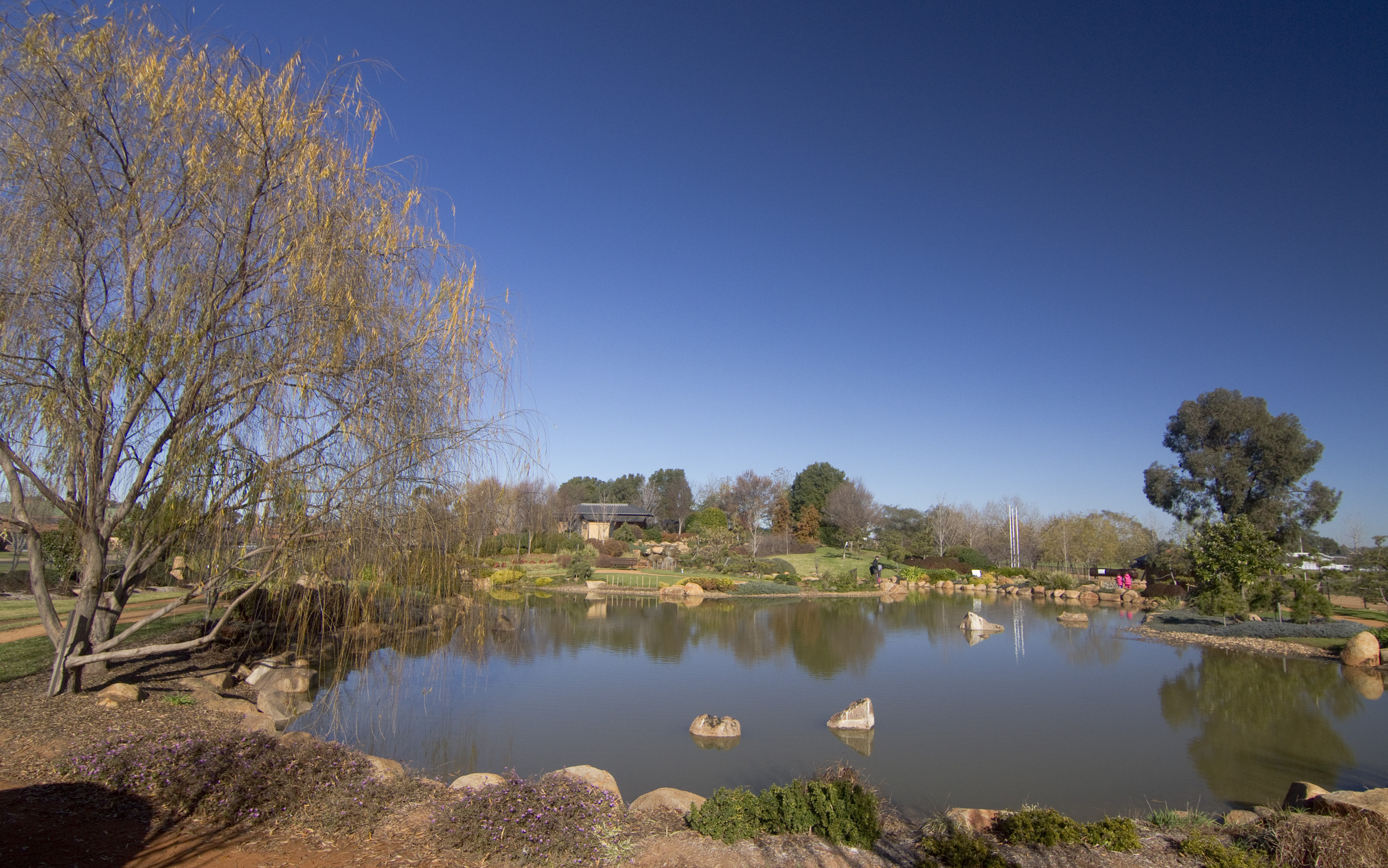
Dubbo Botanical Garden

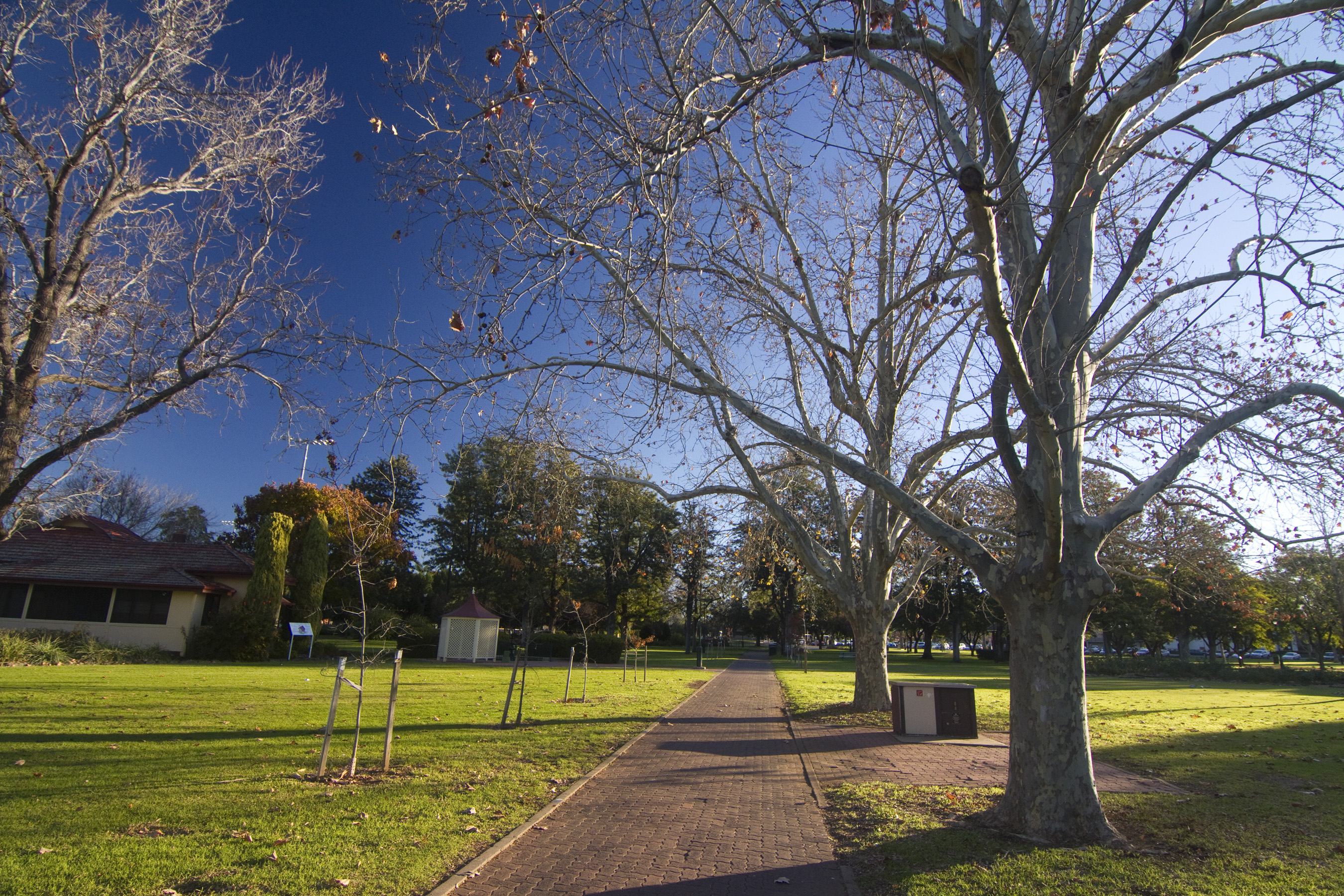
Victoria Park

Sports play a big role in Dubbo's community life. Rugby league is popular in Dubbo. Two teams compete in the Group 11 Rugby League – the Dubbo CYMS and Dubbo Macquarie Raiders. The city also has an Australian rules football team, the Dubbo Demons, who were premiers in the Central West Australian Football League in 2007. Two rugby union teams are active, the Dubbo Kangaroos (Roos) and the Dubbo Rhinos, which compete in the Central West Rugby competition, the Blowes Clothing Cup.

Dubbo Junior Cricket Association conducts cricket for over 500 children aged between 5 and 16 during October to March and also conducts first-, second-, and third-grade competitions during this time.

Dubbo has a turf club, which incorporates a pony club and horse racing, and organises shows and gymkhana. Ultimate Frisbee is a new sport to the town and is rapidly growing in popularity.

The Dubbo Ultimate Frisbee Federation (DUFF) is the local Ultimate club and organises a local league and the Dubbo Meerkats Mixed rep side. The Dubbo Rams compete in the men's and women's NSW State Basketball Leagues. Netball is also popular in Dubbo with competitions every weekend for all age groups during netball season at the Nita McGrath netball courts near the Macquarie River in Central Dubbo. Dubbo has a large Junior and Senior Hockey Association with representative teams for all ages, while also participating in the Premier League Hockey Competition in both the Men's (Dubbo Lions) and Women's (Dubbo Blue Jays). Soccer is very popular, particularly among children. Dubbo has its own all-age men's and women's competition and has three teams – Dubbo FC Bulls, Westside Panthers, and Orana Spurs, which compete in the Western Premier League. Dubbo also has one of the only 10-lane pools outside of Sydney in NSW, the Dubbo Aquatic and Leisure Centre. The centre hosts meets through the Western Swimming Association (and affiliated clubs Dubbo City Swimtech and Orana Aquatic) and school carnivals.

Dubbo's Caltex Park hosted the annual City vs Country Origin match in 2006, with an attendance of 11,423, and in 2014, with an attendance of more than 9,600 in rainy conditions.

In 2007, Dubbo hosted the Junior World Orienteering Championships with most of the events held in the granite outcrops of the nearby Sappa Bulga Range. From this event, the orienteering club Western Plains Orienteers was born. Other sports popular in Dubbo include lawn bowls, via the huge variety of bowling clubs, and golf (on Dubbo's 27-hole golf course).

In 2022, Dubbo hosted the NSWPSSA Boys Cricket State Championships. The competition took place in Victoria Park, and Lady Cutler Fields 1–5.

Named for a famous blacktracker, the Tracker Riley bike path is part of a 12.5-km walking and cycling loop along the Macquarie River.

The Dubbo Stampede is an annual running festival held in Dubbo. It features multiple distances, including a 5.3km, 10km, half marathon and marathon. It is typically held on Father's Day in September each year.

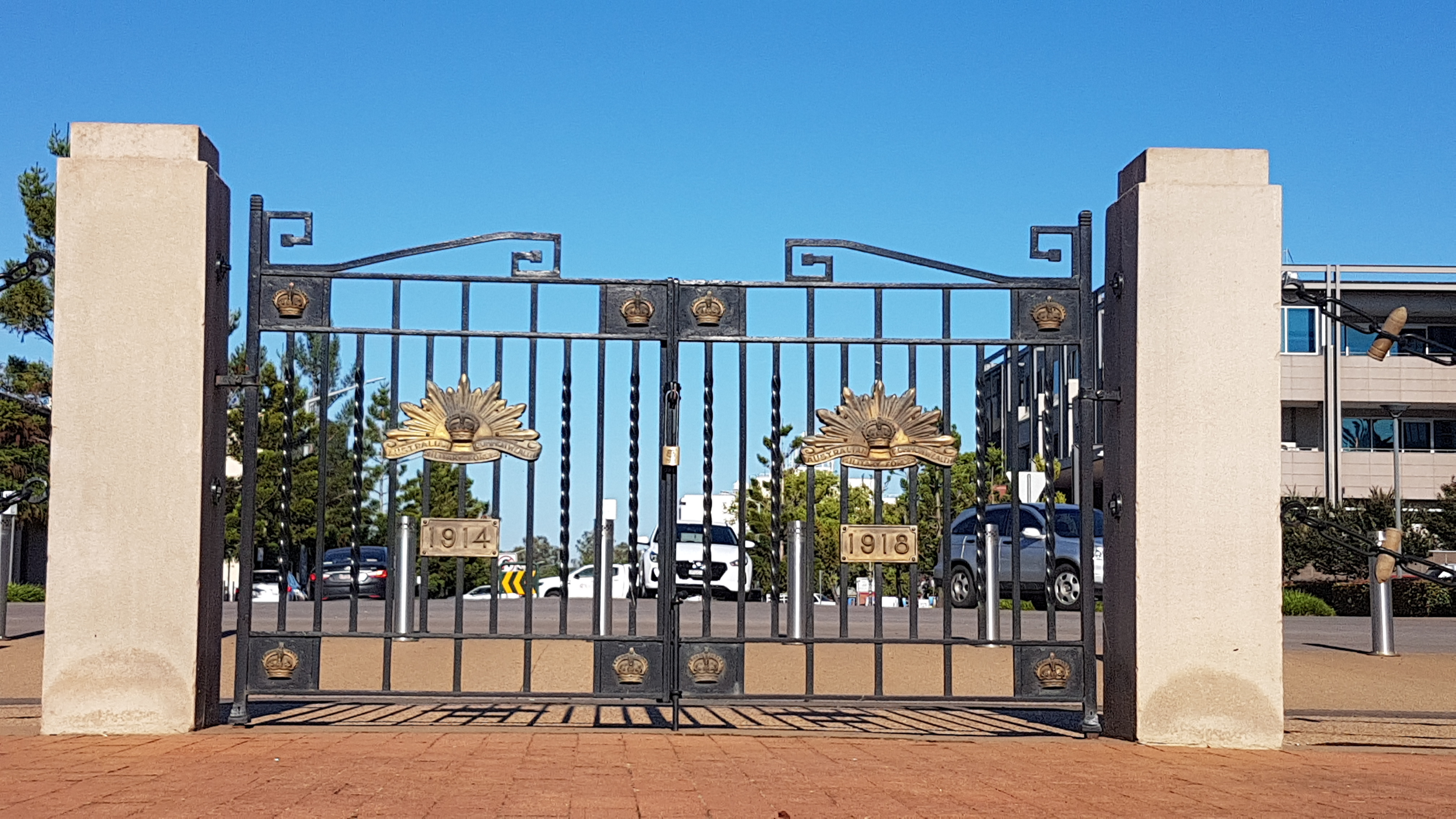
WWI Memorial gates

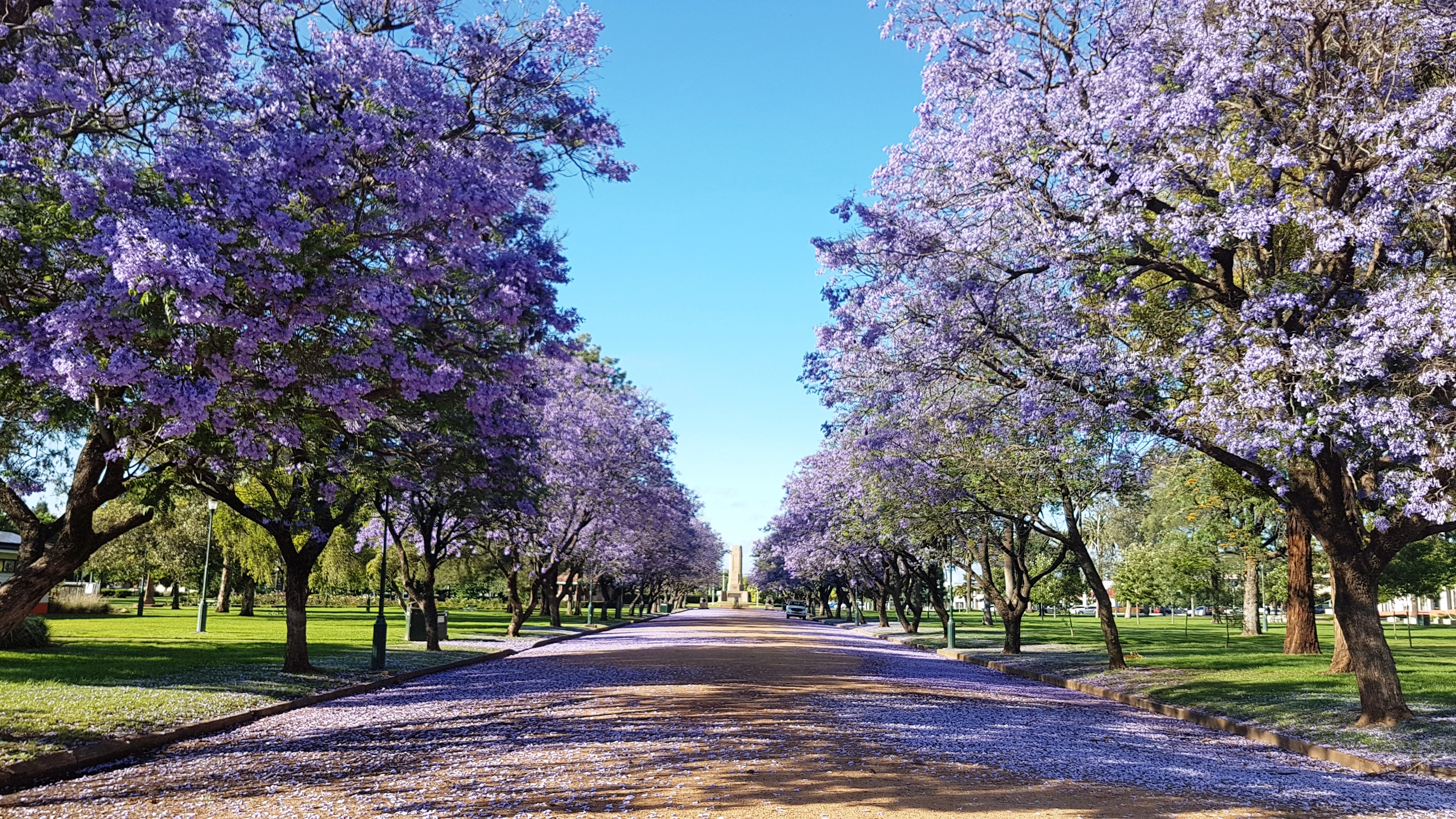
Avenue of jacarandas

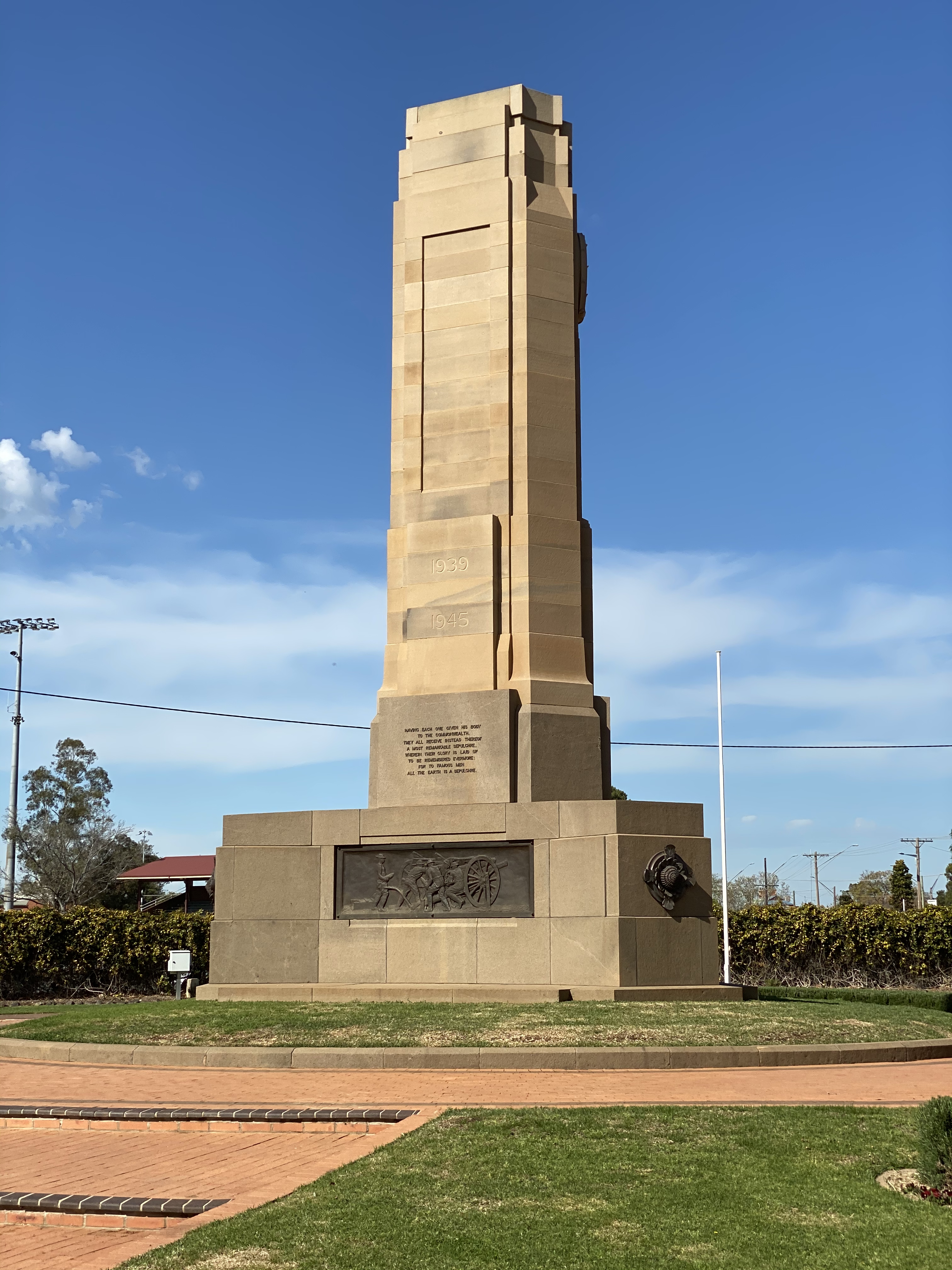
WWII Memorial

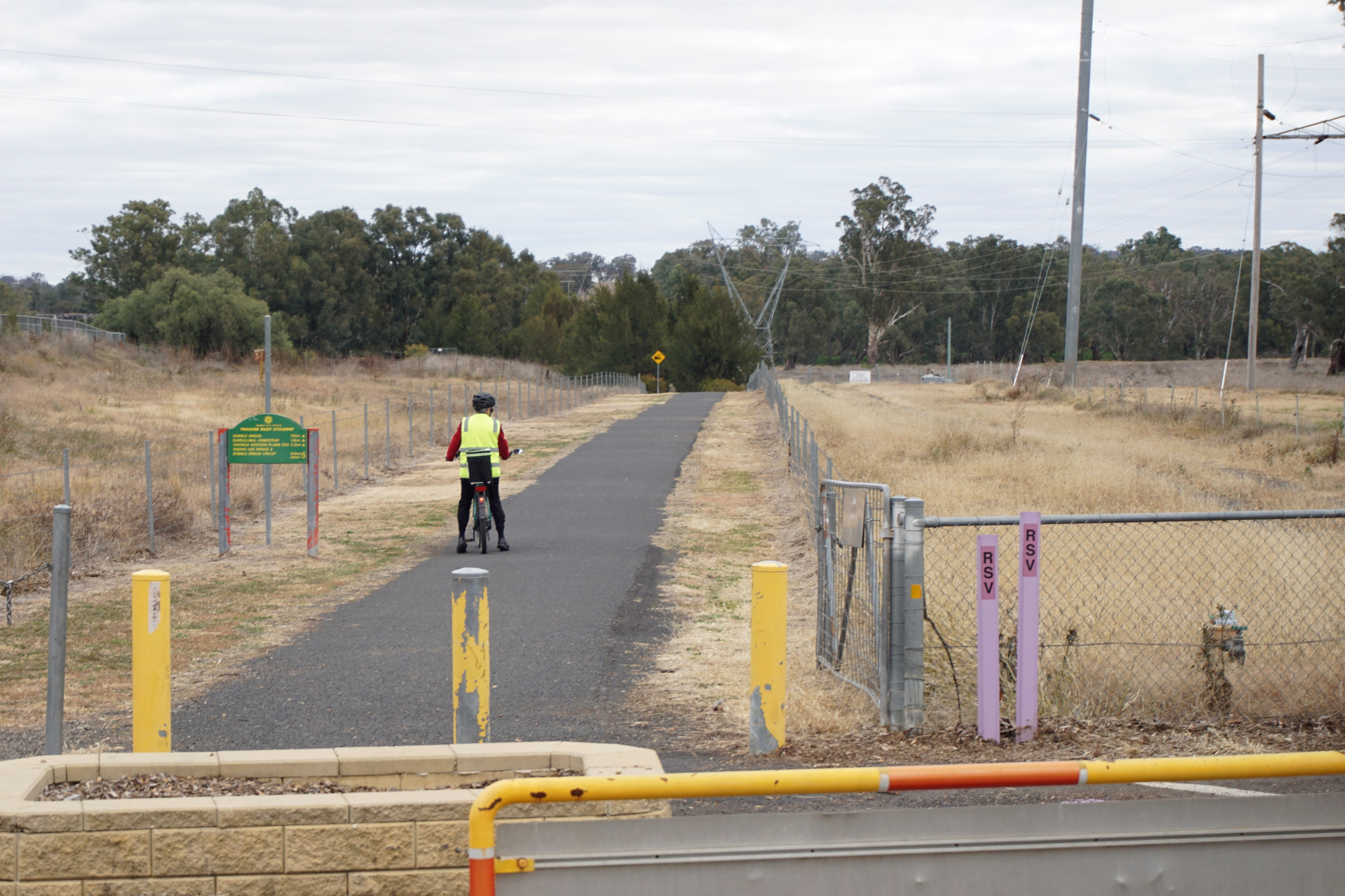
Start of Tracker Riley cycle path

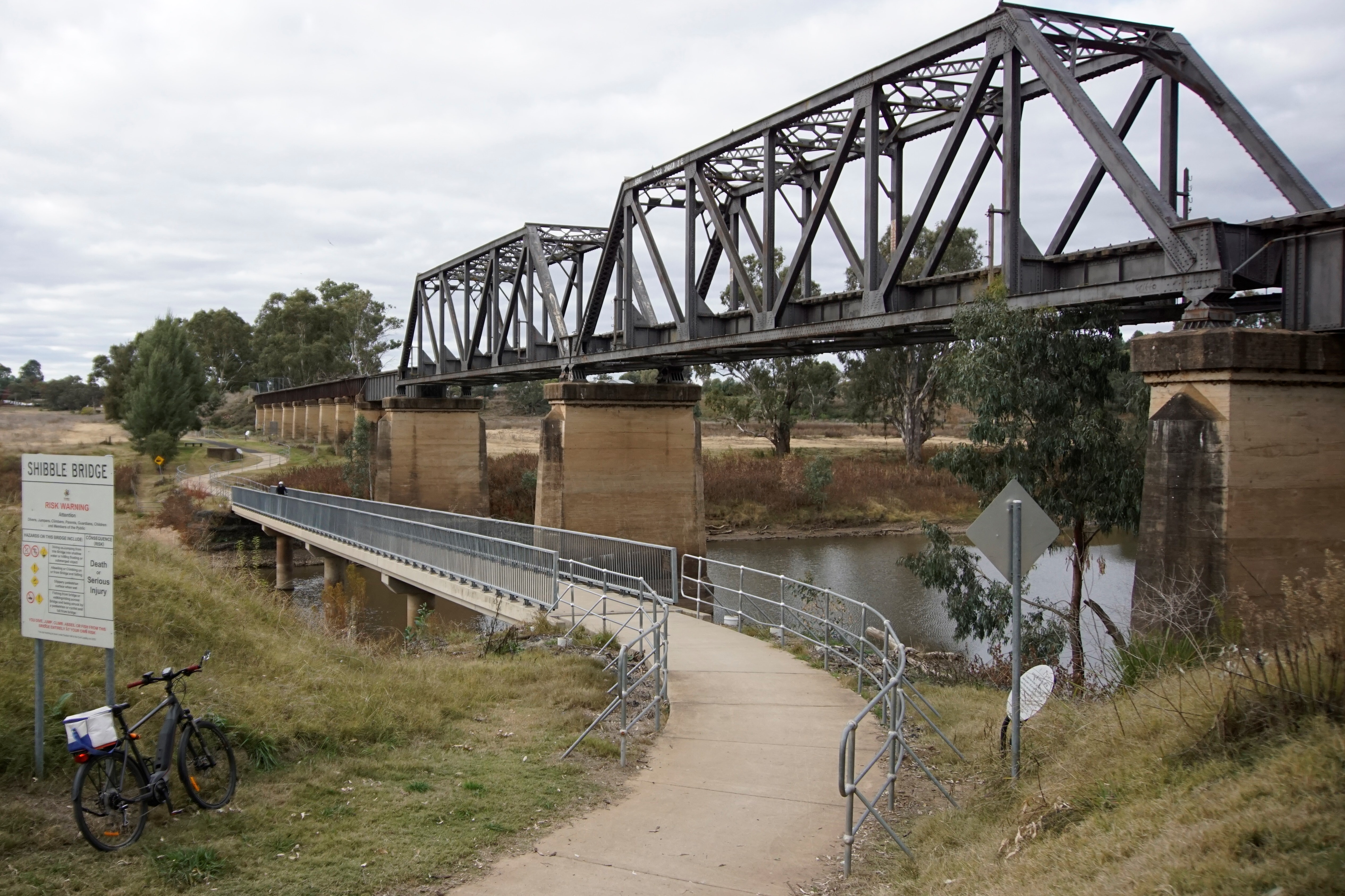
Shibble Bridge, Tracker Riley cycleway

== Notable people ==
- Kirsty Lee Allan, actress, Australian drama series Sea Patrol
- Frederick William Bamford (1849–1934), politician
- Daniel Barber, track cyclist
- Marion Hall Best, interior designer
- Braidon Burns, rugby league player for the Canterbury Bulldogs
- Matt Burton, rugby league player for the Canterbury Bulldogs
- Brandon Costin, former NRL player
- Les Davidson, former NRL international
- Megan Dunn, cyclist winning two gold in the 2010 Delhi Commonwealth Games
- Kaide Ellis, rugby league player, St. George Illawarra Dragons
- Tyler Everingham, racing driver
- Bill Ferguson, Aboriginal leader, organiser of 1938 Day of Mourning protest
- Isobelle Mary Ferguson, Aboriginal nurse and activist
- Lizzy Gardiner, costume designer
- Luke Garner, second row for NRL Club Penrith Panthers
- Pearl Gibbs (1901–1983), Aboriginal leader, lived and died in Dubbo
- Margaret Packham Hargrave, writer, poet, local poultry farmer, wrote for Daily Liberal
- Ella Havelka (born 1989), first Indigenous person to join The Australian Ballet
- Bob Hewitt (born 1940), tennis player and convicted rapist
- Bill Hornadge (1918–2013), journalist, author, publisher and founder of Seven Seas Stamps, Dubbo
- Geoffrey Lancaster, international concert pianist
- Jean Lee, the last woman officially executed in Australia, in 1951
- Kate Leigh, Australian gangster
- Adrian Leijer, Australian international soccer player
- Ben McCalman, Australian rugby union player (Western Force, Wallabies)
- Glenn McGrath, Australian international cricketer, born in Dubbo and raised in Narromine
- Amy Mills, Australian Deaflympic gold medallist
- Billy Noke, former NRL player
- Kyle Noke, international MMA fighter, UFC fighter
- Dean Pay, former NRL international and coach, grew up and retired in Dubbo
- David Peachey, former NRL player
- Steve Peacocke, actor, Home and Away
- Luke Priddis, former NRL player
- The Reels, 1980s pop band, including Craig Hooper, Dave Mason
- Andrew Ryan, former NRL player, current ABC Radio Grandstand Rugby League sideline expert
- Jean Emile Serisier, Dubbo's first businessman
- Mark Soden, former NRL player
- Robert Adam Spears (1893–1950), professional cyclist
- Nicole Sykes, Australian International soccer player, and captain for Canberra United
- Ashleigh Sykes, Australian International soccer player
- Thirsty Merc, Australian rock band
- Barrie Unsworth, 36th Premier of New South Wales
- Greg Warren, NSW Labor Party State MP and Parliamentary Secretary
- Isaah Yeo, rugby league player, co-captain of the Penrith Panthers
- Justin Yeo, former NRL player

== See also ==
- City of Dubbo (former local government area)
- Electoral district of Dubbo
- Orana (New South Wales)
