= List of watercourses in Western Australia, T–V =

Western Australia has many watercourses with gazetted names, including rivers, streams, brooks, creeks, gullies, anabranches and backwaters.

This list is complete with respect to the 1996 Gazetteer of Australia. Dubious names have been checked against the online 2004 data, and in all cases confirmed correct. However, if any watercourses have been gazetted or deleted since 1996, this list does not reflect these changes. Strictly speaking, Australian place names are gazetted in capital letters only; the names in this list have been converted to mixed case in accordance with normal capitalisation conventions. Locations are as gazetted; some watercourses may extend over long distances.

== T ==
| Name | Latitude | Longitude | Remarks |
|---|---|---|---|
| Tabba Tabba Creek | 20° 22' 22" S | 118° 56' 40" E | |
| Tableland Creek | 23° 11' 18" S | 117° 42' 18" E | |
| Tadarida Creek | 15° 5' 42" S | 126° 57' 34" E | |
| Taits Vale | 10° 30' 53" S | 105° 37' 21" E | |
| Takalarup Creek | 34° 37' 42" S | 118° 3' 8" E | |
| Takenup Creek | 34° 48' 4" S | 118° 1' 3" E | |
| Talawana Creek | 22° 49' 33" S | 121° 8' 25" E | |
| Talbot Brook | 32° 10' 5" S | 116° 49' 40" E | |
| Talbot Creek | 16° 50' 29" S | 124° 54' 47" E | |
| Talga River | 20° 55' 46" S | 119° 50' 9" E | |
| Tamar Gully | 34° 7' 57" S | 116° 31' 51" E | |
| Tambina Creek | 21° 35' 29" S | 119° 19' 31" E | |
| Tambourah Creek | 21° 40' 6" S | 119° 19' 57" E | |
| Tanbarmering Gully | 32° 35' 8" S | 117° 48' 15" E | |
| Tanberry Creek | 21° 35' 4" S | 117° 35' 55" E | |
| Tanga Tanga Creek | 21° 20' 15" S | 116° 13' 43" E | |
| Tanguin Creek | 21° 11' 36" S | 121° 0' 48" E | |
| Tanjanerup Brook | 33° 57' 23" S | 115° 46' 47" E | |
| Tanjinup Brook | 33° 59' 2" S | 116° 16' 52" E | |
| Tanmurra Creek | 15° 4' 8" S | 128° 33' 31" E | |
| Tantabiddi Creek | 21° 54' 52" S | 113° 58' 40" E | |
| Tarcunyah Creek | 22° 21' 23" S | 121° 42' 1" E | |
| Targian Creek | 30° 21' 15" S | 116° 8' 17" E | |
| Tarn River | 33° 10' 28" S | 117° 13' 53" E | |
| Tarraji River | 16° 43' 27" S | 124° 4' 51" E | |
| Tarup Creek | 33° 46' 15" S | 116° 58' 50" E | |
| Tate Gully | 32° 36' 39" S | 115° 52' 17" E | |
| Tathire Creek | 26° 3' 58" S | 116° 8' 48" E | |
| Taurawydgee Creek | 29° 7' 56" S | 117° 19' 59" E | |
| Taylor Creek | 21° 44' 38" S | 120° 10' 11" E | |
| Taylor Gully | 33° 5' 7" S | 115° 56' 18" E | |
| Tchugareywurdoo Creek | 23° 15' 0" S | 114° 40' 28" E | |
| Tea Tree Creek | 17° 2' 51" S | 128° 34' 53" E | |
| Tea Tree Creek | 17° 56' 57" S | 127° 50' 10" E | |
| Tea-tree Creek | 16° 25' 10" S | 128° 47' 13" E | |
| Telegraph Creek | 16° 50' 56" S | 128° 19' 19" E | |
| Telfer River | 23° 5' 32" S | 115° 41' 14" E | |
| Telfer Creek West | 23° 13' 38" S | 115° 36' 42" E | |
| Tellarup Brook | 34° 13' 29" S | 116° 14' 17" E | |
| Terminal Creek | 20° 48' 27" S | 115° 27' 1" E | |
| Terrella Creek | 21° 49' 55" S | 121° 0' 48" E | |
| Tessie Creek | 15° 38' 31" S | 128° 41' 14" E | |
| Thanda Creek | 27° 56' 59" S | 116° 23' 58" E | |
| Thomas River | 24° 43' 38" S | 116° 15' 0" E | |
| Thomas River | 33° 51' 33" S | 123° 0' 48" E | |
| Thompson Creek | 18° 29' 29" S | 127° 31' 46" E | |
| Thompson River | 14° 57' 49" S | 128° 6' 38" E | |
| Thomson Brook | 33° 33' 52" S | 115° 52' 46" E | |
| Thomson Brook South | 33° 37' 6" S | 115° 54' 43" E | |
| Throssell River | 17° 29' 36" S | 126° 3' 8" E | |
| Thunindiwah Gully | 28° 39' 37" S | 115° 31' 48" E | |
| Thurraguddy Creek | 25° 56' 25" S | 121° 59' 27" E | |
| Thursday Creek | 16° 56' 8" S | 128° 42' 30" E | |
| Thursday Creek | 18° 6' 22" S | 127° 6' 51" E | |
| Ti Tree Gully | 33° 59' 7" S | 116° 10' 23" E | |
| Tieraco Creek | 26° 24' 52" S | 118° 6' 31" E | |
| Tiger Gully | 33° 37' 28" S | 115° 35' 2" E | |
| Tigertrap Gully | 28° 44' 43" S | 123° 41' 7" E | |
| Tilly Gully | 26° 39' 17" S | 115° 43' 12" E | |
| Timber Creek | 19° 3' 52" S | 125° 33' 55" E | |
| Tims Creek | 16° 12' 51" S | 125° 10' 5" E | |
| Tin Dog Creek | 31° 15' 16" S | 117° 2' 56" E | |
| Tincurring Creek | 33° 5' 16" S | 117° 51' 52" E | |
| Tingelup Gully | 34° 35' 47" S | 117° 51' 59" E | |
| Tingun Creek | 14° 20' 15" S | 126° 38' 41" E | |
| Tinkelelup Creek | 34° 40' 4" S | 118° 30' 1" E | |
| Tinkers Brook | 34° 23' 36" S | 116° 22' 30" E | |
| Tinks Creek | 31° 36' 5" S | 116° 31' 23" E | |
| Tippetts Creek | 17° 18' 7" S | 126° 18' 20" E | |
| Tjulyurulyuru Creek | 21° 3' 45" S | 127° 54' 15" E | |
| Todd Creek | 16° 4' 40" S | 127° 43' 7" E | |
| Tom Hill Brook | 34° 14' 39" S | 115° 45' 27" E | |
| Tomahawk Creek | 16° 42' 44" S | 125° 24' 57" E | |
| Tomalockin Creek | 31° 38' 34" S | 117° 17' 19" E | |
| Tommy Creek | 15° 58' 22" S | 127° 13' 32" E | |
| Tommyhawk Creek | 22° 5' 44" S | 120° 43' 26" E | |
| Tone River | 34° 24' 3" S | 116° 25' 25" E | |
| Tong Creek | 25° 43' 55" S | 120° 55' 16" E | |
| Tongololo Creek | 22° 5' 50" S | 121° 8' 32" E | |
| Tooartup Creek | 33° 59' 7" S | 119° 24' 22" E | |
| Toodyay Brook | 31° 17' 59" S | 116° 29' 20" E | |
| Toolunga Creek | 21° 57' 8" S | 115° 39' 44" E | |
| Toothawarra Creek | 22° 45' 36" S | 114° 3' 32" E | |
| Torradup River | 33° 51' 40" S | 121° 0' 48" E | |
| Towarr Creek | 26° 13' 16" S | 117° 13' 51" E | |
| Towerlup Brook | 34° 12' 39" S | 116° 59' 55" E | |
| Townshend River | 16° 45' 3" S | 123° 59' 22" E | |
| Tractor Creek | 16° 26' 21" S | 125° 34' 2" E | |
| Traine River | 17° 20' 3" S | 126° 18' 11" E | |
| Tramway Creek | 32° 49' 59" S | 115° 56' 4" E | |
| Treen Brook | 34° 27' 13" S | 115° 58' 33" E | |
| Treendale Gully | 33° 17' 50" S | 115° 45' 2" E | |
| Tren Creek | 33° 31' 37" S | 115° 33' 39" E | |
| Trent River | 16° 33' 56" S | 123° 36' 54" E | |
| Trevarton Creek | 21° 15' 31" S | 115° 54' 46" E | |
| Triberton Creek | 21° 44' 30" S | 119° 44' 2" E | |
| Trim Creek | 27° 44' 28" S | 126° 4' 23" E | |
| Tripally Creek | 31° 32' 44" S | 116° 49' 55" E | |
| Troy Creek | 25° 30' 30" S | 121° 12' 9" E | |
| Tullewa Creek | 17° 26' 17" S | 126° 49' 2" E | |
| Tulmulnga Creek | 16° 43' 44" S | 125° 1' 52" E | |
| Tumlo Brook | 32° 58' 2" S | 116° 11' 5" E | |
| Tunkawanna Creek | 21° 40' 8" S | 117° 28' 48" E | |
| Tunnel Creek | 17° 35' 25" S | 124° 58' 46" E | |
| Tunnel Creek | 17° 40' 38" S | 125° 16' 51" E | |
| Tunnel Creek | 24° 6' 53" S | 118° 24' 24" E | |
| Tunney Creek | 34° 4' 52" S | 117° 20' 44" E | |
| Tura Brook | 27° 27' 13" S | 116° 56' 27" E | |
| Turee Creek | 23° 34' 1" S | 117° 24' 26" E | |
| Turee Creek East | 23° 18' 47" S | 118° 2' 11" E | |
| Turkey Camp Creek | 20° 41' 38" S | 119° 2' 13" E | |
| Turkey Cock Gully | 32° 12' 50" S | 116° 59' 16" E | |
| Turkey Creek | 16° 49' 35" S | 128° 21' 41" E | |
| Turkey Creek | 24° 6' 6" S | 118° 20' 19" E | |
| Turkey Creek | 16° 49' 45" S | 125° 38' 51" E | |
| Turkey Creek | 28° 29' 53" S | 120° 58' 32" E | |
| Turkey Creek | 17° 9' 21" S | 128° 13' 9" E | |
| Turner Brook | 34° 16' 32" S | 115° 3' 2" E | |
| Turner Creek | 25° 0' 13" S | 118° 15' 1" E | |
| Turner Gully | 32° 17' 35" S | 116° 43' 24" E | |
| Turner River | 20° 22' 31" S | 118° 21' 54" E | |
| Turner River | 17° 45' 0" S | 128° 21' 16" E | |
| Turner River East | 20° 39' 41" S | 118° 32' 51" E | |
| Turner River West | 21° 3' 11" S | 118° 41' 2" E | |
| Turnwood Creek | 34° 15' 41" S | 115° 10' 18" E | |
| Turtle Brook | 32° 9' 8" S | 116° 7' 13" E | |
| Tutawa Gully | 28° 17' 20" S | 115° 38' 43" E | |
| Twakerup Brook | 34° 27' 2" S | 116° 27' 58" E | |
| Tweed River | 33° 56' 49" S | 116° 23' 11" E | |
| Twertatup Creek | 33° 38' 29" S | 119° 53' 40" E | |
| Twertup Creek | 34° 0' 11" S | 119° 24' 57" E | |
| Twin Rocks Creek | 21° 32' 14" S | 119° 35' 38" E | |
| Twinems Bend | 34° 13' 53" S | 115° 13' 27" E | |
| Two Camel Creek | 21° 36' 59" S | 118° 43' 20" E | |
| Twolganup Brook | 33° 59' 44" S | 117° 55' 24" E | |
| Tyson Creek | 18° 1' 28" S | 128° 35' 2" E | |

== U ==
| Name | Latitude | Longitude | Remarks |
|---|---|---|---|
| Uannup Brook | 34° 13' 44" S | 117° 11' 30" E | |
| Ubach Creek | 14° 16' 21" S | 126° 50' 57" E | |
| Udumung Brook | 31° 10' 28" S | 116° 3' 9" E | |
| Ullala Creek | 15° 5' 4" S | 127° 41' 39" E | |
| Ullinger River | 16° 27' 39" S | 127° 26' 46" E | |
| Ulura Creek | 24° 8' 37" S | 115° 29' 27" E | |
| Umba Creek | 25° 11' 35" S | 116° 13' 10" E | |
| Una Brook | 34° 43' 51" S | 116° 12' 35" E | |
| Una Brook | 28° 44' 48" S | 114° 43' 40" E | |
| Ungoorari Creek | 15° 7' 41" S | 127° 48' 3" E | |
| Unndiup Creek | 35° 1' 47" S | 117° 40' 14" E | |
| Upper Chapman Brook | 34° 4' 54" S | 115° 11' 12" E | |
| Upper Chapman Brook | 33° 59' 24" S | 115° 14' 5" E | |
| Upper Panton River | 17° 52' 43" S | 127° 50' 39" E | |
| Urala Creek | 21° 52' 26" S | 114° 40' 37" E | |
| Uralla Creek | 17° 58' 36" S | 124° 15' 34" E | |
| Uralla Creek | 18° 1' 47" S | 124° 16' 30" E | |
| Uramurdah Creek | 26° 42' 25" S | 120° 20' 24" E | |
| Urandy Creek | 22° 35' 54" S | 115° 52' 58" E | |
| Urary Creek | 23° 37' 0" S | 117° 38' 26" E | |
| Urawa River | 28° 13' 26" S | 115° 29' 7" E | |
| Urina Creek | 28° 8' 31" S | 114° 22' 40" E | |
| Urinarr Creek | 15° 11' 29" S | 127° 47' 15" E | |
| Urquhart Creek | 17° 4' 18" S | 126° 6' 42" E | |

== V ==
| Name | Latitude | Longitude | Remarks |
|---|---|---|---|
| Valentine Creek | 15° 43' 14" S | 128° 40' 14" E | |
| Vanadium Creek | 21° 8' 36" S | 120° 58' 52" E | |
| Vasse River | 33° 43' 1" S | 115° 21' 34" E | |
| Venn Creek | 22° 35' 7" S | 114° 21' 4" E | |
| Veryiuca Brook | 33° 50' 10" S | 114° 59' 34" E | |
| Vickers Creek | 27° 47' 52" S | 121° 38' 51" E | |
| Victory Creek | 28° 32' 45" S | 120° 58' 55" E | |
| Vince Brook | 32° 45' 32" S | 116° 3' 11" E | |
| Vineyard Creek | 31° 27' 30" S | 116° 25' 3" E | |
| Violet Brook | 33° 38' 49" S | 115° 49' 7" E | |
| Violet Creek | 24° 54' 31" S | 113° 39' 28" E | |
| Virgin Creek | 18° 33' 1" S | 125° 50' 29" E | |
