= Troy Creek =

Coordinates: 32.22806°S 148.62736°E

Troy Creek catchment is a small area of land to the north-east of the city of Dubbo (pop 38,000), central western New South Wales, Australia. The catchment is noted for its significant record levels of past salinity. An ephemeral stream originating from the remnant vegetation Beni forest to the east flowing approximately 10 kilometres via Troy Gully north-west through grazing land, heavy residential, industrial and terminating into the Macquarie River system.

== History ==
Various land uses such as significant clearing of the catchment has resulted in significant salinity, an issue where it soil and water table below becomes salt laden. Troy Creek has suffered significant scalding and vegetation loss as a direct result of salinity. Sections within the catchment have recorded soil salt levels twice that of sea water and over ten times tolerable to native grass and tree species.

Local land care volunteers, businesses, and school students have planted thousands of trees in Troy Gully (upstream of Yarrandale Rd.) and Troy Creek to lower the water table. Salinity has significantly declined in recent years. Salt scalds are being grown over by salt tolerant grass species, and measurable levels in the ground water have lowered markedly.
