= Daily Liberal =

Weekly newspaper in Australia

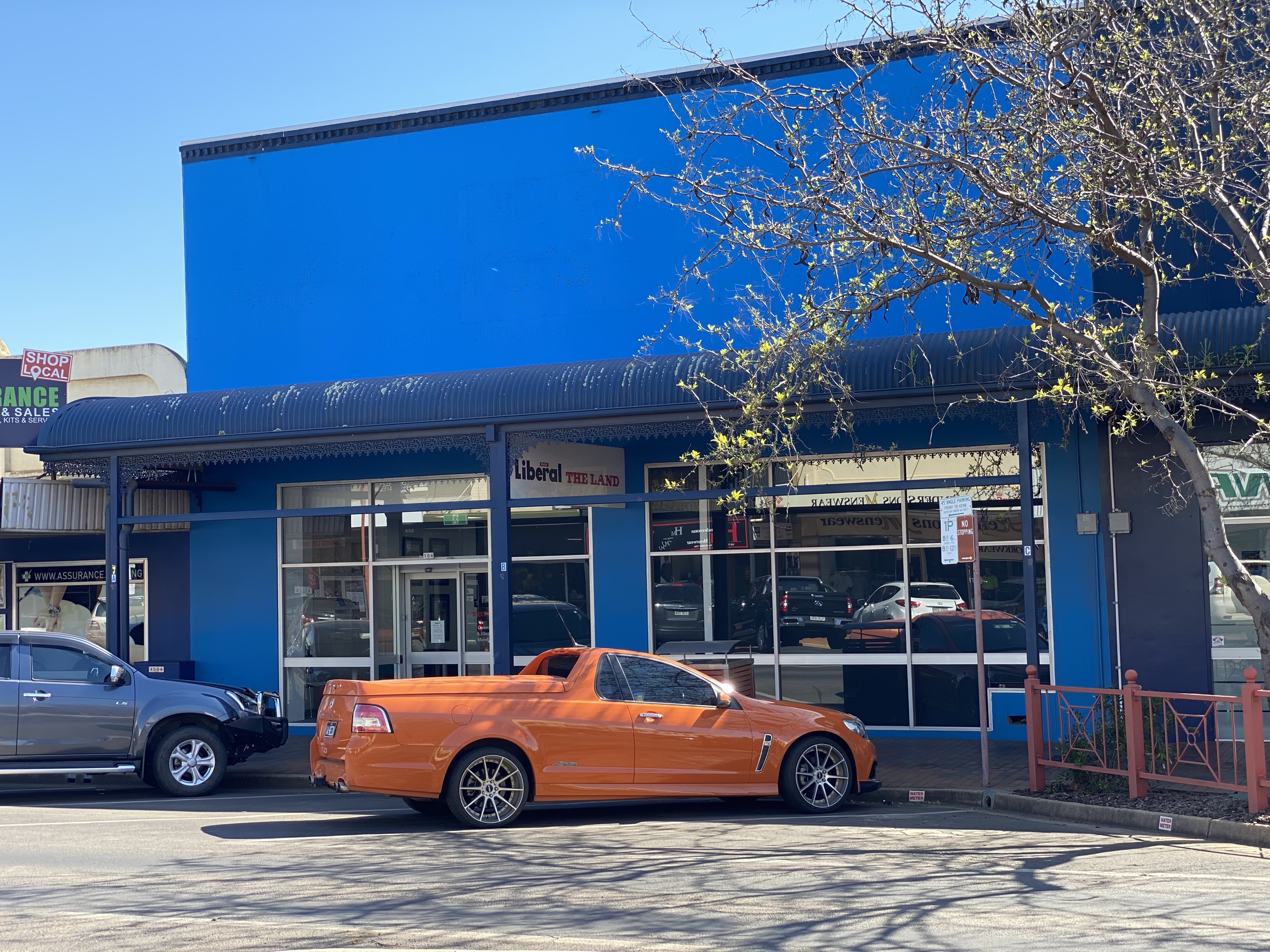
- Daily Liberal office in Dubbo
- Type: Weekly newspaper
- Format: Tabloid
- Owner: Australian Community Media
- Founded: 1875
- Headquarters: Dubbo, New South Wales, Australia
- Website: www.dailyliberal.com.au

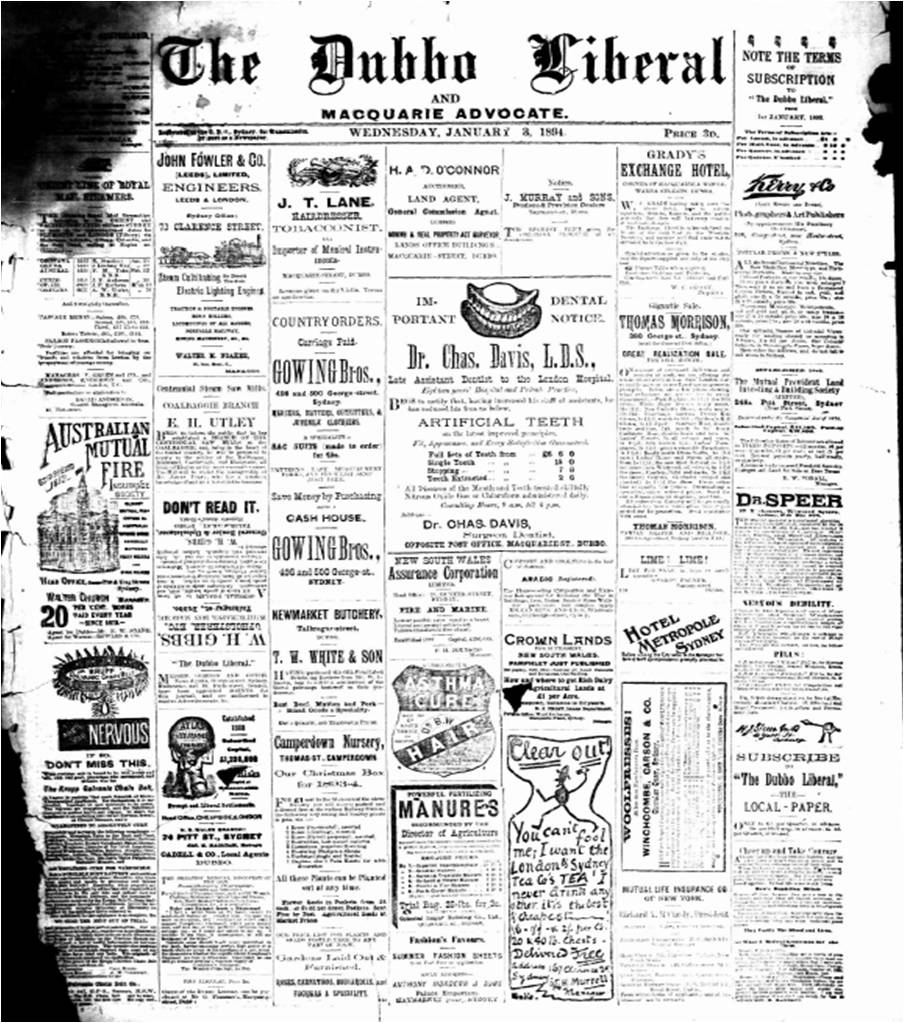
Dubbo Liberal & Macquarie Advocate 3 January 1894

The Daily Liberal is a weekly newspaper produced in the city of Dubbo, New South Wales, Australia. The news stories published relate particularly to the city of Dubbo and the surrounding district. The newspaper was first printed in 1875. The current price for the daily editions is A$2.00. It has previously been published as The Dubbo Liberal and Macquarie Advocate and The Daily Liberal and Macquarie Advocate.

== History ==
The paper was named The Dubbo Liberal and Macquarie Advocate from 1892 to 1927, and was published by William White. It sought to publish "The latest colonial and intercolonial telegrams, cablegrams, local and general news". The newspaper was distributed every Wednesday and Saturday mornings from an office in Wingewarra Street, Dubbo to surrounding towns including Bourke, Bathurst, Gilgandra, Narromine, Orange, Walgett and Wellington.

From June 1964 it was published by Macquarie Publications as The Daily Liberal and Macquarie Advocate.

In February 2025, Australian Community Media reduced the printed edition from daily to weekly.

== Distribution ==
The Daily Liberal is distributed to the major western towns of Dubbo, Brewarrina, Narromine, Wellington, Gilgandra, Coonamble, Bourke, Cobar and Walgett most commonly as an insert to each town's respective local paper.

== Ownership ==
In 1949, the newspaper was purchased by Leo Armati and his wife Pat, establishing Macquarie Publications group that grew into the largest independently owned regional publishing group in Australia. Macquarie retained ownership until December 1995 when Rural Press acquired the Daily Liberal, the Weekend Liberal and the other 55 newspapers and magazines in the Macquarie Publications group. Rural Press merged into Fairfax Media in 2007, but was split out into Australian Community Media when Fairfax was acquired by Nine Entertainment in July 2018.

== Digitisation ==
This newspaper has been partially digitised as part of the Australian Newspapers Digitisation Program project hosted by the National Library of Australia.
