= Tinned Dog =

Slang term for tinned meat

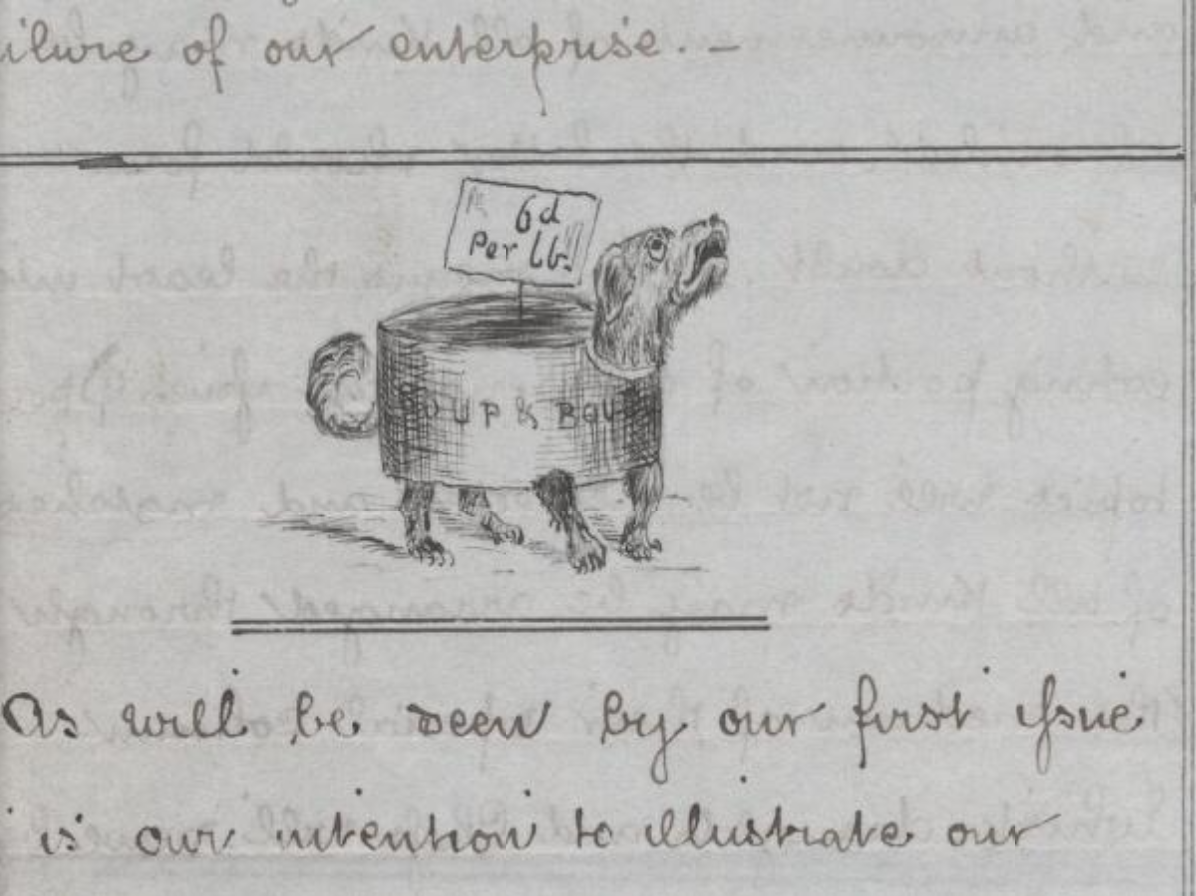
Newspaper illustration c.1874

Tinned Dog was a slang term for canned meat in Australia in the late 19th and early 20th centuries. The expression was mostly used in the Western Australian goldfields where prospectors and diggers could spend weeks in the outback and relied on tinned food, which was convenient and filling although monotonous. Meals around a camp fire would be damper, tinned dog and billy tea, usually abbreviated to 'damper, dog and tea'. Even in the towns fresh food was a luxury and tinned food became a staple. Coolgardie, one of the two largest towns in the goldfields was no exception. It was referred to in one newspaper article as 'Tinned Dog city'.

The first known use of the expression in print is in The Western Australian Goldfields Courier in 1894 in a description of life in a mining camp - "A small army have managed to knock out enough [gold] to keep the camp going in damper and tinned dog." However a sketch of a tin of soup and bouilli in a newspaper on the SS Durham sailing from Australia to England in 1874 suggests it was in use much earlier.

The origin of the term tinned dog is not known but it was possibly sailors' slang.
