= History of France–United States relations =

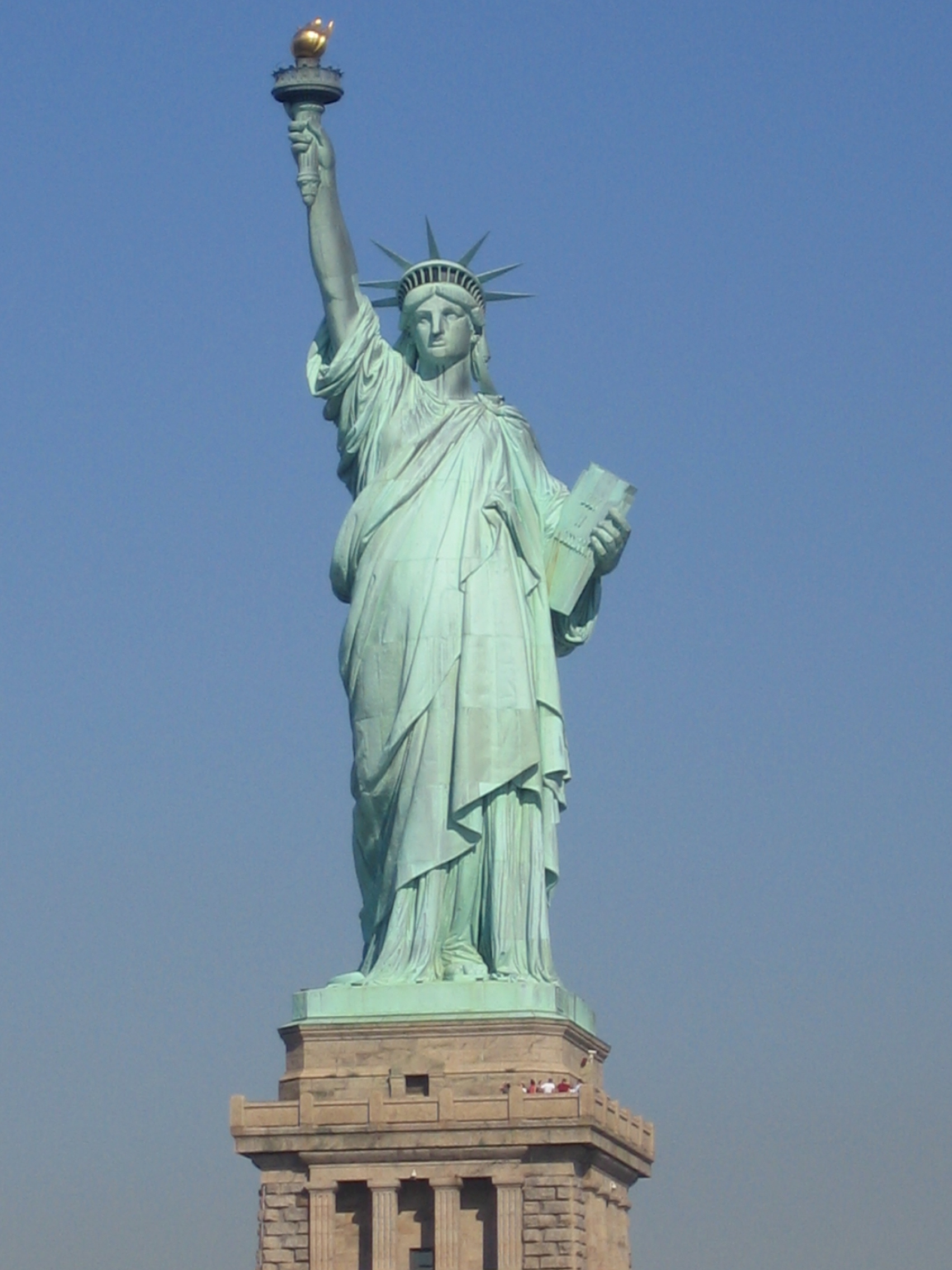
The Statue of Liberty is a gift from the French people to the American people in memory of the United States Declaration of Independence.

The relationship between France and the United States was historically important in the latter's independence from the United Kingdom, and continues to be strong into the present day.

== Post-Columbian era ==
New France (French: Nouvelle-France) was the area colonized by France beginning with exploration in 1534 and ending with the cession of New France to Great Britain and Spain in 1763 under the Treaty of Paris.

The vast territory of New France consisted of five colonies at its peak in 1712, each with its own administration: Canada, the most developed colony, was divided into the districts of Québec, Trois-Rivières, and Montréal; Hudson's Bay; Acadie in the northeast; Plaisance on the island of Newfoundland; and Louisiane. It extended from Newfoundland to the Canadian Prairies and from Hudson Bay to the Gulf of Mexico, including all the Great Lakes of North America. The colony of Louisiana (New France) became part of the United States between 1776 and 1803, but outside of what is now the state of Louisiana it had a very small French population.

Population grew steadily because of high birth rates and good food supplies. In 1754 New France's population consisted of 10,000 Acadians, 55,000 Canadiens, while the territories of upper and lower Louisiana had about 4,000 permanent French settlers, summing to 69,000 people.

The British expelled the Acadians in the Great Upheaval from 1755 to 1764. Their descendants are dispersed in modern Canada and in the U.S., in Maine and Louisiana.

=== French and Indian wars ===
Beginning in earnest after 1688, the simmering dynastic, religious and factional rivalries between the Protestant Britain and the larger power Catholic France triggered four wars in Europe that spilled over into North America. They were "French and Indian Wars" fought largely on American soil (King William's War, 1689–1697; Queen Anne's War, 1702–1713; King George's War, 1744–1748; and, finally the Seven Years' War, 1756–1763). The French made allies of most of the Indian tribes and enabled them to attack villages in New England. Great Britain won and finally removed the French from continental North America in 1763.

In 1763, France ceded almost all of New France to Britain and Spain, at the Treaty of Paris. Britain took over Canada, Acadia, and the parts of French Louisiana which lay east of the Mississippi River, except for the Île d'Orléans. Spain was granted all the French claims to the west of the Mississippi River. In 1800, Spain returned its portion of Louisiana to France under the secret Treaty of San Ildefonso in 1800 imposed by Napoleon Bonaparte. He sold it all to the United States in the Louisiana Purchase of 1803, permanently ending French colonial efforts on the American mainland. New France became absorbed within the United States and Canada. In the United States, the legacy of New France includes numerous place names as well as pockets of French-speaking communities.

== Post-American Revolution ==
Within a decade of the French being expelled in 1763, the British colonies revolted openly. In retaliation, France, led by Luis de Unzaga y Amézaga, secretly provided troops and war materials to the independence movement.

After the Second Continental Congress declared independence in July 1776, its representatives in Paris recruited officers for the Continental Army, most notably the Marquis de Lafayette, who served with distinction as a major general. Despite lingering distrust of France, the representatives also sought a formal alliance. After preparing their fleet and witnessing the U.S. victory at the Battle of Saratoga in October 1777, the French concluded treaties of commerce and alliance on February 6, 1778, committing themselves to fight Britain until the independence of the United States was secured.

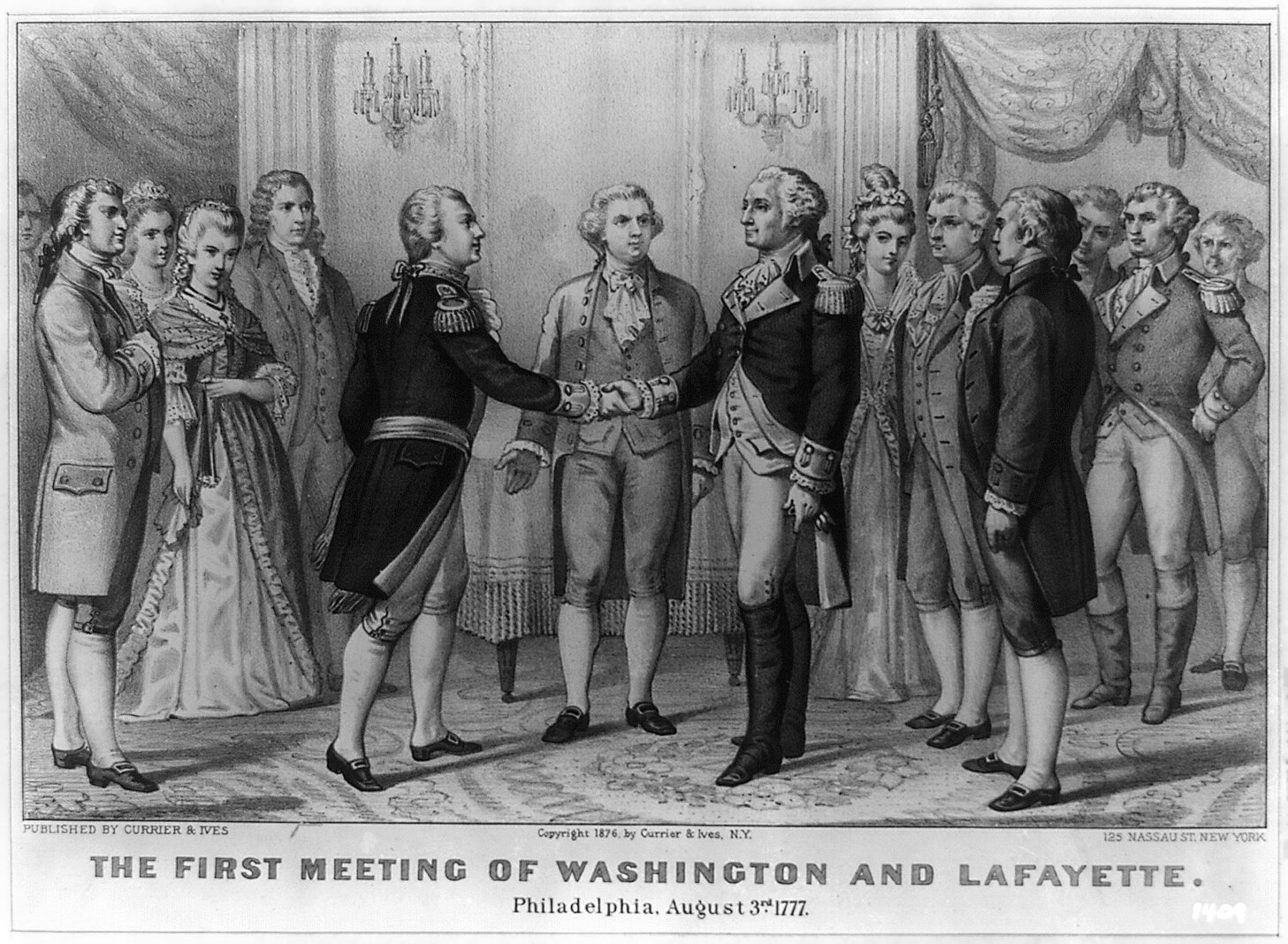
The Marquis de Lafayette visiting George Washington in 1777 during the American Revolutionary War.

The military alliance got off to a rocky start. In 1778, French Admiral d'Estaing sailed to North America with a fleet and began a joint effort with American General John Sullivan to capture a British outpost in Newport, Rhode Island. However, d'Estaing abandoned the operation to confront a British fleet and, despite pleas from Sullivan and Lafayette, sailed away to Boston for repairs. With no naval support, the plan fell apart, and American forces under Sullivan had to conduct a fighting retreat on their own. American outrage was widespread, and several sailors from the Royal French Navy were killed in anti-French riots. D'Estaing's actions during a disastrous siege in Savannah, Georgia further damaged Franco-American relations.

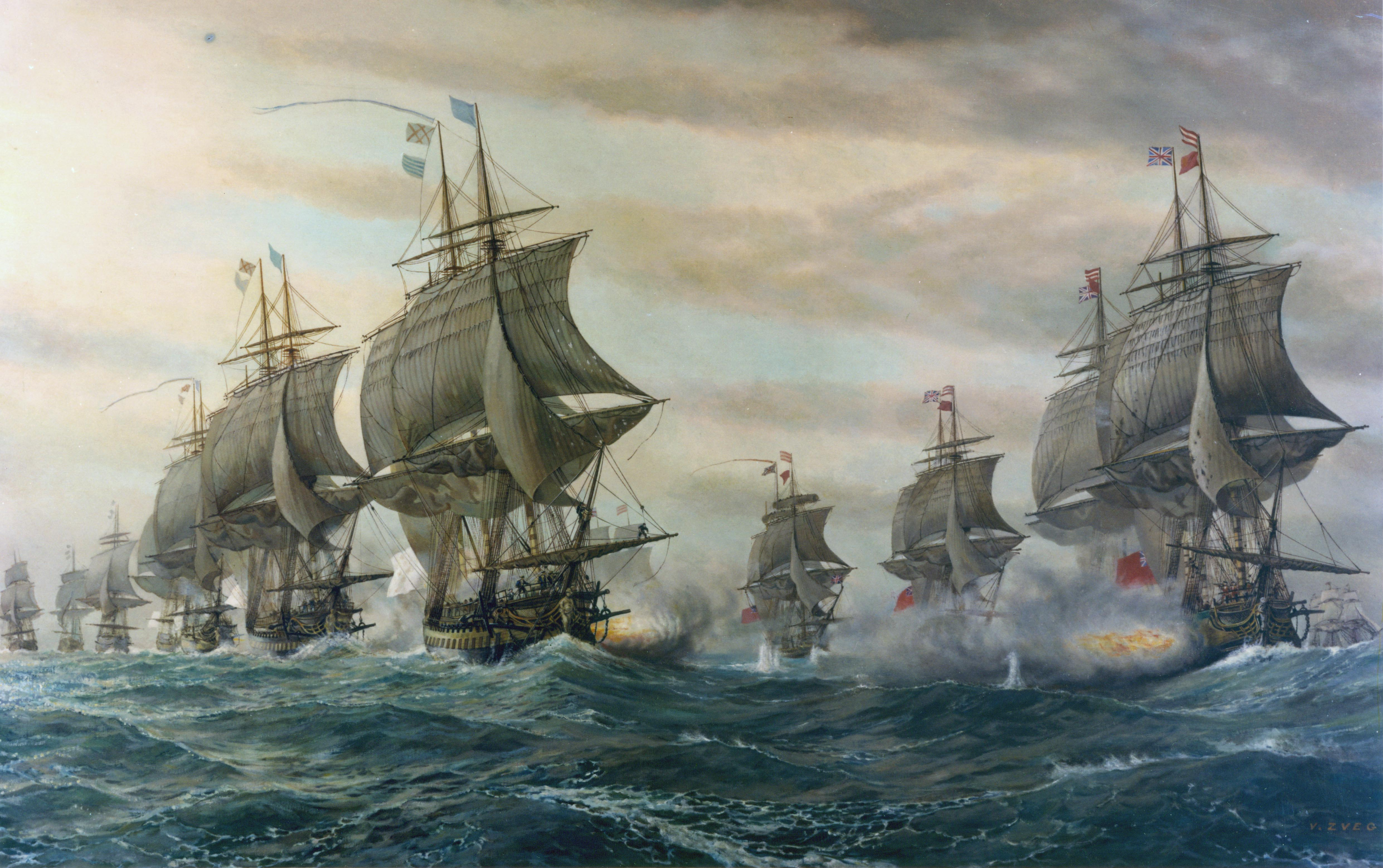
The Battle of the Chesapeake where the French Navy defeated the Royal Navy in 1781

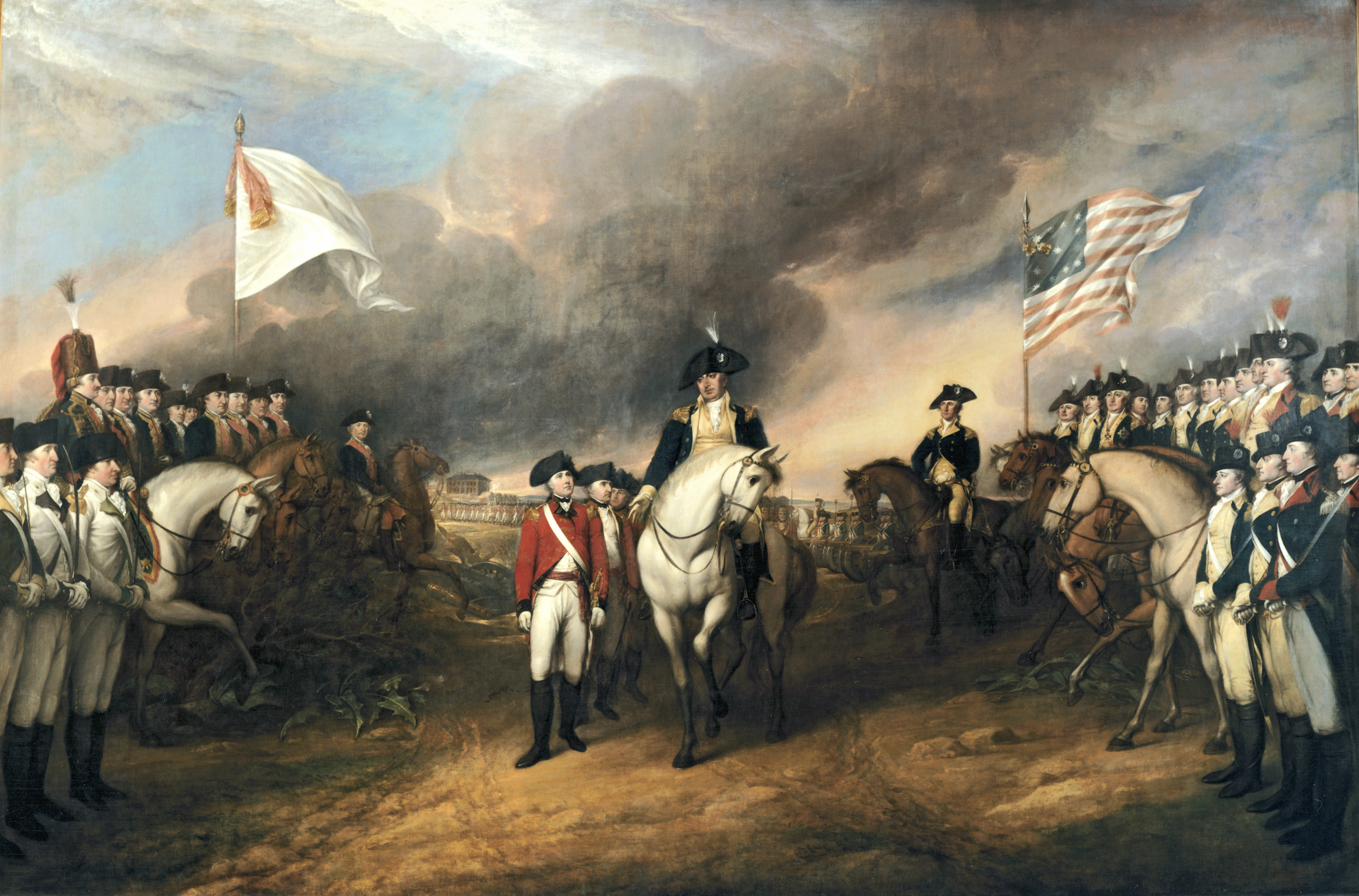
Surrender of Lord Cornwallis depicting the English surrendering to French (left) and American (right) troops.

The alliance improved in 1780 with the arrival of the comte de Rochambeau, who maintained a good working relationship with General Washington. French naval actions at the Battle of the Chesapeake enabled the decisive Franco–American victory at the siege of Yorktown in October 1781, effectively bringing an end to major combat in North America.

The nascent United States relied on Catholic France for military, financial, and diplomatic aid, leading to a significant decrease in anti-Catholic rhetoric. The historian Francis Cogiano argues that the king replaced the pope as the common enemy. Although anti-Catholic sentiment remained strong among Loyalists who chose to stay in the new nation, legal toleration for Catholics had been established across the United States by the 1780s, including in New England, a region historically known for its hostility towards Catholicism. Cogliano wrote: "Amidst war and crisis, New Englanders relinquished not only their allegiance to Britain but also one of their deeply held prejudices."

=== Peace treaty ===
During the peace negotiations between the Americans and the British in Paris in 1782, the French played a significant role. The French Foreign Minister, the comte de Vergennes, had strategically maneuvered to ensure that the American Congress ordered its delegation to follow French advice. However, the American commissioners, Benjamin Franklin, John Adams, and particularly John Jay, correctly understood that France did not want a strong United States. They realized that they would receive better terms directly from Britain. The critical turning point came in September 1782 when Vergennes proposed a solution that strongly opposed the United States' interests. France was exhausted by the war, and everyone desired peace, except Spain, which insisted on continuing the war until capturing Gibraltar from the British. Vergennes then proposed a deal that Spain would accept instead of Gibraltar. According to this deal, the United States would gain independence but be confined to the area east of the Appalachian Mountains, while Britain would take control of the area north of the Ohio River. In the southern area, an independent Indian state under Spanish control would be established as a barrier state to prevent the Americans from accessing the Mississippi River or New Orleans, which were under Spanish control. In response, Jay promptly informed the British that he was willing to negotiate directly with them, thereby sidelining France and Spain. The British Prime Minister, Lord Shelburne, agreed, seeing an opportunity to separate the United States from France and establish a valuable economic partnership with the new country. The terms negotiated for the Western territories were as follows: the United States would acquire all the land east of the Mississippi River, north of Florida, and south of Canada, with the northern boundary remaining almost the same as it is today. Additionally, the United States would be granted fishing rights off Canadian coasts and agreed to allow British merchants and Loyalists to attempt to reclaim their property. This treaty was highly favorable for the United States, deliberately benefiting the British perspective. Prime Minister Shelburne foresaw highly profitable two-way trade between Britain and the rapidly growing United States, which indeed materialized. Trade with France remained on a much smaller scale.

=== The French Revolution ===
Six years later, the French Revolution overthrew the Bourbon regime. In the beginning, the United States was supportive of the changes in France, where the absolute hereditary monarchy was replaced by a constitutional republic. However, as the situation in France deteriorated, with the revolutionary government becoming more authoritarian and brutal, the United States' sympathy waned. Events such as the reign of terror diminished the warmth that the United States had for France. Unlike Thomas Jefferson, who left France in 1789, Gouverneur Morris (1752–1816) was highly critical of the French Revolution. Anne Cary Morris, describing her grandfather's conservative beliefs, stated, "He believed in tailoring the government to suit the condition, character, manners, and habits of the people. In France, this led him to favor a monarchical view, firmly believing that a republican form of government would not suit the French character."

A crisis emerged in American political circles in 1793 when France declared war on Great Britain during the War of the First Coalition, after the revolutionary government in Paris ordered the execution of Louis XVI. The young federal government in the United States was uncertain how to respond, with some arguing that the US was still obliged by the alliance of 1778 to go to war on the side of France. The treaty had been called "military and economic", and as the United States had not finished paying off the French war loan, the continued validity of the military alliance was also called into question. President George Washington (responding to advice from both Alexander Hamilton and Jefferson) recognized the new French government, but did not support France in its war with Britain, as expressed in his 1793 Proclamation of Neutrality. Congress agreed and a year later passed a neutrality act forbidding U.S. citizens from participating in the war and prohibiting the use of U.S. soil as a base of operations by either side in the conflict. The French revolutionary government viewed Washington's policy as a betrayal.

The first challenge to U.S. neutrality came from France, when its first diplomatic representative, the brash Edmond-Charles Genêt, toured the United States to organize U.S. attacks against Spanish and British interests. Washington demanded Genêt's recall, but by then the French Revolution had taken yet another turn and the new French ministers arrived to arrest Genêt. Washington refused to extradite Genêt (knowing he would be guillotined), and Genêt later became a U.S. citizen.

France further regarded Jay's Treaty (November 1794) between Britain and the United States as hostile to French interests; the treaty opened a decade of American trade with the British when France was at war with Britain.

Timothy Pickering (1745–1829) was the third United States Secretary of State, serving in that office from 1795 to 1800 under Washington and John Adams. Biographer Gerald Clarfield says he was a "quick-tempered, self-righteous, frank, and aggressive Anglophile," who handled the French poorly. In response the French envoy Pierre Adet repeatedly provoked Pickering into embarrassing situations, then ridiculed his blunderings and blusterings to appeal to Democratic-Republican opponents of the Federalist Adams Administration.

==== Undeclared naval fighting: Quasi War (1798–1800) ====
To overcome this resentment John Adams sent a special mission to Paris in 1797 to meet the French foreign minister Talleyrand. The American delegation was shocked, however, when it was demanded that they pay monetary bribes in order to meet and secure a deal with the French government. Adams exposed the episode, known as the "XYZ Affair", which greatly offended Americans even though such bribery was not uncommon among the courts of Europe.

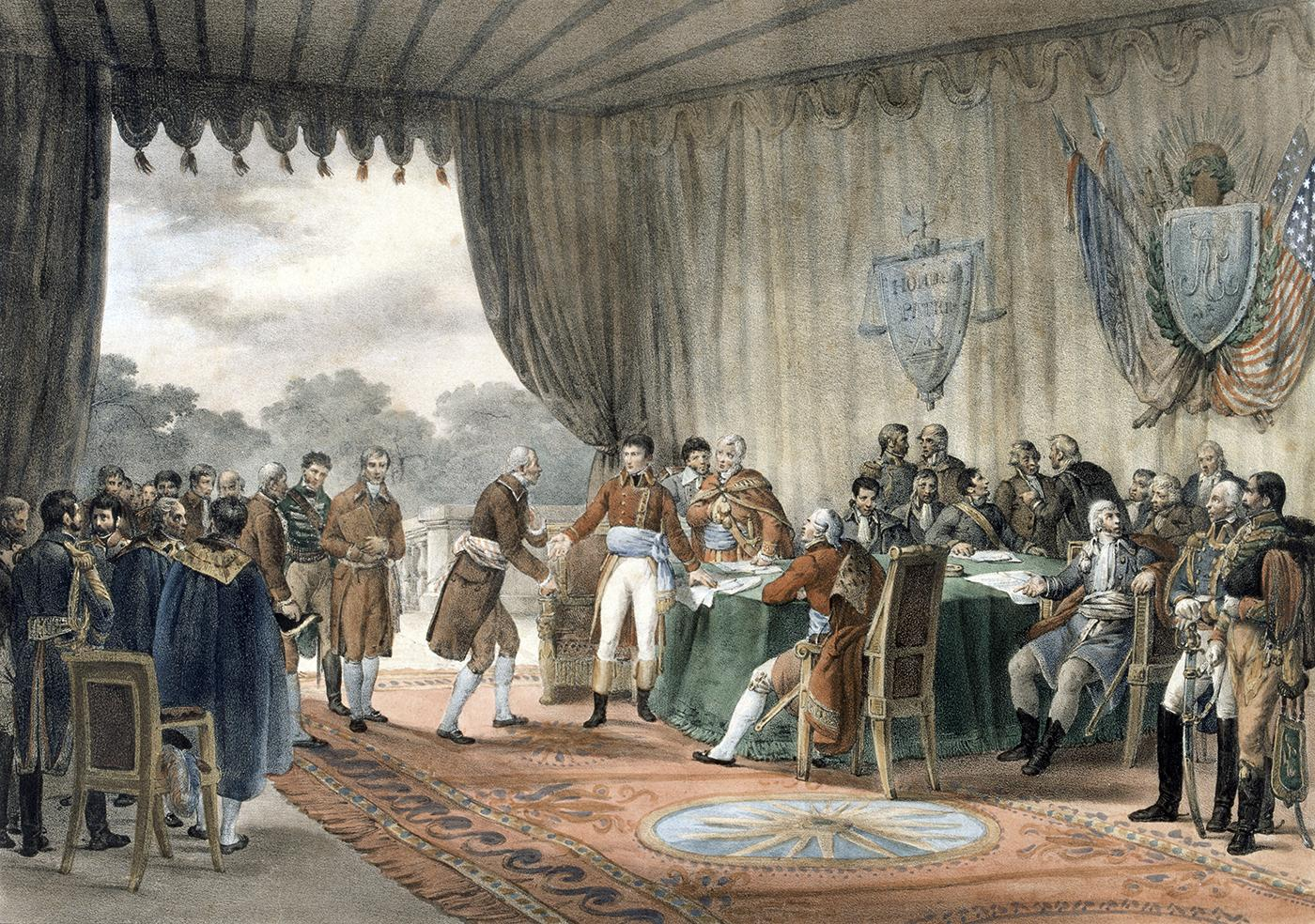
Signing of the Convention of 1800, ending the Quasi War and ending the Franco-American alliance.

Tensions with France escalated into an undeclared war—called the "Quasi-War." It involved two years of hostilities at sea, in which both navies attacked the other's shipping in the West Indies. The unexpected fighting ability of the U.S. Navy, which destroyed the French West Indian trade, together with the growing weaknesses and final overthrow of the ruling Directory in France in the Coup of 18 Brumaire, led Talleyrand to reopen negotiations. At the same time, President Adams feuded with Hamilton over control of the Adams' administration. Adams took sudden and unexpected action, rejecting the anti-French hawks in his own party and offering peace to France. In 1800 he sent William Vans Murray to France to negotiate peace; Federalists cried betrayal. The subsequent negotiations, embodied in the Convention of 1800 (also called the "Treaty of Mortefontaine") of September 30, 1800, affirmed the rights of Americans as neutrals upon the sea and abrogated the alliance with France of 1778. The treaty failed to provide compensation for the $20,000,000 "French Spoliation Claims" of the United States; the U.S. government eventually paid these claims. The Convention of 1800 ensured that the United States would remain neutral toward France in the wars of Napoleon and ended the "entangling" French alliance with the United States. In truth, this alliance had only been viable between 1778 and 1783.

=== Napoleon ===
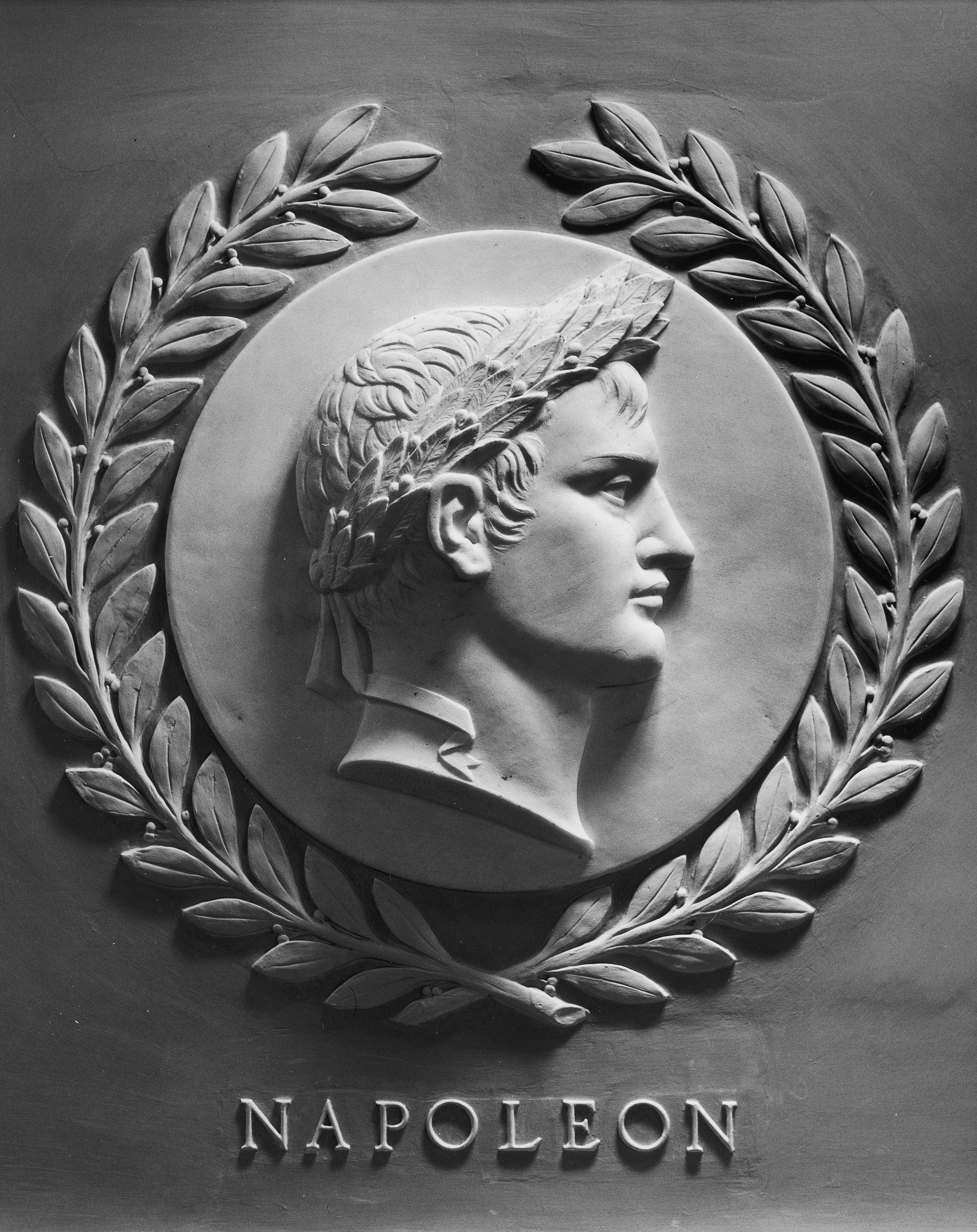
Bas-relief of Napoleon I in the chamber of the United States House of Representatives.

The Spanish Empire was losing money heavily on the ownership of vast Louisiana territory, and was eager to turn it over to Napoleon in 1800. He envisioned it as the base (along with Haiti) of a New World empire. Louisiana would be a granary providing food to the enslaved labor force in the West Indies. President Jefferson could tolerate weak Spain but not the powerful First French Empire in the west. He considered war to prevent French control of the Mississippi River. Jefferson sent his close friend, James Monroe, to France to buy as much of the land around New Orleans as he could. Surprisingly, Napoleon agreed to sell the entire territory. Because of an insuppressible slave rebellion in St. Domingue, modern-day Haiti, among other reasons, Bonaparte's North American plans collapsed. To keep Louisiana out of British hands in an approaching war he sold it in April 1803 to the United States for $15 million. British bankers financed the deal, taking American government bonds and shipping gold to Paris. The size of the United States was doubled without going to war.

Britain and France resumed their war in 1803, just after the Louisiana Purchase. Both challenged American neutrality and tried to disrupt American trade with its enemy. The presupposition was that small neutral nations could benefit from the wars of the great powers. Jefferson distrusted both Napoleon and Britain, but saw the British (with its monarchy, aristocracy, powerful navy and control over Canada) as the more immediate threat to American interests. Therefore, he and Madison took a generally pro-French position and used the embargo to hurt British trade. Another point of Anglo-American contention was the desertion of thousands of British sailors to U.S. merchantmen, which led to the Royal Navy impressing approximately 6,000 alleged deserters from American merchant ships.

This inflamed American public opinion and resulted in calls for war with Britain, which led to Jefferson signing the Embargo Act in 1807, which forbade all foreign trade, exports and imports. Though designed to hurt the British, American commerce harmed far more and was rescinded in 1809, as Jefferson left office. The new Madison administration chose a more direct approach and in 1812 declared war on Britain. Despite both nations now in open war against the British, throughout the War of 1812 there never existed either a formal or informal sense of renewed alliance between the U.S. and France and no direct effort was ever made to coordinate military activity. With the Louisiana purchase the U.S. inherited French claims to Texas and border disputes with Spain's adjacent colonial empire. These issues were resolved by the Adams–Onís Treaty in 1819 which helped pave the way for the U.S. purchase of Florida.

=== Alienation ===
Catherine Hebert reports that French visitors before 1790 made highly favorable reports of American culture, influenced perhaps by the ideals of the noble savage and the American acceptance of the Enlightenment. However the Royalist exiles who came in the 1790s responded in a highly negative fashion to republicanism, and few remained permanently.

According to James Banner, conservative Americans reacted strongly against the French Revolution, with its disdain toward religion and its zest for the guillotine. American minister James Monroe managed to rescue Thomas Paine from the guillotine in Paris in 1794. Jeffersonians at first supported the French Revolution, but after Napoleon came to power in 1799 Jefferson and his followers repudiated it as the antithesis of republicanism. The result was the destruction of the 1778 alliance and indeed the friendship between the United States and France. The new hostility enhanced the conservative elements in American republicanism. The alienation increased American sensibility about being "a people apart" and strengthened distrust of foreign influences and rejection of alien ideologies.

=== 1815–1860 ===
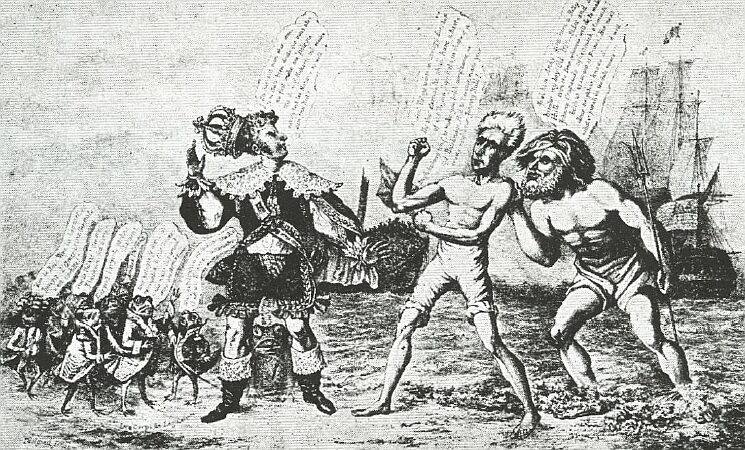
1835 cartoon by James Akin shows President Jackson challenging French King Louis Philippe, whose crown is falling off; Jackson is advised by king Neptune, and backed up by an American warship. On the left are French politicians, depicted as little frogs, complaining about the Americans.

Relations between the two nations were generally quiet for two decades with both trade and migration staying low. The United States, issued the "Monroe Doctrine" in 1823 to keep European powers, such as France, from colonizing lands in the New World. France had a strong interest in expanding commercially and imperially into Latin America as Spanish hegemony there collapsed. There was a desire among top French officials that some of the newly independent countries in Latin America might select a Bourbon king, though no actual operations ever took place. French officials ignored the American position. France and Austria, two reactionary monarchies, strenuously opposed American republicanism and wanted the United States to have no voice whatsoever in their affairs.

A treaty between the United States and France in 1831 called for France to pay 25 million francs for the spoliation claims of American shipowners against French seizures during the Napoleonic wars. France did pay European claims, but refused to pay the United States. President Andrew Jackson was livid, and in 1834 ordered the U.S. Navy to stand by and asked Congress for legislation. Jackson's political opponents blocked any legislation. France was annoyed but finally voted the money in exchange for an apology-which Jackson refused, and diplomatic relations were broken off until December 1835 when Jackson offered some friendlier words. Eventually through British mediation, France paid the money, and cordial relations were resumed.

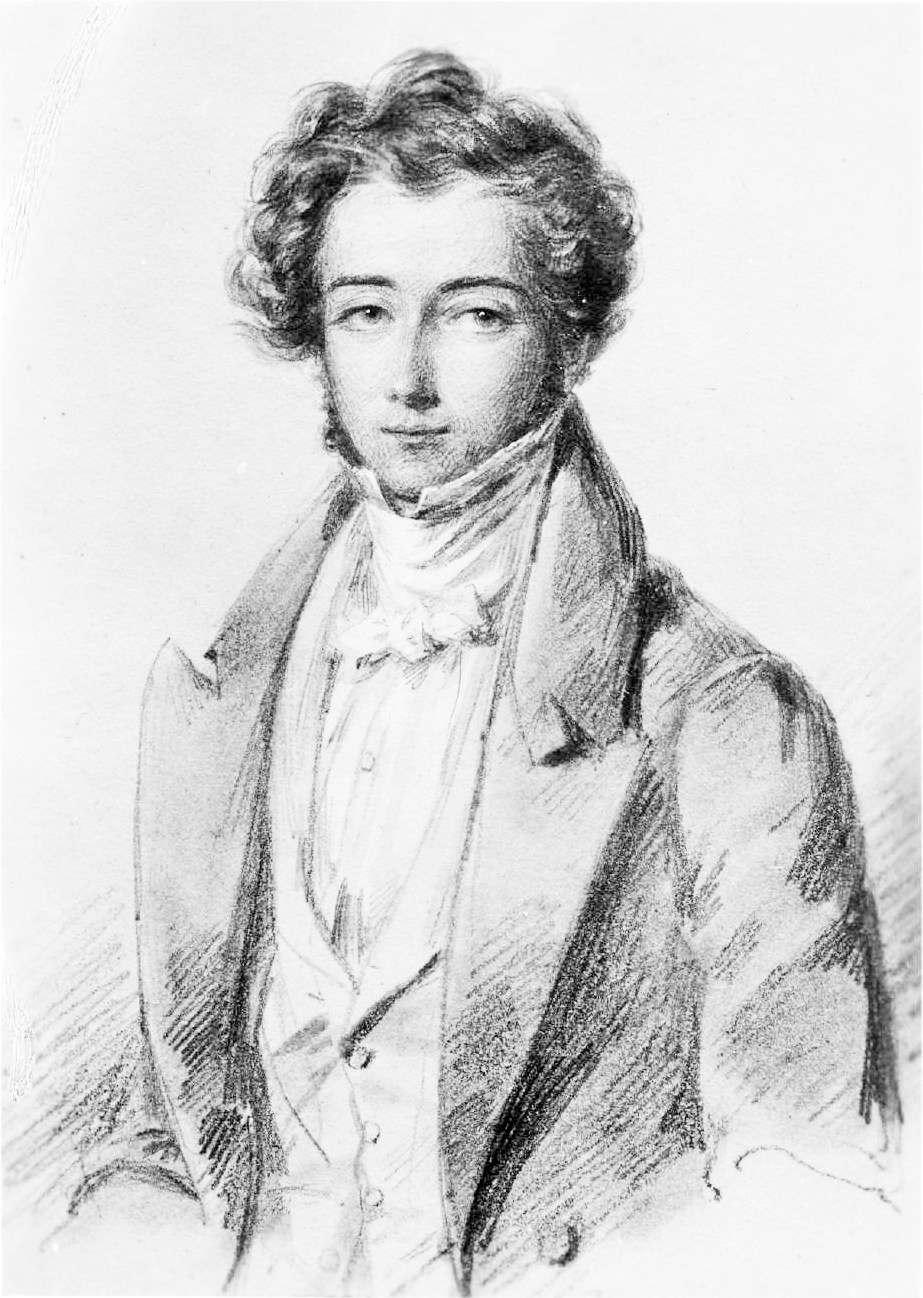
Alexis de Tocqueville (1805–59), the most influential European student of American culture.

Modest cultural exchanges resumed, most famously intense study visits by Gustave de Beaumont and Alexis de Tocqueville, the author of Democracy in America (1835). The book was immediately a popular success in both countries, and to this day helps shape American self-understanding. American writers such as James Fenimore Cooper, Harriet Beecher Stowe, and Ralph Waldo Emerson appealed to an appreciative French audience. French utopian socialists projected an idealized American society as a model for the future. French travelers to the United States were often welcomed in the name of the Marquis de Lafayette, who despite having lost much of his influence in France, remained a popular hero in the Revolution in US and made a triumphant American tour in 1824. Numerous political exiles found refuge in New York.

In the 1840s Britain and France considered sponsoring continued independence of the Republic of Texas and blocking U.S. moves to obtain California. Balance of power considerations made Britain want to keep the western territories out of U.S. hands to limit U.S. power; in the end, France opposed such intervention in order to limit British power, the same reason for which France had sold Louisiana to the U.S. and earlier supported the American Revolution. Thus the great majority of the territorial growth of the continental United States was accepted without question by Paris.

== Post-American Civil War ==
During the American Civil War, 1861–65, France was neutral, as was every other nation. However Napoleon III favored the CSA, hoping to weaken the United States, gain a new ally in the Confederacy, safeguard the cotton trade and protect his large investment in controlling the Second Mexican Empire. France was too weak to act alone and sought the support of the British who also favored the Confederacy but were ultimately unwilling to risk war with the U.S.

Napoleon III took advantage of the war in 1863, when he installed Austrian archduke Maximilian of Habsburg on the Mexican throne. Washington protested and refused to recognize the new government. Napoleon hoped that a Confederate victory would allow French dominance over Mexico. Matías Romero, Júarez's ambassador to the United States, gained some support in Congress for possibly intervening on Mexico's behalf against France's occupation. Seeking to avoid war with France, Secretary of State William Seward cautiously limited aid to the Mexican rebels until the Confederacy was near defeat.

By 1865, United States diplomatic pressure coupled with the massing of US soldiers on the border with Mexico, persuaded Napoleon III to withdraw French troops and support. The democratic Mexican government was soon restored and Maximilian executed.

After the assassination of Abraham Lincoln in April 1865, an outpouring of sympathy from French citizens proceeded. A nationwide collection for a medal, expressing the people's sympathy for Lincoln's death, was taken.

The Union victory, French withdrawal from Mexico, and the Russian sale of Alaska left the United States dominant in the Western Hemisphere.

=== 1867–1914 ===
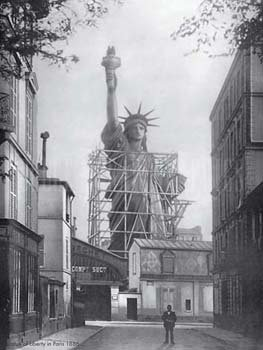
Construction of the Statue of Liberty in Paris.

The removal of Napoleon III in 1870 after the Franco-Prussian War helped improve Franco–American relations. American public opinion favored a German victory. During the German Siege of Paris, the small American population, led by the Minister to France Elihu B. Washburne, provided much medical, humanitarian, and diplomatic support to Parisians, gaining much credit to the Americans. In subsequent years the balance of power in the relationship shifted as the United States, with its very rapid growth in wealth, industry and population, came to overshadow the old powers. Trade was at a low level, France minimized the activity of American banks and insurance companies, tariffs were high, and mutual investments were uncommon.

Famous writer Mark Twain once wrote with humour, "France has neither winter nor summer nor morals. Apart from these drawbacks it is a fine country. France has usually been governed by prostitutes."

All during this period, the relationship remained friendly—as symbolized by the Statue of Liberty, presented in 1884 as a gift to the United States from the French people. From 1870 until 1918, France was the only major republic in a Europe of monarchies, which endeared it to the United States. Few French people emigrated, but many held the United States in high esteem, as a land of opportunity and as a source of modern ideas. Intellectuals, however, saw the United States as a land built on crass materialism, lacking in a significant culture, and boasting of its distrust of intellectuals. Very few self-styled French intellectuals were admirers.

In 1906, when Germany challenged French influence in Morocco (see Tangier Crisis and Agadir Crisis), President Theodore Roosevelt sided with the French. Nevertheless, as the U.S. grew mightily in economic power, and forged closer ties with Britain, the French increasingly talked about an Anglo-Saxon threat to their culture.

Student exchange became an important factor, especially Americans going to France to study. The French were annoyed that so many Americans were going to Germany for post-graduate education, and discussed how to attract more Americans. After 1870, hundreds of American women traveled to France and Switzerland to obtain their medical degrees. The best American schools were closed to them and chose an expensive option superior to what they were allowed in the U.S. In the First World War, normal enrollments plunged at French universities, and the government made a deliberate decision to attract American students partially to fill the enrollment gap, and more importantly to neutralize German influences in American higher education. Thousands of American soldiers, waiting for their slow return to America after the war ended in late 1918, enrolled in university programs set up especially for them.

=== World War I (1914–19) ===
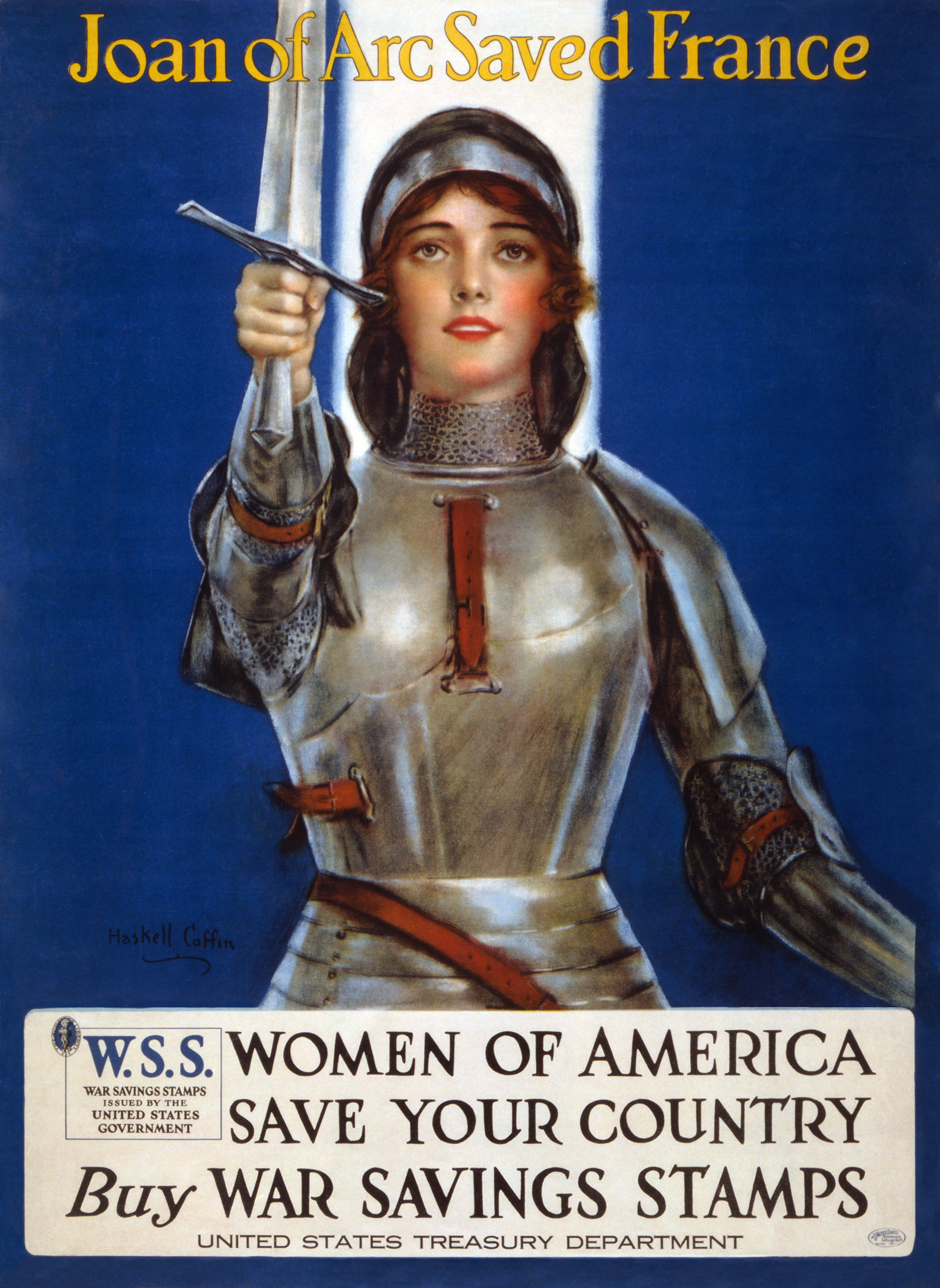
United States patriotic poster depicting the French heroine Joan of Arc during the World War I.

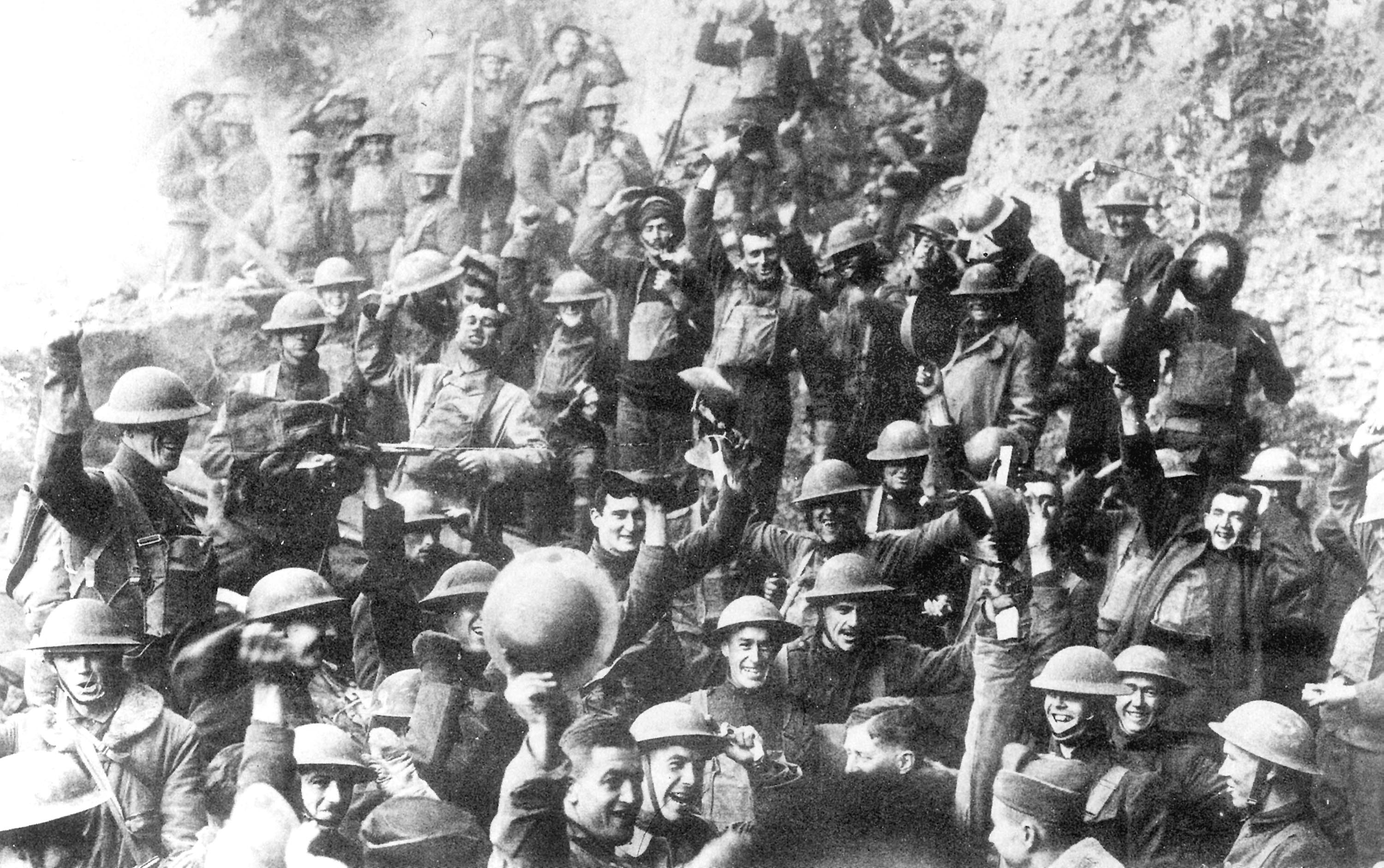
American soldiers of the 64th Regiment, part of the 7th Division, celebrate the news of the Armistice, November 11, 1918.

When World War I broke out the United States declared itself neutral, a status it maintained for almost 3 years until entering the conflict in April 1917 on the side of the Allies. Both before and after Washington provided much-needed money—as loans to be repaid—that purchased American food, oil and chemicals for the French effort. The first wave of initial American soldiers to arrive at the Western Front brought no heavy equipment (so that the ships could carry more soldiers). In combat they used French artillery, airplanes and tanks, such as the SPAD XIII fighter biplane and Renault FT light tank serving in the aviation and armored formations of the American Expeditionary Force on the Western Front. In 1918 the United States sent over two million combat troops under the command of General John J. Pershing, who operated on their own sector of the Western Front. They gave the Allies a decisive edge, as the Germans were unable to replace their heavy losses and virtually collapsed by September 1918.

==== The peace settlement (1919) ====
President Woodrow Wilson had become the hero of the war for Frenchmen, and his arrival in Paris was widely hailed. However, the two countries clashed over France's policy to weaken Germany and make it pay for the huge destructions suffered by France on which soil war had almost entirely been fought. The ambition of French Premier Georges Clemenceau was to ensure the security of France in the future; his formula was not friendship with Germany but restitution, reparations, and guarantees. Clemenceau had little confidence in what he considered to be the unrealistic and utopian principles of Wilson: "Even God was satisfied with Ten Commandments, but Wilson insists on fourteen" (a reference to Wilson's "Fourteen Points"). The two nations disagreed on debts, reparations, and restraints on Germany. President Wilson along with Clemenceau and British Prime Minister David Lloyd George led in making major decisions at the conference. Wilson made the new League of Nations his highest priority; the other two went along but had much less confidence in the value of the new League.

Clemenceau was also determined that a buffer state should be established in the Rhineland under the aegis of France. In the eyes of the U.S. and British representatives, such a crass violation of the principle of self-determination would only breed future wars, and a compromise was therefore offered Clemenceau, which he accepted. The territory in question was to be occupied by Allied troops for a period of five to fifteen years, and a zone extending fifty kilometers east of the Rhine was to be demilitarized. Wilson and Lloyd George agreed to support a treaty that would guarantee France against German aggression. Republican leaders in Washington were willing to support a security treaty with France. It never came to a Senate vote because Wilson insisted on linking it to the Versailles Treaty, which the Republicans would not accept without certain amendments Wilson refused to allow.

French historian Duroselle portrays Clemenceau as wiser than Wilson, equally compassionate and committed to justice but one who understood that world peace and order depended on the permanent suppression of the German threat. Blumenthal (1986), by contrast, says Wilson's policies were far sounder than the harsh terms demanded by Clemenceau. Blumenthal agrees with Wilson that peace and prosperity required Germany's integration into the world economy and political community as an equal partner.

=== Interwar years (1919–38) ===
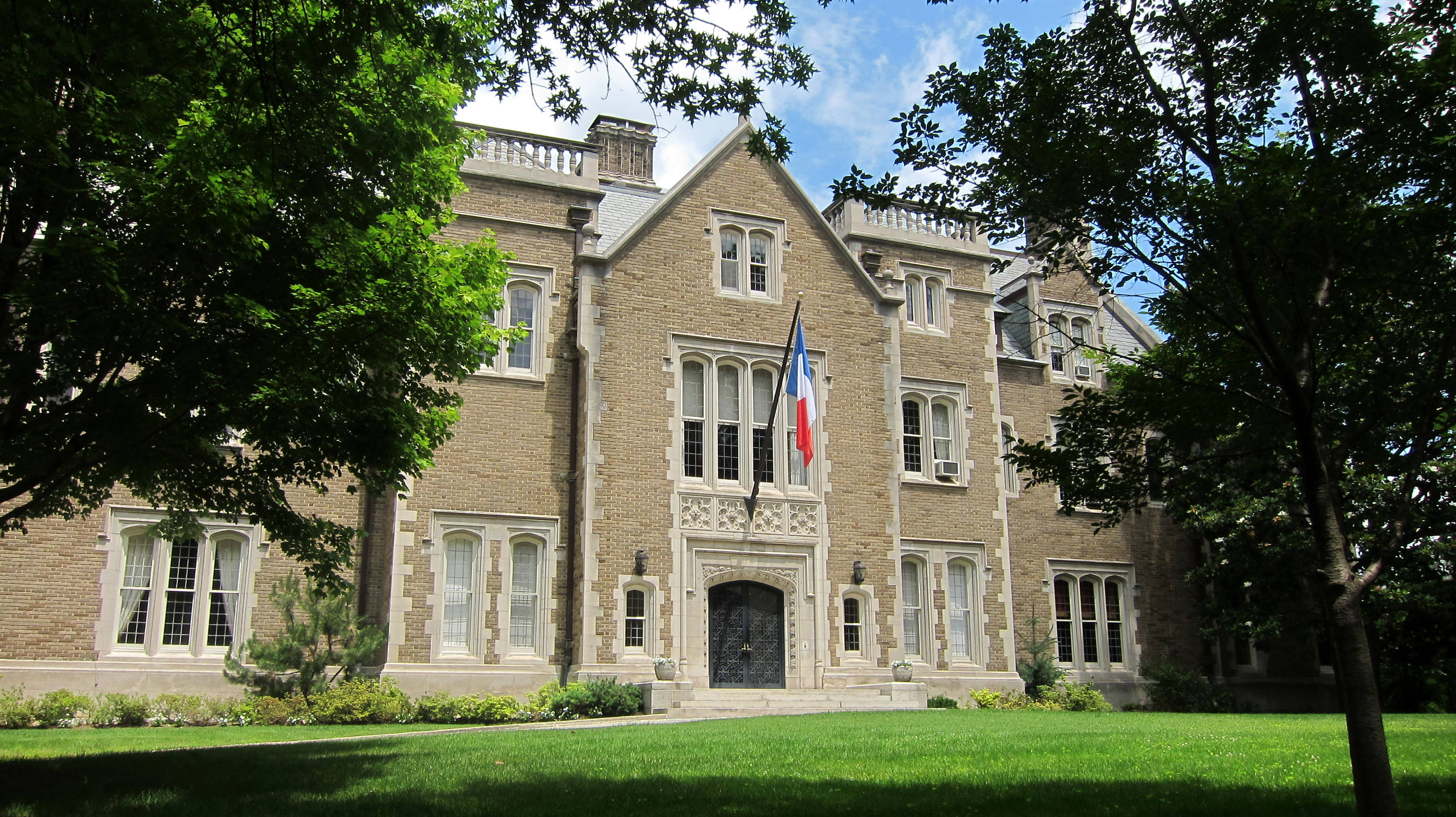
The French ambassador's residence in Washington, D.C. It served as the French embassy from 1936 to 1985.

During the interwar years, the two nations remained friendly. Beginning in the 1920s, U.S. intellectuals, painters, writers, and tourists were drawn to visit and because of their interest in French art, literature, fashion, wines, and cuisine. Tensions rose over Washington's insistence that Paris repay war loans while in the same time supporting the unwillingness of Berlin to pay France the reconstruction cost of devastated territories in northern France as provided by the Treaty of Versailles. A deal was reached: the Dawes Plan where American banks made loans to Germany, enabling them to pay reparations to France, who in turn would cover their American war loans. This system collapsed with in the Great Depression however.

A number of American artists, such as Josephine Baker, experienced popular success in France. Paris was quite welcoming to American jazz music and black artists in particular, as France, unlike a significant part of the United States at the time, had no racial discrimination laws. Numerous writers such as William Faulkner, F. Scott Fitzgerald, Ernest Hemingway, and others were deeply influenced by their experiences of French life. Known as the Lost Generation, their time in Paris was documented by Hemingway in his memoir A Moveable Feast.

However, anti-Americanism came of age in the 1920s, as many French traditionalists were alarmed at the power of Hollywood and warned that America represented modernity, which in turn threatened traditional French values, customs, and popular literature. The alarm of American influence escalated half a century later when Americans opened the $4 billion Disneyland Paris theme park in 1992; it attracted larger crowds than the Louvre, and soon it was said that the iconic American cartoon character Mickey Mouse had become more familiar than Asterix among French youth.

The J. Walter Thompson Company of New York was the leading American advertising agency of the interwar years. It established branch offices in Europe, including one in Paris in 1927. Most of these branches were soon the leading local agencies, as in Britain and Germany, JWT-Paris did poorly from the late 1920s through the early 1960s. The causes included cultural clashes between the French and Americans and subtle anti-Americanism among potential clients. Furthermore, The French market was heavily regulated and protected to repel all foreign interests, and the American admen in Paris were purportedly not good at hiding their condescension and insensitivity.

In 1928 the two nations were the chief sponsors of the Kellogg–Briand Pact. The pact, which was endorsed by most major nations, renounced the use of war, promoted peaceful settlement of disputes, and called for collective force to prevent aggression. Its provisions were incorporated into the United Nations Charter and other treaties and it became a stepping stone to a more activist American policy. Diplomatic intercourse was minimal under Franklin D. Roosevelt from 1933 to 1939.

=== World War II (1938–45) ===
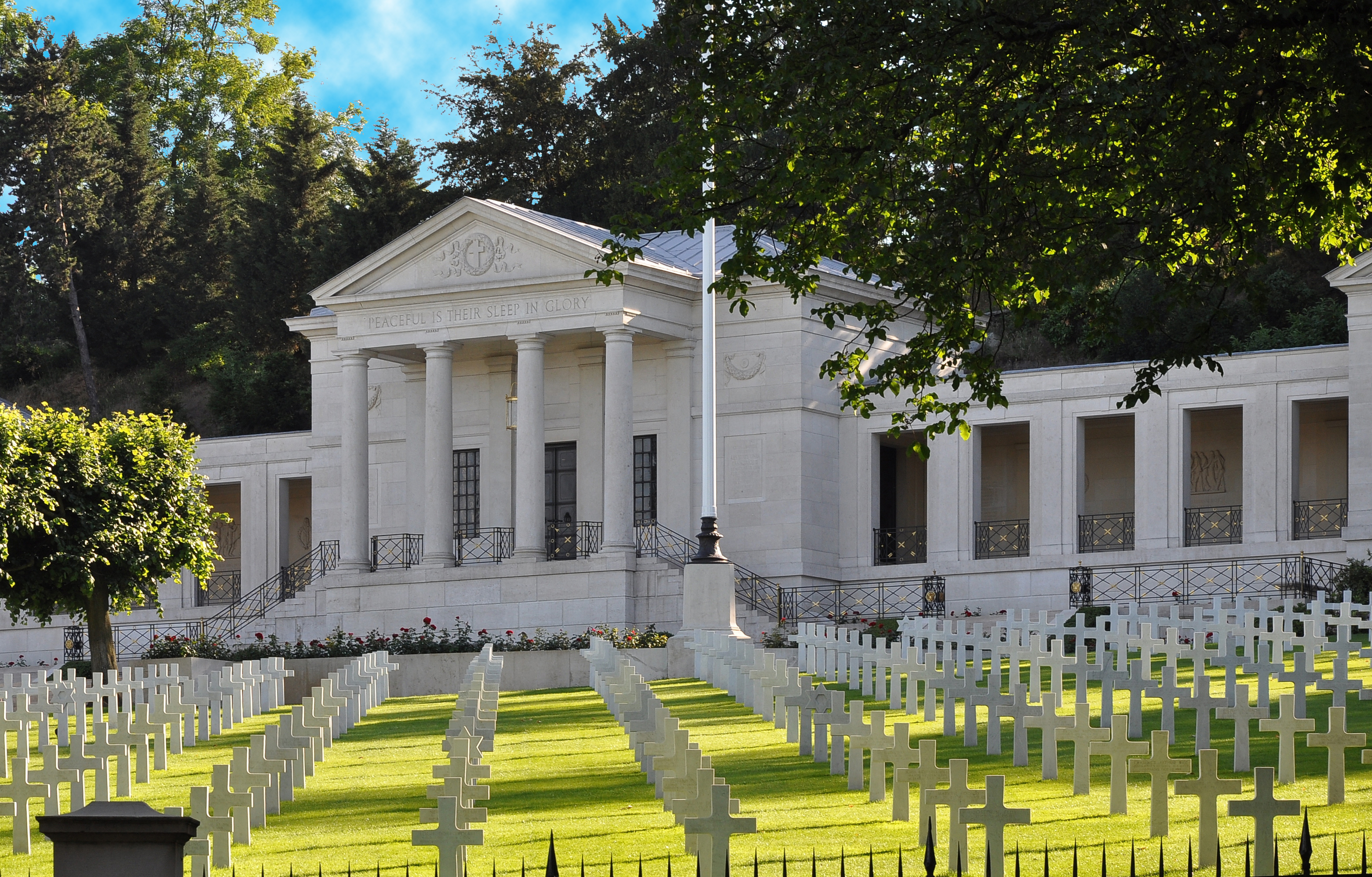
American Cemetery and Memorial in Suresnes, France

In the approach to the Second World War the United States helped France arm its air force against the Nazi threat. The sudden outbreak of war had forced France to realize that Germany had a larger more advanced Air Force. President Roosevelt had long been interested in France, and was a personal friend of French Senator, Baron Amaury de La Grange. In late 1937 he told Roosevelt about the French weaknesses, and asked for military help. Roosevelt was forthcoming, and forced the War Department to secretly sell the most modern American airplanes and other equipment to France. The U.S. military opposed the sale of their latest designs, and American factories needed time to ramp up production. Fewer than 200 U.S. warplanes could be delivered before France surrendered in 1940. Paris frantically expanded its own aircraft production, but it was too little and too late. France and Britain declared war on Germany when it invaded Poland in September 1939, but there was little action until the following spring. The German blitzkrieg overwhelmed Denmark and Norway and trapped French and British forces in Belgium. France chose to accept German surrender terms and quickly transformed into a rump state and authoritarian regime under the rule of Pétain, whose informal seat was in Vichy.

==== Vichy France (1940–44) ====
The American position towards Vichy France and Charles de Gaulle was especially hesitant and inconsistent. Roosevelt disliked de Gaulle and agreed with Leahy's view that de Gaulle was an "apprentice dictator".

After war, the U.S. government asked to a Harvard professor, William Langer, to justify this policy initially very favourable to Vichy: this book was entitled Our Vichy Gamble (1947) and it almost totally whitewashed the policy.

Langer argues that Washington was shocked by the sudden collapse of France in spring 1940, and feared that Germany might gain control of the large French fleet, and exploit France's overseas colonies. This led the Roosevelt administration to maintain diplomatic relations. FDR appointed his close associate Admiral William D. Leahy as ambassador, and the embassy—also representing the United Kingdom due to France's rupture of relations—moved from Paris to Vichy, shortly moving to the Hôtel des Ambassadeurs and then to the Villa Ica next door. The Vichy regime was officially neutral but in practice subservient to the Axis. The United States severed diplomatic relations in late 1942 after Germany took direct control of the areas Vichy had previously governed autonomously.

Langer's book was then used as new evidence to request a review of the trial of Pétain by his lawyer in 1950 (the case was eventually dismissed). According to one reviewer, this book should have been called Our Vichy Fumble.

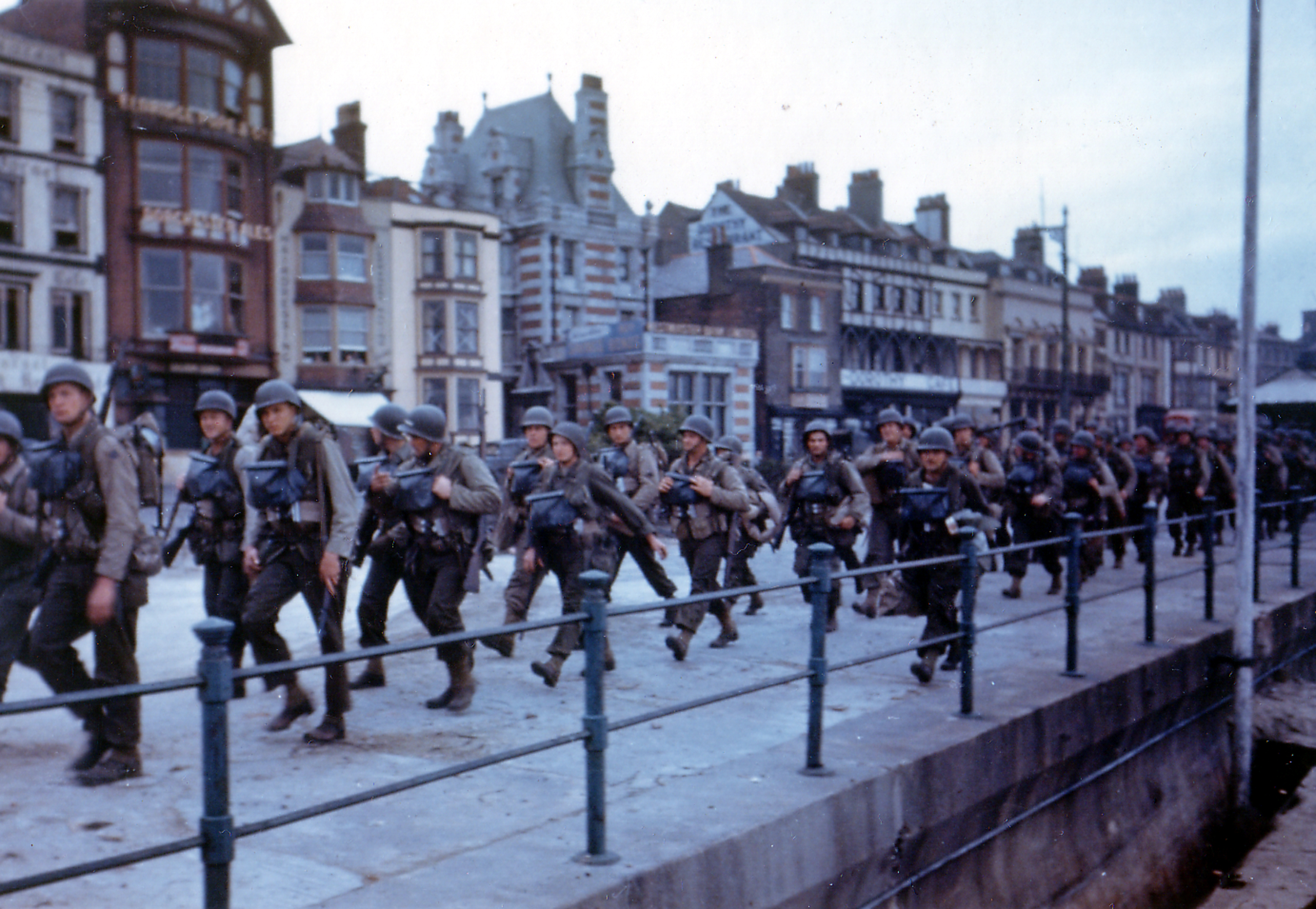
U.S. troops in Normandy, 1944

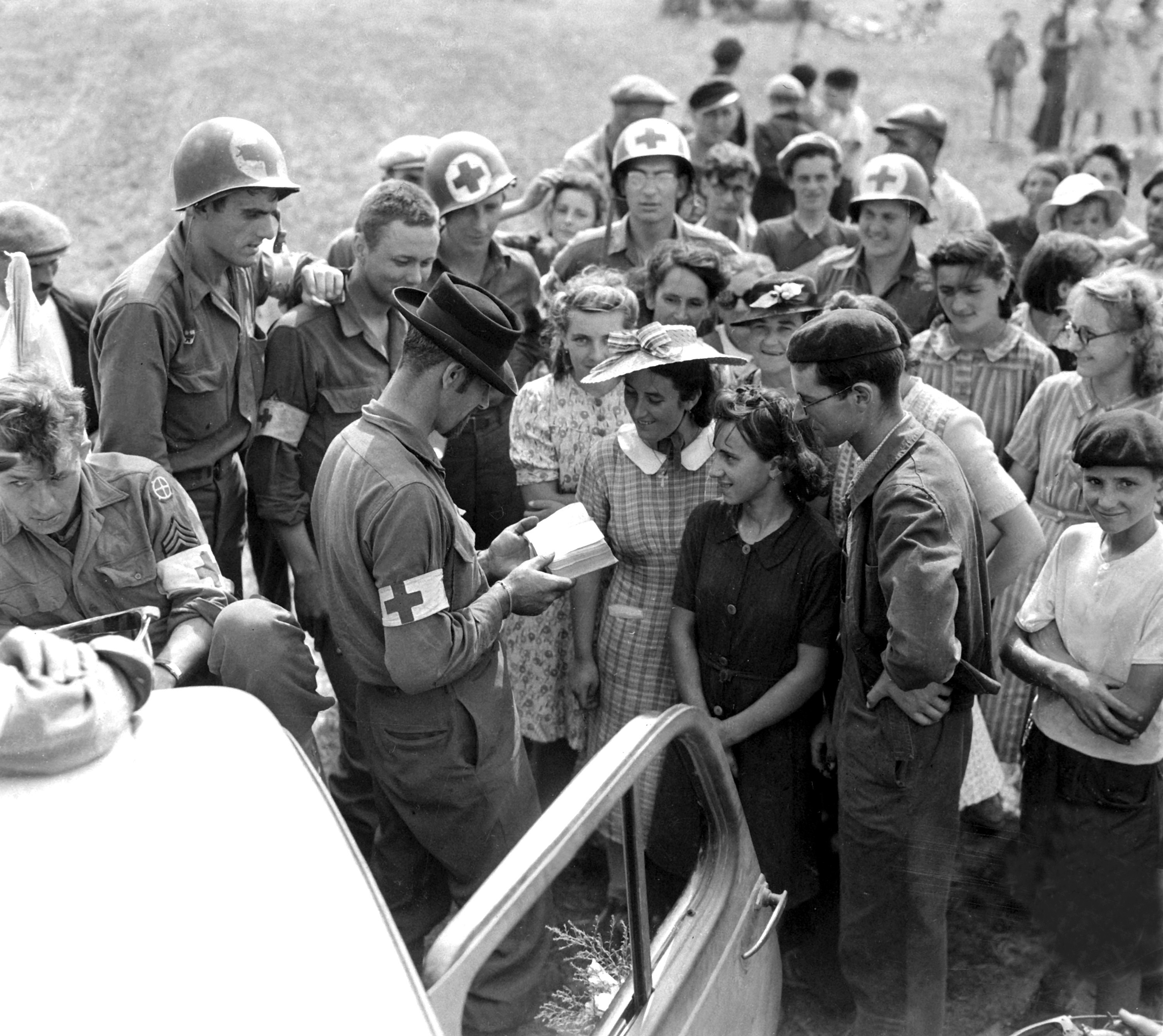
U.S. Army medics in Orléans, 1944

According to a contemporary historian, there were numerous and obvious indications that the American public did not support its government's Vichy policy, that it saw Vichy's true colors, and that it even supported de Gaulle's Free France movement. When visiting the United States in July 1944, de Gaulle received a very warm welcome from large public audiences when in the same time Roosevelt was slow to acknowledge that the Provisional Government formed around de Gaulle in Algiers was truly representing political parties and trade unions as they would take their position back after the liberation of France.

==== Free French Forces ====
The United States formally recognized and established diplomatic relations with Vichy France (until late 1942) and avoided formal relations with the exiled government of de Gaulle's and its claim to be the one and only legitimate government of France. Relations were strained between Roosevelt and de Gaulle, the leader of the Free French. When the Free French Forces of de Gaulle occupied the islands of Saint Pierre and Miquelon, south of Newfoundland, in December 1941, Hull lodged a very strong protest and went as far as referring to the Gaullist naval forces as "the so-called Free French." His request to have the Vichy governor reinstated was met with strong criticism in the American press: newspapers mocked the "so-called Secretary of State".

After the Allied invasion of French North Africa in November 1942, the relationship complicated even more. Eisenhower's decision to recognize Admiral François Darlan as commander of all French forces in the area as well his self-nomination as High Commissioner of France in Africa (in order to put a quick end to French resistance in North Africa) was a blow to Fighting French. General de Gaulle was outraged; so were the pro-Allied conspirators who had seized Algiers. Some high American and British officials objected, and there was furious criticism by newspapers and politicians.

To the Fighting French, Admiral Darlan was a onetime Nazi collaborationist, and therefore a traitor. Roosevelt defended it (using wording suggested by Churchill) as 'a temporary expedient, justified only by the stress of battle'.

After the breakout at Normandy, most on both sides thought it was only a matter of time before the Nazis lost. Eisenhower did give de Gaulle his word that Paris could be formally liberated by French forces, given the city's heavy symbolic but lack of tactical value. It was therefore easy for Eisenhower to let de Gaulle's French Forces of the Interior take the charge. Hitler had given the order to bomb and burn Paris to the ground; he wanted to make it a second Stalingrad. The French 2nd armored division with Maj. General Phillipe Leclerc at its helm was granted the task of liberating Paris by the Allied Supreme Command. General Leclerc was ecstatic at this thought because he wanted to wipe away the humiliation of the Vichy Government.

General Eisenhower trusted Leclerc who had a long and successful experience of war operations and Paris was not in the way of the vast overtaking trajectory of the brilliant offensive led by General George S. Patton from Falaise in Normandy to the eastern border of France but leaving Paris on the north of its left flank. Anticipating the arrival of the 2nd Armored division of Leclerc, the French Resistance then fought to liberate the center of Paris. Eisenhower had agreed with de Gaulle, that the first allied soldiers to enter a liberated Paris be French.

The U.S. government announced in July 1944 that the French provisional government was recognized as the de facto authority in liberated France before the full recognition on 23 October 1944 of the Provisional Government of the French Republic. France was presenting kind of a unique situation for the Allied Forces when they embarked on liberating western Europe. The governments of the other western countries such as Belgium, Norway or the Netherlands did not sign any armistice with Nazi Germany but took refuge in the UK in 1940, they were to be simply reinstated by the liberation of their country. But the Vichy authorities could legally be considered as the French government who signed an armistice with Nazi Germany, engaged into an active collaborationist policy with the enemy, and seemed to still be widely popular. What would be the reaction of this government, of the population, of the communist resistance? Would the Provisional Government of Algiers be in a position to take control of the country and run an efficient local administration without facing a fierce opposition of the population or the armed "maquis"? To be in a position to directly administer the countries they were to occupy, the Allied Forces had set up an administrative corp called the Allied Military Government of Occupied Territories (AMGOT) which was planned for France as well as occupied Axis powers. After the battle of Normandy, de Gaulle proved that he was swift and efficient at restoring local administration by appointing Commissioners of the Republic in every department as soon as they were liberated and the AMGOT was never put in charge in France, unlike other liberated and occupied territories.

However the fact that the Allied Forces may have considered France as an "occupied" country instead of a "liberated" Allied country fostered some resentment among the political elites when of course the entire population was relieved and grateful. In addition, General Patton once complained about the Leclerc's division for being weak that “I would rather have a German division in front of me than a French one behind me.”

Nonetheless, the U.S. Third Army under General Patton continued to push the German Army from the country, first sweeping across northern France before going onto liberating Lorraine alongside Leclerc 2nd Armored Division later on assisted by the 1st French army and the American 7th army who landed in provence in August 1944.

==== Roosevelt opposes French colonies in Asia ====
Roosevelt was strongly committed to terminating European colonialism in Asia, including French Indochina and placing them under international trusteeship. Roosevelt offered post-war funding and diplomatic support to the Republic of China to stabilize and if necessary police the region. This scheme included Chinese occupation of French Indochina, a proposal that was directly contrary to the plans of the French; de Gaulle had a grand vision of the French overseas empire as the base for his return to defeat Vichy France. Roosevelt would not abide de Gaulle, but Winston Churchill, a staunch supporter of colonialism himself, realized that Britain needed French help to reestablish its position in Europe after the war. Churchill and the British foreign office worked with de Gaulle against Roosevelt's decolonization plans. By 1944, Chiang's government was barely hanging on; despite Roosevelt's faith in the Chinese they had proven to be weak, often unstable and strategically vulnerable ally. Moreover, Chiang continued to voice disinterest to Roosevelt in his trusteeship plan and the idea was dropped altogether by the end of the war.

== Cold War ==
=== Overview ===
In the postwar years, both cooperation and discord persisted. The French zone of occupation in Germany was formed from the U.S. zone. After de Gaulle left office in January 1946, the logjam was broken in terms of financial aid. Lend Lease had barely restarted when it was unexpectedly ended in August 1945. The U.S. Army shipped in food, 1944–46. U.S. Treasury loans and cash grants were given in 1945–47, and especially the Marshall Plan gave large sums (1948–51). There was post-Marshall aid (1951–55) designed to help France rearm and provide massive support for its war in Indochina. Apart from low-interest loans, the other funds were grants that did not involve repayment. The debts left over from World War I, whose payment had been suspended since 1931, was renegotiated in the Blum-Byrnes agreement of 1946. The United States forgave all $2.8 billion in debt from the First World War, and gave France a new loan of $650 million. In return French negotiator Jean Monnet set out the French five-year plan for recovery and development. The Marshall Plan gave France $2.3 billion with no repayment. The total of all American grants and credits to France from 1946 to 1953, amounted to $4.9 billion. A central feature of the Marshall Plan was to encourage international trade, reduce tariffs, lower barriers, and modernize French management. The Marshall Plan set up intensive tours of American industry. France sent 500 missions with 4700 businessmen and experts to tour American factories, farms, stores and offices. They were especially impressed with the prosperity of American workers, and how they could purchase an inexpensive new automobile for nine months work, compared to 30 months in France. Some French businesses resisted Americanization, but the most profitable, especially chemicals, oil, electronics, and instrumentation, seized upon the opportunity to attract American investments and build a larger market. The U.S. insisted on opportunities for Hollywood films, and the French film industry responded with new life.

=== Postwar alliance ===
In 1949 the two again became formal allies through the North Atlantic Treaty, which set up the NATO military alliance. Although the United States openly disapproved of French efforts to regain control of colonies in Africa and Southeast Asia, it supported the French government in fighting the Communist uprising in French Indochina. However, in 1954, U.S. President Dwight D. Eisenhower declined French requests for aerial strikes to relieve besieged French forces at Dien Bien Phu.

France somewhat reluctantly joined the American leadership in the Cold War to contain the Soviet Union, despite a large Communist presence in French politics. The Communists were kept out of the national government. From 1950 to 1953 in the Korean War, 3,200 French soldiers assisted South Korea by taking part in the fighting. Of these, 270 were killed.

A major crisis came in 1956 when France, Britain, and Israel attacked Egypt, which had recently nationalized the Suez Canal. Eisenhower forced them to withdraw. By exposing their diminished international stature, the Suez Crisis had a profound impact on the UK and France: the UK subsequently aligned its Middle East policy to that of the United States, whereas France distanced itself from what it considered to be unreliable allies and sought its own path.

=== De Gaulle ===
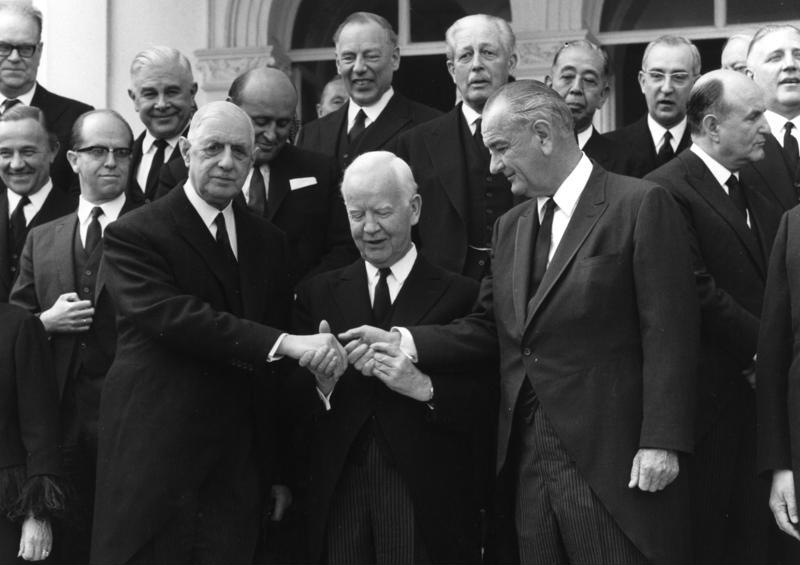
Charles de Gaulle, Heinrich Lübke and Lyndon B. Johnson, 1967

In the 1950s France sought American help in developing nuclear weapons; Eisenhower rejected the overtures for four reasons. Before 1958, he was troubled by the political instability of the French Fourth Republic and worried that it might use nuclear weapons in its colonial wars in Vietnam and Algeria. Charles de Gaulle brought stability to the Fifth Republic starting in 1958, but Eisenhower was still hesitant to assist in the nuclearization of France. De Gaulle wanted to challenge the Anglo-Saxon monopoly on Western weapons by having his own Force de frappe. Eisenhower feared his grandiose plans to use the bombs to restore French grandeur would weaken NATO. Furthermore, Eisenhower wanted to discourage the proliferation of nuclear arms anywhere.

Charles de Gaulle also quarreled with Washington over the admission of Britain into the European Economic Community. These and other tensions led to de Gaulle's decision in 1966 to withdraw French forces from the integrated military structure of the North Atlantic Treaty Organization and forced it to move its headquarters from Paris to Brussels, Belgium. De Gaulle's foreign policy was centered on an attempt to limit the power and influence of both superpowers, which would increase France's international prestige in relative terms. De Gaulle hoped to move France from being a follower of the United States to a leading first-world power with a large following among certain non-aligned Third World countries. The nations de Gaulle considered potential participants in this grouping were those in France's traditional spheres of influence, Africa and the Middle East.

The two nations differed over the waging of the Vietnam War, in part because French leaders were convinced that the United States could not win. The recent French experience with the Algerian War of Independence was that it was impossible, in the long run, for a democracy to impose by force a government over a foreign population without considerable manpower and probably the use of unacceptable methods such as torture. The French popular view of the United States worsened at the same period, as it came to be seen as an imperialist power.

=== 1970–1989 ===
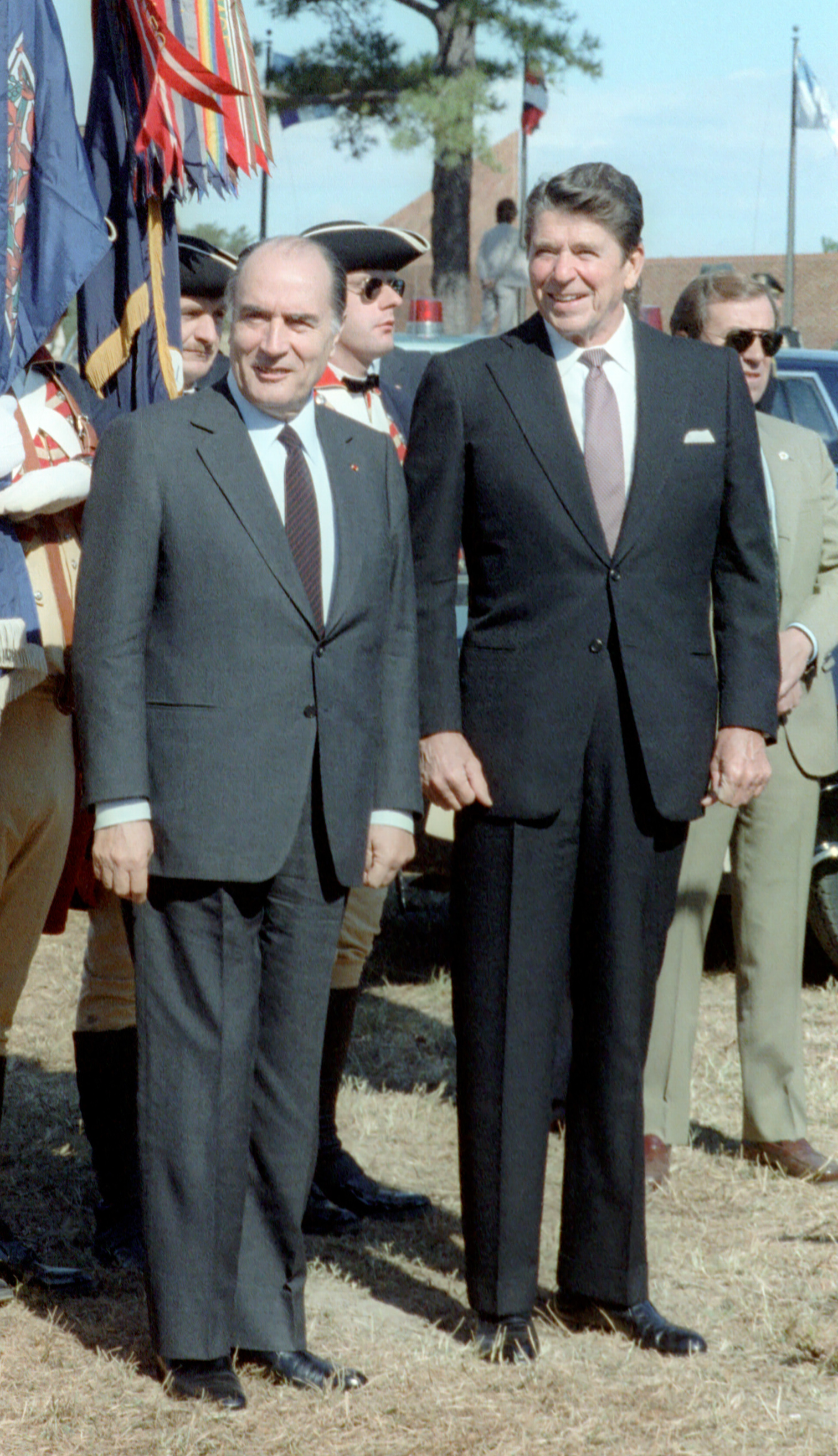
François Mitterrand and Ronald Reagan, 1981

Relations improved somewhat after de Gaulle lost power in 1969. Small tensions reappeared intermittently. France, more strongly than any other nation, has seen the European Union as a method of counterbalancing American power, and thus works towards such ends as having the Euro challenge the preeminent position of the United States dollar in global trade and developing a European defense initiative as an alternative to NATO. Overall, the United States had much closer relations with the other large European powers, Great Britain, Germany and Italy. In the 1980s the two nations cooperated on some international matters but disagreed sharply on others, such as Operation El Dorado Canyon and the desirability of a reunified Germany. The Reagan administration did its best efforts to prevent France and other European countries from buying natural gas from Russia, through the construction of the Siberia-Europe pipeline. The European governments, including the French, were undeterred and the pipeline was finally built.
