= Newburyport Herald =

1797–1915 newspaper in Massachusetts, US

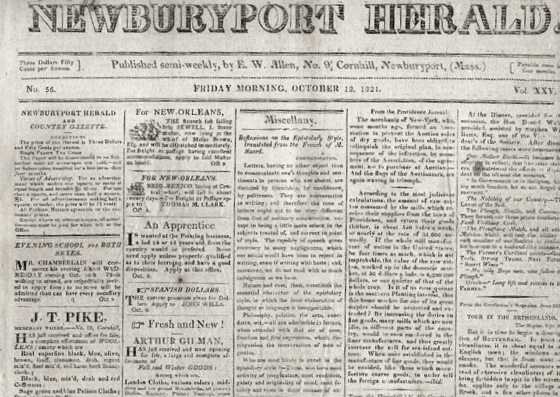
Newburyport Herald, 1821

The Newburyport Herald (1797–1915) was a newspaper published in Newburyport, Massachusetts, in the 19th century. It began in 1797 with the merger of two previous newspapers, William Barrett's Political Gazette and Angier March's Impartial Herald. Employees included abolitionist William Lloyd Garrison and James Akin.

== History ==
Edmund March Blunt was the publisher of the Impartial Herald, from 1793-1796. In December, 1794, under the firm name of Blunt & March, he united the Morning Star with the Impartial Herald. By 1795, the Impartial Herald was published twice a week. In 1796, Blunt sold his interest in the paper to Angier March who continued the publication until it was merged with the Political Gazette in 1797 when the name changed to the Newburyport Herald.

== Notable for ==
In 1805, American cartoonist and satirist James Akin published his now-infamous 'Infuriated Despondency', a satire of an altercation he had with former employer Edmund Blunt in Newburyport, in which Blunt hurled a skillet at Akin and hit an innocent passerby.

In 1812 the first usage of the word "gerrymander" (in a political sense) outside of the immediate Boston area came in the Herald on March 31. The paper continued until 1915.

== Variant titles ==
- Newburyport Herald and Country Gazette, 1797-1803, 1811-1815
- Newburyport Herald and Commercial Gazette, 1815-1817
- Newburyport Herald, Commercial and Country Gazette, 1817-1818
- Newburyport Herald, 1803-1811, 1818-188?
- Newburyport Weekly Herald, 1888-1902
