= James Akin =

American political cartoonist and engraver

- Born: c. 1773; Province of South Carolina
- Died: 1846 (aged c. 73)
- Occupation: Cartoonist

James Akin (c. 1773 – 1846) was an American political cartoonist and engraver from South Carolina. He worked in Philadelphia and Newburyport, Massachusetts. Associates included President William Henry Harrison and Jacob Perkins. His works are held at the American Antiquarian Society, Library of Congress, U.S. National Portrait Gallery, and Winterthur Museum.

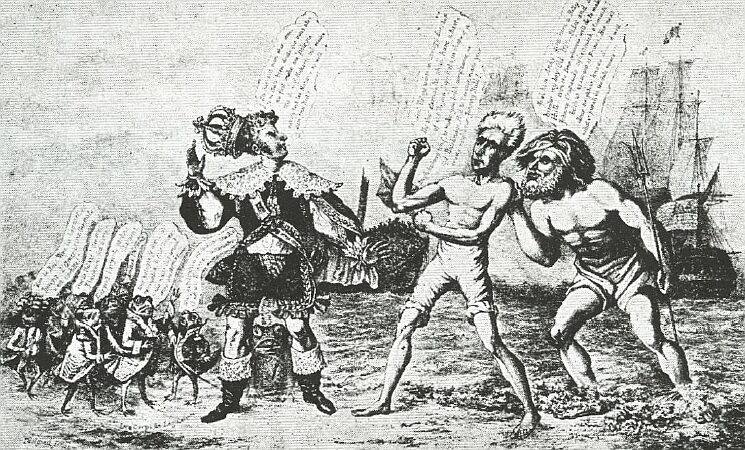
1835 cartoon shows President Jackson challenging French King Louis Philippe, whose crown is falling off; Jackson is advised by king Neptune, and backed up by an American warship. On the left are French politicians, depicted as little frogs, complaining about the Americans.

== Skillet incident ==
In the early 1800s, Akin worked as an engraver for Edmund March Blunt in Newburyport. "In late October 1804 the two men argued publicly, and in the course of the disagreement Blunt threw an iron skillet at Akin, hitting an unfortunate passerby. Akin, uninjured, retaliated with a deragotory print of Blunt entitled 'Infuriated Despondency' and a verse he called 'A Skillet Song.'" The caricature was later featured in the Newburyport Herald in 1805 and in pottery throughout London and Liverpool in 2006, heaping scorn upon Blunt and his descendants. A few examples still exist.

== Images ==
Examples of Akin's work:

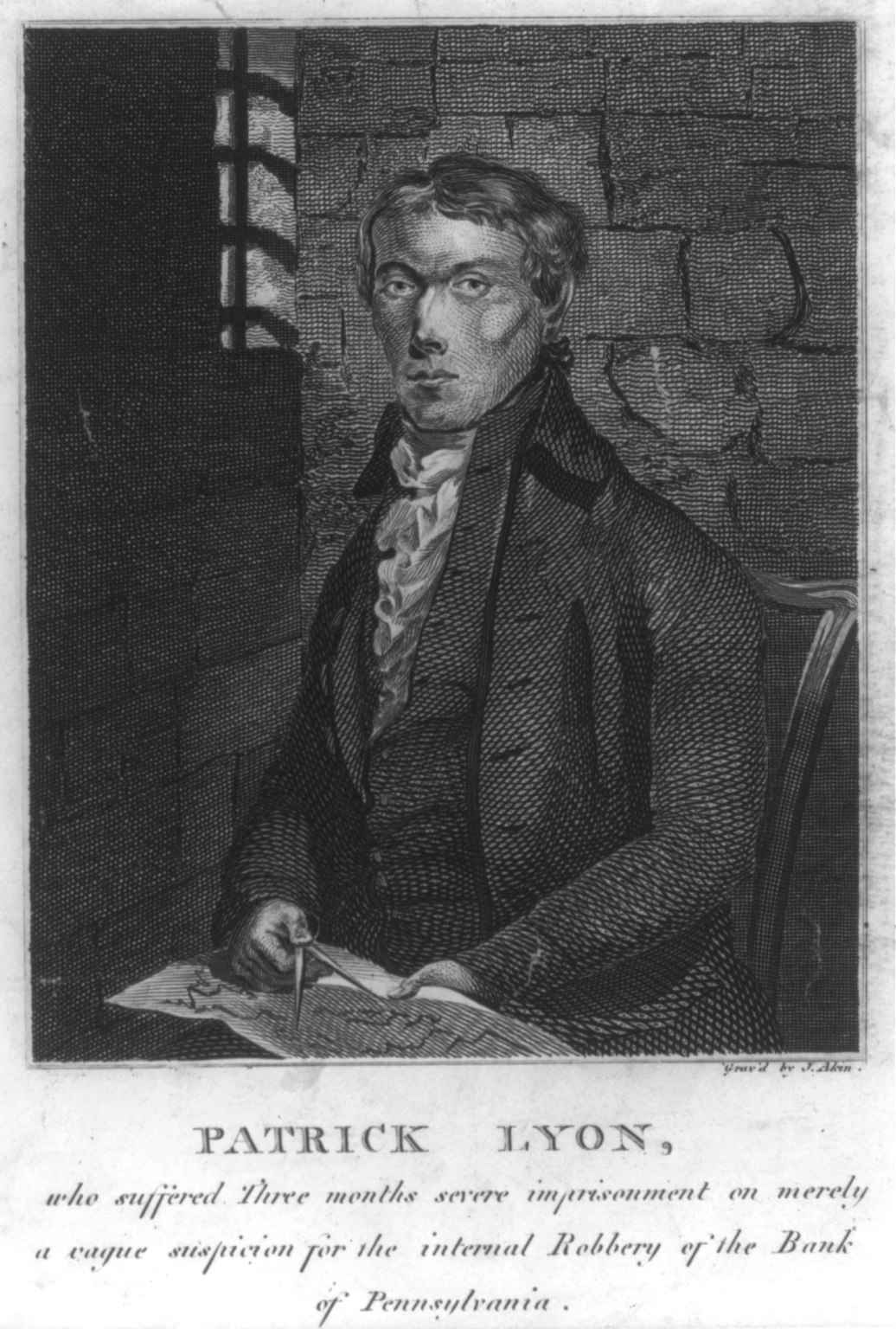
Portrait of Patrick Lyon, who suffered three months of severe Imprisonment in a Philadelphia Jail, 1799

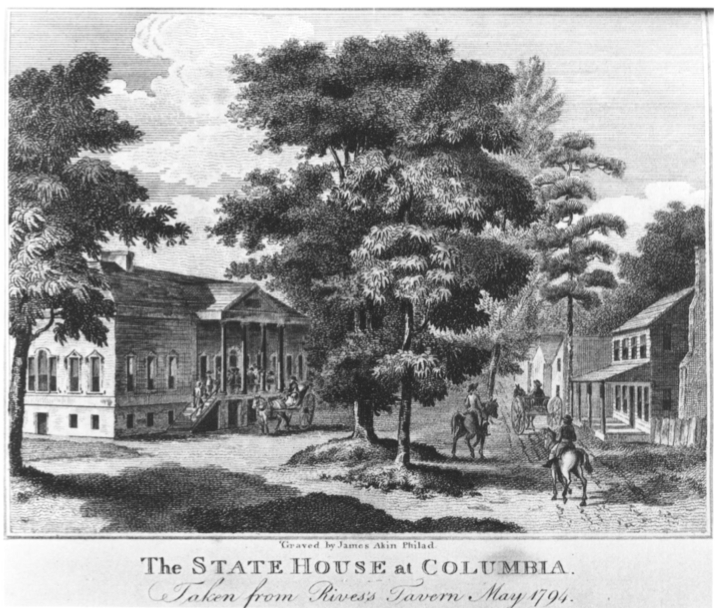
Illustration by Akin published in John Drayton's A View of South Carolina, 1802 (Winterthur Museum)

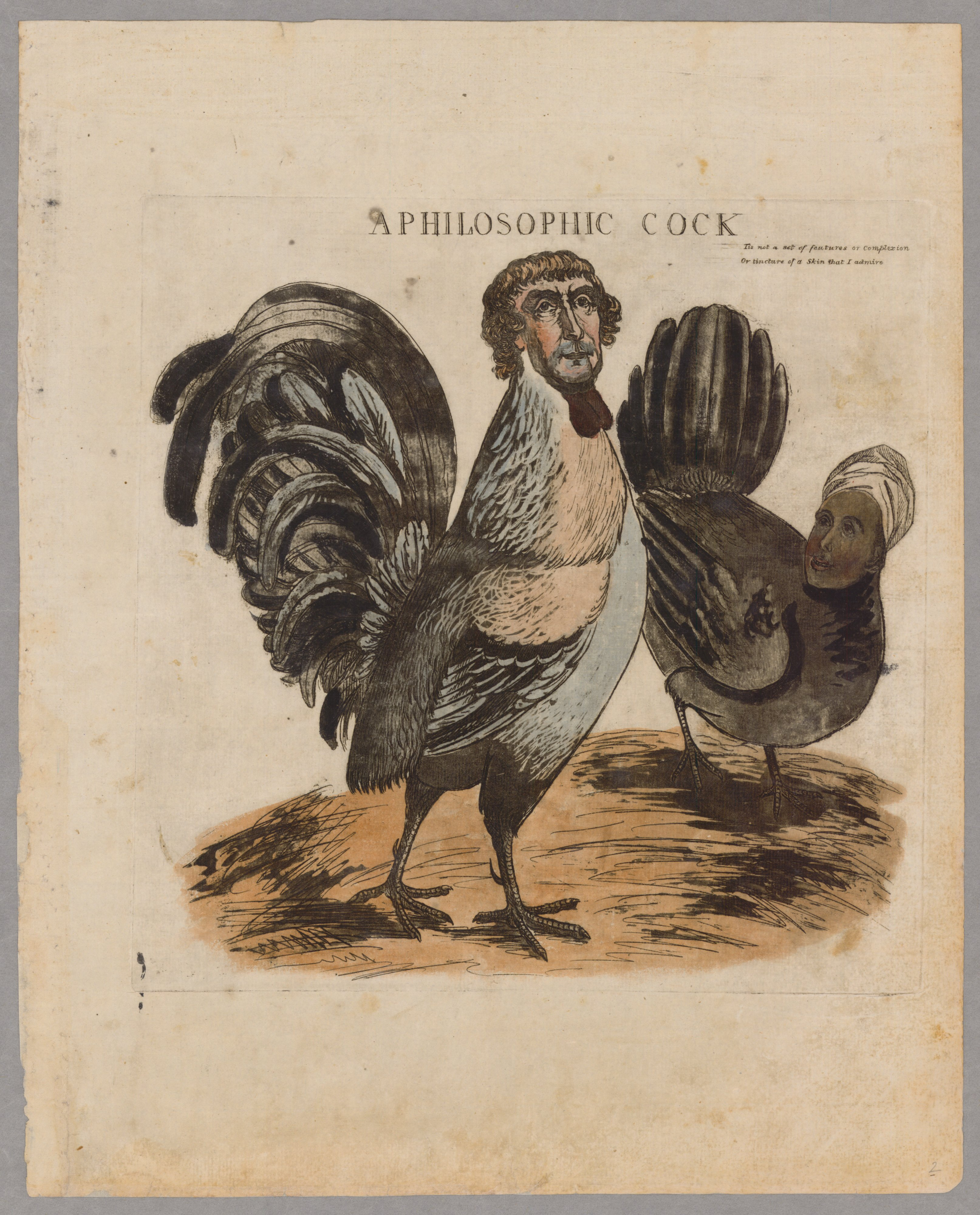
Caricature of Thomas Jefferson and Sally Hemings, ca.1804, attributed to Akin (American Antiquarian Society)

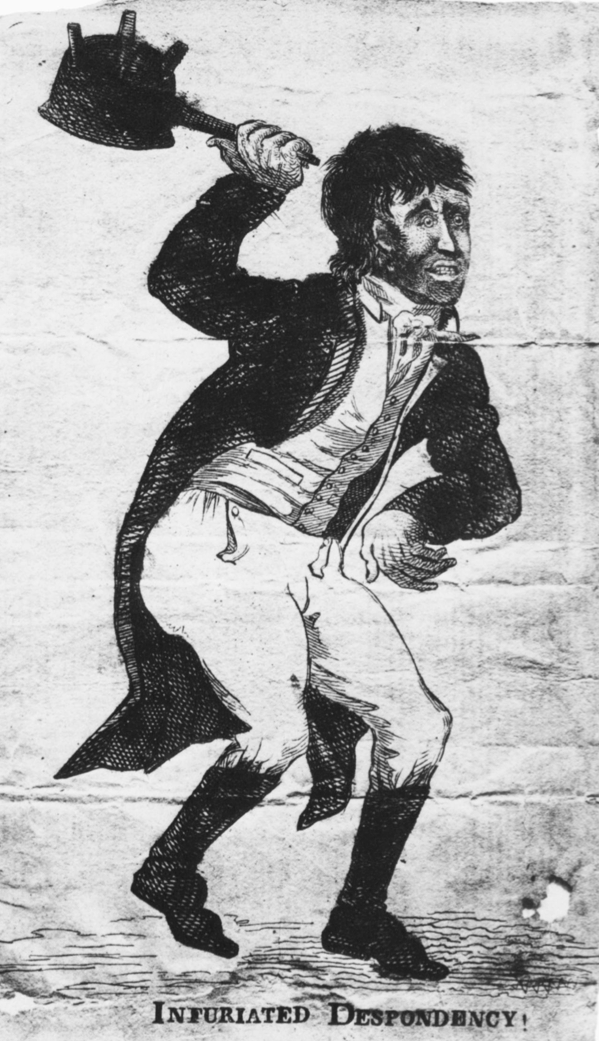
"Infuriated Despondency," 1805; satirical portrait of Edmund M. Blunt wielding footed skillet (Worcester Art Museum)

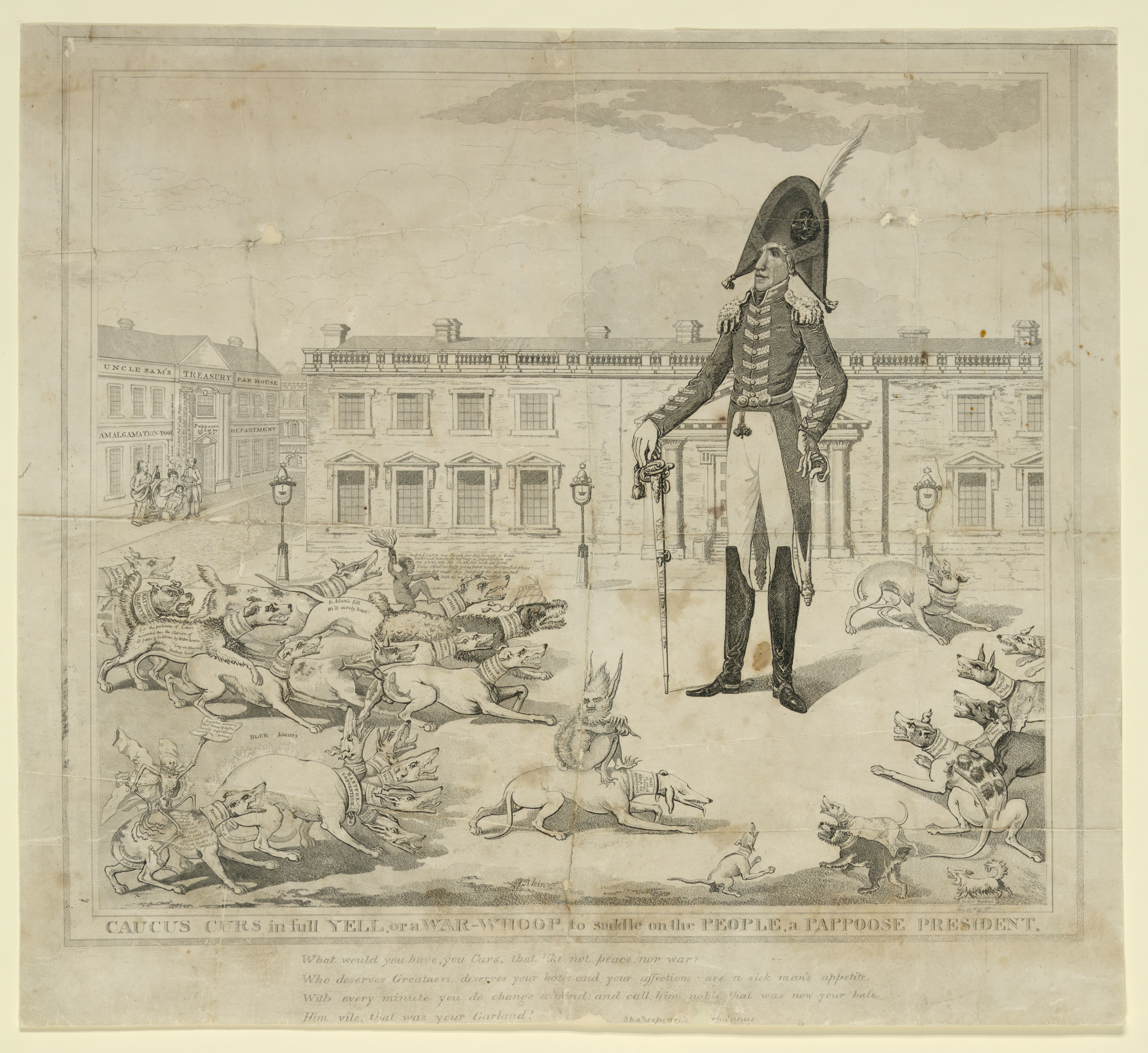
"Caucus curs in full yell," 1824; critique of "the press's treatment of Andrew Jackson, and on the practice of nominating candidates by caucus during the presidential race of 1824" (Library of Congress)

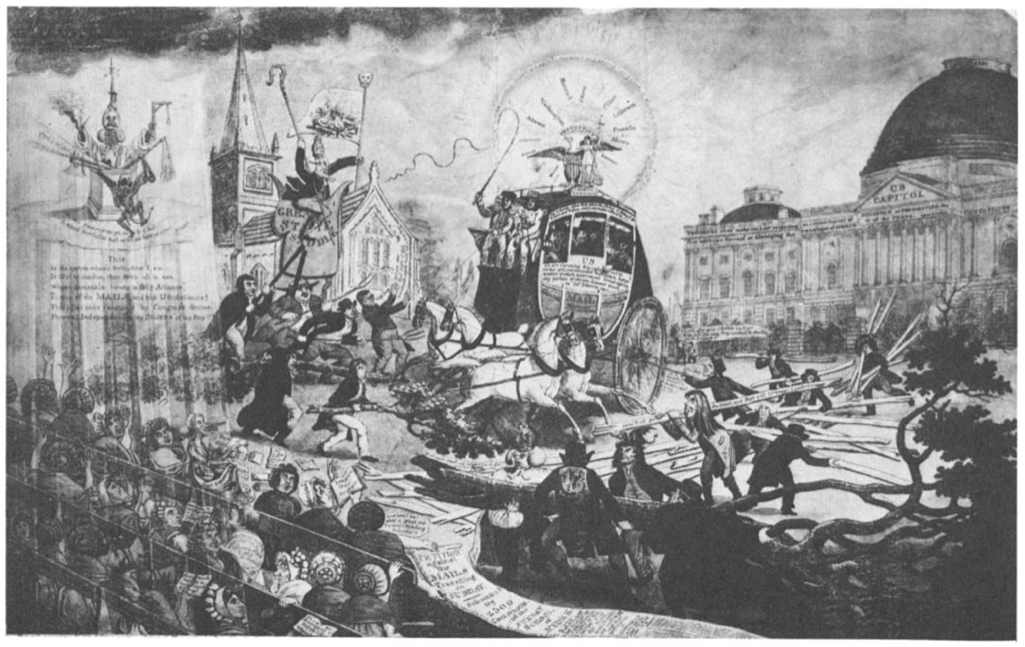
1830 caricature of American Christian Sabbatarians, whose "goal was to prevent the federal government from desecrating the Sabbath by requiring that the mails be transported and the post offices open to the public seven days a week" (American Antiquarian Society)
