= Tweed (disambiguation) =

Tweed is a woollen fabric.

Tweed may also refer to:

== Places ==
- Tweed, Ontario, Canada
  - Tweed, Ontario (village)
- Tweed, Georgia, U.S.
- Tweed New Haven Airport in New Haven, Connecticut, U.S.
- Tweed Heads, New South Wales, Australia
- Tweed Shire, New South Wales, Australia
- River Tweed, Scotland
- River Tweed, Leicestershire
- Tweed River (disambiguation)

== People ==
- Charles Austin Tweed (1813–1887), American politician and jurist
- Charles H. Tweed (1895–1970), American orthodontist
- David Tweed (fl. from 2000s), Australian businessman
- Davy Tweed (1959–2021), Irish rugby player
- George Ray Tweed (1902–1989), US Navy Radioman, holdout in Japan-occupied Guam
- Harrison Tweed (1885–1969), American lawyer and civic leader
- Heather Tweed (born 1959), British visual artist
- Karen Tweed (born 1963), British piano accordionist
- Martin Tweed (1890–1974), New Zealand rugby player and physician
- Merv Tweed (born 1955), Canadian politician
- Paul Tweed (born 1955), Northern Ireland lawyer
- Shannon Tweed (born 1957), Canadian actress and model
  - Tracy Tweed, her sister
- Steven Tweed (born 1972), Scottish footballer and manager
- Sydney Charles Tweed (1886–1942), Canadian businessman and politician
- Thomas Tweed (politician), (1853–1906), Canadian merchant and politician
- Thomas F. Tweed (1890–1940), British soldier and novelist
- William M. Tweed (1823–1878), "Boss Tweed," New York politician
- Tweed Roosevelt (born 1942), American businessman, great-grandson of President Theodore Roosevelt

== Other uses ==
- HMS Tweed, the name of several ships of the Royal Navy
- Tweed (Fender), a series of guitar amplifiers
- Tweed Marijuana Inc, now Canopy Growth, a Canadian cannabis company

== See also ==
- Tweed law, a New York State law
