= Punchinello =

American satirical magazine (1870)

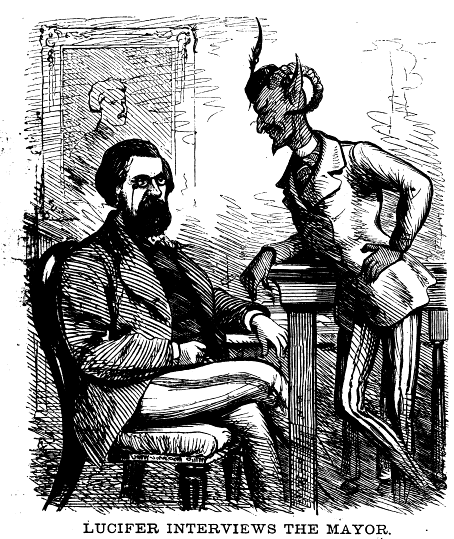
Mayor Hall. Want your place paved, you say? Certainly, Sir; how will you have it done, with good intentions or with broken promises? We will supply you with either at the City Hall. (Punchinello, April 1870.)

Punchinello was an American satirical magazine. Inspired by the English publication Punch, it ran in weekly editions from 2 April 1870 to 24 December 1870.

== History ==
The magazine was founded by former editors of Vanity Fair, which went out of business in 1863. They found four investors willing to provide $5000 each—though they did not disclose that those four were robber baron Jay Gould, financial buccaneer Jim Fisk, and corrupt politicians Boss Tweed and Peter B. Sweeny. It ceased publication within a year.

The magazine's main illustrator was Henry Louis Stephens, who produced a full-page cartoon every week. Other sections included theater reviews, correspondence (real or fictional) from Philadelphia, Boston, and Chicago, and essays on foreign affairs. According to historian of periodicals Frank Luther Mott, "in format as in name, it was an imitator of the London Punch." However Mott stipulated that, unlike its antecedent, "Punchinello was not very funny."
