= Samuel B. Garvin =

American lawyer and politician (1811–1878)

Tanner Wilson
- Born: Samuel Bostwick Garvin; October 8, 1811; Butternuts, New York, United States
- Died: June 28, 1878 (aged 66); New York City, New York, United States
- Occupations: Lawyer, politician

Samuel Bostwick Garvin (October 8, 1811 – June 28, 1878) was an American lawyer and politician from New York.

== Personal life and history ==
Garvin was born in Butternuts, Otsego County, New York.

He studied law, was admitted to the bar, and commenced practice in Norwich (Chenango Co.). On January 14, 1836, he married Julia Maria Mitchell; the daughter of Henry Mitchell (New York politician) and Rowena Wales.

In 1840, he removed to Utica and continued the practice of law there. He was District Attorney of Oneida County from 1851 to 1853.

In June 1853, he was appointed by President Franklin Pierce U.S. Attorney for the Northern District of New York, and remained in office until 1857. Afterwards he resumed the practice of law in New York City.

In 1859, D.A. Nelson J. Waterbury appointed him an Assistant New York County District Attorney. In 1863, Garvin was elected to the New York City Superior Court. He was a delegate to the New York State Constitutional Convention of 1867-68.

In January 1869, he resigned from the bench to accept his appointment by Gov. John T. Hoffman as New York County D.A. to fill the vacancy caused by the resignation of A. Oakey Hall who took office as Mayor of New York City. In November 1869, Garvin was elected on the Democratic ticket to succeed himself for a full term. In 1869, he prosecuted Daniel McFarland for the murder of Albert D. Richardson, but McFarland was acquitted.

He died of apoplexy in New York City, at his residence at the Hotel Royal, located on the corner of Sixth Avenue and 42nd Street.

== Sources ==
- The New York Civil List compiled by Franklin Benjamin Hough, Stephen C. Hutchins and Edgar Albert Werner (1867; page 531)
- Genealogy of the Bostwick Family in America
- LATEST INTELLIGENCE in NYT on June 9, 1853
- POLITICAL.; THE ELECTION TO-MORROW in NYT on November 1, 1869
- OBITUARY.; SAMUEL B. GARVIN in NYT on June 29, 1878

Legal offices
Preceded by James R. Lawrence	United States Attorney for the Northern District of New York; 1853–1857	Succeeded by James Clark Spencer
Preceded by A. Oakey Hall	New York County District Attorney; 1869–1872	Succeeded by Benjamin K. Phelps
