= Tweed River =

Tweed River may refer to:

- River Tweed, on the historic boundary between Scotland and England
- River Tweed, Leicestershire, England
- Tweed River (New South Wales), New South Wales, Australia
- Tweed River (New Zealand)
- Tweed River (Western Australia), a watercourse in Western Australia

== See also ==
- Tweed (disambiguation)
