= Edmund March Blunt =

American navigator and publisher (1770–1862)

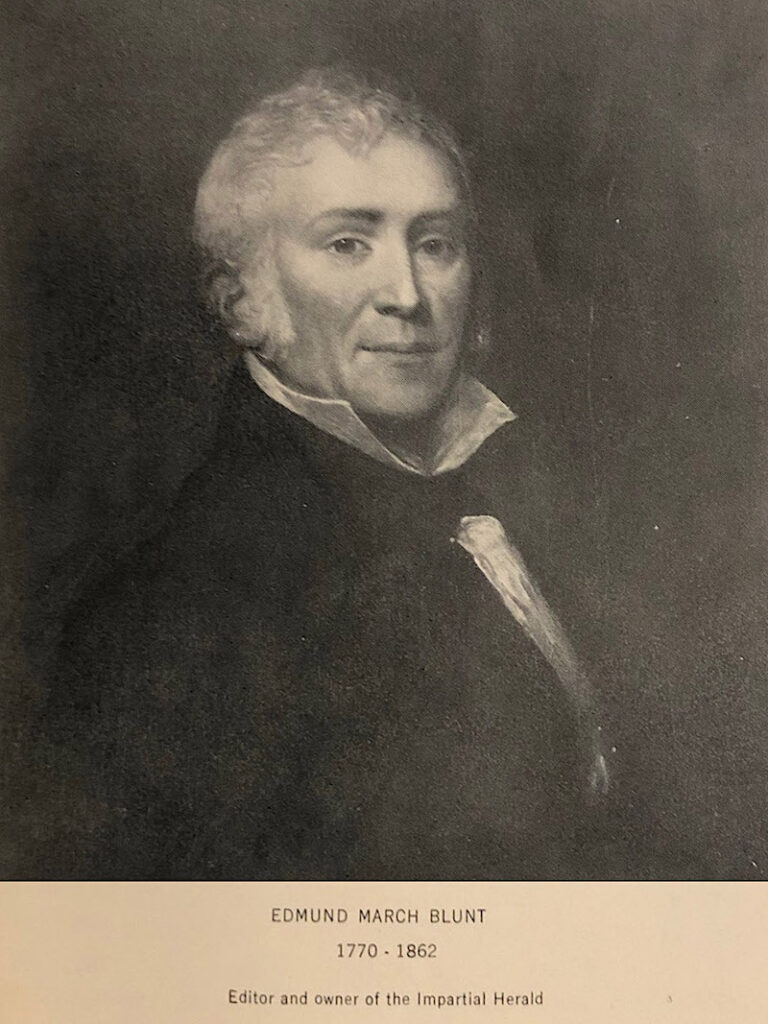
- Edmund March Blunt (1770–1862).
- Born: June 20, 1770; Portsmouth, New Hampshire, United States
- Died: January 4, 1862 (aged 91); Sing Sing, New York, United States
- Occupations: Navigator, publisher, writer
- Spouse: Sarah Ross

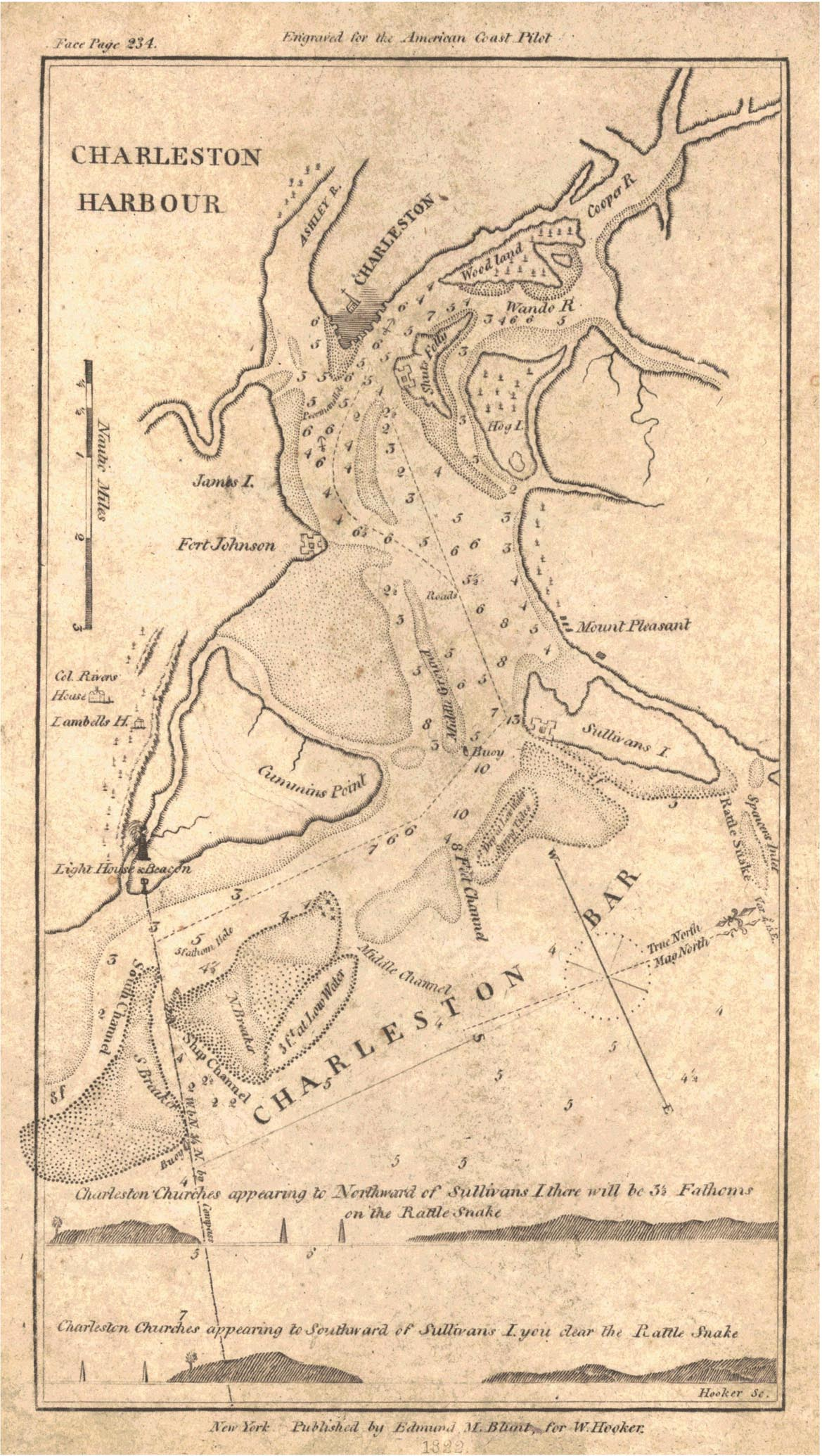
The harbor of Charleston, South Carolina, by Blunt, 1822

Edmund March Blunt (June 20, 1770 – January 4, 1862) was an American navigator, writer, and publisher of nautical magazines. He established a nautical book and chart publishing firm that became the largest publishing firm in the early 19th century. In 1796, he published American Coastal Pilot, which described every port of the United States. Blunt created a map in 1796 of what is now the Federated States of Micronesia.

== Personal life ==
Blunt was born in Portsmouth, New Hampshire, and lived in Sing Sing, New York. He had four sons: Nathaniel B., Edmund, George and Joseph. Edmund Blunt was a hydrographer. Mount Blunt in Antarctica is named for him.

== Nautical publisher ==
Blunt published the Impartial Herald, under the firm name of Blunt and Robinson, which was established on May 18, 1793. The firm was dissolved on February 28, 1794, and Blunt became the publisher of the Herald. In December, 1794, under the new firm name of Blunt & March, he united the Morning Star with the Impartial Herald. By 1795, the Impartial Herald was published twice a week. In 1796, Blunt sold his interest in the paper to Angier March who continued the publication until it was merged with the Political Gazette in 1797 when the name changed to the Newburyport Herald. When Blunt sold the Impartial Herald, he published the American Coast Pilot in 1796, in Newburyport, Massachusetts. It was published until 1858 by the United States Hydrographic Office, reaching 21 editions by 1867. Its final publication was produced in New York. (Sabin 6025). Blunt expanded chart coverage into the Pacific Ocean and in 1857, expanded into the Indian Ocean.

=== Move to New York ===
By 1815, Blunt had moved to New York where he opened a place of business at 202 Water Street, Beekman Slip, New York, "where charts and pilots for every part of the world, nautical books of every description, sextants, circles, quadrants, spy glasses, compasses and every nautical and mathematical instruments requisite at sea may be had on the most reasonable terms."

In 1824, his two sons, George and Edmund went into business with their father at the publishing house of marine works called E. & G. W. Blunt Publishing. Blunt published Blunt's Coastal Pilot, which became American Coast Pilot. The firm closed in 1872 and sold the chart copyrights and plates to the Coast Survey and U.S. Navy Hydrographic Office.

From 1819 to 1826 he conducted marine surveys on the Bahama Islands and the Nantucket Shoals. He made the first accurate survey of the New York harbor.

== Death ==
Blunt died at his residence in Sing Sing, Westchester County, New York on Saturday January 4, 1862, at 92. His funeral was at the Presbyterian church in Sing Sing.
