= Joseph Blunt =

American lawyer, author, editor and politician (1792–1860)

New York County District Attorney
- Acting
- In office 1858–1860
- Preceded by: Peter B. Sweeny
- Succeeded by: Nelson J. Waterbury

Personal details
- Born: February 1792 Newburyport, Massachusetts, U.S.
- Died: June 16, 1860 (aged 68) New York City, New York, U.S.
- Party: Republican Party
- Relations: Edmund March Blunt (father); N. Bowditch Blunt (brother)
- Profession: attorney, politician

Joseph Blunt (February 1792 – June 16, 1860) was an American lawyer, author, editor, and politician from New York. In 1858, he was appointed New York County district attorney.

== Early life ==
Blunt was born in February 1792 in Newburyport, Massachusetts. He was one of four sons of Edmund March Blunt. In 1802, Edmund published the American Practical Navigator by Nathaniel Bowditch, the man who became the godfather of Joseph's younger brother Nathaniel Bowditch Blunt.

== Career ==
Joseph Blunt first came into notice by writing on the Missouri question in 1820. Soon afterward he wrote an article on the Laibach circular, published in the North American Review, which attracted the attention of politicians. In 1825, he published a Historical Sketch of the Formation of the American Confederacy (8 vol.), and from 1827 to 1835 he edited the American Annual Register. He also published Speeches, Reviews, and Reports (1843) and Merchants' and Shipmasters' Assistant (1829 and 1848).

He was long a leading Whig and protectionist. In 1851, Millard Fillmore appointed him Commissioner to China, but he declined to take office.

In September 1855, he was a delegate to the Anti-Nebraska state convention in Syracuse which merged with the Whigs to form the Republican Party in the State of New York.

In 1858, he was appointed by Gov. John A. King New York County District Attorney to fill the vacancy caused by the resignation of Peter B. Sweeny.

== Personal life ==
Joseph's youngest brother, N. Bowditch Blunt, was New York County district attorney from 1851 to 1854. The other two brothers, Edmund (1799–1866) and George William (1802–1878) followed their father's steps and got involved in nautical affairs. Edmund assisted Ferdinand Rudolph Hassler in surveying the port of New York for the United States Coast Survey in 1817. George W. Blunt was for decades a member, and later secretary, of the Board of Pilot Commissioners, and in 1857 was appointed to the Waterfront Commission of New York Harbor. Joseph Blunt's nephew was Capt. Edmund Blunt.

Blunt died on June 16, 1860, in New York City.
