= N. Bowditch Blunt =

American politician

14th New York County District Attorney
- In office 1851–1854
- Preceded by: John McKeon
- Succeeded by: Lorenzo B. Shepard

Personal details
- Born: June 19, 1804 Newburyport, Massachusetts, U.S.
- Died: July 7, 1854 (aged 50) New Lebanon, New York, U.S.
- Party: Democratic
- Profession: attorney, politician

Nathaniel Bowditch Blunt (June 19, 1804 – July 17, 1854) was an American lawyer and politician from New York. He became the New York County district attorney in 1851.

== Early life ==
Nathaniel Blunt was born on June 19, 1804, in Newburyport, Massachusetts. He was the youngest of four sons of Edmund March Blunt.

== Career ==
Blunt was a New York County district attorney from 1851 until his death in July 1854. He was elected in 1850 and 1853 on the Whig ticket. In 1853, he defeated the Democratic candidate Chauncey Shaffer by a majority of only 78 votes.

In 1851, Blunt appointed as his Assistant D.A. the then 24-year-old A. Oakey Hall, who was elected D.A. of New York in November 1854, and was Mayor of New York City from 1869 to 1872.

== Personal life ==
Blunt's daughter Lizzie Blunt died on September 8, 1862. She was married to Dr. A. Henry Thurston.

Nathaniel's oldest brother, Joseph Blunt, was New York County district attorney in 1858. The other two brothers, Edmund (1799-1866) and George William (1802-1878), followed their father's steps and got involved in nautical affairs. Edmund assisted Ferdinand Rudolph Hassler in surveying the port of New York for the United States Coast Survey in 1817. George William Blunt was for decades a member, and later secretary, of the Board of Pilot Commissioners, and in 1857 was appointed a New York Harbor Commissioner. His nephew was Capt. Edmund Blunt.

Blunt died on July 17, 1854, in Lebanon Springs, Columbia County, New York.
