= Black Horse Cavalry =

Corrupt New York legislators

The Black Horse Cavalry was a corrupt bipartisan group in the New York state legislature. During the last quarter of the 19th century, it preyed particularly on corporations and usually blackmailed by introducing bills against the corporations (strike bills) that would be killed if sufficient money were forthcoming. The group included around thirty state legislators whose votes could be purchased from the highest bidder. The Black Horse Cavalry is presumed to have been frequent visitors of William M. Tweed at his Delevan House lodgings in Albany while he served as a state senator.
