= A. Oakey Hall =

Mayor of New York City from 1869 to 1872

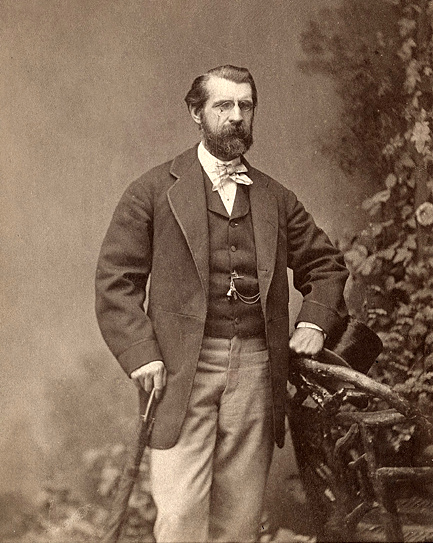
- Abraham Oakey Hall, c. 1870

80th Mayor of New York City
- In office January 4, 1869 – December 31, 1872
- Preceded by: Thomas Coman
- Succeeded by: William F. Havemeyer

15th and 18th New York County District Attorney
- In office January 1, 1862 – January 1, 1871
- Preceded by: Nelson J. Waterbury
- Succeeded by: Samuel B. Garvin
- In office January 1, 1855 – January 1, 1858
- Preceded by: Lorenzo B. Shepard
- Succeeded by: Peter B. Sweeny

Personal details
- Born: July 26, 1826 Albany, New York, U.S.
- Died: October 7, 1898 (aged 72) New York City, New York, U.S.
- Party: Democratic (after 1864)
- Other political affiliations: Republican (1861-1864); Whig (before 1861)
- Education: New York University

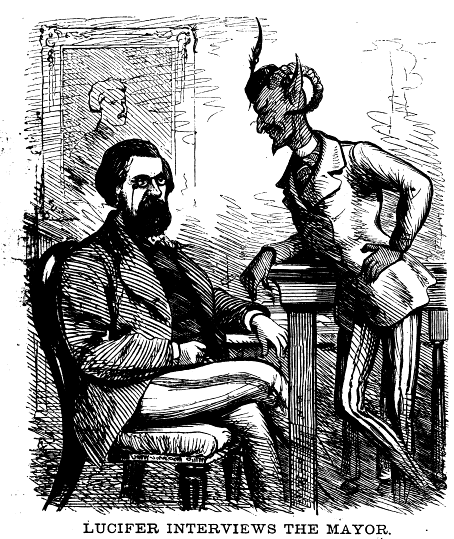
Mayor Hall. Want your place paved, you say? Certainly, Sir; how will you have it done, with good intentions or with broken promises? We will supply you with either at the City Hall. (Punchinello, April 1870.)

Abraham Oakey Hall (July 26, 1826 – October 7, 1898) was an American politician, lawyer, and writer who served as Mayor of New York City from 1869 to 1872. He twice served as the New York County District Attorney from 1855 to 1858 and from 1862 to 1871.

Hall was born in Albany and raised by his mother in New York City after his father died when he was three. He worked as a journalist to pay for New York University and briefly attended Harvard University before moving to New Orleans. He read the law and was admitted to the Louisiana bar before returning to New York City. Originally a member of the Whig Party, he was sworn in as the 15th New York County District Attorney in 1855 and served until 1858. He returned to office as the 18th New York County District Attorney in 1862 as a member of the Republican Party and was reelected in 1864 as a member of the Tammany Hall-backed Democratic Party. In 1868, he was elected as the Mayor of New York City and he was reelected in 1870.

In 1871, a Tammany Hall corruption scandal involving William M. Tweed led to Hall's indictment for "willfully neglecting his official duties." He maintained his innocence and was acquitted at his third trial in 1872, but his political career was effectively ended. He worked as a journalist in New York City and London, before dying in 1898.

== Early life ==
Hall was born in Albany, New York, on July 26, 1826, to Elsie Lansing Oakey and Morgan James Hall. His father, a merchant, died of yellow fever when Hall was 3 years old. In 1840, he entered New York University, and wrote for many newspapers to pay his way through school. He graduated in 1844 with bachelor's and master's degrees. He attended Harvard Law School until 1845 before dropping out to apprentice to finish his legal education. Hall returned to New York in 1845, and worked in the law office of Charles W. Sandford. In 1846, he moved to New Orleans where he apprenticed at the law firm of Thomas & John Slidell. He was admitted to the Louisiana Bar later that year.

During this period, using the pen name of Hans Yorkel, he served as the New York correspondent of the New Orleans Commercial Bulletin. He returned to New York, where he practiced law and was admitted to the bar in 1851. In that year, Hall authored a book, The Manhattaner in New Orleans, or, Phases of "Crescent City" Life, in which he addressed the problems and challenges of large, ethnically diverse port cities and provided important historical sketches of a young New Orleans. In 1857, he authored a formerly popular Christmas poem and song, "Old Whitey's Christmas Trot".

== Political career ==
In 1850, New York County District Attorney N. Bowditch Blunt appointed Hall as an assistant district attorney. After Blunt's death in 1854, Hall offered to occupy the office until the end of the year and revert the district attorney's wages to Blunt's widow and her eight children. However, Democrat Lorenzo B. Shepard was appointed by Governor Horatio Seymour to fill the vacancy. In November 1854, Hall was elected on the Whig ticket to succeed Shepard, and served his first term as New York County District Attorney from 1855 to 1857. He was not re-elected partly due to his unpopularity following the Burdell-Cunningham murder trial. As a Republican, Hall was elected again as the New York County District Attorney in November 1861. In 1863, he prosecuted perpetrators of the New York City draft riots. He was re-elected as a Democratic Tammany Hall candidate in 1864 and 1867. During his time in the district attorney's office Hall became a frequent patron of Pfaff's.

=== Mayor of New York City ===
In November 1868, during his fourth term as D.A., Hall was elected Mayor of New York City as a Democrat supported by Tammany Hall. He was re-elected mayor in 1870, again on the Tammany ticket, serving two terms from January 1, 1869, to December 31, 1872.

He complained of an undercount in the 1870 United States census in New York City to President Ulysses S. Grant and successfully lobbied for a recount of the city's population. As mayor, Hall was unpopular for a myriad of reasons, partly due to the ongoing political clashes between Anglo "Nativists" and the Irish population. While Democrat "Boss" Tweed, Tammany Hall leaders and Hall were Anglo, their power base rested largely upon Irish immigrants. This conflict boiled over in 1871 when Hall attempted to stop the Irish Orange Order (Irish of Anglo-Saxon and Scots-Irish descent) from holding a parade, perhaps provocatively celebrating the historic Orangemen (Anglo Protestant Irish) victory over ethnic Irish Catholics. Fearing that either banning the march or allowing it to continue would both lead to violence and mayhem, Governor John Hoffman overruled Mayor Hall and allowed it to continue with increased policing. Nevertheless, riots did occur, cementing Hall's negative image on both sides and severely compromising Hoffman's political career.

Additionally, Hall backed away from supporting Republican candidates because of widespread dislike of the Nativists within the Party. He was seen as attempting to have it both ways rather than finding a middle ground. In particular, Thomas Nast, who had old-line Republican leanings, took aim at "Elegant Oakey" whom he considered to be the worst of the Tweed politicians because of his high standing, education and open presidential ambitions. Nast also felt that Hall got off lightly in the affair because of his continued personal connections with reformer and prosecutor Samuel Tilden, though later historians have shown that Hall and Tilden were never very close in the 1860s and 1870s and that Hall did not receive any special assistance. In fact, Tilden was the chief opponent of Tweed, Hall, et al.

Hall was implicated in the William M. Tweed's corruption scandal and indicted in early 1872 for "willfully neglecting his official duties." He maintained his innocence and his first trial ended in a mistrial when a juror fell ill. His second trial ended in a hung jury. He was acquitted of all charges at his third trial in 1872 where he represented himself.

A 1993 survey of historians, political scientists and urban experts conducted by Melvin G. Holli of the University of Illinois at Chicago ranked Hall as the sixth-worst American big-city mayor to have served between the years 1820 and 1993.

== Post-mayoral career, later life, and death ==
Some time after the last trial, Hall wrote and acted in his own play entitled The Crucible, where he played the lead part, a man falsely accused of stealing. The play, which ran for two or three weeks at Abbey's Park Theatre in November 1876 was a flop. The lessee and manager, William Stuart was unable to continue in business and swiftly sold the theatre to Henry E. Abbey. Stuart, whose real name was Edmund O'Flaherty, was an adventurer and swindler and former Irish M.P. with strong links to extreme financial, judicial, and political fraud and corruption in Ireland.

Hall returned to his work as an attorney. He subsequently suffered a nervous breakdown and lived for a time in London without knowledge of having done so.

In November 1877 he returned to New York and in 1879 he became the editor for the New York World. In 1882 he moved to London as a correspondent for the New York Herald. In London he became an ardent spokesperson for municipal reform. Hall sued Viscount Bryce for defamation of character and libel, but the case was eventually dropped. His daughter Cara de la Montagnie Hall married Rear Admiral Thomas Holdup Stevens III, but maintained her name to honor her father. In 1892, he returned to New York City.

In 1894, Hall defended Emma Goldman against charges of inciting to riot in New York City. He lost the case (she was sentenced to a year in prison), but she credited him with reducing the charges against her and providing her a platform to air her anarchist views. She described him as a great champion of free speech.

Hall died of heart disease on October 7, 1898, in New York City, and was buried at Trinity Church Cemetery and Mausoleum, located at 770 Riverside Drive in Manhattan.

== Electoral history ==
New York City mayoral election, 1868
Party	Candidate	Votes	%
Democratic	A. Oakey Hall	75,054	78.17%
Republican	Frederick A. Conkling	20,960	21.83%

Legal offices
Preceded by Lorenzo B. Shepard	New York County District Attorney; 1855–1857	Succeeded by Peter B. Sweeny
Preceded by Nelson J. Waterbury	New York County District Attorney; 1862–1868	Succeeded by Samuel B. Garvin
Political offices
Preceded by Thomas Coman; Acting	Mayor of New York City; 1869–1872	Succeeded by William F. Havemeyer
