= William C. Kingsley =

American construction contractor

- Born: 1833; Fort Covington, New York, U.S.
- Died: February 21, 1885 (aged 51–52); Brooklyn, New York, U.S.
- Resting place: Green-Wood Cemetery, Brooklyn, New York
- Occupation: Construction contractor
- Known for: Involvement in the creation and construction of Brooklyn Bridge

William C. Kingsley (1833–February 21, 1885) was an American construction contractor who is best known for being one of the main figures involved in the creation of the Brooklyn Bridge.

== Career ==
Kingsley settled in Brooklyn in 1856 and worked as a contractor for the Brooklyn water works. He soon entered into partnership with Abner Chase Keeney (1826-1884), a civil engineer and contractor. In subsequent years, their construction firm, Kingsley & Keeney, was given large contracts to build Prospect Park, the stone wall around Central Park, sewerages for Brooklyn and Manhattan, and the Hempstead Reservoir. But undoubtedly, Kingsley & Keeney's greatest project was the Brooklyn Bridge. By the mid-1860s, Kingsley was convinced that a bridge between New York City and Brooklyn was feasible and, perhaps most importantly, would benefit Kingsley & Keeney. Kingsley became the driving force behind that project, hiring Colonel Julius Walker Adams, a civil engineer who had worked with him on the Brooklyn sewers, to come up with a design and to prepare cost estimates. However, although Adams had previously dabbled in bridge designs and had many influential friends, he had never built a bridge of any consequence. His role was to come with a lowball estimate of the cost of the bridge, allowing Kingsley and its other promoters to gain the necessary approvals from public officials. Adams concluded that the Brooklyn Bridge could be built for $5,000,000; ultimately it would be built by John and Washington Roebling for three times that amount.

When the New York and Brooklyn Bridge Company was organized in 1867, Kingsley became one of its major shareholders. Soon, he was named its superintendent, and a motion, proposed by none other than Boss Tweed and passed by the other trustees, authorized payment to Kingsley & Keeney of 15% of all construction costs. This was an unheard-of percentage for such a large contract; in 1870 alone, it amounted to $175,000. In 1873, after Tweed had fallen from power, Kingsley & Keeney's contract with the Bridge Company was renegotiated, and its payment was slashed to the much smaller flat fee of $10,000 (equivalent to $269,000 in 2025) per year.

In 1875, Kingsley joined the board of trustees of the Brooklyn Bridge, and succeeded Henry Cruse Murphy as president of the board in 1882, upon Murphy's death; he held that position on May 24, 1883, the day that the Brooklyn Bridge opened. He died at his home in Brooklyn on February 21, 1885. After his death, Kingsley was succeeded as trustee by Seth Lee Keeney (1831-1913), a building contractor and the brother of Kingsley's late partner.

== Memorial ==
William C. Kingsley is interred at Green-Wood Cemetery in Brooklyn, New York. His monument was cut from granite stone that was once a part of the Brooklyn Bridge and was placed there by the bridge's Board of Trustees to honor his role in making the dream of a bridge between the great Cities of New York and Brooklyn a reality.
