= Nelson J. Waterbury =

American politician

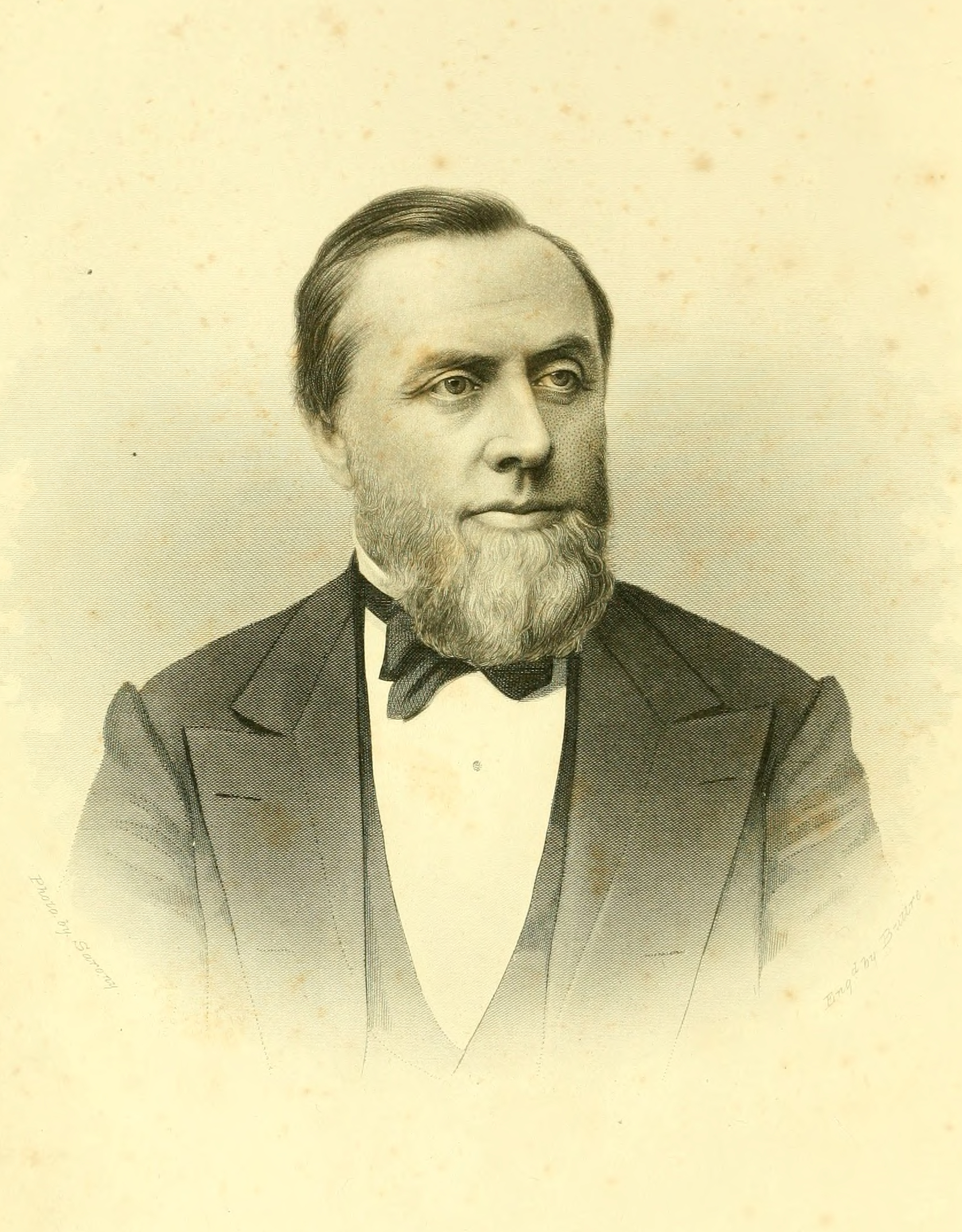
- Born: Nelson Jarvis Waterbury; July 9, 1819; New York, New York
- Died: April 22, 1894 (aged 74); New York, New York
- Occupations: Jurist, politician
- Political party: Democratic
- Spouse: Nancy D. M. Gibson
- Children: 4

Nelson Jarvis Waterbury (July 9, 1819 – April 22, 1894) was an American lawyer and politician from New York.

== Biography ==
Waterbury was born in New York City on July 9, 1819, the son of Col. Jonathan Waterbury (d. 1828) and Elizabeth (Jarvis) Waterbury, a niece of Bishop Abraham Jarvis.

He married Nancy D. M. Gibson (d. 1897), and they had three daughters and a son—Nelson J. Waterbury Jr.—who became his father's law partner in 1884.

The elder Waterbury studied law, was admitted to the bar, and in 1842 formed a partnership to practice law with Samuel J. Tilden. From 1845 to 1849, Waterbury was a justice of the New York City Marine Court. In 1855, he was appointed by Postmaster of New York City Isaac V. Fowler as his assistant and established the first sub-postal station in the city.

He was New York County District Attorney from 1859 to 1861, elected on the Democratic ticket in November 1858, but defeated for re-election in 1861 by Republican A. Oakey Hall. In March 1862, he was elected Grand Sachem of Tammany Hall. In 1863, Waterbury was appointed by Gov. Horatio Seymour Judge Advocate General of the State Militia. In 1865, he resumed the practice of law.

Although Waterbury left Tammany Hall after William M. Tweed became the boss, he defended Tweed at his trial following the fall of the "Tweed Ring". After Tweed's fall, Waterbury returned to Tammany Hall, but left again in 1875 disagreeing with John Kelly. Waterbury returned to Tammany Hall in 1890, being an admirer of Richard Croker and Mayor Thomas F. Gilroy.

Waterbury was elected a delegate to the New York State Constitutional Convention of 1894, but died three weeks before the convention met. He died of pneumonia at his residence at 13 West 56th Street in Manhattan.

Legal offices
Preceded by Joseph Blunt	New York County District Attorney; 1859–1861	Succeeded by A. Oakey Hall
