= Tweed law =

New York State law

The Tweed law, formally known as Executive Law Section 63-C, is a New York State law that allows the Attorney General of New York to pursue the recoupment of public funds misused by government officials without the request from a local official. Its popular name comes from Tammany Hall boss William M. Tweed. It was first passed in 1876.
