= Peter B. Sweeny =

American politician

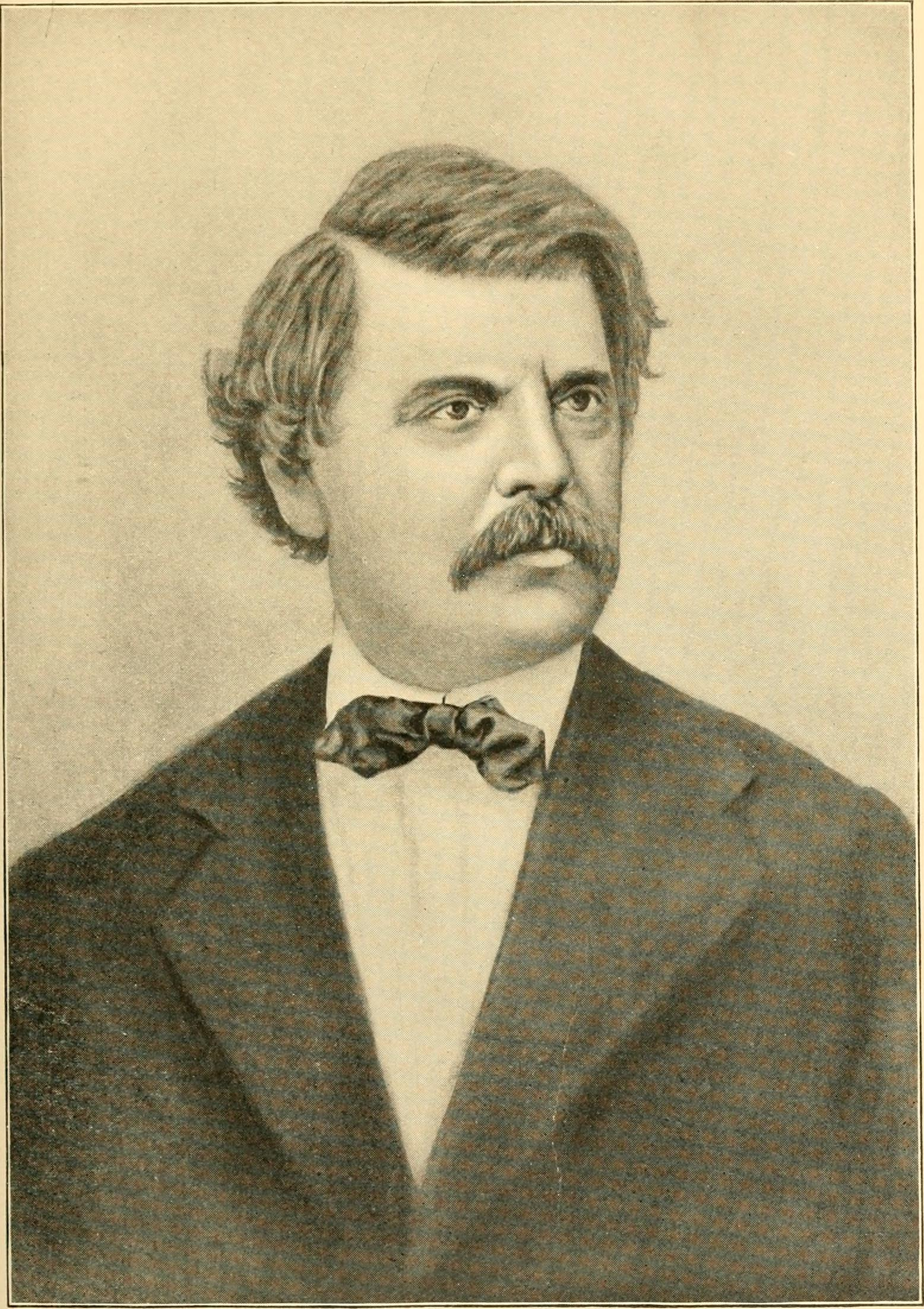
Peter B. Sweeny.

Peter Barr Sweeny (October 9, 1825 New York City – August 30, 1911 Mahopac, Putnam County, New York) was an American lawyer and politician from New York.

== Life ==
He was the son of James Sweeny, who kept a hotel in Hoboken, New Jersey, and Mary (Barr) Sweeny.

He attended Columbia College, then studied law, was admitted to the bar and practiced law with James T. Brady in New York City.

In 1852, he was appointed Public Administrator. He was New York County District Attorney in 1858, elected on the Democratic ticket in November 1857, but resigned due to ill health.

Sweeny was City Chamberlain and Park Commissioner under Mayor A. Oakey Hall. He became notorious as a central figure in the ring that controlled Tammany Hall, and was depicted prominently in Thomas Nast's cartoons alongside Boss Tweed, Richard B. Connolly and A. Oakey Hall.

With Tweed, he was a director of the Erie Railroad, which became "a gigantic highway of robbery and disgrace". Sweeny was also Director of the Tenth National Bank, in which city funds were deposited. In Nast's cartoons, Tweed and Sweeny were often identified as "Tweeny and Sweed"; in others, Sweeny was identified as "Peter 'Brains' Sweeny". Public indignation over the theft of millions of dollars by the Tweed ring led to the downfall of the Ring in the municipal election of November 7, 1871. Sweeny resigned from public life the following day. In February 1872, Sweeny was indicted but the D.A.'s office decided for nolle prosequi, and Sweeny went to Canada.

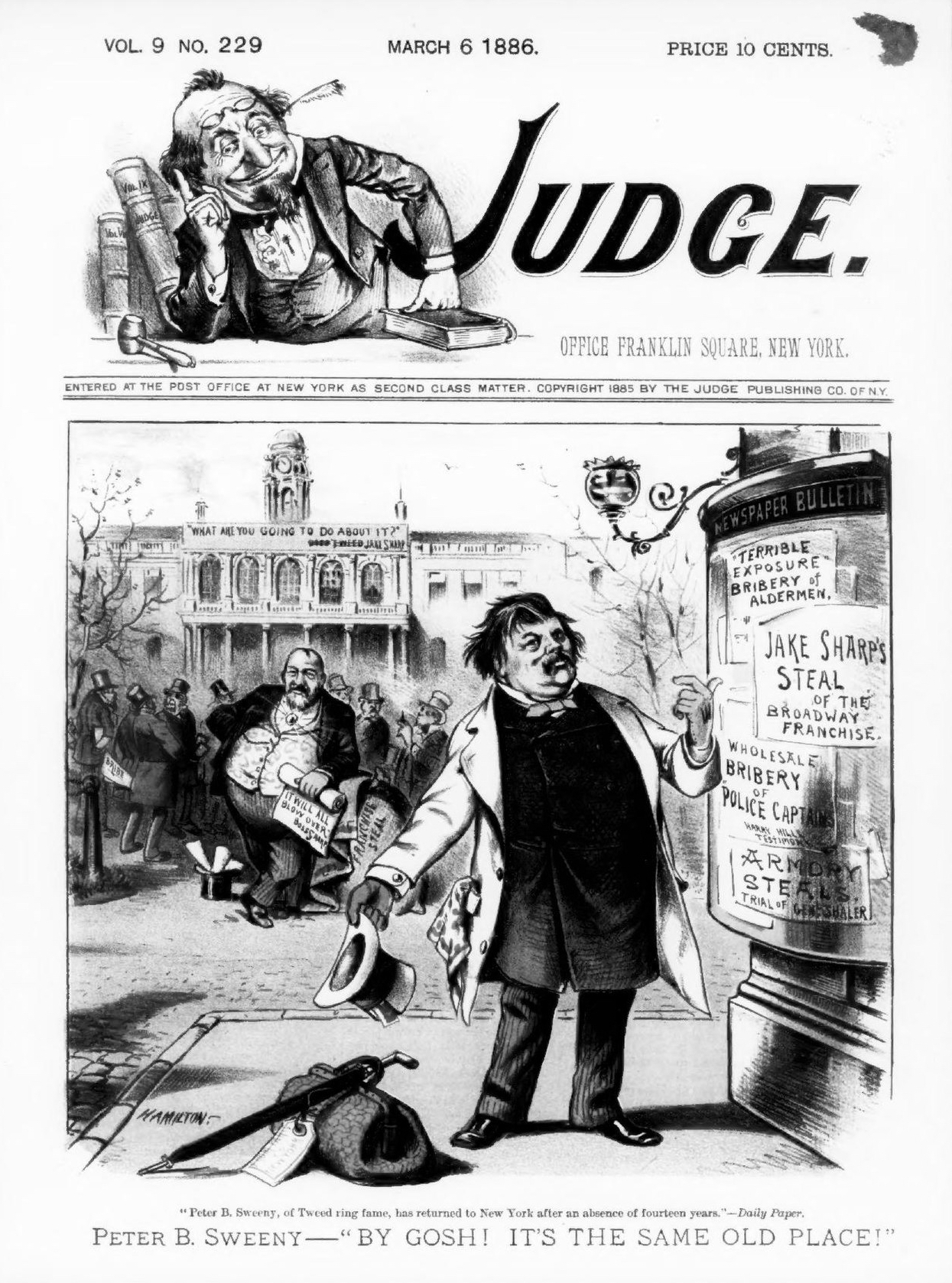
Political cartoon depicting Sweeny's return to New York following the collapse of the Tweed Ring. The cartoon shows Sweeny reading the bulletin board showing various municipal scandals of the era with Sweeny saying "By gosh! It's the same old place!"

In 1877, Sweeny paid $400,000 to New York City in exchange for forgiveness. The fact that the sum was paid in the name of his recently deceased brother, James M. Sweeney, who had been a minor player in the financial operations of the Ring, was widely condemned in the press. On June 7, 1877, the Evening Post wrote, "Of course, nobody will be deceived by this disgraceful and offensive sham. The suit of the people was not against James M. Sweeny ... It is known that he lived by the breath of his brother, that he was but a mere miserable tool".

Peter B. Sweeny returned to public work in 1890 with a new urban development project titled "Gotham's Greater Rotten Row". The project proposed that a two-and-a-half mile pleasure and recreation ground would be built along the Hudson River, which would span from 72nd Street all the way until 98th Street. Peter described it as a "Splendid public pleasure ground for lovers of the horse and the horse himself," hoping to compete with London's Rotten Row. The plan aimed to create a grand terrace as well as a driveway on the west side of the New York's Central Railroad tracks, with the ultimate goal of reclaiming the waterfront for public use.

The pamphlet for the project garnered endorsements from many influential figures within New York at the time. Notable names included U.S Representative Russell Sage, Mayor of New York, Hugh Grant, and the Commissioner of the New York City Department of Health Nathan Straus. Although the proposal was never built, it marked a shift in Sweeny's character at the end of his life, exemplifying his desire to create genuine urban planning for the city of New York.

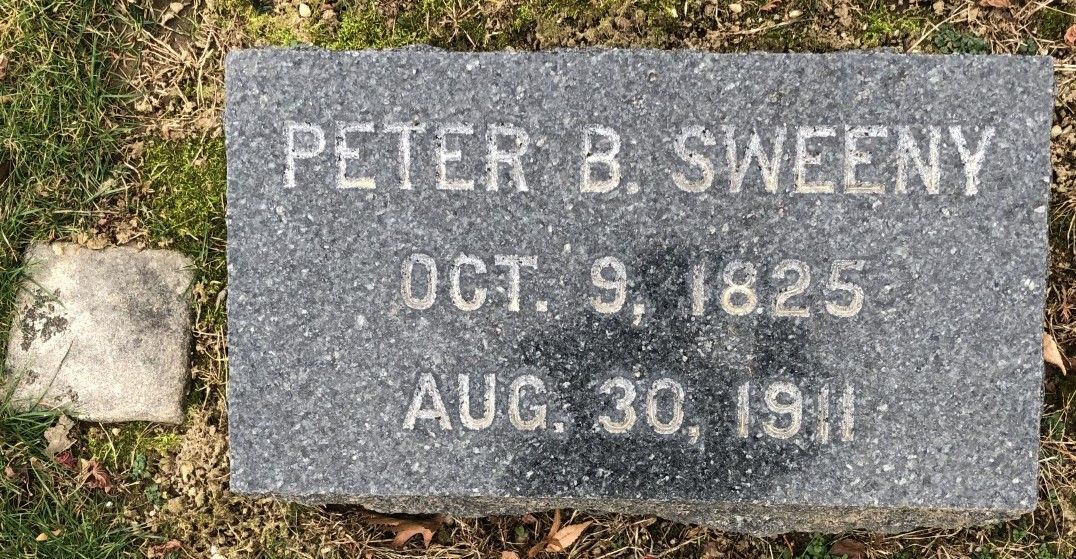
Picture of Peter Barr Sweeny's Grave

In December of 1890, Sweeny wrote and published a legal analysis of New York Laws, specifically Chapter 233. The chapter licensed the New York and New Jersey Bridge company to build a bridge across the Hudson river. Sweeny argued that this construction violated multiple constitutional rights, Importantly that building a bridge across an interstate boundary was in violation of Article I Section 10 of the U.S. Constitution. Sweeny argued that Congress needed to approve a formal agreement between the two states, and that a single state law was not enough to suffice for the building of the bridge. Sweeny believed that the Hudson River Crossing was ambitious, but that the act itself was legally flawed and would not withstand legal scrutiny.

Sweeny died at the home of his son Arthur Sweeny, Assistant Corporation Counsel of New York City.

== Sources ==
- The New York Civil List compiled by Franklin Benjamin Hough, Stephen C. Hutchins and Edgar Albert Werner (1867; page 531)
- Candidates of the Different Parties for the November Election in NYT on October 28, 1857
- PETER B. SWEENY DEAD AT 86 in NYT on September 1, 1911
- https://babel.hathitrust.org/cgi/pt?id=nnc2.ark:/13960/t78s7605p&seq=13 Gotham's Greater Rotten Row: Peter B. Sweeny's Project for a Splendid Public Pleasure Ground for Lovers of the Horse and the Horse Himself, 1890. Municipal Improvement Association New York.
- Judge Magazine, Vol 9 No. 229, March 6th 1886. "Peter B. Sweeny - 'By gosh! It's the same old place!". Political Cartoon by Judge Publishing Co., New York.
- Legal Considerations of the Act to the Legislature Relating to the Proposed Bridge Between the City of New York and the State of New Jersey, New York, Banks & Brothers, New York 1891.

Legal offices
Preceded by A. Oakey Hall	New York County District Attorney; 1858	Succeeded by Joseph Blunt
