= River Tweed, Leicestershire =

River in Leicestershire, England

Coordinates: 52.596°N 1.521°W

River Tweed
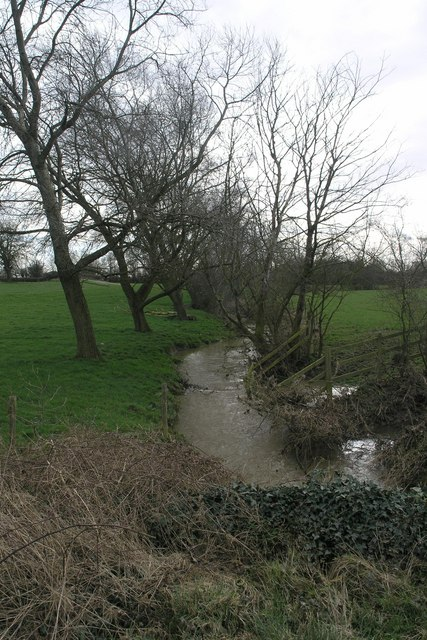
- The Tweed near Dadlington

Location
- Country: England

Physical characteristics
- Source
  - location: Barwell, Leicestershire, England
- Mouth
  - location: River Sence

The River Tweed is a short tributary of the River Sence. It rises around the west of the village of Barwell, Leicestershire, England, and flows westwards, crossing the A447 at Abraham's Bridge.

The Tweed is synonymous with many of the small rivers that rise in West Leicestershire. Starting from a number of small springs, it is not unknown for the river to flood, and as its source is in an urban area the flooding can hit a wide area.

The river meanders gently through the West Leicestershire flood plains, passing near the villages of Dadlington, Shenton and Sibson, and to Ratcliffe Culey where it flows into the River Sence which in turn flows into the Anker, itself a tributary of the Tame.

At the source of the Tweed, a raindrop could fall either side of a hill; on one side it would take a circuitous route via the Tweed, but on the other side it would flow via the River Soar to the Trent, although its eventual destination would be similar.
