= William M. Tweed =

American politician (1823–1878)

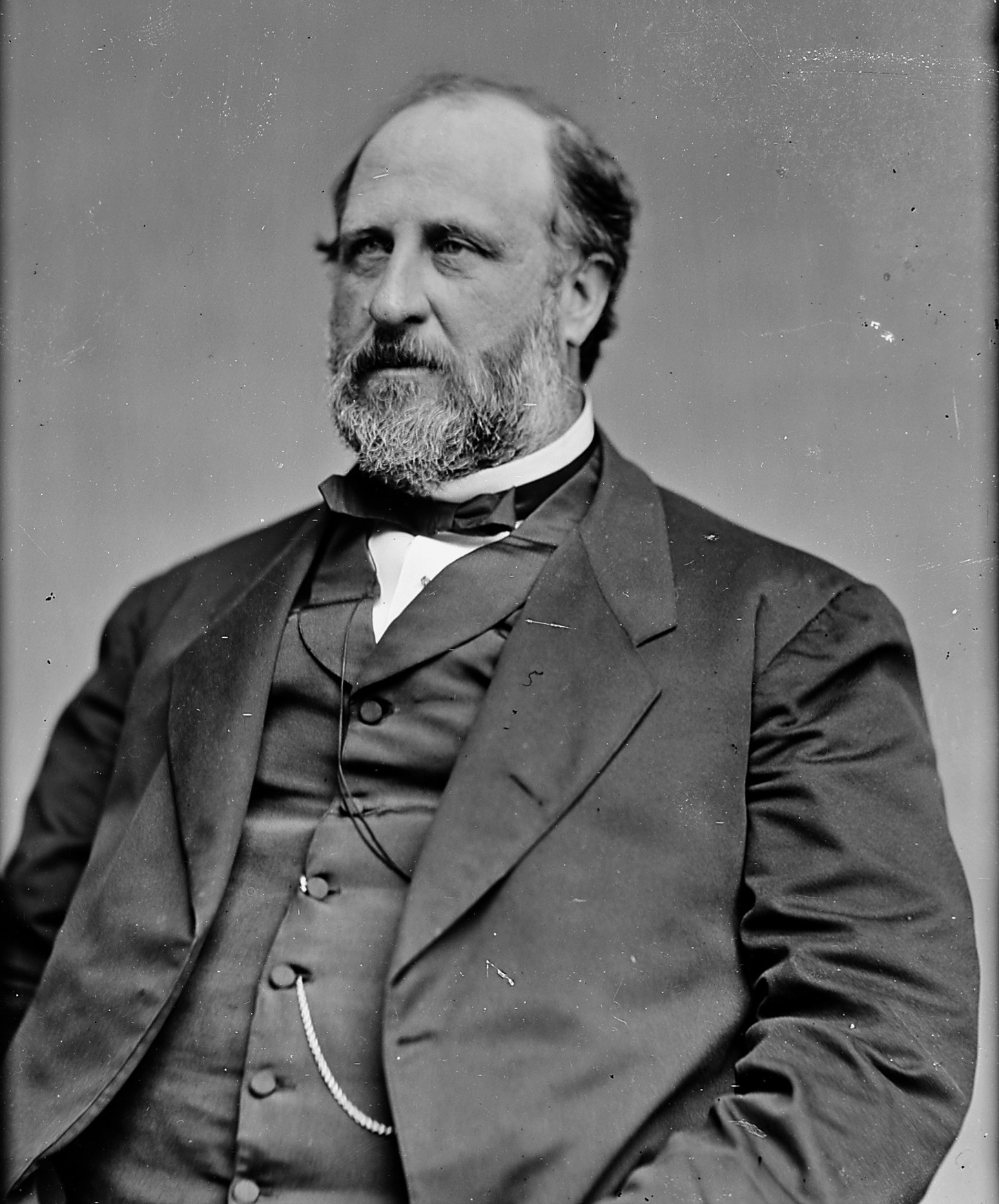
- Tweed in 1870

Member of the New York State Senate from the 4th district
- In office January 1, 1868 – December 31, 1873
- Preceded by: George Briggs
- Succeeded by: John Fox

Grand Sachem of Tammany Hall
- In office 1858–1871
- Preceded by: Fernando Wood
- Succeeded by: John Kelly and John Morrissey

Member of the U.S. House of Representatives from New York's 5th district
- In office March 4, 1853 – March 3, 1855
- Preceded by: George Briggs
- Succeeded by: Thomas R. Whitney

Personal details
- Born: William Magear Tweed; April 3, 1823 New York City, U.S.
- Died: April 12, 1878 (aged 55) New York City, U.S.
- Resting place: Green-Wood Cemetery
- Party: Democratic
- Spouse: Jane Skaden (m. 1844)
- Occupation: Bookkeeper; businessman; political boss
- Nickname: Boss Tweed

William Magear "Boss" Tweed (Note: Often erroneously referred to as William Marcy Tweed. Tweed never signed his middle name with anything other than a plain "M.". His actual middle name was Magear, his mother's maiden name. Confusion derived from a Nast cartoon with a picture of Tweed supplemented with a quote from William L. Marcy, the former governor of New York.) (April 3, 1823 – April 12, 1878) was an American politician most notable for being the political boss of Tammany Hall, the Democratic Party's political machine that played a major role in the politics of 19th-century New York City and State.

At the height of his influence, Tweed was the third-largest landowner in New York City, a director of the Erie Railroad, a director of the Tenth National Bank, a director of the New-York Printing Company, the proprietor of the Metropolitan Hotel, a significant stockholder in iron mines and gas companies, a board member of the Harlem Gas Light Company, a board member of the Third Avenue Railway Company, a board member of the Brooklyn Bridge Company, and the president of the Guardian Savings Bank.

Tweed was elected to the United States House of Representatives in 1852 and the New York County Board of Supervisors in 1858, the year that he became the head of the Tammany Hall political machine. He was also elected to the New York State Senate in 1867. However, Tweed's greatest influence came from being an appointed member of a number of boards and commissions, his control over political patronage in New York City through Tammany, and his ability to ensure the loyalty of voters through jobs he could create and dispense on city-related projects.

Boss Tweed was convicted for stealing an amount estimated by an aldermen's committee in 1877 at between $25 million and $45 million from New York City taxpayers by political corruption, but later estimates ranged as high as $200 million (equivalent to $6 billion in 2025). Unable to make bail, he escaped from jail once but was returned to custody. He died in the Ludlow Street Jail.

== Early life and education ==
Tweed was born April 3, 1823, at 1 Cherry Street, on the Lower East Side of Manhattan. The son of a third-generation Scottish chair-maker, Tweed grew up on Cherry Street. His grandfather arrived in the United States from a town near the River Tweed close to Edinburgh. Tweed's religious affiliation was not widely known in his lifetime, but at the time of his funeral The New York Times, quoting a family friend, reported that his parents had been Quakers and "members of the old Rose Street Meeting house". At the age of 11, he left school to learn his father's trade, and then became an apprentice to a saddler. He also studied to be a bookkeeper and worked as a brushmaker for a company he had invested in, before eventually joining in the family business in 1852. On September 29, 1844, he married Mary Jane C. Skaden and lived with her family on Madison Street for two years.

== Early career ==
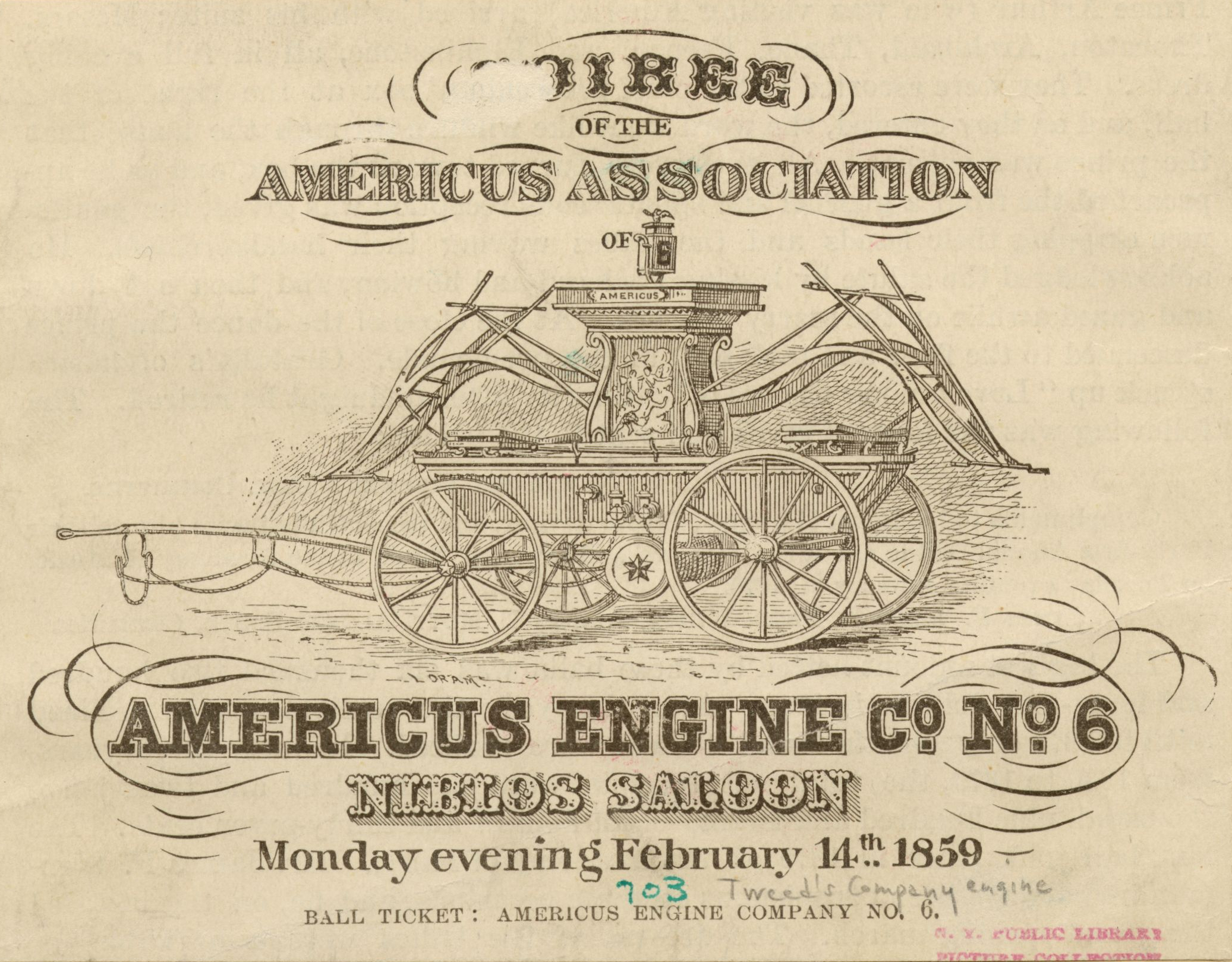
Ticket to an 1859 "soiree" to benefit Tweed's Americus Engine Co.

Tweed became a member of the Odd Fellows and the Masons, and joined a volunteer fire company, Engine No. 12. In 1848, at the invitation of state assemblyman John J. Reilly, he and some friends organized the Americus Fire Company No. 6, also known as the "Big Six", as a volunteer fire company, which took as its symbol a snarling red Bengal tiger from a French lithograph, a symbol which remained associated with Tweed and Tammany Hall for many years. At the time, volunteer fire companies competed vigorously with each other; some were connected with street gangs and had strong ethnic ties to various immigrant communities. The competition could become so fierce, that burning buildings would sometimes be ignored as the fire companies fought each other. Tweed became known for his ax-wielding violence, and was soon elected the Big Six foreman. Pressure from Alfred Carlson, the chief engineer, got him thrown out of the crew. However, fire companies were also recruiting grounds for political parties at the time, thus Tweed's exploits came to the attention of the Democratic politicians who ran the Seventh Ward. The Seventh Ward put him up for Alderman in 1850, when Tweed was 26. He lost that election to the Whig candidate Morgan Morgans, but ran again the next year and won, garnering his first political position. Tweed then became associated with the "Forty Thieves", the group of aldermen and assistant aldermen who, up to that point, were known as some of the most corrupt politicians in the city's history.

Tweed was elected to the United States House of Representatives in 1852, but his two-year term was undistinguished. In an attempt by Republican reformers in Albany, the state capital, to control the Democratic-dominated New York City government, the power of the New York County Board of Supervisors was beefed up. The board had 12 members, six appointed by the mayor and six elected, and in 1858 Tweed was appointed to the board, which became his first vehicle for large-scale graft; Tweed and other supervisors forced vendors to pay a 15% overcharge to their "ring" in order to do business with the city. By 1853, Tweed was running the seventh ward for Tammany. The board also had six Democrats and six Republicans, but Tweed often just bought off one Republican to sway the board. One such Republican board member was Peter P. Voorhis, a coal dealer by profession who absented himself from a board meeting in exchange for $2,500 so that the board could appoint city inspectors. Henry Smith was another Republican that was a part of the Tweed ring.

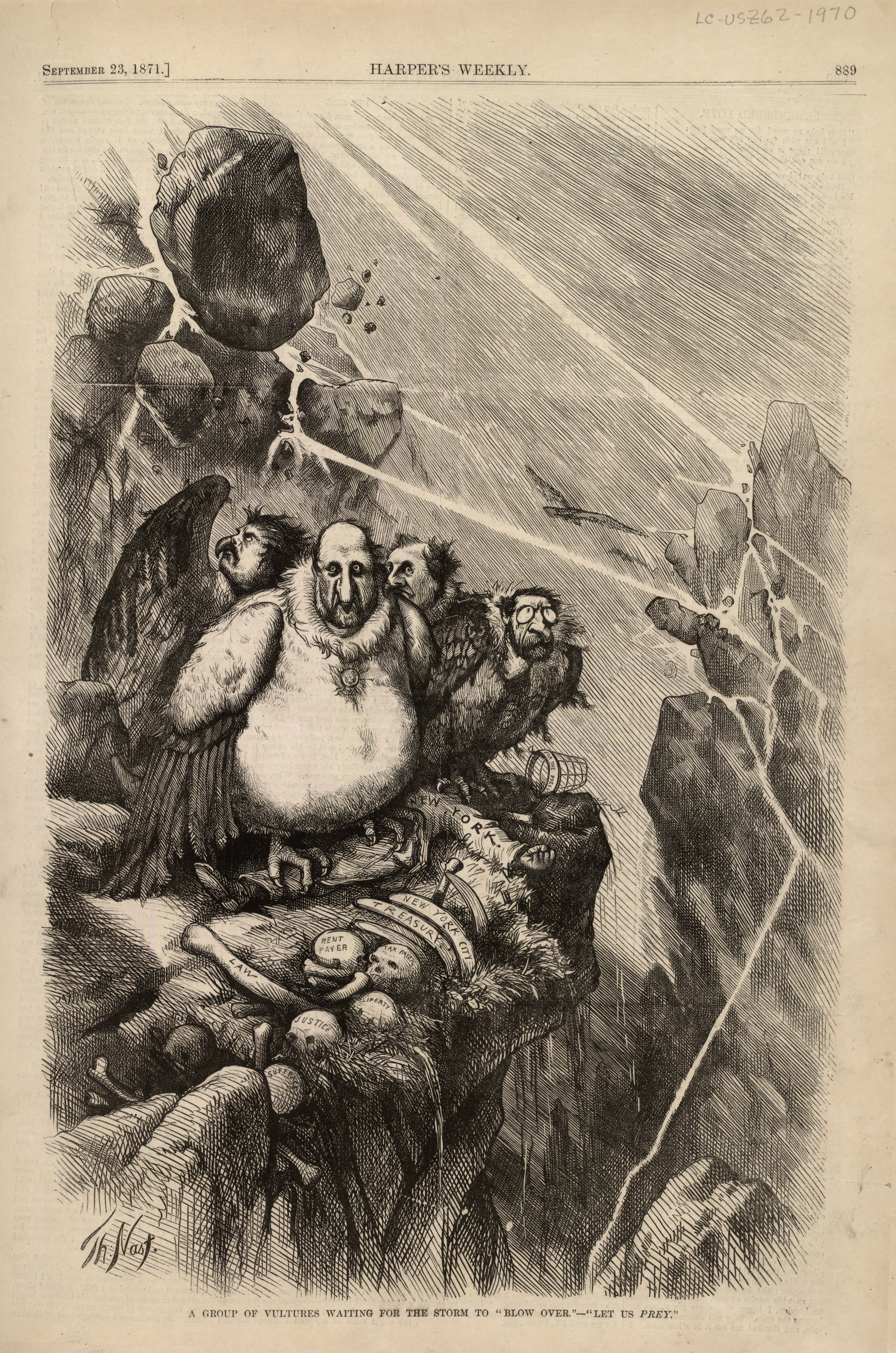
A Group of Vultures Waiting for the Storm to "Blow Over"—"Let Us Prey." by Thomas Nast, Harper's Weekly newspaper, September 23, 1871. "Boss" Tweed and members of his ring, Peter B. Sweeny, Richard B. Connolly, and A. Oakey Hall, weathering a violent storm on a ledge with the picked-over remains of New York City.

Although he was not trained as a lawyer, Tweed's friend, Judge George G. Barnard, certified him as an attorney, and Tweed opened a law office on Duane Street. He ran for sheriff in 1861 and was defeated, but became the chairman of the Democratic General Committee shortly after the election, and was then chosen to be the head of Tammany's general committee in January 1863. Several months later, in April, he became "Grand Sachem", and began to be referred to as "Boss", especially after he tightened his hold on power by creating a small executive committee to run the club. Tweed then took steps to increase his income: he used his law firm to extort money, which was then disguised as legal services; he had himself appointed deputy street commissioner – a position with considerable access to city contractors and funding; he bought the New-York Printing Company, which became the city's official printer, and the city's stationery supplier, the Manufacturing Stationers' Company, and had both companies begin to overcharge the city government for their goods and services. Among other legal services he provided, he accepted almost $100,000 from the Erie Railroad in return for favors. He also became one of the largest owners of real estate in the city. He also started to form what became known as the "Tweed Ring", by having his friends elected to office: George G. Barnard was elected Recorder of New York City; Peter B. Sweeny was elected New York County District Attorney; and Richard B. Connolly was elected City Comptroller. Other judicial members of the Tweed ring included Albert Cardozo, John McCunn, and John K. Hackett.

When Grand Sachem Isaac Fowler, who had produced the $2,500 to buy off the Republican Voorhis on the Board of Supervisors, was found to have stolen $150,000 in post office receipts, the responsibility for Fowler's arrest was given to Isaiah Rynders, another Tammany operative who was serving as a United States marshal at the time. Rynders made enough ruckus upon entering the hotel where Fowler was staying that Fowler was able to escape to Mexico.

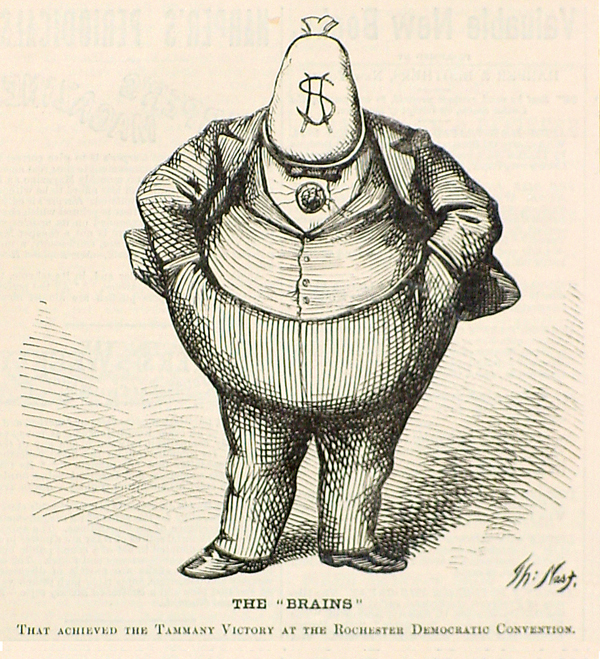
Thomas Nast depicts Tweed in Harper's Weekly (October 21, 1871).

With his new position and wealth came a change in style: Tweed began to favor wearing a large diamond in his shirtfront – a habit that Thomas Nast used to great effect in his attacks on Tweed in Harper's Weekly beginning in 1869 – and he bought a brownstone to live in at 41 West 36th Street, then a very fashionable area. He invested his now considerable illegal income in real estate, so that by the late 1860s he ranked among the biggest landowners in New York City.

Tweed became involved in the operation of the New York Mutuals, an early professional baseball club, in the 1860s. He brought in thousands of dollars per home game by dramatically increasing the cost of admission and gambling on the team. He has been credited with originating the practice of spring training in 1869 by sending the club south to New Orleans to prepare for the season.

Tweed was a member of the New York State Senate (4th D.) from 1868 to 1873, sitting in the 91st, 92nd, 93rd, and 94th New York State Legislatures, but not taking his seat in the 95th and 96th New York State Legislatures. While serving in the State Senate, he split his time between Albany, New York and New York City. While in Albany, he stayed in a suite of seven rooms in Delevan House. Accompanying him in his rooms were his favorite canaries. Guests are presumed to have included members of the Black Horse Cavalry, thirty state legislators whose votes were up for sale. In the Senate he helped financiers Jay Gould and Big Jim Fisk to take control of the Erie Railroad from Cornelius Vanderbilt by arranging for legislation that legitimized fake Erie stock certificates that Gould and Fisk had issued. In return, Tweed received a large block of stock and was made a director of the company. Tweed was also subsequently elected to the board of the Gould-controlled Cleveland and Pittsburgh Railroad (future Pennsylvania Railroad) in January 1870.

== Corruption ==
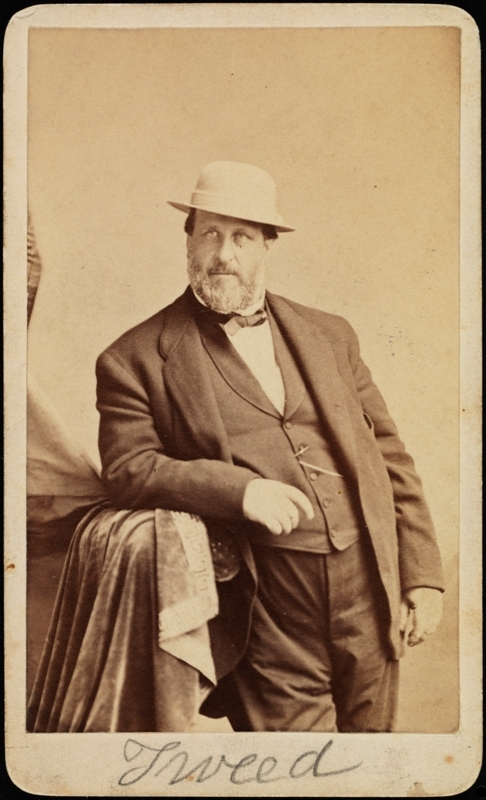
Tweed c. 1869

After the election of 1869, Tweed took control of the New York City government. His protégé, John T. Hoffman, the former mayor of the city, won election as governor, and Tweed garnered the support of good-government reformers like Peter Cooper and the Union League Club, by proposing a new city charter which returned power to City Hall at the expense of the Republican-inspired state commissions. The new charter passed, thanks in part to $600,000 in bribes Tweed paid to Republicans, and was signed into law by Hoffman in 1870. Mandated new elections allowed Tammany to take over the city's Common Council when they won all fifteen aldermanic contests.

The new charter put control of the city's finances in the hands of a Board of Audit, which consisted of Tweed, who was Commissioner of Public Works, Mayor A. Oakey Hall and Comptroller Richard "Slippery Dick" Connolly, both Tammany men. Hall also appointed other Tweed associates to high offices – such as Peter B. Sweeny, who took over the Department of Public Parks – providing what became known as the Tweed Ring with even firmer control of the New York City government and enabling them to defraud the taxpayers of many more millions of dollars. In the words of Albert Bigelow Paine, "their methods were curiously simple and primitive. There were no skilful manipulations of figures, making detection difficult ... Connolly, as Controller, had charge of the books, and declined to show them. With his fellows, he also 'controlled' the courts and most of the bar." Crucially, the new city charter allowed the Board of Audit to issue bonds for debt in order to finance opportunistic capital expenditures the city otherwise could not afford. This ability to float debt was enabled by Tweed's guidance and passage of the Adjusted Claims Act in 1868. Contractors working for the city – "Ring favorites, most of them – were told to multiply the amount of each bill by five, or ten, or a hundred, after which, with Mayor Hall's 'O. K.' and Connolly's endorsement, it was paid ... through a go-between, who cashed the check, settled the original bill and divided the remainder ... between Tweed, Sweeny, Connolly and Hall".

For example, the construction cost of the New York County Courthouse, begun in 1861, grew to nearly $13 million—about $370 million in 2025 dollars, and nearly twice the cost of the Alaska Purchase in 1867. "A carpenter was paid $360,751 (roughly $10.1 million in 2025) for one month's labor in a building with very little woodwork ... a plasterer got $133,187 ($3.7 million) for two days' work". Tweed bought a marble quarry in Sheffield, Massachusetts, to provide much of the marble for the courthouse at great profit to himself. After the Tweed Charter to reorganize the city's government was passed in 1870, four commissioners for the construction of the New York County Courthouse were appointed. The commission never held a meeting, though each commissioner received a 20% kickback from the bills for the supplies.

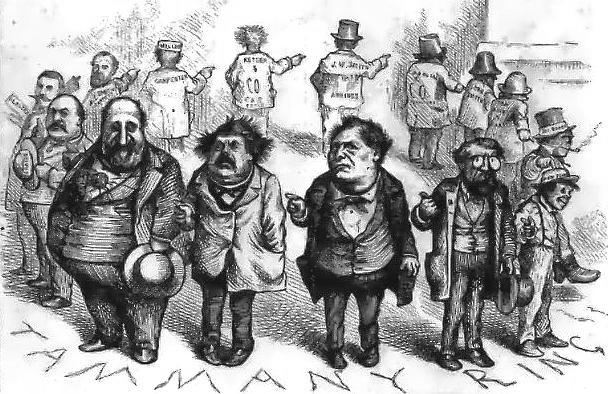
Nast depicts the Tweed Ring: "Who stole the people's money?" / "'Twas him." From left to right: William Tweed, Peter B. Sweeny, Richard B. Connolly, and Oakey Hall. To the left of Tweed in the background are James H. Ingersoll and Andrew Garvey, city contractors involved with much of the city construction.

Tweed and his friends also garnered huge profits from the development of the Upper East Side, especially Yorkville and Harlem. They would buy up undeveloped property, then use the resources of the city to improve the area – for instance by installing pipes to bring in water from the Croton Aqueduct – thus increasing the value of the land, after which they sold and took their profits. The focus on the east side also slowed down the development of the west side, the topography of which made it more expensive to improve. The ring also took their usual percentage of padded contracts, as well as raking off money from property taxes. Despite the corruption of Tweed and Tammany Hall, they did accomplish the development of upper Manhattan, though at the cost of tripling the city's bond debt to almost $90 million.

During the Tweed era, the proposal to build a suspension bridge between New York and Brooklyn, then an independent city, was floated by Brooklyn-boosters, who saw the ferry connections as a bottleneck to Brooklyn's further development. In order to ensure that the Brooklyn Bridge project would go forward, State Senator Henry Cruse Murphy approached Tweed to find out whether New York's aldermen would approve the proposal. Tweed's response was that $60,000 for the aldermen would close the deal, and contractor William C. Kingsley put up the cash, which was delivered in a carpet bag. Tweed and two others from Tammany also received over half the private stock of the Bridge Company, the charter of which specified that only private stockholders had voting rights, so that even though the cities of Brooklyn and Manhattan put up most of the money, they essentially had no control over the project.

Tweed bought a mansion at Fifth Avenue and 43rd Street, and stabled his horses, carriages and sleighs on 40th Street. By 1871, he was a member of the board of directors of not only the Erie Railroad and the Brooklyn Bridge Company, but also the Third Avenue Railway Company and the Harlem Gas Light Company. He was president of the Guardian Savings Banks and he and his confederates set up the Tenth National Bank to better control their fortunes.

== Scandal ==
Tweed's downfall began in 1871. James Watson, who was a county auditor in Comptroller Dick Connolly's office and who also held and recorded the ring's books, died a week after his head was smashed by a horse in a sleigh accident on January 24, 1871. Although Tweed guarded Watson's estate in the week prior to Watson's death, and although another ring member attempted to destroy Watson's records, a replacement auditor, Matthew O'Rourke, associated with former sheriff James O'Brien, provided city accounts to O'Brien. The Orange riot of 1871 in the summer of that year did not help the ring's popularity. The riot was prompted after Tammany Hall banned a parade of Irish Protestants celebrating a historical victory against Catholicism, namely the Battle of the Boyne. The parade was banned because of a riot the previous year in which eight people died when a crowd of Irish Catholic laborers attacked the paraders. Under strong pressure from the newspapers and the Protestant elite of the city, Tammany reversed course, and the march was allowed to proceed, with protection from city policemen and state militia. The result was an even larger riot in which over 60 people were killed and more than 150 injured.

Although Tammany's electoral power base was largely centered in the Irish immigrant population, it also needed both the city's general population and elite to acquiesce in its rule, and this was conditional on the machine's ability to control the actions of its people. The July riot showed that this capability was not nearly as strong as had been supposed.

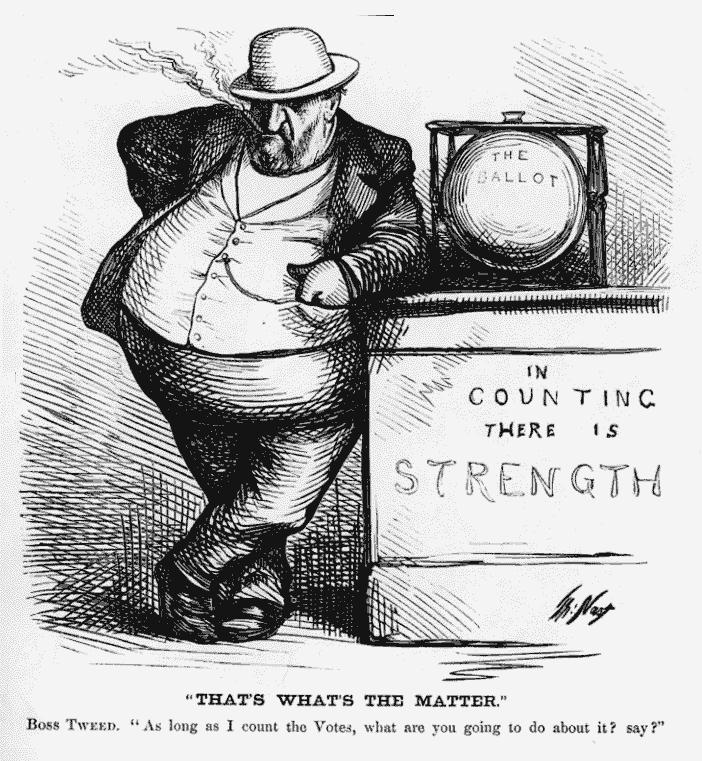
Nast shows Tweed's source of power: control of the ballot box. "As long as I count the Votes, what are you going to do about it?"

Tweed had for months been under attack from The New York Times and Thomas Nast, the cartoonist from Harper's Weekly – regarding Nast's cartoons, Tweed reportedly said, "Stop them damned pictures. I don't care so much what the papers say about me. My constituents don't know how to read, but they can't help seeing them damned pictures!" – but their campaign had only limited success in gaining traction. They were able to force an examination of the city's books, but the blue-ribbon commission of six businessmen appointed by Mayor A. Oakey Hall, a Tammany man, which included John Jacob Astor III, banker Moses Taylor and others who benefited from Tammany's actions, found that the books had been "faithfully kept", letting the air out of the effort to dethrone Tweed.

The response to the Orange riot changed everything, and only days afterwards the Times/Nast campaign began to garner popular support. More important, the Times started to receive inside information from County Sheriff James O'Brien, whose support for Tweed had fluctuated during Tammany's reign. O'Brien had tried to blackmail Tammany by threatening to expose the ring's embezzlement to the press, and when this failed he provided the evidence he had collected to the Times. Shortly afterward, county auditor Matthew J. O'Rourke supplied additional details to the Times, which was reportedly offered $5 million to not publish the evidence. The Times also obtained the accounts of the recently deceased James Watson, who was the Tweed Ring's bookkeeper, and these were published daily, culminating in a special four-page supplement on July 29 headlined "Gigantic Frauds of the Ring Exposed". In August, Tweed began to transfer ownership in his real-estate empire and other investments to his family members.

The exposé provoked an international crisis of confidence in New York City's finances, and, in particular, in its ability to repay its debts. European investors were heavily positioned in the city's bonds and were already nervous about its management – only the reputations of the underwriters were preventing a run on the city's securities. New York's financial and business community knew that if the city's credit were to collapse, it could potentially bring down every bank in the city with it.

Thus, the city's elite met at Cooper Union in September to discuss political reform: but for the first time, the conversation included not only the usual reformers, but also Democratic bigwigs such as Samuel J. Tilden, who had been thrust aside by Tammany. The consensus was that the "wisest and best citizens" should take over the governance of the city and attempt to restore investor confidence. The result was the formation of the executive committee of Citizens and Taxpayers for Financial Reform of the city (also known as "the Committee of Seventy"), which attacked Tammany by cutting off the city's funding. Property owners refused to pay their municipal taxes, and a judge—Tweed's old friend George Barnard—enjoined the city Comptroller from issuing bonds or spending money. Unpaid workers turned against Tweed, marching to City Hall demanding to be paid. Tweed doled out some funds from his own purse—$50,000—but it was not sufficient to end the crisis, and Tammany began to lose its essential base.

Shortly thereafter, the Comptroller resigned, appointing Andrew Haswell Green, an associate of Tilden, as his replacement. Green loosened the purse strings again, allowing city departments not under Tammany control to borrow money to operate. Green and Tilden had the city's records closely examined, and discovered money that went directly from city contractors into Tweed's pocket. The following day (27 October 1871), they had Tweed arrested.

== Imprisonment, escape, and death ==
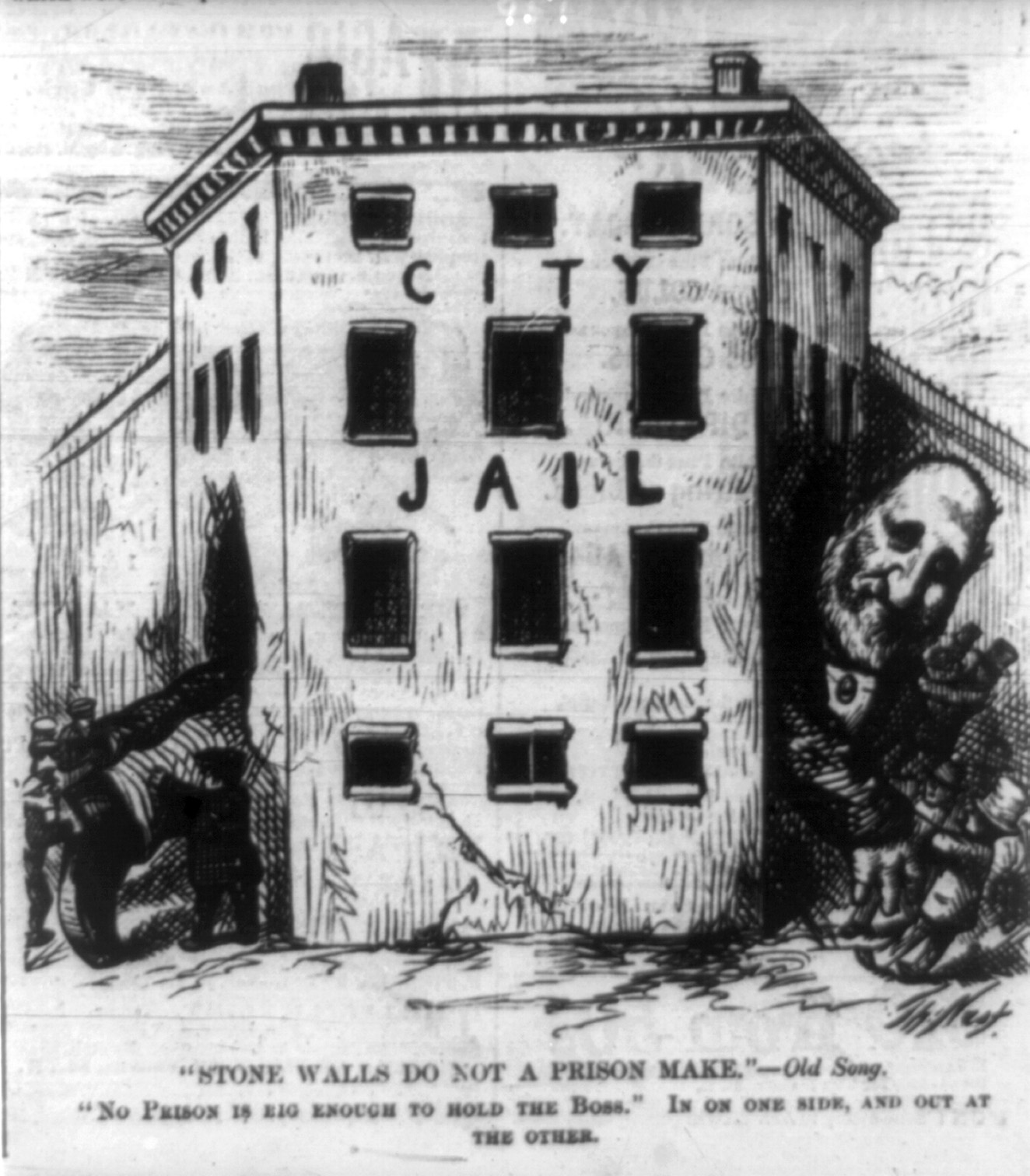
"Stone Walls Do Not a Prison Make": Editorial cartoon by Thomas Nast predicting Tweed could not be kept behind bars (Harper's Weekly, January 6, 1872)

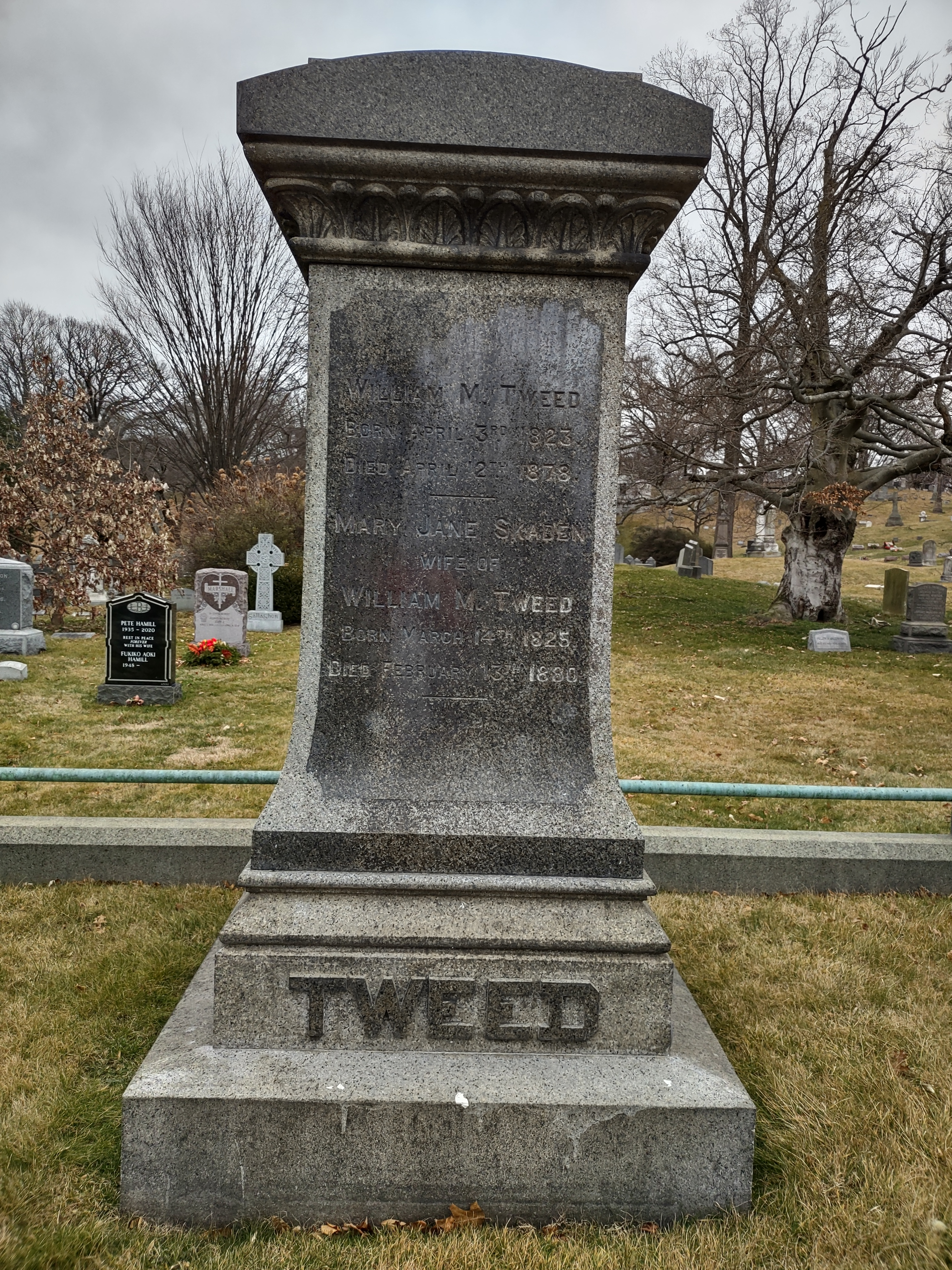
Tomb in Green-Wood Cemetery

Tweed was released on $1 million bail, and Tammany set to work to recover its position through the ballot box. Tweed was re-elected to the state senate in November 1871, due to his personal popularity and largesse in his district, but in general Tammany did not do well, and the members of the Tweed Ring began to flee the jurisdiction, many going overseas. Tweed was re-arrested, forced to resign his city positions, and was replaced as Tammany's leader. Once again, he was released on bail—$8 million this time—but Tweed's supporters, such as Jay Gould, felt the repercussions of his fall from power.

Tweed's first trial before Judge Noah Davis, in January 1873, ended when the jury was unable to deliver a verdict. Tweed's defense counsel included David Dudley Field II and Elihu Root. His retrial, again before Judge Noah Davis in November resulted in convictions on 204 of 220 counts, a fine of $12,750 (equivalent to $342,656 in 2025), and a prison sentence of 12 years; a higher court, however, reduced Tweed's sentence to one year. After his release from The Tombs prison, New York State filed a civil suit against Tweed, attempting to recover $6 million in embezzled funds. Unable to put up the $3 million bail, Tweed was locked up in the Ludlow Street Jail, although he was allowed home visits. During one of these on December 4, 1875, Tweed escaped and fled via Cuba to Spain, where he worked as a common seaman on a Spanish ship. The U.S. government discovered his whereabouts and arranged for his arrest once he reached the Spanish border, where he was recognized from Nast's political cartoons. He was turned over to an American warship, the USS Franklin, which delivered him to authorities in New York City on November 23, 1876, and he was returned to prison.

Desperate and broken, Tweed now agreed to testify about the inner workings of the Tweed Ring to a special committee set up by the Board of Aldermen in return for his release. However, after he did so, Tilden, now governor of New York, refused to abide by the agreement, and Tweed remained incarcerated.

=== Death and burial ===
He died in the Ludlow Street Jail on April 12, 1878, from severe pneumonia, and was buried in Brooklyn's Green-Wood Cemetery. Mayor Smith Ely Jr. would not allow the flag at City Hall to be flown at half staff.

== Evaluations ==
According to Tweed biographer Kenneth D. Ackerman:

It's hard not to admire the skill behind Tweed's system ... The Tweed ring at its height was an engineering marvel, strong and solid, strategically deployed to control key power points: the courts, the legislature, the treasury and the ballot box. Its frauds had a grandeur of scale and an elegance of structure: money-laundering, profit sharing and organization.

A minority view that Tweed was mostly innocent is presented in a scholarly biography by history professor Leo Hershkowitz. He states:

Except for Tweed's own very questionable "confession," there really was no evidence of a "Tweed Ring," no direct evidence of Tweed's thievery, no evidence, excepting the testimony of the informer contractors, of "wholesale" plunder by Tweed....[Instead there was] a conspiracy of self-justification of the corruption of the law by the upholders of that law, of a venal irresponsible press and a citizenry delighting in the exorcism of witchery.

In depictions of Tweed and the Tammany Hall organization, most historians have emphasized the thievery and conspiratorial nature of Boss Tweed, along with lining his own pockets and those of his friends and allies. The theme is that the sins of corruption so violated American standards of political rectitude that they far overshadow Tweed's positive contributions to New York City.

Although he held numerous important public offices and was one of a handful of senior leaders of Tammany Hall, as well as the state legislature and the state Democratic Party, Tweed was never the sole "boss" of New York City. He shared control of the city with numerous less famous people, such as the villains depicted in Nast's famous circle of guilt cartoon shown above. Seymour J. Mandelbaum has argued that, apart from the corruption he engaged in, Tweed was a modernizer who prefigured certain elements of the Progressive Era in terms of more efficient city management. Much of the money he siphoned off from the city treasury went to needy constituents who appreciated the free food at Christmas time and remembered it at the next election, and to precinct workers who provided the muscle of his machine. As a legislator he worked to expand and strengthen welfare programs, especially those by private charities, schools, and hospitals. With a base in the Irish Catholic community, he opposed efforts of Protestants to require the reading of the King James Bible in public schools, which was done deliberately to keep out Catholics. He facilitated the founding of the New York Public Library, even though one of its founders, Samuel Tilden, was Tweed's sworn enemy in the Democratic Party.

Tweed recognized that the support of his constituency was necessary for him to remain in power, and as a consequence he used the machinery of the city's government to provide numerous social services, including building more orphanages, almshouses and public baths. Tweed also fought for the New York State Legislature to donate to private charities of all religious denominations, and subsidize Catholic schools and hospitals. From 1869 to 1871, under Tweed's influence, the state of New York spent more on charities than for the entire time period from 1852 to 1868 combined.

During Tweed's regime, the main business thoroughfare Broadway was widened between 34th Street and 59th Street, land was secured for the Metropolitan Museum of Art, and the Upper East Side and Upper West Side were developed and provided the necessary infrastructure – all to the benefit of the purses of the Tweed Ring.

Hershkowitz blames the implications of Thomas Nast in Harper's Weekly and the editors of The New York Times, which both had ties to the Republican party. In part, the campaign against Tweed diverted public attention from Republican scandals such as the Whiskey Ring.

Tweed himself wanted no particular recognition of his achievements, such as they were. When it was proposed, in March 1871, when he was at the height of his power, that a statue be erected in his honor, he declared: "Statues are not erected to living men ... I claim to be a live man, and hope (Divine Providence permitting) to survive in all my vigor, politically and physically, some years to come." One of Tweed's unwanted legacies is that he has become "the archetype of the bloated, rapacious, corrupt city boss".

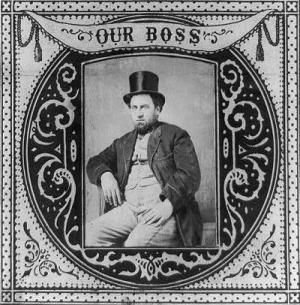
An 1869 cigar box label featuring Tweed

== In popular culture ==
- In 1945, Tweed was portrayed by Noah Beery Sr. in the Broadway production of Up in Central Park, a musical comedy with music by Sigmund Romberg. The role was played by Malcolm Lee Beggs for a revival in 1947. In the 1948 film version, Tweed is played by Vincent Price.
- On the 1963–1964 CBS TV series The Great Adventure, which presented one-hour dramatizations of the lives of historical figures, Edward Andrews portrayed Tweed in the episode "The Man Who Stole New York City", about the campaign by The New York Times to bring down Tweed. The episode aired on December 13, 1963.
- In John Varley's 1977 science-fiction novel, The Ophiuchi Hotline, a crooked politician in a 27th-century human settlement on the Moon assumes the name "Boss Tweed" in emulation of the 19th-century politician, and names his lunar headquarters "Tammany Hall".
- Tweed was played by Philip Bosco in the 1986 TV movie Liberty. According to a review of the film in The New York Times, it was Tweed who made the suggestion to call the Statue of Liberty by that name, instead of its formal name Liberty Enlightening the World, in order to read better in newspaper headlines.
- Andrew O'Hehir of The New York Times notes that Forever, a 2003 novel by Pete Hamill, and Gangs of New York, a 2002 film, both "offer a significant supporting role to the legendary Manhattan political godfather Boss Tweed", among other thematic similarities. In a review of the latter work, Chuck Rudolph praised Jim Broadbent's portrayal of Tweed as "giving the role a masterfully heartless composure".

== See also ==
- Elbert A. Woodward
- Timothy "Big Tim" Sullivan
- Tweed law
- William J. Sharkey (murderer)

U.S. House of Representatives
Preceded by George Briggs	Member of the U.S. House of Representatives from New York's 5th congressional district 1853–1855	Succeeded by Thomas R. Whitney
New York State Senate
Preceded by Benjamin Wood	New York State Senate; 4th District; 1868–1873	Succeeded by John Fox
Party political offices
Preceded by Fernando Wood	Head of Tammany Hall; 1858–1871	Succeeded by John Kelly
