= Tokuko =

- Gender: Female

Origin
- Origin: Japanese
- Meaning: Different meanings depending on the kanji used

Tokuko (written: 徳子) is a feminine Japanese given name. Notable people with the name include:

- Tokuko Kubo (久保 徳子; born 1952), Japanese handball player
- Tokuko Moriwaki, Japanese-American tennis player
- Tokuko Takagi (高木 徳子; 1891–1919), Japanese dancer and actress
- Taira no Tokuko (平 徳子; 1155–1213), Japanese empress
- Tokuko Ushioda (潮田 登久子; born 1940), Japanese photographer
