= James Hackett =

James Hackett may refer to:

- James Hackett (businessman) (born 1955), CEO of Ford Motor Company
- James K. Hackett (1869–1926), American actor
- James Hackett (shipbuilder) (1739–1802), American master shipbuilder
- James William Hackett (1929–2015), American haiku poet
- James Henry Hackett (1800–1871), American actor
- James Hackett, American former CEO of Anadarko Petroleum
- Jim Hackett (1877–1961) "Sunny Jim", American baseball player
- Jim Hackett (cricketer) (1917–2004), from Queensland, Australia
