= Francis McAvoy =

Francis McAvoy may refer to:

- Frank McAvoy (1875–?), Scottish footballer
- Francis S. McAvoy (c. 1850–1926), American lawyer and politician from New York
