= Albert W. Hale =

American film director

The No Account Count (1914)

Albert W. Hale (January 1, 1882 – February 27, 1947) was a French-born American early film director and producer. He directed some 35 films from 1912 until 1915. He worked for Majestic Film Company studio, and the National Film Corporation.

== Background ==
Hale was born in Bordeaux, France on January 1, 1882.

He married Julia F. Johnson.

== Filmography ==
- The Birth of the Lotus Blossom (1912)
- For the Mikado (1912)
- Miss Taqu of Tokio, also called Miss Tagu of Tokio for the British release, (1912) with Tokuko Takagi, a Thanhouser film
- Letters of a Lifetime (1912)
- The Light of St. Bernard (1912)
- Three Girls and a Man (1912)
- Roland's Escapades
- Days of Terror (1912)
- Three Girls and a Man (1912)
- She Cried (film) (1912)
- The Irony of Fate (film) (1912)
- A Fortune in a Teacup
- A Persistent Lover (1912)
- Her Old Sweetheart (1912)
- Roland's Lucky Day
- Buried Alive in a Coal Mine (1913)
- An Accidental Clue (1913)
- The Iceman's Revenge (1913)
- A Tide in the Affairs of Men (1913)
- The Mystery of Tusa (1913) starring J. Warren Kerrigan
- Tom Blake's Redemption (1913)
- At the Half-Breed's Mercy (1913)
- Quicksands (1913), starring J. Warren Kerrigan
- Calamity Anne Takes a Trip (1913)
- A Husband's Mistake (1913)
- Reward of Courage (1913)
- Buried Alive in a Coal Mine (1913)
- The No Account Count (1914), Kalem
- Tough Luck Smith (1914)
- Fatty and the Shyster Lawyer (1914)
- The Widow's Might (1914)
- A Wise Rube (1914)
- Tough Luck Smith (1914)
- Percy Pimpernickel, Soubrette (1914), a Kalem film
- For the Love of Mike (1914)
- Jones' Wedding Day (1914)
- Easy Money (1914) from a story by Frank Howard Clark
- The Winking Zulu (1914)
- Was She a Vampire? (1915)

=== Producer ===
- The Prisoner of Zenda (1913)
