= James K. Hackett =

American actor (1869–1926)

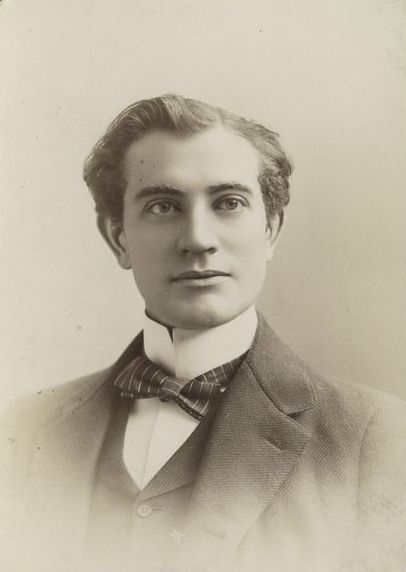
- Born: September 6, 1869; Wolfe Island, Ontario, Canada
- Died: November 8, 1926 (aged 57); Paris, France
- Resting place: Woodlawn Cemetery in New York
- Education: City College of New York (BA)
- Occupation: Stage actor
- Spouses: Mary Mannering (m. 1897; div. 1908) Beatrice Mary Beckley (m. 1911)
- Children: 1
- Parent: James Henry Hackett

James Keteltas Hackett (September 6, 1869 – November 8, 1926) was an American actor and manager.

== Life ==
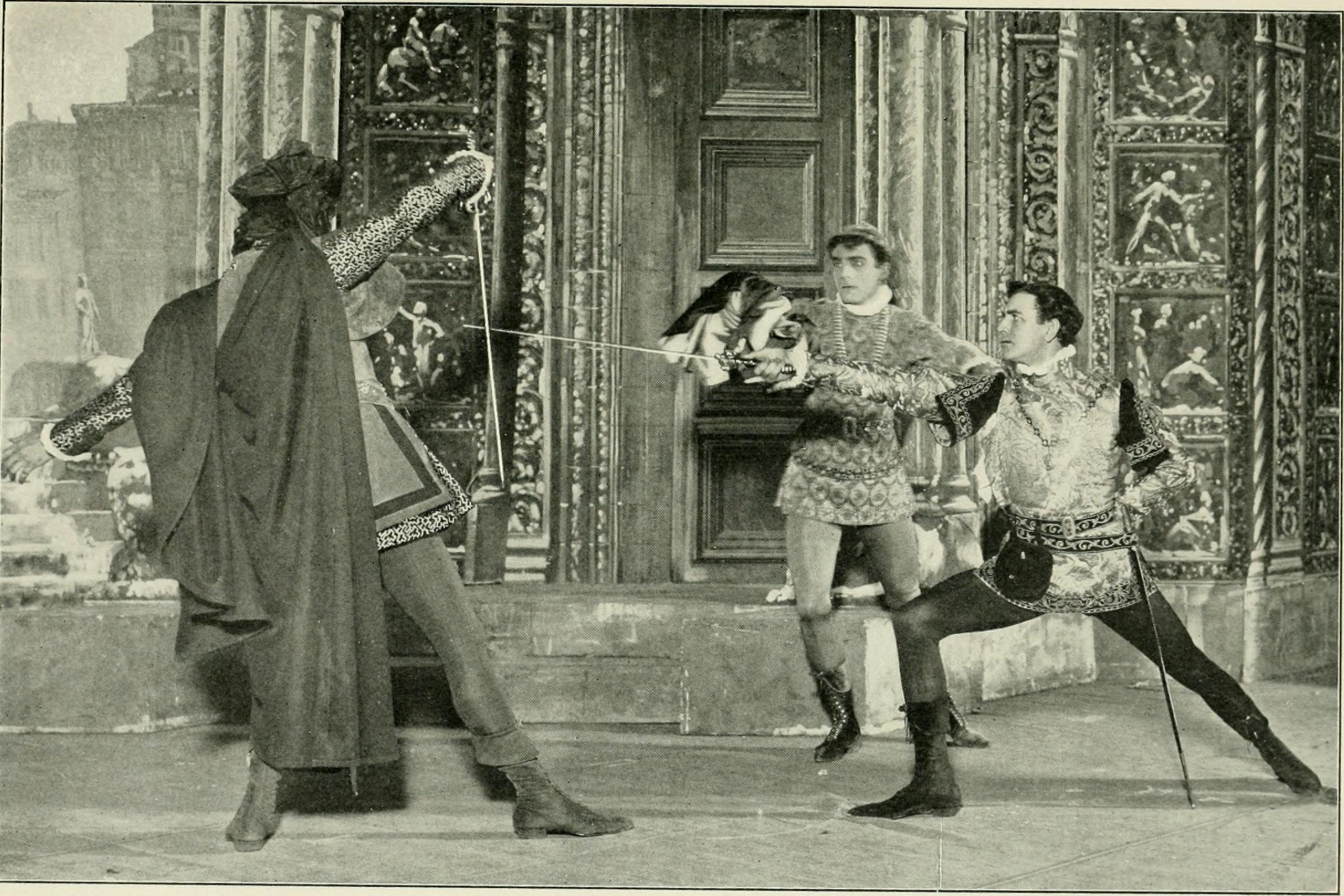
James K. Hackett (right) as Mercutio in the Broadway revival of Romeo and Juliet (1899)

Hackett was the son of Clara C. and James Henry Hackett, a comedian and celebrated Falstaff. He was born on Wolfe Island, Ontario, Canada. His elderly father died at age 71 when Hackett was just two years old.

Hackett attended New York's Grammar School 69 and graduated with a B.A. degree from the College of the City of New York in 1891. He made his professional debut as an actor in Philadelphia in 1892, as Francois in The Broken Seal. In New York later that year, he played opposite Mrs. Potter. Later in the decade, he played Romeo to Olga Nethersole's Juliet, and Mercutio to Maude Adams's Juliet.

After a year on tour, Hackett opened in a theatrical adaptation of Rupert of Hentzau at the Lyceum Theatre in New York City on April 10, 1899, playing King Rudolf and his lookalike Rudolf Rassendyll.

Hackett played Captain Basil Jennico in the 1900 production of The Pride of Jennico with Bertha Galland in her New York stage debut.

In 1913, Adolph Zukor lured Hackett from the stage to star in director Edwin Porter's film The Prisoner of Zenda (1913), for a role which Hackett had played in the theater numerous times. Since feature films were in their infancy, Hackett was at first reluctant to take the part. Zukor tried to convince Hackett in person, and as Neal Gabler writes, "When Hackett came to visit Zukor, he was the very picture of the faded matinee idol. He wore a fur-collared coat with frayed sleeves and carried a gold-headed cane".

On May 2, 1897, he married the actress Mary Mannering, and they had a daughter together. They divorced in 1908. In 1911, Hackett remarried to Beatrice Mary Beckley, who appeared with him in his debut film The Prisoner of Zenda for Zukor's Famous Players company.

Recorder John K. Hackett was his half-brother. In 1914, Hackett inherited from his niece Minnie (Hackett) Trowbridge, the only child of his half-brother, the larger part of her estate, valued at $1,389,049, equivalent to $44,648,004 in 2025.

In 1915, a large farm property in Clayton, New York was acquired by Hackett. He named the property after his favorite role, the title character in the 1913 film, The Prisoner of Zenda. Since 1997, the property, now called Zenda Farms Preserve, has been conserved and stewarded by the Thousand Islands Land Trust, an accredited environmental conservation non profit.

Hackett died at his home in Paris on November 8, 1926. He was cremated in Paris, and his ashes taken for interment in the family vault at the Woodlawn Cemetery in New York.

== Publications ==
- Strang, Famous Actors of the Day in America, (Boston, 1900)
- William Winter, The Wallet of Time, (two volumes, New York, 1913)
