= Moriwaki (surname) =

Moriwaki (written: 森脇) is a Japanese surname. Notable people with the surname include:

- Eiichi Moriwaki (森脇 英一), Japanese photographer
- Hiroshi Moriwaki (森脇 浩司; born 1960), Japanese baseball player
- Kenji Moriwaki (森脇 健児; born 1967), Japanese comedian and radio personality
- Makoto Moriwaki (森脇 真琴), Japanese anime director
- Mamoru Moriwaki, Japanese motorcycle designer and tuner
- Ryota Moriwaki (森脇 良太; born 1986), Japanese footballer
- Shogo Moriwaki (森脇 尚護), Japanese motorcycle racer
- Tokuko Moriwaki, Japanese-American tennis player
- Yasuhiko Moriwaki (森脇 保彦; born 1952), Japanese judoka
- Yoko Moriwaki (森脇 瑤子; 1932–1945), Japanese diarist
- Yoshite Moriwaki (森脇 由晃; born 1954), Japanese sport wrestler
