= James M. Smith =

American lawyer and politician (c. 1810–1898)

James M. Smith Jr.

Recorder of New York City
- In office January 1, 1855 – December 31, 1857
- Preceded by: Francis R. Tillou
- Succeeded by: George G. Barnard

Personal details
- Born: c. 1810 New Baltimore, New York
- Died: June 5, 1898 (aged 87–88) Manhattan, New York
- Party: Democratic

James M. Smith Jr. (c. 1810 – June 5, 1898) was an American lawyer and politician from New York.

== Background ==
Smith was born in New Baltimore, New York circa 1810.

In November 1854, he was elected on the Democratic ticket (a fusion of Hards and Softs) as Recorder of New York City, defeating the incumbent Francis R. Tillou. Upon the creation of the Metropolitan Police in 1857, Recorder Smith became one of the commissioners of the Police Board, along with Mayor Fernando Wood and City Judge Sydney H. Stuart. When Mayor Wood resisted the new police force, maintaining the abolished Municipal Police instead, Smith issued a warrant for the arrest of the mayor, which led to the New York City Police Riot. In October 1857, Smith was defeated for re-nomination on the Tammany ticket by George G. Barnard.

Later Smith left Tammany Hall, and joined the Anti-Tammany Democratic organizations in New York City, like Mozart Hall and Irving Hall. In 1872, Smith was nominated for New York County District Attorney on the "National Democratic" ticket.

== Personal life ==
Smith married Emily F. Sherman, and they had eleven children. Their son Frank Sherman Smith was appointed police justice at age 24, becoming the youngest judge in New York City at the time. In the summer of 1896, his wife died in a horse-carriage accident. Smith then retired from the bar, sold his home and moved into a boarding house. Smith died from "rheumatic gout" in Manhattan on June 5, 1898. He was buried in the Sherman family plot in New Baltimore, New York.

Legal offices
Preceded by Francis R. Tillou	Recorder of New York City; 1855–1857	Succeeded by George G. Barnard
