= John B. Scott (New York politician) =

American politician

John B. Scott (ca. 1789 – September 18, 1854 East Hampton, Suffolk County, New York) was an American lawyer and politician from New York.

== Life ==
He was for more than twenty years a justice of the New York City Marine Court. In May 1840, Scott and Effingham Schieffelin were removed from office on the allegation that the Court had supplied foreigners with letters of naturalization before their legal term of probation (5 years) had expired. After the removal, Scott published An Appeal to the People, from the Decision of the Senate, in the Case of the Removal of the Justices of the Marine Court (New York City, 1840; 30 pages). Half a year later, Scott was elected to the State Senate.

Scott was a Democratic member of the New York State Senate (1st D.) from 1841 to 1844, sitting in the 64th, 65th, 66th and 67th New York State Legislatures.

In 1846, he was appointed by Gov. Silas Wright as Recorder of New York City, the last holder of this office appointed by the governor and confirmed by the State Senate, remaining in office until the end of 1848. On January 1, 1849, he was succeeded by Frederick A. Tallmadge, the first Recorder elected by popular ballot.

== Death ==
Scott lived at 11 Albion Place in New York City, but died in East Hampton, Long Island, returning from his summer vacation. His remains were deposited in the receiving vault of the 2nd Street Protestant Episcopal Cemetery and later transferred to the Trinity Church Cemetery and Mausoleum.

== Sources ==
- The New York Civil List compiled by Franklin Benjamin Hough (pages 133f and 428; Weed, Parsons and Co., 1858)
- Death of Ex-Recorder Scott in NYT on September 21, 1854
- Funeral of Ex-Recorder Scott in NYT on September 21, 1854

New York State Senate
Preceded by Frederick A. Tallmadge	New York State Senate; First District (Class 2); 1841–1844	Succeeded by George Folsom
Legal offices
Preceded by Frederick A. Tallmadge	Recorder of New York City; 1846–1848	Succeeded by Frederick A. Tallmadge
