= Francis R. Tillou =

American lawyer and politician

Francis Redding Tillou

Recorder of New York City
- In office 1852–1854
- Preceded by: James M. Smith, Jr.
- Succeeded by: Frederick A. Tallmadge

Personal details
- Born: c. 1795
- Died: July 10, 1865 (aged 69–70) Edgewater, New Jersey, US
- Party: Democratic
- Spouse: Caroline M. Drake (after 1822)
- Relatives: Joseph Rodman Drake (brother-in-law); Francis Redding Tillou Nicholls (nephew)
- Occupation: Philanthropist, Children's Village co-founder

Francis Redding Tillou (c. 1795 – July 10, 1865) was an American lawyer and politician from New York, and co-founder of the Children's Village.

== Early life ==
Tillou was born c. 1795. His family was said to have been descended from Pierre Tillou, a Huguenot who fled Saint-Nazaire, France in 1681.

== Career ==
In August 1835, the Federal Land Office at Green Bay put up for sale the area which would become Madison, Wisconsin, and on October 7, 1835, Tillou bought the first 100 acres.

Tillou lived at a country estate which he named "Tillietudlem", in a place then known as Pleasant Valley in Hackensack Township, Bergen County, New Jersey. The house stood where now the Edgewater Public Library is located, at the corner of Undercliff and Hudson Ave. in Edgewater, New Jersey.

On March 1, 1849, Tillou was granted the right to run a ferry-boat service from his estate's landing on the Hudson River to New York City. The landing was located approximately at the place of the present-day Edgewater Marina and Ferry Stop. He ran a law practice with Francis B. Cutting (1804–1870), known as Tillou & Cutting.

=== Public service ===
In November 1851, Tillou was elected on the Democratic ticket Recorder of New York City, and remained in office from 1852 until the end of 1854, serving under Mayors, Ambrose C. Kingsland and Jacob A. Westervelt. In November 1854, Tillou was nominated on the Municipal Reform and the Temperance tickets for re-election, but was defeated by James M. Smith, Jr. who had been nominated jointly by Hard and Soft Democrats, while most other offices were won by the Whigs, defeating the split Democrats.

In November 1861, Tillou ran on the Union ticket (a fusion of Republicans and War Democrats) for the New York State Senate (4th D.) but was defeated by Democrat Christian B. Woodruff.

== Personal life ==
On February 15, 1822, he married Caroline M. "Cara" Drake (c. 1793). His wife was a sister of Joseph Rodman Drake (1795-1820), the poet, and Louisa Hannah Drake (a sister of Caroline and Joseph Rodman Drake), who was married to Thomas Clark Nicholls. Louis and Thomas were the parents of Francis Redding Tillou Nicholls, the Governor of Louisiana who was named after his uncle-by-marriage. Fitz-Greene Halleck, an usher at their wedding, wrote "A Valentine" for her on the eve of their wedding, which was later printed in 1872. Together, they were the parents of:

- Charles Graham Tillou (1825–1891), who married Sarah Condit (1824–1894), daughter of Stephen Condit (1791–1835).
- Edward Tillou (d. 1915)
- Julia Tillou (1837–1910), who married Gouverneur Kemble, Jr. (1835–1898), a nephew of Gouverneur Kemble (1786–1875), on January 11, 1860.
- Alice Tillou (1840–1905), who married Oscar Smedberg (1837–1877) on June 12, 1860.
- Francis R. Tillou, Jr.

In 1846, he was purported to be worth $150,000.

Tillou died of paralysis on July 10, 1865, at his home "Tillietudlem" in New Jersery. After a funeral at St. John's Church, he was buried at Green-Wood Cemetery.

Legal offices
Preceded by Frederick A. Tallmadge	Recorder of New York City; 1852–1854	Succeeded by James M. Smith, Jr.
