= Should a Husband Forgive? =

1919 film by Raoul Walsh

- Directed by: Raoul Walsh
- Screenplay by: Raoul Walsh
- Starring: Miriam Cooper; Beatrice Beckley; Eric Mayne; Vincent Coleman; Lyster Chambers; Percy Standing
- Cinematography: Devereaux Jennings
- Production company: Fox Film Corporation
- Distributed by: Fox Film Corporation
- Release date: November 1, 1919
- Running time: 60 minutes
- Country: United States
- Language: English

Should a Husband Forgive? is a 1919 American drama film written and directed by Raoul Walsh. The film stars Miriam Cooper, Beatrice Beckley, Eric Mayne, Vincent Coleman, Lyster Chambers and Percy Standing. The film was released on November 1, 1919, by Fox Film Corporation.

== Cast ==
- Miriam Cooper as Ruth Fulton
- Beatrice Beckley as Mary Carroll
- Eric Mayne as John Carroll
- Vincent Coleman as John Carroll Jr.
- Lyster Chambers as Rogue
- Percy Standing as Rex Burleigh
- Charles Craig as A Human Jackal
- Martha Mansfield as The Girl Who Was Cast Aside
- James Marcus as Uncle Jim
- Johnny Ries as Kid Dugan
- Tom Burke as Josephus McCarthy
