= George G. Barnard =

American lawyer and politician

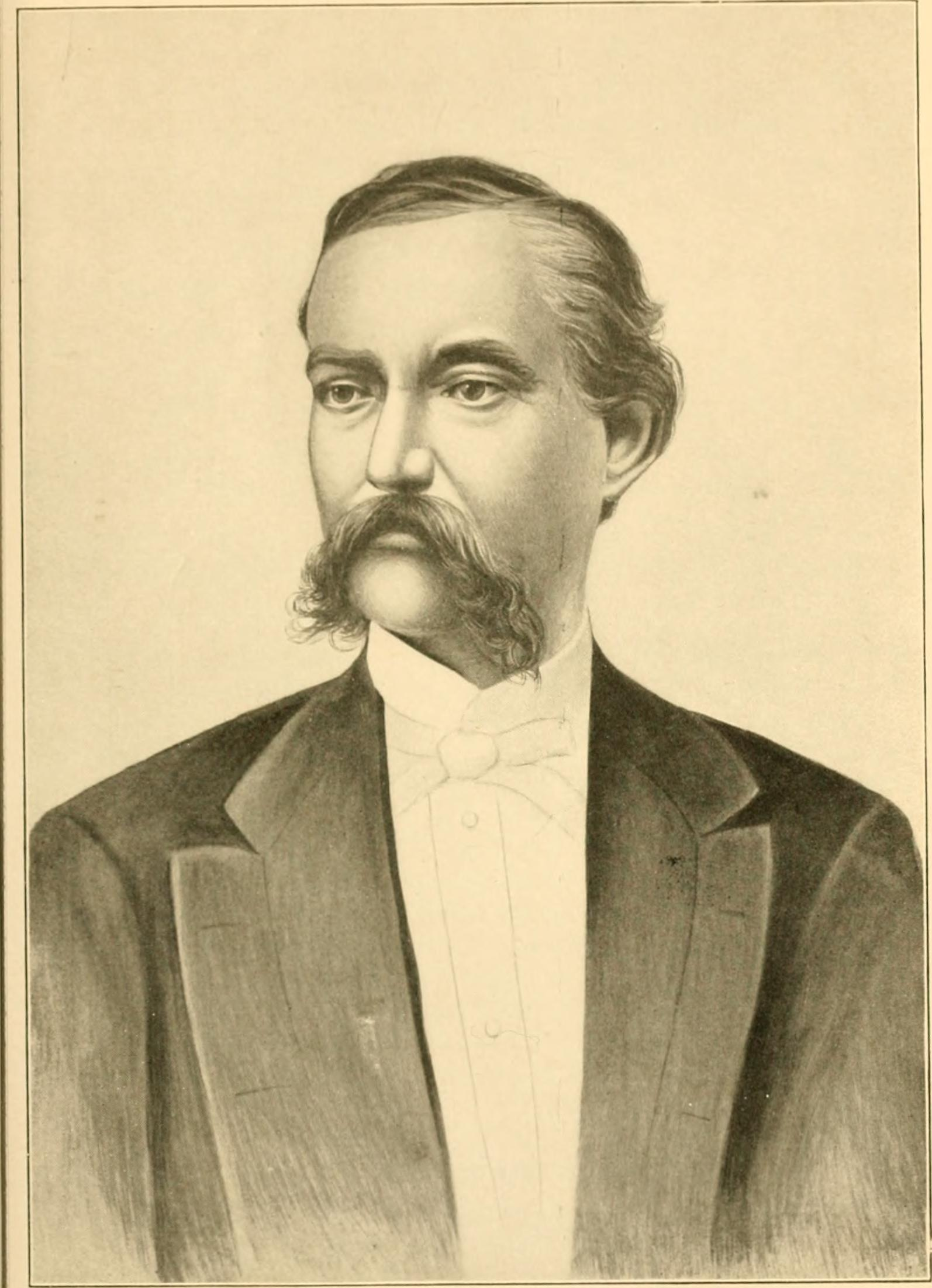
George G. Barnard.

George Gardner Barnard (c. 1829 Poughkeepsie, Dutchess County, New York – April 27, 1879 New York City) was an American lawyer and politician from New York. He was one of only four people ever tried by the New York Court for the Trial of Impeachments.

== Life ==
He was the son of Frederic Barnard and Margaret (Allen) Barnard. He graduated from Yale College in 1847. Then he studied law with his brother Joseph F. Barnard, who was later Presiding Justice of the 2nd District of the New York Supreme Court. George was admitted to the bar, and began practice in Poughkeepsie, but soon went to California and practiced law there. In 1856, he returned to the East, and practiced law in New York City in partnership with Joseph J. Chambers.

In November 1857, Barnard was elected on the Tammany Hall ticket Recorder of New York City, and remained in office from 1858 until the end of 1860. He presided at the trial of "Dab" Cunningham for the murder of "Paudeen" McLaughlin. On June 29, 1859, Barnard married Frances Anderson, and they had six children.

Clarence Stedman, a stockbroker and writer, once said the judge George Bernard "numbered among the Vanderbilt properties." Implying he was owned by The Commodore Cornelius Vanderbilt. Barnard was a man who appreciated fashion, he dressed like a riverboat gambler. His shirts were ruffled, his bow ties white, and he wore a Stetson at a rakish angle atop his head. He completed the picture with a droopy mustache that ran to the bottom of his cheeks. In court he put his feet on the bench, slurped brandy, and whittled with a pocketknife while insulting lawyers who came before him. He had failed as a prospector in California and was serving as the New York City recorder when William Magear Tweed, the boss of New York politics, put him on the bench. The appointment shocked Bernard's brother, who said, "George knows as much about law as a yellow dog"

=== Impeachment ===
In November 1860, Barnard was elected to an 8-year term on the Supreme Court (1st District), and re-elected in 1868. Barnard became involved in a series of railroad litigations, beginning with the Erie War, when in February 1868 — on the petition of Att. Gen. Marshall B. Champlain — he removed Daniel Drew as Director and Treasurer of the railroad, and appointed Cornelius Vanderbilt's son-in-law George A. Osgood as Receiver for $10,000,000 of new Erie Railroad stock.

In November 1868, Barnard appointed Jay Gould as Receiver of the Erie Railroad, but a week later Judge Josiah Sutherland vacated Barnard's order, and appointed Judge Henry E. Davis as Receiver instead.

In August 1869, during the struggle for the Albany and Susquehanna Railroad, Judge Rufus W. Peckham appointed Robert H. Pruyn as Receiver, but Barnard vacated Peckham's order, and appointed James Fisk Jr. instead.

Eight suits and cross-suits followed, and an armed attempt by Fisk and Gould — involving more than 1,000 men on both sides — tried to seize the railroad by force, but Pruyn was confirmed as Receiver anyway. Barnard continued to favor Fisk and Gould in the railroad litigations, culminating in his seizing 16 suits from the New York City Superior Court and the New York City Court of Common Pleas, so he could try them himself in the Supreme Court. This was reversed later by the General Term (now called the Appellate Division), affirming that a case must be tried in the court where it was brought.

In March 1872, Barnard was impeached by the New York State Assembly. The Impeachment Court (consisting of the Judges of the New York Court of Appeals and the New York State Senators) convened at Saratoga Springs in July, Lt. Gov. Allen C. Beach presided. On August 19, 1872, Barnard was convicted unanimously, and was removed from office. The court also barred Barnard from ever holding public office in the State thereafter, with only two contrary votes (cast by Senators William Johnson and Jarvis Lord).

Barnard died in 1879 from Bright's disease at his residence, 23 West Twenty-Third Street, in New York City, and was buried at Green-Wood Cemetery.

== See also ==
- Clarissa Caldwell Lathrop

== Sources ==
- Democratic Primary Nominations in NYT on October 17, 1857 [gives wrong middle initial "C."]
- EX-JUDGE BARNARD DEAD in NYT on April 28, 1879 [states wrong college "Union"; and gives approximate age as "about 55 years"]
- EX-JUDGE BARNARD'S FUNERAL in NYT on May 1, 1879 [mentions coffin plate saying "Died April 27, 1879, aged 49 years."]
- Obituary Record of Graduates (Yale University, 1880; page 359) [gives birthyear "1829" and "died aged 50 years"]
- The Jubilee Anniversary Report of the Class of 1847, Yale University, 1847-1897 (page 14) [gives birthdate "January 19, 1828"]
- On This Day: May 25, 1872 a cartoon showing the corrupt judges, originally from Harper's Weekly
- Thirty Years of New York Politics Up-to-date by Matthew Patrick Breen (Arno Press, 1974; pages 385ff, with portrait of Barnard)

Legal offices
| Preceded by James M. Smith, Jr. | Recorder of New York City; 1858–1860 | Succeeded by John T. Hoffman |
