= Beatrice Beckley =

English-born actress

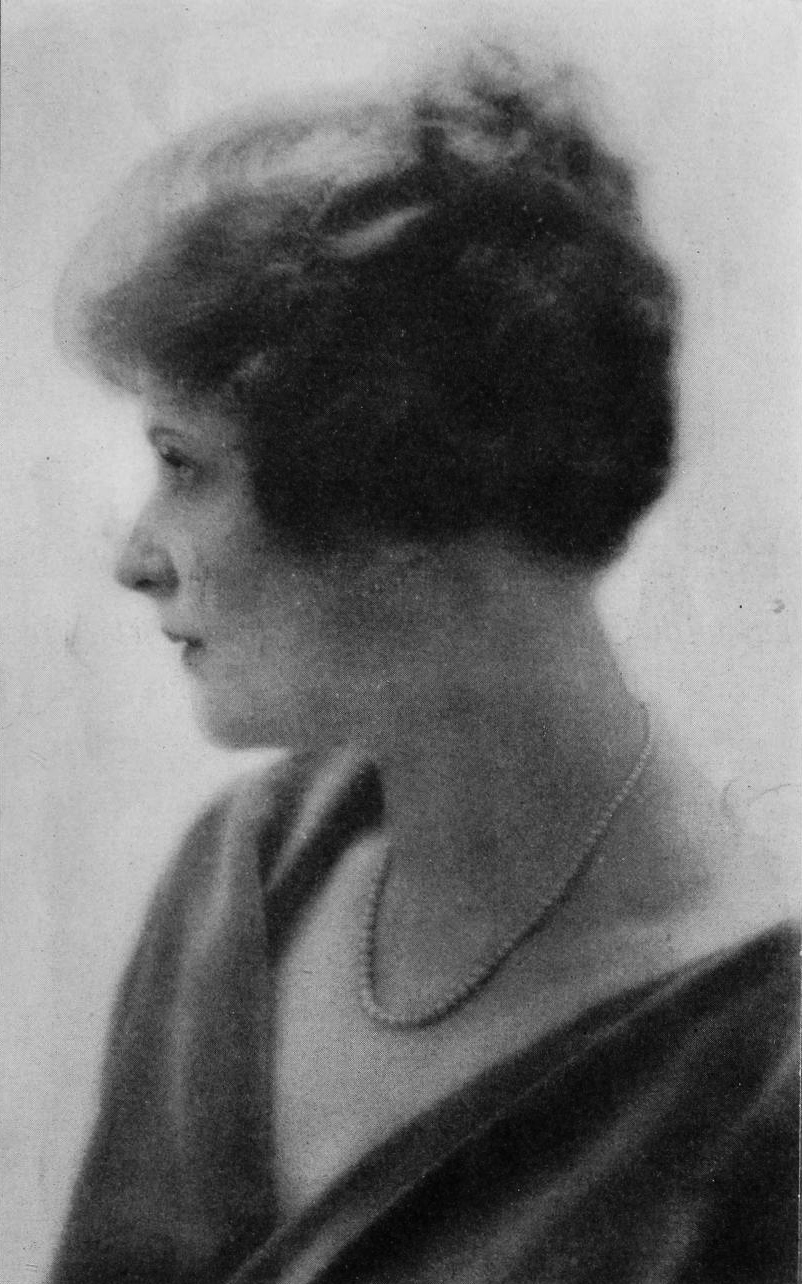
- Born: Beatrice Mary Beckley; 4 June 1882; Hampstead, London
- Died: 8 February 1959 (aged 74); Monte Carlo, Monaco
- Occupation: Stage actress
- Spouse: James K. Hackett (m. 1911; died 1926)

Beatrice Mary Beckley (4 June 1882 – 8 February 1959) was an English-born American actress of stage and screen.

== Biography ==
Beckley was born in Hampstead, London, to Lt. Col. Thomas Beckley and Emily Margaretta Hernulewicz. She was trained by Geneviève Ward. Her first appearance on the stage was in an amateur production of W S Gilbert's Pygmalion and Galatea at Hampstead Town Hall. She made her stage debut in London in a 1901 production of H. V. Esmond's The Wilderness before moving to the United States. She spent four seasons with the company of James K. Hackett, before marrying him in a lawyer's office in Milwaukee on 16 December 1911.

Beckley appeared in many theater productions in the United States, including main roles in The Walls of Jericho, Samson, and The Prisoner of Zenda, opposite Hackett. She also reprised her stage roles in film adaptations of The Prisoner of Zenda (1913) and Should a Husband Forgive? (1919).

When her husband died in Paris on 8 November 1926, he was cremated there, and his ashes taken for interment in the family vault at the Woodlawn Cemetery in New York. Beckley inherited a life interest in most of Hackett's property and more than US$273,000. When she died her estate was valued at £5127.

She died of complications from Parkinson's disease at the Hôtel du Louvre in Monte Carlo, aged 73.
