= John W. Goff =

American lawyer and judge

John William Goff, Sr.
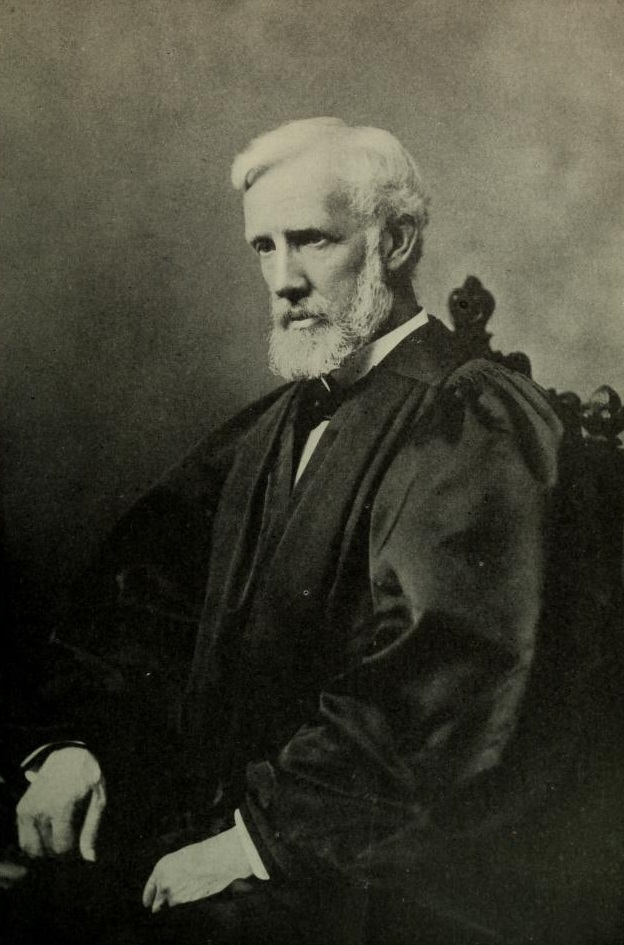
- Portrait of John W. Goff
- Born: January 1, 1848; County Wexford, Ireland
- Died: November 9, 1924 (aged 76)

John William Goff Sr. (January 1, 1848 – November 9, 1924) was an American lawyer and judge from New York City.

== Early life and education ==
Born in County Wexford, Ireland, Goff emigrated with his family to the United States while still a child. The family settled in New York City, where Goff worked for ten years as a clerk in a dry goods store while attending night classes at Cooper Union. In 1865, he took a job as a junior clerk in an attorney's office and eventually was admitted to the bar.

== Politics ==
=== Ireland ===
Goff was a committed Irish nationalist and in 1875 he played a prominent part in arranging for the rescue of six Fenian rebels imprisoned in a British penal colony in Western Australia. The seaborne expedition, which successfully evaded Royal Navy patrols, involving the New Bedford whaler Catalpa, was popularly known as 'Goff's Irish Rescue Party'.

=== New York City ===
In 1888, Goff was appointed as Assistant New York County District Attorney by D.A. John R. Fellows.

In November 1890, Goff ran on the County Democracy (Anti-Tammany) ticket to succeed Fellows as District Attorney, but was defeated by Tammany man De Lancey Nicoll.

Goff became involved with work for the Society for the Prevention of Crime. He made the acquaintance of the reforming clergyman Charles Henry Parkhurst and became prominent among the ranks of those critical of vice and police corruption in Manhattan.

In 1894, Republican boss Thomas Platt, seeking political advantage over his enemies at Tammany Hall, arranged for the establishment of the Lexow Committee to investigate corruption in the NYPD. Goff was appointed Chief Counsel to the committee. He interrogated corrupt police Commissioner John McClave, the notoriously brutal Inspector Alexander S. Williams, and Superintendent Thomas F. Byrnes, the former head of the New York City Detective Bureau noted for giving his prisoners the "third degree."

His investigation led to support from several Anti-Tammany organizations for Mayor of New York City in October 1894, but Goff declined to run for the office. Instead, he ran on the Anti-Tammany ticket as Recorder of New York City and won.

=== New York Supreme Court ===
In 1906, Goff was elected to the (trial-level) New York Supreme Court on a fusion ticket nominated by Democrats and William Randolph Hearst's Independence League. Goff remained on the bench until the end of 1918 when he reached the constitutional age limit.

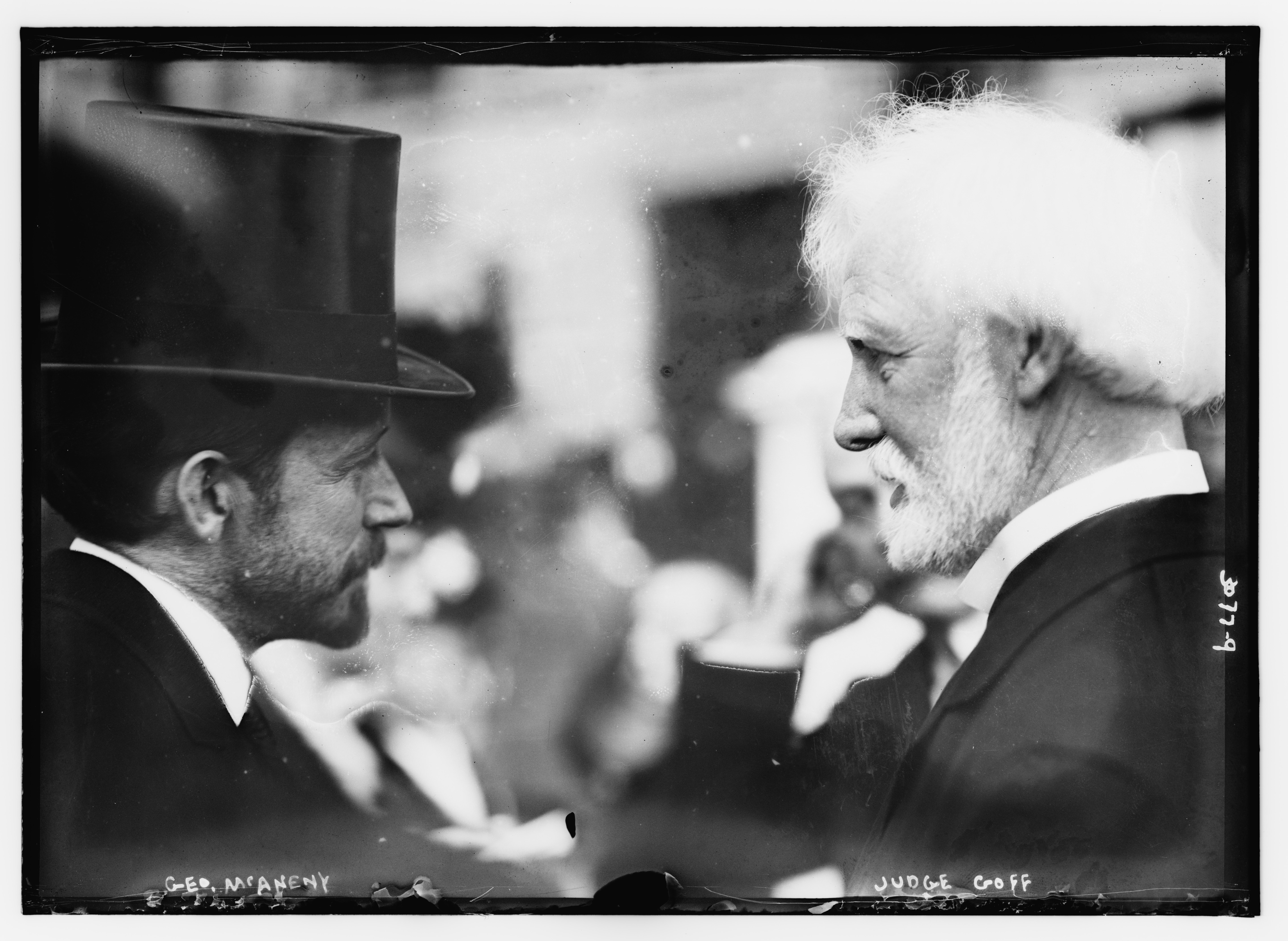
George McAneny and Judge Goff in 1914

In October 1912, Goff presided over the first trial of Charles Becker, a police lieutenant charged with arranging the murder of a gambler named Herman Rosenthal. The trial was notable for the extreme speed at which Goff ran the proceedings, which lasted about two weeks. Becker was found guilty, but the verdict was later reversed on the grounds that Goff had heavily favored the prosecution. In a 6 to 1 ruling, The Court of Appeals charged that "haste seemed to become the essence of the trial." Goff was also reprimanded for repeatedly denying the defense's requests for adjournment. When Becker received a re-trial, he was found guilty again.

In 1916 Goff helped form the Irish Race Convention which had 2300 delegates. The Convention created the Friends of Irish Freedom organization with the stated objective of "to encourage and assist any movement that will tend to bring about the national independence of Ireland."

In retirement, Goff lived on a farm in upstate New York, where he raised herons.

== Legacy ==
Goff was never a learned man — his politely-worded entry in the Dictionary of American Biography admits that "he could never be described as a scholar" – but was widely regarded, among his contemporaries, as the great terror of the New York City Bar Association.

The criminal lawyer and Assistant District Attorney Newman Levy described him as "the cruelest, most sadistic judge we have had in New York this century." According to Andy Logan, the chronicler of the Becker case, "distinguished members of the bar at the height of their careers confessed to waking up in their beds in a cold sweat, having heard in nightmares the sound of that low, sibilant voice saying 'Buzz, buzz, buzz, buzz, guilty!' — a verdict he pronounced, it seemed to them, with joy."

== Sources ==
- FAVOR J. W. GOFF FOR MAYOR in NYT on October 4, 1894
- MR. OTTENDORFER RESIGNS in NYT on October 4, 1894
- WILLIAM L. STRONG FOR MAYOR in NYT on October 6, 1894
- STRONG!; TAMMANY OVERWHELMED BY A PLURALITY OF ABOUT 50,000 in NYT on November 7, 1894
- CAREER OF THE RECORDER-ELECT in NYT on November 7, 1894
- JUDICIARY TICKET NAMED BY TAMMANY in NYT on October 11, 1906

Legal offices
Preceded by Frederick Smyth	Recorder of New York City; 1895–1906	Succeeded by Francis S. McAvoy
