= Frederick A. Tallmadge =

American lawyer and politician (1792–1869)

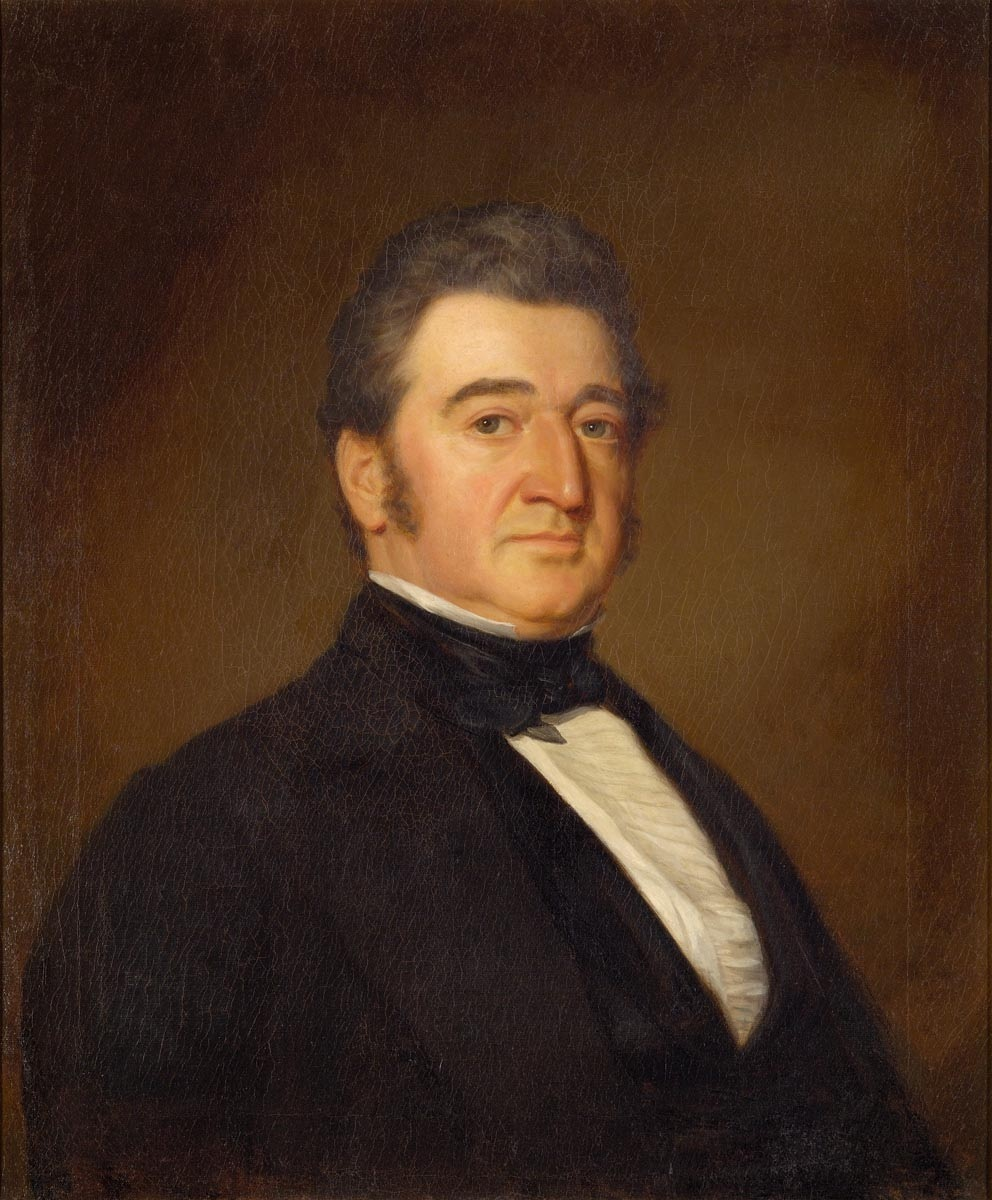
- Portrait by John Vanderlyn, 1849

Clerk of the Court of Appeals
- In office January 1, 1863 – December 31, 1865
- Preceded by: Charles Hughes
- Succeeded by: Patrick H. Jones

Member of the United States House of Representatives from New York's 5th District
- In office March 4, 1847 – March 3, 1849
- Preceded by: Thomas M. Woodruff
- Succeeded by: George Briggs

Recorder of New York City
- In office January 1, 1849 – December 31, 1851
- Preceded by: John B. Scott
- Succeeded by: Francis R. Tillou
- In office 1841 – 1846
- Preceded by: Robert H. Morris
- Succeeded by: John B. Scott

Member of the New York State Senate
- In office January 1, 1837– December 31, 1840
- Preceded by: Myndert Van Schaick
- Succeeded by: John B. Scott

Personal details
- Born: Frederick Augustus Tallmadge; August 29, 1792 Litchfield, Connecticut, U.S.
- Died: September 17, 1869 (aged 77) Litchfield, Connecticut, U.S.
- Party: Whig
- Spouse: Elizabeth "Eliza" H. Canfield
- Parent: Benjamin Tallmadge
- Education: Yale College; Litchfield Law School

Military service
- Allegiance: United States of America
- Rank: Captain
- Battles/wars: War of 1812

Frederick Augustus Tallmadge (August 29, 1792 – September 17, 1869) was an American lawyer and politician from New York.

== Life ==
He was born on August 29, 1792, in Litchfield, Connecticut, the son of Benjamin Tallmadge (1754–1835) and Mary Floyd (1764-1805). William Floyd (1734–1821) was his grandfather. He graduated from Yale College in 1811. Then he studied law at Litchfield Law School, was admitted to the bar and commenced practice in New York City in 1813.

== Career ==
Tallmadge served as a captain of the militia in the War of 1812.

He was a member of the Board of Aldermen in 1834 and, under the new city charter, of the Common Council in 1836. He was a member of the New York State Senate (1st D.) from 1837 to 1840, sitting in the 60th, 61st, 62nd and 63rd New York State Legislatures. He was Recorder of New York City from 1841 to 1846, and from 1848 to 1851.

He was elected as a Whig to the 30th United States Congress, holding office from March 4, 1847, to March 3, 1849. He was Superintendent of the Metropolitan Police from 1857 to 1862. In 1861, he ran on the "Independent People's" ticket for Canal Commissioner but was defeated by Democrat William W. Wright. He was Clerk of the New York Court of Appeals from 1863 to 1865, elected in 1862 on the Democratic/Constitutional Union ticket. Afterwards he resumed the practice of law in New York City.

== Personal life ==
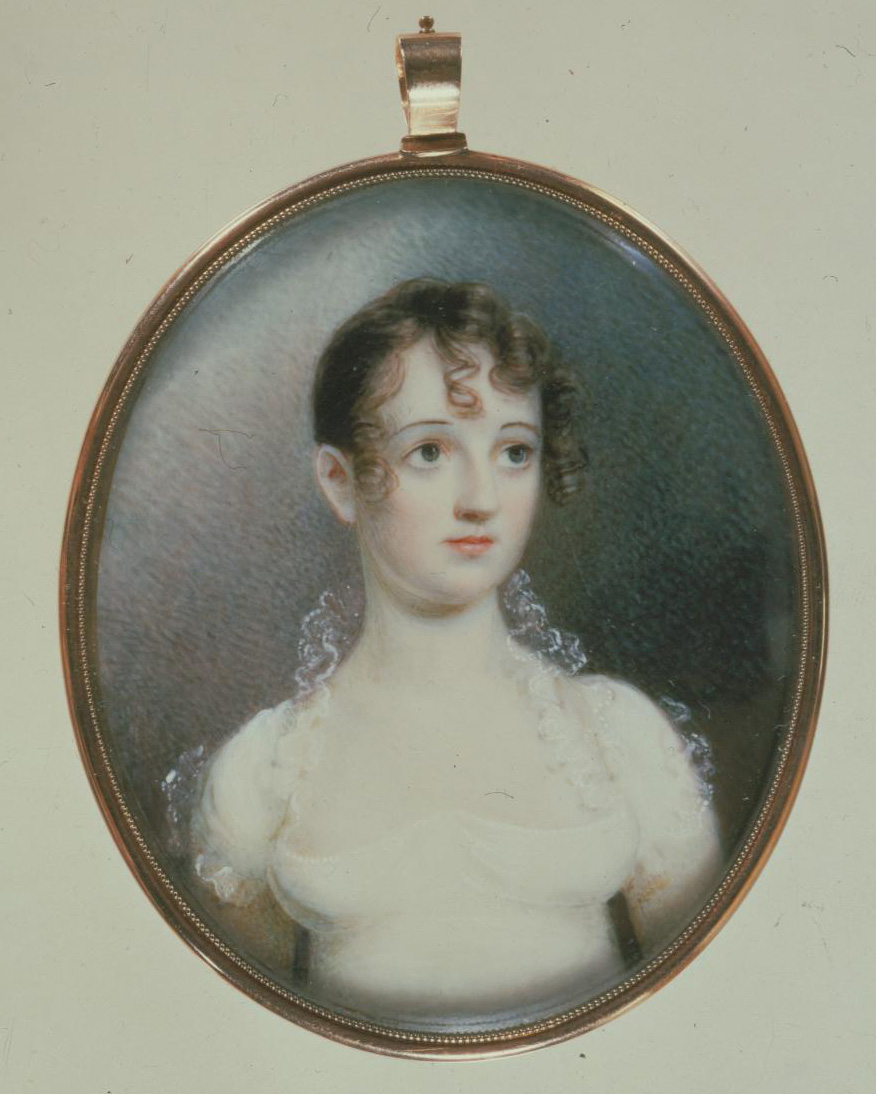
Elizabeth Canfield Tallmadge

He married Elizabeth "Eliza" H. Canfield (1793–1878) and together they had:

- Frederick Samuel Tallmadge (c.1823–1904), who was president of the New York Society of the Sons of the Revolution from 1884 until his death in 1904.

He died on September 17, 1869, at the home of his daughter in Litchfield, Connecticut; and was buried at the East Cemetery.

== Sources ==
- United States Congress. "Frederick A. Tallmadge (id: T000030)". Biographical Directory of the United States Congress.

Legal offices
Preceded by Charles Hughes	Clerk of the Court of Appeals; January 1, 1863 – December 31, 1865	Succeeded by Patrick H. Jones
Preceded by John B. Scott	Recorder of New York City; January 1, 1849 – December 31, 1851	Succeeded by Francis R. Tillou
U.S. House of Representatives
Preceded by Thomas M. Woodruff	Member of the U.S. House of Representatives from New York's 5th congressional district March 4, 1847 – March 3, 1849	Succeeded by George Briggs
Legal offices
Preceded by Robert H. Morris	Recorder of New York City; 1841–1846	Succeeded by John B. Scott
New York State Senate
Preceded by Myndert Van Schaick	New York State Senate; First District (Class 2); January 1, 1837– December 31, 1840	Succeeded by John B. Scott
