= Robert H. Morris (mayor) =

American politician

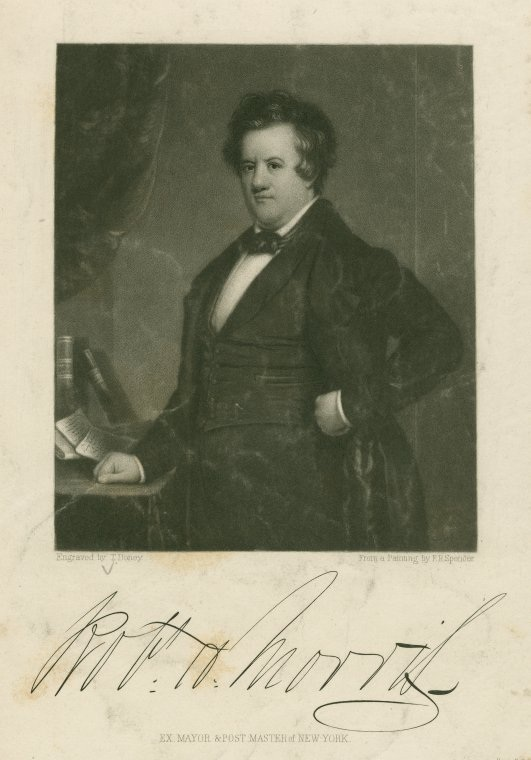

65th Mayor of New York City
- In office 1841–1844
- Preceded by: Isaac Varian
- Succeeded by: James Harper

Personal details
- Born: February 15, 1808 New York City, New York, U.S.
- Died: October 24, 1855 (aged 47) Astoria, Queens, New York, U.S.
- Party: Democratic
- Education: Washington Seminary
- Profession: Attorney

Robert Hunter Morris (February 15, 1808 – October 24, 1855) was an attorney and the 65th Mayor of New York City.

== Early career ==
Morris was born in New York City. His father Robert Morris, a prominent judge, moved the family to Claverack, New York, where Morris was raised. He attended Washington Seminary, afterwards studying law and attaining admission to the bar. He initially practiced in Columbia County before moving to New York City.

He served as an assistant to U.S. Attorney James A. Hamilton and as a member of the New York State Assembly in 1833 and 1834. In 1838, New York Governor William L. Marcy appointed Morris Recorder of New York City, a position equivalent to a deputy mayor. He served in that capacity until 1841, when Governor William H. Seward removed him from office in connection with the Glentworth scandal.

== Glentworth incident ==
The Glentworth conspiracy involved a plot by tobacco inspector James B. Glentworth to send workers from Pennsylvania to New York under the guise of laying pipes for the city, but in reality to cast votes for Whig presidential candidate William Henry Harrison. Morris, the district attorney, and then-Mayor Isaac Varian feared that documents essential to the ensuing grand jury would be destroyed, and so went personally to seize the documents. Governor Seward removed Morris from office for his actions.

== Later career ==
Morris, a Democrat, became involved in the Tammany Hall political machine in the early 1840s. He was elected mayor in 1841 by a slim margin, and again in 1842 and 1843 by more substantial margins. While serving as mayor in 1841, Morris took part in the investigation and arrest of John C. Colt for the murder of Samuel Adams.

In 1845 Morris was appointed Postmaster of New York City, and he served until 1849. In 1852 he became a justice of the New York Supreme Court.

Morris died in New York City on October 24, 1855. He was buried at St. Ann's Episcopal Church in South Bronx.

== Bibliography ==
- Wilson, James Grant (1892). The Memorial History of the City of New-York: From Its First Settlement to the Year 1892. New York History Company.
- "Death of Hon. Judge Morris". Obituaries. The New York Times. 26 October 1855.
- Obituary Addresses on the Occasion of the Death of the Hon. Robert H. Morris. 1855. Hayes, Hincks, Carey and Kempston.

Legal offices
| Preceded by Richard Riker | Recorder of New York City; 1838–1841 | Succeeded by Frederick A. Tallmadge |
Political offices
| Preceded by Isaac Varian | Mayor of New York City; 1841–1844 | Succeeded by James Harper |
