= Frederick Smyth (New York politician) =

American judge and politician

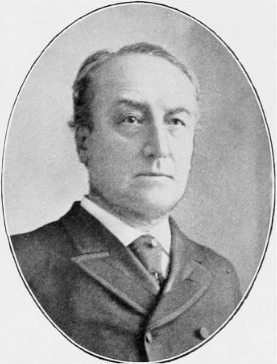

Justice of the New York Supreme Court
- In office November 1895 – August 18, 1900

Personal details
- Born: 1832 Galway, Ireland
- Died: August 18, 1900 (aged 67–68) Atlantic City, New Jersey, US
- Party: Democratic
- Spouse: Anna Augusta Findlay (died 1895)
- Occupation: Lawyer, politician

Frederick Smyth (1832 – August 18, 1900) was an American lawyer and politician from New York.

== Life ==
Frederick Smyth was born in Galway in 1832. He was the son of Matthew Thomas Smyth who was one of the two sheriffs of the City of Galway from 1817 to 1822. After the death of his father, Frederick emigrated to New York City in 1849. He studied law at first with Florence McCarthy, who was elected to the New York City Marine Court in 1850. Smyth then studied law and with John McKeon, and was admitted to the bar in 1855. McKeon had been appointed United States Attorney for the Southern District of New York in 1854, and appointed Smyth as one of his Assistant US Attorneys. At the end of McKeon's term in 1858, Smyth and McKeon formed a law partnership which lasted until the end of 1878.

Smyth was a school commissioner from 1863 to 1865. In November 1875, Smyth ran on the Tammany Hall ticket for Recorder of New York City, but was defeated by John K. Hackett, the incumbent Tammany man who—after having been dropped from the ticket—had been nominated by Republicans and Anti-Tammany Democrats. Smyth was a delegate to the 1876 Democratic National Convention, and later the same year was a presidential elector casting his vote for Samuel J. Tilden and Thomas A. Hendricks. In November 1878, Smyth ran on the Tammany ticket for New York County District Attorney but was defeated by the Republican incumbent Benjamin K. Phelps. In November 1879, Smyth ran on the Tammany ticket for Judge of the Court of Common Pleas, but was defeated by Miles Beach.

After Hackett's death, Smyth was elected on December 31, 1879, by the Board of Supervisors of New York County as Recorder of New York City to fill the vacancy until the next election. In November 1880, Smyth was elected on the Tammany ticket to succeed himself for a term of 14 years, but was defeated for re-election in November 1894 by John W. Goff who was elected on a fusion ticket nominated jointly by all other political organizations and parties, except Tammany.

In May 1895, Smyth was elected Grand Sachem of the Tammany Society. In November 1895, Smyth was elected to a 14-year term on the New York Supreme Court (1st D.). Smyth lived at 15 West Forty-sixth Street, but died from pneumonia during an extended summer vacation at the Hotel Dennis in Atlantic City on August 18, 1900. (states erroneously that his father was "the High Sheriff of the County") He was buried at Green-Wood Cemetery.

Smyth married Anna Augusta Findlay (d. 1895), and their only surviving child was Anna Augusta Smyth who died unmarried in 1924.

Legal offices
Preceded by John K. Hackett	Recorder of New York City; 1879–1894	Succeeded by John W. Goff
