= The Prisoner of Zenda (1913 film) =

1913 film by Edwin Stanton Porter

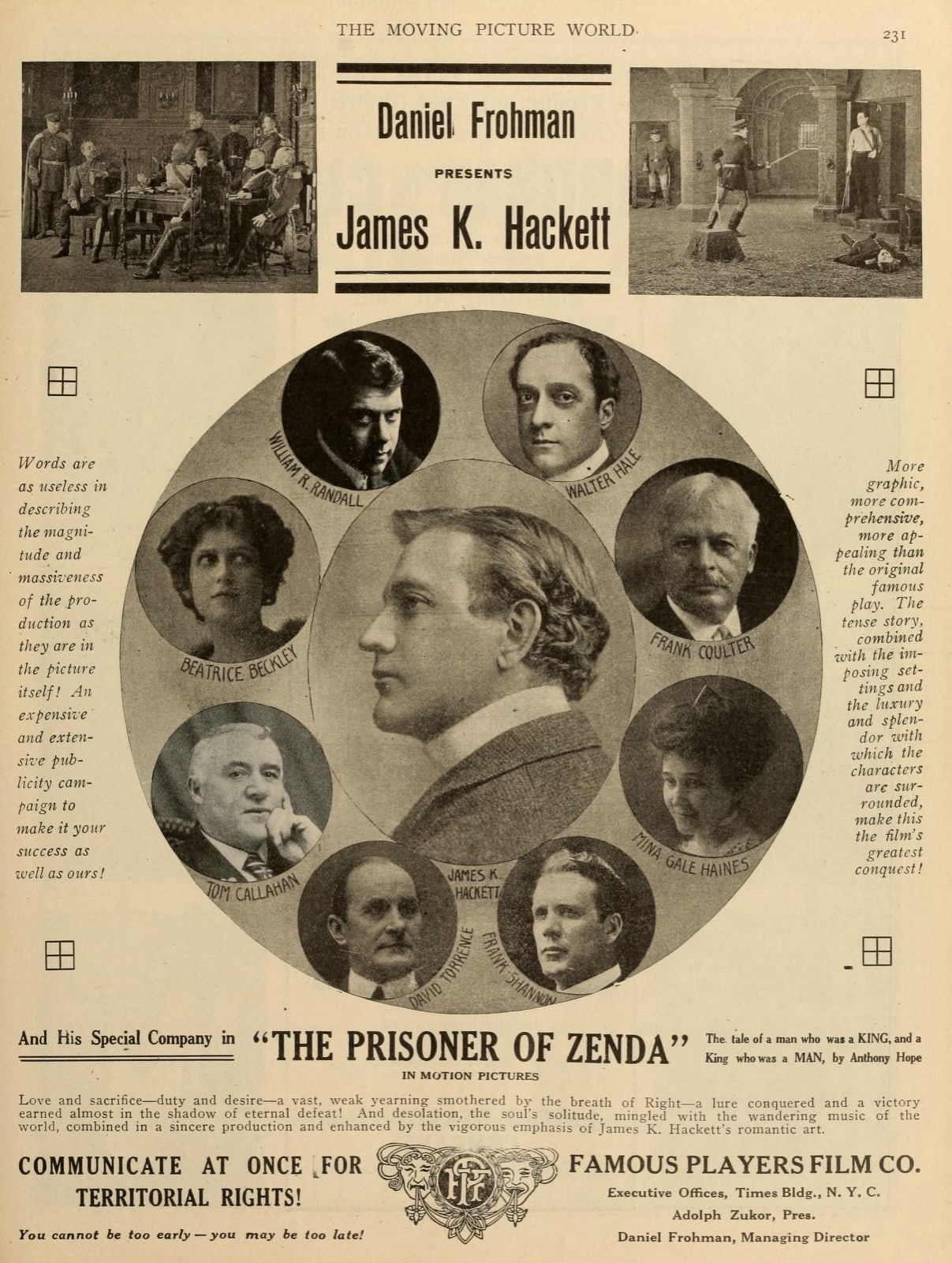
- Advertisement in The Moving Picture World
- Directed by: Edwin S. Porter; Hugh Ford
- Written by: Hugh Ford
- Based on: The Prisoner of Zenda by Anthony Hope
- Produced by: Albert W. Hale; Adolph Zukor
- Starring: James K. Hackett; Beatrice Beckley; David Torrence
- Music by: Joseph Carl Breil (accompaniment)
- Production company: Famous Players Film Company
- Distributed by: State Rights
- Release date: February 18, 1913
- Running time: Four or five reels
- Country: United States
- Language: Silent

The Prisoner of Zenda is a 1913 silent film adaptation of a play by Edward E. Rice, which was in turn based on the 1894 Anthony Hope novel of the same name. It was directed by Edwin S. Porter and Hugh Ford, and starred stage actor James K. Hackett, Beatrice Beckley and David Torrence.

In 1913, Adolph Zukor lured Hackett from the stage to star in a role which Hackett had played in the theater numerous times. Since feature films were in their infancy, Hackett was at first reluctant to take the part, so Zukor tried to convince Hackett in person; as Neal Gabler writes, "When Hackett came to visit Zukor, he was the very picture of the faded matinee idol. He wore a fur-collared coat with frayed sleeves and carried a gold-headed cane".

According to silentera.com, the Library of Congress possesses two paper positive prints, and the International Museum of Photography and Film at George Eastman Museum also has a partial positive print.

== Plot summary ==
King Rudolf of Ruritania is saved from a coup attempt by the help of his lookalike cousin, who falls in love with the king's fiancée.

== Cast ==
- James K. Hackett as Rudolf Rassendyll/King Rudolf of Ruritania
- Beatrice Beckley as Princess Flavia
- David Torrence as Michael, Duke of Strelsau
- Fraser Coalter as Colonel Sapt (as Frazer Coulter)
- William R. Randall as Fritz von Tarlenheim (as C. R. Randall)
- Walter Hale as Rupert of Hentzau
- Frank Shannon as Detchard
- Minna Gale as Antoinette de Mauban (as Mina Gale Haines)
- Charles Green as Johann
- Tom Callahan as Josef
- Sidney Barrington as Marshal Strakencz

== See also ==
- The House That Shadows Built, a 1931 Paramount promotional compilation which includes an excerpt from this film
- Edwin S. Porter filmography
