= Recorder of New York City =

Former municipal officer of New York City

The recorder of New York City was a municipal officer of New York City from 1683 until 1907. He was at times a judge of the Court of General Sessions, the Court of Special Sessions, and the New York Court of Common Pleas; Vice-President of the Board of Supervisors of New York County; Vice-President of the Board of Aldermen of New York City; Deputy Mayor of New York City; a director of the Bank of the Manhattan Company; a commissioner of the city's Sinking fund; a commissioner of the Metropolitan Police Board; and a member of the board of many charitable organizations. The Recorder was not a recorder of deeds; these were kept by the Register of New York City.

== History ==
The first recorders were appointed by the colonial governor, and held the office "during the Governor's pleasure", meaning that there was no defined term of office.

Under the State Constitution of 1777, the recorder was appointed by the Council of Appointment, and held the office "during the Council's pleasure", there being still no defined term of office.

From 1787 to 1875, the recorder was also a member of the Board of Supervisors of the County of New York, which consisted of the mayor, the recorder and the aldermen of New York City. In the absence of the mayor, the recorder presided over the Board.

Under the State Constitution of 1821, the recorder was appointed by the Governor of New York, and confirmed by the New York State Senate, and held the office until the appointment of a successor.

On December 15, 1847, the City Charter was amended, providing for the election of the recorder by popular ballot at the same time of the general elections (the Tuesday after the first Monday in November), to take office on January 1 next for a term of three years.

In 1857, when the New York Metropolitan Police was created, the recorder became one of the commissioners of the Police Board.

The recorder's term was extended to six years during John K. Hackett's first term. After the adoption of the "Judicial Article" in 1869, the Recorder was not considered a municipal officer any more, but a judicial officer. He ceased to be a member of the Board of Supervisors, and his term was extended to 14 years, to match the term length of the other judges and justices of the New York courts.

The recorder remained one of the judges of the Court of General Sessions (the New York City court of general jurisdiction in criminal cases) until the office was abolished in 1907.

== List of Recorders ==
Recorder	Took office	Left office	Party	Notes
James Graham	1683	1689?		Attorney General of Province of New York, 1685
(vacant)	1689?	1691?		
William Pinhorne	1691	1693		New York Supreme Court judge, 1691. New Jersey Supreme Court judge, c.1698. C-in-C New Jersey, 1709.
James Graham	1693	1701		Attorney General of Province of New York, 1685
Abraham Gouverneur	1701	1703		
Sampson Shelton Broughton	1703	1705		Attorney General of Province of New York, 1701
John Tudor	1705	1709		
May Bickley	1709	1712		also acting Attorney General of Province of New York, 1708–12
David Jamison	1712	1725		acting Attorney General of Province of New York, 1712
Francis Harison	1725	1735		
Daniel Horsmanden	1736	1747		also Supreme Court judge, 1737–1747. Chief Justice, 1763.
Simon Johnson	1747	1769		
Thomas Jones	November 19, 1769	October 13, 1773		
Robert R. Livingston	October 13, 1773	1774		Supreme Court judge, 1763
John Watts	1774	February 20, 1784		last recorder appointed by the colonial governor, remained in office until the capture of New York City by the revolutionary forces
Richard Varick	February 20, 1784	September 29, 1789		in 1787 and 1788 also Speaker of the New York State Assembly, and from April 1788 to September 1789 also New York State Attorney General; left both offices upon appointment as Mayor of New York City
Samuel Jones	September 29, 1789	March 28, 1797	Federalist	appointed New York State Comptroller
James Kent	March 28, 1797	February 15, 1798	Federalist	appointed to the New York Supreme Court
Richard Harison	February 15, 1798	August 25, 1801	Federalist	also United States Attorney for the District of New York from 1789 to 1801
John B. Prevost	August 25, 1801	November 10, 1804	Dem.-Rep.	appointed to the Superior Court of the Territory of Orleans
Maturin Livingston	November 10, 1804	March 26, 1806	Dem.-Rep./Lewisite	
Pierre C. Van Wyck	March 26, 1806	February 16, 1807	Dem.-Rep./Clintonian	
Maturin Livingston	February 16, 1807	February 8, 1808	Dem.-Rep./Lewisite	second tenure
Pierre C. Van Wyck	February 8, 1808	February 13, 1810	Dem.-Rep./Clintonian	second tenure
Josiah Ogden Hoffman	February 13, 1810	February 19, 1811	Federalist	
Pierre C. Van Wyck	February 19, 1811	February 8, 1813	Dem.-Rep./Clintonian	third tenure
Josiah Ogden Hoffman	February 8, 1813	March 6, 1815	Federalist	second tenure
Richard Riker	March 6, 1815	April 6, 1819	Dem.-Rep./Clintonian; Dem.-Rep./Bucktail	
Peter A. Jay	April 6, 1819	March 6, 1821	Federalist	
Richard Riker	March 6, 1821	1823	Dem.-Rep./Bucktail	second tenure
Samuel Jones	1823	1824		son of the previous Recorder of the same name
Richard Riker	1824	1838	Dem.-Rep./Bucktail; Democrat	third tenure
Robert H. Morris	1838	1841	Democrat	removed from office by Gov. William H. Seward, but elected Mayor of New York City
Frederick Augustus Tallmadge	1841	1846	Whig	
John B. Scott	1846	December 31, 1848	Democrat	
Frederick Augustus Tallmadge	January 1, 1849	December 31, 1851	Whig	second tenure; first recorder elected by popular ballot
Francis R. Tillou	January 1, 1852	December 31, 1854	Democrat	
James M. Smith, Jr.	January 1, 1855	December 31, 1857	Democrat	
George G. Barnard	January 1, 1858	December 31, 1860	Democrat	
John T. Hoffman	January 1, 1861	December 31, 1865	Democrat	elected Mayor of New York City during his second term
John K. Hackett	March 6, 1866	December 26, 1879	Democrat	elected by the Board of Supervisors to fill vacancy; then elected as a Democrat to two terms (1867–69 and 1870–75); in 1875 elected on Republican and Anti-Tammany tickets; died in office
Frederick Smyth	December 31, 1879	1894	Democrat	elected by the Board of Supervisors to fill vacancy; in 1880 elected to full 14-year term
John W. Goff	January 1, 1895	December 31, 1906	Goff was an Anti-Tammany Democrat, elected on a fusion ticket nominated by numerous organizations, including the Republicans	elected to the New York Supreme Court
Francis S. McAvoy	January 22, 1907	December 31, 1907	Democrat	elected by the Board of Aldermen, to fill vacancy; office abolished

== Sources ==
- The New York Civil List compiled by Franklin Benjamin Hough (page 428; Weed, Parsons and Co., 1858)
- Courts and Lawyers of New York: A History, 1609-1925 by Alden Chester & E. Melvin Williams (Vol. II, page 896)
- Historical Ssketch of the Board of Supervisors of the County of New York (pages 11ff)
- THE RECORDERSHIP in NYT on January 12, 1866
