= Francis S. McAvoy =

American lawyer and politician

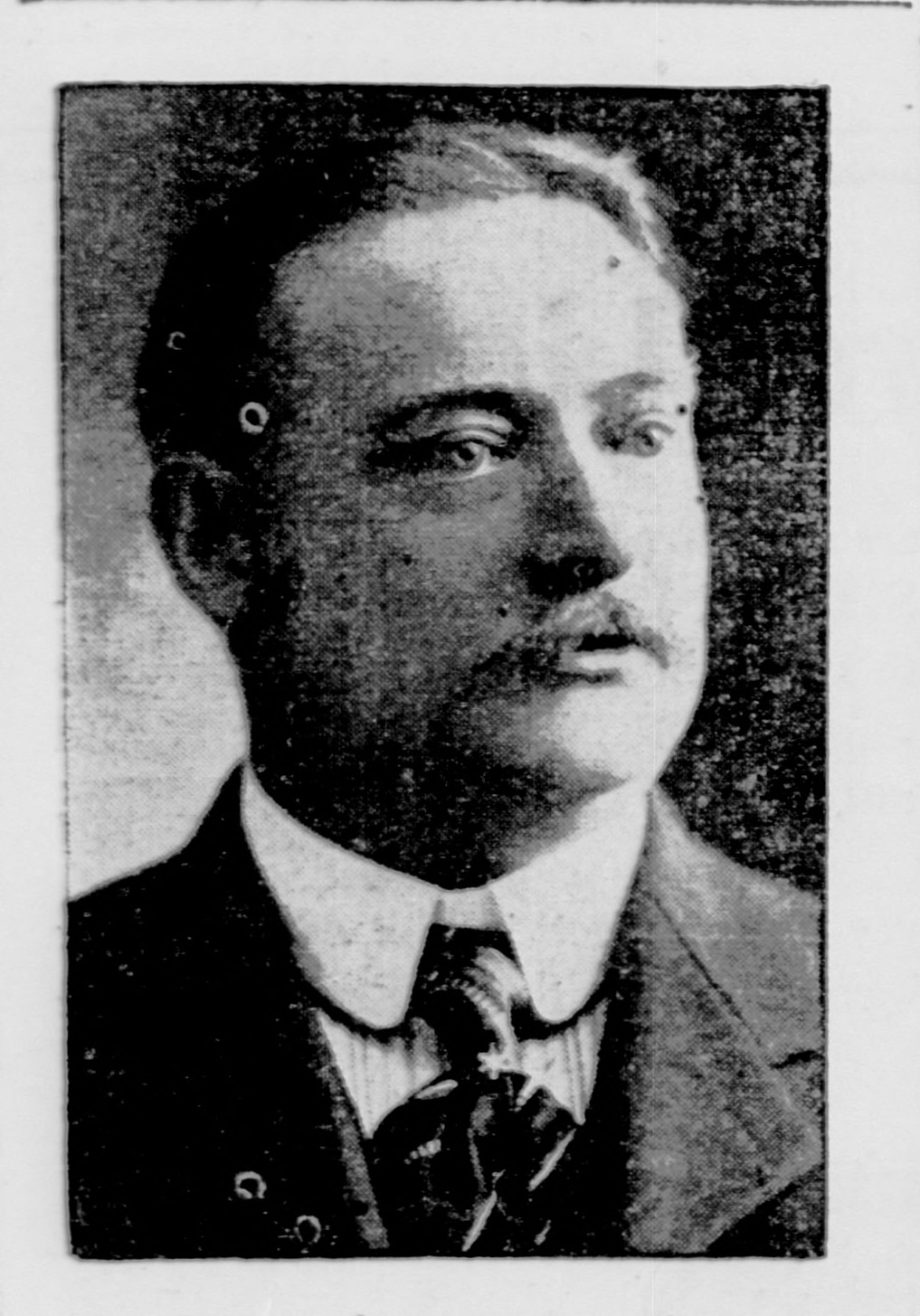

Francis Stephen McAvoy (c. 1856 – August 6, 1926) was an American lawyer and politician from New York City.

== Life ==
He graduated from Columbia Law School. In May 1905, he was appointed by Mayor George B. McClellan as a Police Magistrate, and in July a judge of the Court of Special Sessions. In November 1906, McAvoy ran on the Tammany Hall ticket for the Court of General Sessions but was defeated by Republican Otto A. Rosalsky, who had been endorsed by the Independence League in defiance of the Tammany/Independence L. fusion ticket.

At the same election, Recorder John W. Goff was elected to the New York Supreme Court. The vacancy was to be filled by the Board of Aldermen, but the election was deadlocked because no party had a majority. The Republicans voted for Alderman James Cowden Meyers, the Democrats for McAvoy, and the Municipal Ownership Leaguers for Judge John Palmieri. On the first ballot, on January 7, 1907, Meyers had 34, McAvoy 25 and Palmieri 7 votes. The deadlock continued when, on January 15, suddenly the M.O.L. aldermen voted for Rufus B. Cowing instead of Palmieri. Hours later Alderman Clifford was arrested and accused of having received $6,000 to change the vote of his party friends. After another week of accusations and much noise in the press, McAvoy received the votes of the M.O.L. and was elected on the 24th ballot (McAvoy 42; Meyers 35 votes) on January 22, 1907, as Recorder of New York City to fill the vacancy until the end of the year.

Due to a prolonged illness, McAvoy took his seat on the bench in the Court of General Sessions (of which the Recorder was one of the judges) only on May 6, 1907. In the meanwhile, D.A. William Travers Jerome and Gov. Charles Evans Hughes introduced legislation in the New York State Assembly which abolished the office of Recorder—one of the oldest offices in New York, in existence since 1683—at the end of the year, and called for the election of an additional judge of General Sessions instead.

McAvoy died suddenly on August 6, 1926, dropping dead on the corner of 152nd Street and Broadway in Manhattan while on the way to his law office; He was buried at Saint Raymond's Cemetery New in the Bronx.

First Deputy New York City Police Commissioner Thomas F. McAvoy was his brother.

Legal offices
Preceded by John W. Goff	Recorder of New York City; 1907	Succeeded by office abolished
