= John K. Hackett =

American lawyer and politician

John Keteltas Hackett (February 13, 1821 in Utica, Oneida County, New York – December 26, 1879 in New York City) was an American lawyer and politician from New York.

== Life ==
He was the son of actor James Henry Hackett (1800–1871). He attended Borland & Forrester Private Academy and Columbia College, and graduated from New York University in 1837. Then he studied law with Joshua N. Spencer in Utica, and from 1840 on with William M. Evarts and Jonathan Prescott Hall in New York City. He was admitted to the bar in 1842, and practiced in New York City. He married Laura Jane Hall (1825–1897), and their only child was Minnie Laura (Hackett) Trowbridge (1850–1914).

In 1849, he went to San Francisco, California, and practiced law there in partnership with Eugene Casserly. Hackett was elected Corporation Counsel of San Francisco, and served one term.

In 1857, he returned to New York City, and soon afterwards entered city politics being elected Secretary of Mozart Hall, the Anti-Tammany Hall Democratic organization founded by Fernando Wood. He was appointed by John E. Develin as Assistant Corporation Counsel of New York City. As such, in 1862, Hackett contested John Kelly's claim for $20,000 sheriff's fees, thus gaining Kelly's enmity.

Hackett was still in office when Recorder John T. Hoffman took office as Mayor of New York City on January 1, 1866. To fill the vacancy proved difficult, the Board of Supervisors of New York County having six Republicans and six Democrats. On March 6, 1866, after more than two months of deadlock, Hackett was elected Recorder of New York City, and was elected to succeed himself for a full three-year term, running on the Tammany ticket in November 1866. In November 1869, he was re-elected on the Tammany ticket, the term having been extended to six years in the meanwhile. Hackett was responsible for doing some of the judicial bidding of ward chiefs. During a period that lasted almost 2 years, Hackett dismissed 170 court cases. After succeeding William M. Tweed as boss of Tammany Hill, Kelly launched a personal attack on Hackett, and on October 12, 1875, had Frederick Smyth nominated for Recorder. The next day, Hackett was nominated on the Republican ticket, and then endorsed by the Anti-Tammany Democrats. Defeating Smyth, he was elected to a fourteen-year term, the term having been extended again, to match the duration of the term of the other judges and justices of the various courts in New York.

In 1878, Hackett began to suffer from a prolonged illness, and spent a two-month-long summer vacation in Europe. Although at first slightly improving, his health deteriorated again, so that Hackett sat for the last time as judge on the bench of the Court of General Sessions on October 1, 1878. In August 1879, he caught a severe cold while on a hunting and fishing trip around Islip, Long Island, which evolved into bronchitis, pericarditis and dropsy. Five months later, he died at his residence, 72 Park Avenue (Manhattan), without having recovered his health. He was buried at Woodlawn Cemetery (Bronx).

The actor James Keteltas Hackett (1869–1926) was his half-brother. In 1914, James inherited the larger part of the estate, valued at $1,389,049.46, from his niece Minnie who aged 57 had married Francis Emory Trowbridge (1845–1910), and died without issue.

Legal offices
Preceded by John T. Hoffman	Recorder of New York City; 1866–1879	Succeeded by Frederick Smyth
