= James Henry Hackett =

American actor (1800–1871)

- Born: March 15, 1800; New York City, New York
- Died: December 28, 1871; Queens, New York
- Occupation: Stage actor
- Spouse: Catherine Leebuff
- Children: James Keteltas Hackett

James Henry Hackett (March 15, 1800 – December 28, 1871) was an American actor.

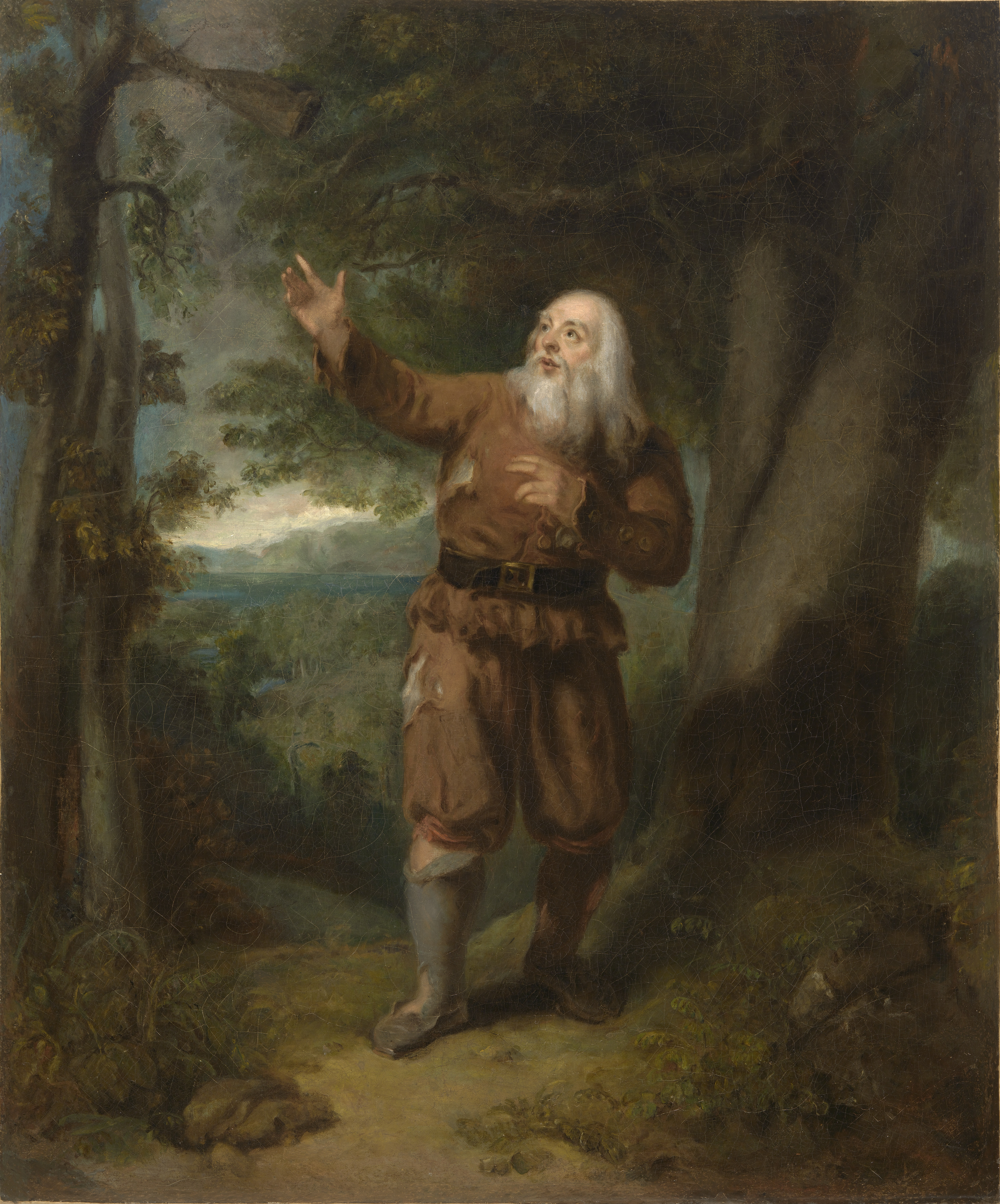
James Henry Hackett in the Character of Rip Van Winkle by Henry Inman, 1832

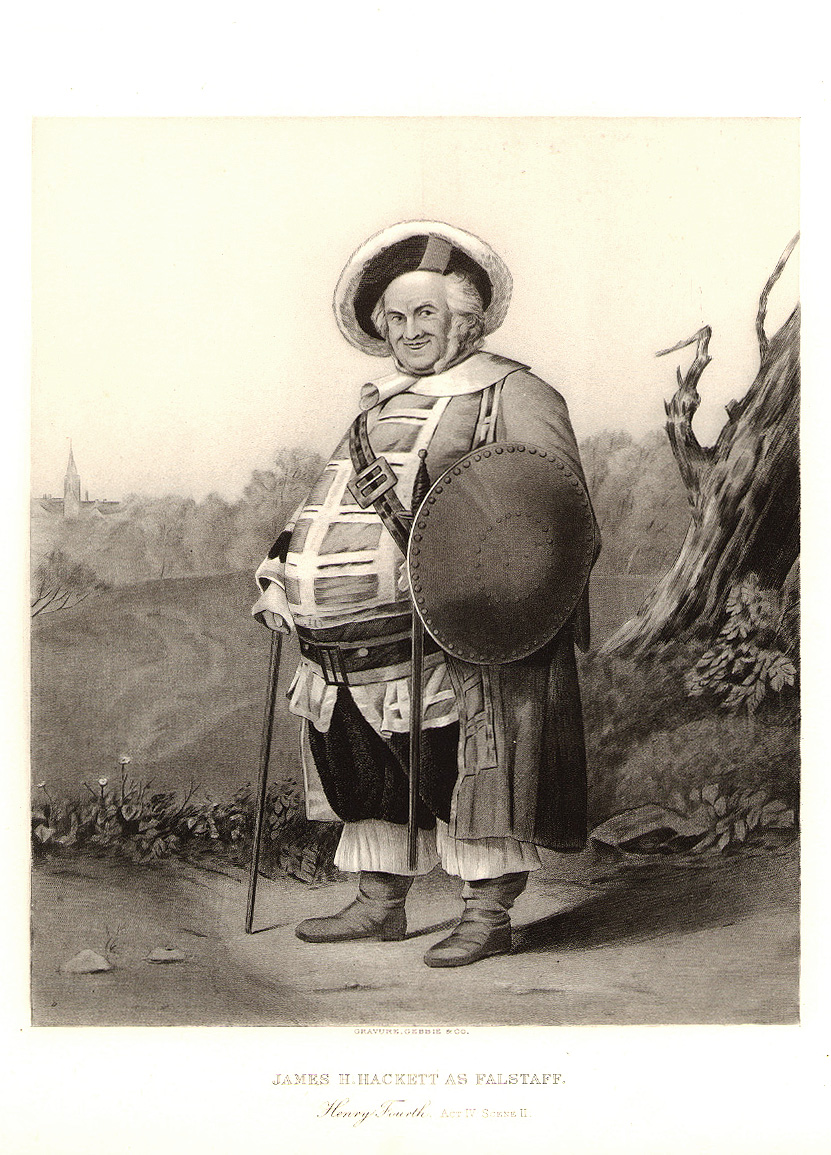
J. H. Hackett as Falstaff

Hackett was born in New York City. He entered Columbia College in 1815 but withdrew. He then studied law privately. In 1818, he became a wholesale clerk in a grocery firm in New York. In 1819, he married Catherine Leebuff, a young actress. After an unsuccessful entry into business, he went on the stage in March 1826 playing the role of Justice Woodcock in Love of a Village. He played opposite his wife in the play. He soon established a reputation as a player of eccentric character parts. The next year, he played at the Covent Garden in London with success. He traveled back and forth between the United States and Britain, achieving a reputation in the works of Shakespeare, particularly Falstaff. In 1834 he commissioned a play from writer John Neal to suit his strength with eccentric characters but rejected the comedy upon receipt.

As a manager and impresario, he is remembered, among other things, for having engaged the troupe of Italian opera singers who formed the nucleus of the first season (1854–55) of the Academy of Music in New York City. After that, he appeared only rarely on the public stage. He was the author of Notes and Comments on Shakespeare (1863).

He was the father of Recorder John K. Hackett and actor James Keteltas Hackett.

Hackett died on December 28, 1871, in Jamaica, Long Island, New York.
