= Tokuko Takagi =

Japanese dancer and actress

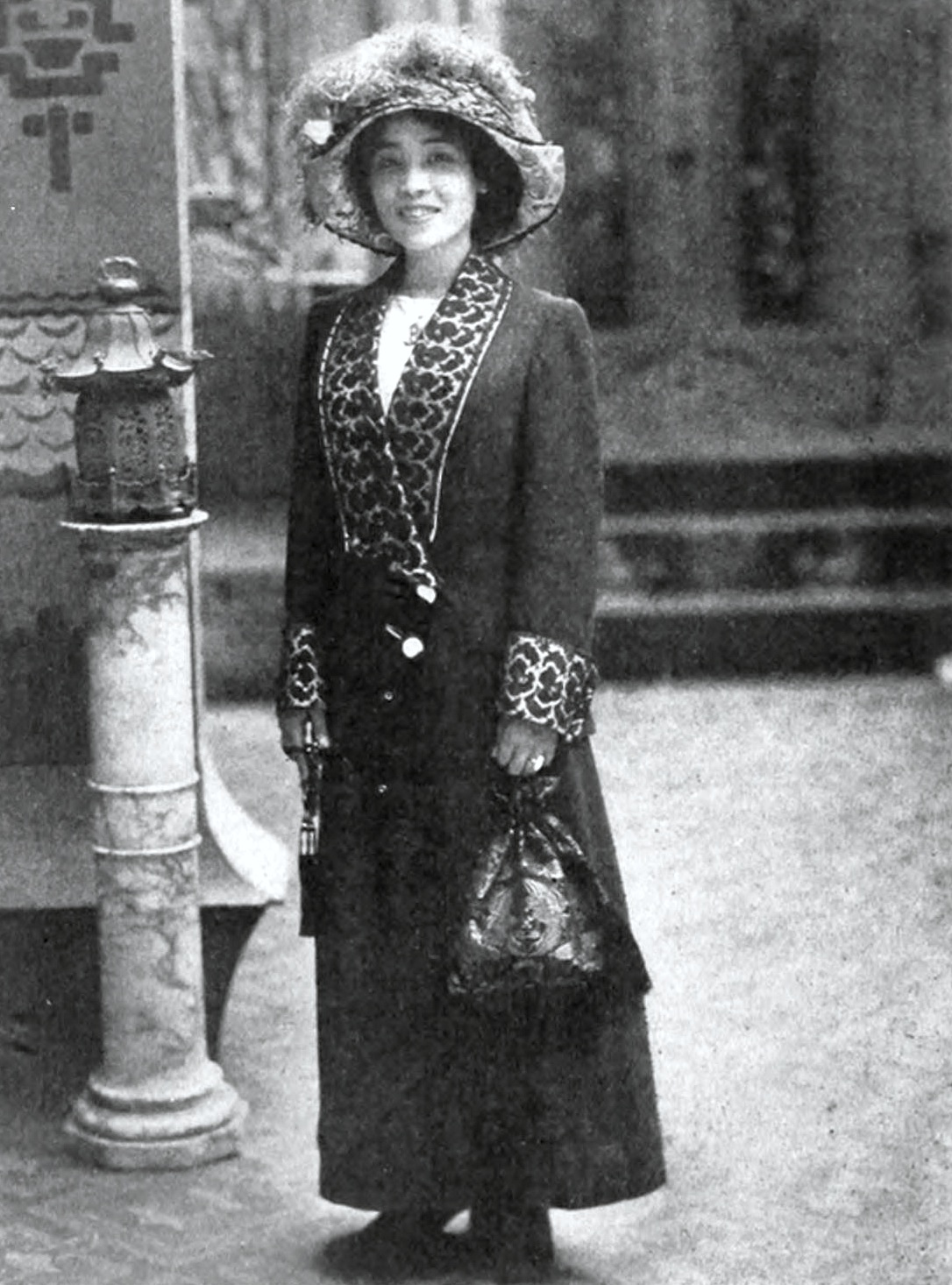
- Born: Tokuko Nagai 永井徳子; February 15, 1891; Misakichō, Tokyo, Empire of Japan
- Died: March 30, 1919 (aged 28); Kaho District, Fukuoka, Empire of Japan
- Other name: Taku Takagi
- Occupations: Actress, dancer
- Years active: 1911–1919
- Spouse(s): Chimpei Takagi

Tokuko Takagi (高木 徳子, Takagi Tokuko; born Tokuko Nagai (永井 徳子, Nagai Tokuko), February 15, 1891 – March 30, 1919), also billed as Taku Takagi, was a Japanese dancer and actress in early silent films. She was the first female Japanese performer to appear in a film professionally, appearing in four shorts for the American-based Thanhouser Company between the years 1911 and 1914. After returning to Japan, she was Japan's first dancer to dance in toe shoes.

== Biography ==
Tokuko Takagi was born in Misakichō in 1891, the daughter of a banker. In 1906, she married Chimpei Takagi, 24, when she was 15. They both moved to America, where she sang at the Manhattan Opera House in 1910.

She acted in four silent films for the Thanhouser Company: The East and the West (1911), Miss Taku of Tokyo (1912), For the Mikado (1912), and The Birth of the Lotus Blossom (1912). "Acting in motion pictures is such a fun, but it isn't as easy as it looks," she told a reporter in 1912. "They want me to play just like a Japanese girl the American imagines."

Takagi returned to Japan in 1914, due to the outbreak of World War I. In 1915, she had her Japanese domestic dance debut in the Imperial Theatre. While she was on tour in 1919, she suddenly died of a cerebral hemorrhage.

A biography of Takagi by Teruko Yoshitake was published in Japanese in 1985.
