= Tokuko Moriwake =

Japanese-American tennis player

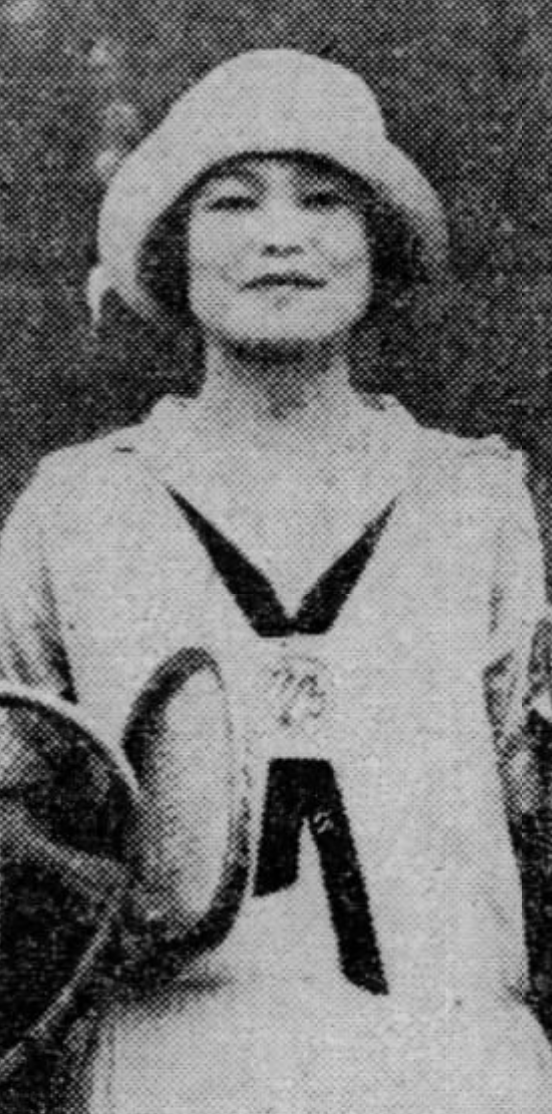
- Tokuko Moriwaki, from a 1924 newspaper
- Born: 1898; Kaua'i, Hawaii
- Died: 1948 (aged 49–50); Karuizawa, Japan
- Other names: Tokuko Moriwaki Nakano, Tokuko Nakano, Toku Moriwake, Moriwake Otoku
- Occupation: Tennis player

Otoku Moriwake Nakano (1898 – 1948), also known as Tokuko Moriwaki, was a Japanese-American tennis player in the 1920s and 1930s, the "first Japanese woman tennis player to participate in an American tournament."

== Early life and education ==
Moriwake was born and raised on Kaua'i, the daughter of Mangoro Moriwake and Suye Yamamoto Moriwake. Both of her parents were born in Japan. Her tennis coach in Honolulu was Michikiji Ogawa.

== Career ==
Moriwake worked at a real estate company as a young woman. She played tennis in Honolulu in 1924, and held the Hawaiian women's tennis championship in 1925, when she went to the North American mainland to compete in tournaments in British Columbia, Oregon, Washington, and California. In 1926 she and Mrs. Frank James won the Hawaii women's doubles championship again, and she was Hawaii's mixed doubles champion with Federico O. Biven. She was a national champion in Japan and the Hawaii women's champion in 1927 and 1928. She toured in Japan in 1927 and 1929, and wrote about her tour for Nippu Jiji, a Japanese newspaper in Honolulu. She was in charge of the Hawaiian women's championships in 1930, and was Hawaii champion again in 1933.

In 1936, using her married name, Tokuko Nakano, she was still Japan's and Hawaii's reigning women's singles tennis star, when she traveled to New York City to compete. She played in tournaments in Massachusetts, Pennsylvania, and New Jersey in 1937, in Maryland and New Jersey in 1938, and in New Jersey in 1939.

== Personal life ==
In 1934, Toku Moriwake married banker Fujio (or Fugio) Nakano. The Nakanos moved to Japan during World War II. Her brother Seiichi Moriwake, also born in Hawaii, was interned on Kauai during the war. In 1947, her stocks, bank accounts, and bonds were seized under the authority of the Trading with the Enemy Act, because, although she was born in Hawaii and held United States citizenship from birth, she was considered a Japanese citizen. She died in 1948, at the age of 50, in Karuizawa, Japan.
