= Lapham =

Lapham may refer to:

== People ==
- Bill Lapham (1934–2016), American football player
- Dave Lapham (born 1952), former player and current announcer for the NFL Cincinnati Bengals
- David Lapham (born 1970), cartoonist
- Elbridge G. Lapham (1814–1890), New York politician
- Increase A. Lapham (1811–1875), nineteenth century author and scientist
- Lewis H. Lapham (1935-2024), contemporary writer
- Nathan Lapham (1820–1890), New York politician
- Robert Lapham American guerrilla in the Philippines during WWII
- Roger Lapham (1883–1966), businessman and politician
- Seneca Lapham, a fictional character in the list of Cthulhu Mythos biographies
- Silas Lapham, the protagonist of William Dean Howells' novel The Rise of Silas Lapham
- Smith Lapham, an early settler of Rockford, Michigan

== Places ==
=== United States ===
- Lapham, former name of Stateline, California
- Lapham Peak Unit, Kettle Moraine State Forest, Wisconsin state park
- Lapham Memorial, public artwork on the University of Wisconsin–Milwaukee campus
- Lapham Mills, a hamlet northeast of Peru, New York
- Lapham Institute, from 1863 to 1876 the name of what is now the Smithville Seminary, a Free Will Baptist institution in Rhode Island
