= Senator Lapham (disambiguation) =

Elbridge G. Lapham (1814–1890) was a U.S. Senator from New York from 1881 to 1885. Senator Lapham may also refer to:

- Nathan Lapham (1820–1890), New York State Senate
- Oscar Lapham (1837–1926), Rhode Island State Senate
