= Senator Goss =

Senator Goss may refer to:

- Edward W. Goss (1893–1972), Connecticut State Senate
- Ephraim Goss (1806–1877), New York State Senate
- Steve Goss (1949–2015), North Carolina Senate
