= Donald Shaw =

Donald Shaw may refer to:

- Donald Lewis Shaw (1936–2021), American social scientist and co-founder of agenda-setting theory
- Donald Douglas Shaw (1834–1859), American politician
- Donald Shaw (academic) (1930–2017), professor and critic of Latin American literature
- Donald Shaw (rower) (born 1939), British Olympic rower
- Donald Shaw (musician) (born 1967), keyboard and accordion player for Capercaillie, a Scottish folk music group
- Don Shaw (baseball) (born 1944), American baseball player
- Don Shaw (screenwriter) (born 1934), British writer for film and television
- Don Shaw (volleyball) (born 1951), American volleyball coach
