= Andrew Warner =

Andrew Warner may refer to:

- Scoot Andrews (born 1971), American professional wrestler
- Andrew Jackson Warner (1833–1910), architect in Rochester, New York
- Andrew S. Warner (1819–1887), American politician from New York
