= 15th New York Engineer Regiment =

- Active: August 26 – September 20, 1861 (as 15th Infantry); October 25, 1861 – July 2, 1865
- Country: United States
- Allegiance: United States of America; Union
- Branch: Engineers
- Size: 777, (Note: As reported back to Adjutant General Hillhouse upon departure from New York on June 17, 1861) 720, (Note: As reported back to Adjutant General Hillhouse, on December 31, 1862) 770 (Note: As reported back to Adjutant General Sprague, on December 31, 1863)
- Nickname: New York Sappers And Miners
- Equipment: Model 1842 Springfield Muskets (.69 caliber, smooth), Enfield Rifled Muskets, (.577 caliber, rifled) (Note: As seen in survey before Chancellorsville.)
- Engagements: Siege of Yorktown; Seven Days Battles; Battle of Malvern Hill; Battle of Fredericksburg; Pollock's Mill Creek; Battle of Chancellorsville; Second Battle of Fredericksburg; Bank's Ford; Battle of Deep Run; Battle of Gettysburg; Mine Run Campaign; Second Battle of Petersburg; Battle of Fort Fisher; Campaign in the Carolinas; Fall of Petersburg; Battle of Appomattox Court House

Commanders
- Colonel: John McLeod Murphy
- Colonel: Clinton G. Colgate
- [Colonel: Wesley Brainard

Insignia
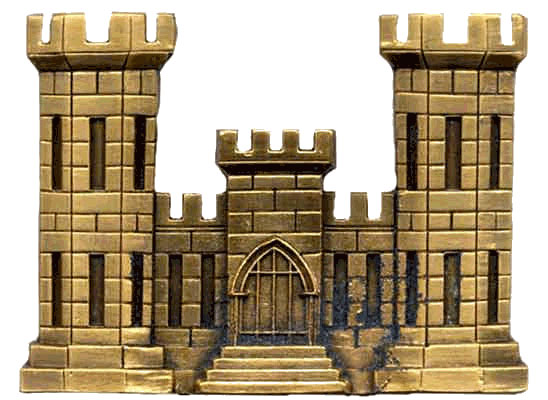
- Volunteer Engineer Brigade

The 15th New York Engineer Regiment was an engineer regiment that served in the Union Army during the American Civil War. The regiment was initially raised as the 15th Volunteer Infantry, but was converted to an engineer regiment after it arrived in Washington DC. It served as an engineer unit for the Army of the Potomac (AoP) from the Peninsula campaign through the Appomattox Campaign.

== Organization and muster ==
The regiment was accepted by the State May 9, 1861, and designated the 15th Regiment of Infantry. It was organized in New York city, and there mustered in the service of the United States for two years June 17, 1861. The regiment was intended and recruited for an engineer regiment and was converted to that arm of the service by the War Department on October 25, 1861.

In January 1862, Company I was reorganized among the three-year's recruits. June 18, 1863, the three years' men in the regiment were transferred to Companies A, B and C, and June 25, 1863, the two years' men of these three companies and all the other companies, their term of service having expired, were, commanded by Col. Clinton G. Colgate, honorably discharged, and mustered out at New York city. To the battalion left in the field, there was assigned as Company D the company enlisted for the 2nd Volunteer Engineers, on the 9th of October 1863, and in March 1864, another company recruited for the regiment joined it as Company E. In November 1864, the reorganization of the regiment was completed by the addition of seven companies as F, G, H, I, K, L and M; Companies H, I and K were formed of recruits originally enlisted for the 50th Engineers; Company M was originally organized for the 175th Infantry, and Company L had originally been organized as a company of the 189th Infantry. The new companies were mustered in the United States service, D and E for three years; F and L for one and three years, and G, H, I, K and M for one year. The companies were recruited principally from:

- First organization:
  - A, E, and F, also G — New York Light Infantry —New York city
  - B and C —Brooklyn
  - D— New York city, Brooklyn, and New Jersey
  - H —New York city, Brooklyn, Flushing, and Williamsburgh
  - I and K —New York city and Brooklyn
  - Second Company I —New York city
- Second organization:
  - D — New York city
  - E — Kingston
  - F — Albany, Kingston, Caneadea, Tarrytown, and Salina
  - G — Malone, Clymer, Harmony, Hector, Union, Newark Valley, Dansville, Lindley, Portville, French Creek, Owego, Lodi, and Seneca
  - H — Malone, Syracuse, Owego, Elmira, Auburn, and Dunkirk;
  - I — Elmira, Owego, Avon, Oswego, Utica, and Seneca
  - K — Lima, Goshen, Avon, Cicero, and Syracuse
  - L — Utica, Avon, Auburn, Syracuse, Lyons, Goshen, and Elmira
  - M — Syracuse, Auburn, Rochester, Owego, and Elmira

In 1860 the Army Corps of Engineers consisted of just 44 officers and 100 soldiers for an army of 15,000 soldiers. After the formation of the Confederacy and the Battle of Fort Sumter, Congress authorized a massive increase in the number of specialized engineer troops on August 3, 1861, to complement the growing Union Army. On October 25, 1861, in Virginia, the regiment was converted into and designated the 15th, Regiment of Engineers.

== Service ==
The 15th infantry, which subsequently became the 15th regiment of engineers, known as the New York sappers and miners, was organized in New York City, and mustered into the U. S. service at Willett's Point, New York harbor, June 17, 1861, for two years. It left for Washington on June 29, and encamped there until late in July, when it was assigned to McCunn's brigade. It was on picket and guard duty in the vicinity of Fairfax seminary until August, when it was transferred to Franklin's brigade. In September it transferred to Newton's brigade, and in November the original purpose of the organization was carried out and it was ordered to Alexandria to receive instruction in engineering.

Here the regiment remained until March 19, 1862, at which time it was ordered to Fairfax seminary in the I corps under Gen. McDowell. It participated in the siege duties before Yorktown, rendering effective service in bridge building, road building, fortifications, and other engineering duties.

After the close of the campaign on the Peninsula, the 15th encamped at Harrison's landing and was then returned to Washington, joining the Army of the Potomac in the field November 17, 1862.

Work on the bridges by which the army crossed to Fredericksburg was next undertaken. In January 1863, ensued the "Mud March," when the men were engaged in the construction of roads. The remainder of the winter of 1862–63 was passed in camp at Falmouth, and during the Chancellorsville campaign the engineering brigade, of which the 15th formed a part, was instrumental in building bridges. The regiment remained with this branch of the service until the middle of June, when the two years' men returned home and were mustered out at New York city, June 25, 1863. The remainder of the regiment was consolidated into a battalion of three companies, to which was added in October a company recruited for the 2nd N. Y. engineers and another company in March 1864. Seven additional companies were added in November 1864, by means of which the regimental organization was completed, and it remained in service as a veteran regiment until the close of the war. With the volunteer engineer brigade of the Army of the Potomac, it was present at Gettysburg, then joined in the southward movement of the army, shared in the Mine Run Campaign, and went into winter quarters near Brandy Station, VA.

Until January 1865, the 15th was engaged in siege duties before Petersburg, when three companies were detached and sent to North Carolina under Gen. Terry, where they were present at the fall of Fort Fisher, and in March, 1865, were sent to join the Army of the Ohio. The remainder of the regiment remained at Petersburg until the final surrender, engaged in trench digging, mining, and other services incident to the siege. This portion of the regiment was mustered out at Washington June 13 and 14. 1865, and the other three companies on July 2.

== Affiliations, battle honors, detailed service, and casualties ==
=== Organizational affiliation ===
Attached to:

- McCune's Brigade July 30 to August 4, 1861.
- Franklin's Brigade, Division of the Potomac, to September 26,
- Newton's Brigade to November, 1861
- Engineer Brigade, AoP, to June, 1865.

=== List of battles ===
The official list of battles in which the regiment bore a part:

- Siege of Yorktown
- Seven Days Battles
- Battle of Malvern Hill
- Battle of Fredericksburg
- Pollock's Mill Creek
- Battle of Chancellorsville
- Second Battle of Fredericksburg
- Bank's Ford
- Battle of Deep Run
- Battle of Gettysburg
- Mine Run Campaign
- Second Battle of Petersburg
- Battle of Fort Fisher
- Campaign in the Carolinas
- Battle of Wyse Fork
- Battle of Bennett House
- Fall of Petersburg
- Battle of Appomattox Court House

=== Detailed service ===
==== 1861 ====
- Left New York for Washington, D.C., June 17, 1861
- Duty at Alexandria, Va., until October
- Converted by special orders from the war department on October 25, 1861, into a regiment of engineers and ordered to Washington, where instruction was received.
- Duty at Washington, D.C., until March 18, 1862

==== 1862 ====
- Moved to the Virginia Peninsula March Siege of Yorktown April 5 – May 4.
- Advance up the Peninsula and constructing bridges on the Chickahominy River May
- Seven days before Richmond June 25 – July 1.
- Seven Pines June 27.
- White Oak Swamp and Charles City Cross Roads June 30. Malvern Hill July 1.
- At Harrison's Landing till August 16.
- Moved to Washington, D. c., August 16·22.
- Maryland Campaign September–October.
- Rappahannock Campaign November 1862, to June 1863.
- Battle of Fredericksburg, Va., December 12–15.

==== 1863 ====
- "Mud March" January 20–24, 1863.
- Chancellorsville Campaign April 27 – May 6.
  - Operations at Franklin's Crossing April 29 – May 2.
  - Maryes Heights, Fredericksburg, May 3.
  - Salem Heights May 3–4.
  - Banks' Ford May 4.
- Operations at Deep Run Ravine June 5 13.

Mustered out June 25, 1863. Three years men consolidated to a Battalion of three Companies, "A," "B" and "C." Company "D" assigned December 9, 1863; Company "E" assigned March 1864, and other seven Companies November 1864.

- Gettysburg (Pa.) Campaign June–July 1863.
- Battle of Gettysburg July 1–3.
- Battle of Gettysburg July 1–4.
- Bristoe Campaign October 9–22.
- Bristoe Station October 14.
- Advance to line of the Rappahannock November 7–8.
- Mine Run Campaign November 26 – December 2.

==== 1864 ====
- Rapidan Campaign May–June 1864.
- Battles of the Wilderness May 5–7;
- Spottsylvania Court House May 8–21;
- North Anna River May 23–26.
- On the line of the Pamunkey May 26–28.
- Totopotomoy May 28–31.
- Cold Harbor June 1–12.
- Crossing of James River June 15.
- Before Petersburg June 16–18.
- Siege operations against Petersburg and Richmond June 16, 1864, to April 2, 1865.
- Deep Bottom July 27–28, 1864.

==== 1865 ====
- Hatcher's Run February 5–7, 1865.
- Appomattox Campaign March 28 – April 9.
- Fall of Petersburg and Richmond April 2–3.
- Pursuit of Lee April 3–9.
- Appomattox Court House April 9.
- Surrender of Lee and his army.
- Expedition to reinforce General Sherman April 23–29.
- Moved to Washington, D. C., May 2–15.
- Grand Review May 23.
- Cos. "A," "B" and "H" with Terry's Expedition to Fort Fisher, N. C., January 3–15, 1865.
- Capture of Fort Fisher January 15.
- Capture of Wilmington, N. C., February 22.
- Campaign of the Carolinas March 1 April 26.
- Occupation of Goldsboro and Raleigh.
- Bennett's House April 26.
- Surrender of Johnston and his army.
- Duty in Dept. of North Carolina till June.
- Mustered out Companies "E-" "F" "G" "H" "I" "K, L" and "M" at Washington D.C., June 1865
- Company "C" June 14, 1865,
- Companies "A," "B" and "D" July 2, 1865.

== Casualties ==
Regiment lost during service 7 Enlisted men killed and mortally wounded and 3 Officers and 119 Enlisted men by disease. Total 129.

== Armament ==
Since the men of the 15th were specialists, they were not given first-tier weapons. They were armed with 872 Model 1822 Muskets. By the first quarter of 1863, after an effort to get most of the companies to be armed with the same weapon to make supply easier, the regiment reported the following survey:

- A – 119 British Pattern 1853 rifles. (Note: These were the standard rifle for the British army having performed well in the Crimean War. The Enfield was a .577 calibre Minié-type muzzle-loading rifled musket. It was used by both armies and was the second most widely used infantry weapon in the Union forces.) (.58 and .577 Cal)
- B – 113 British Pattern 1853 rifles, (.58 and .577 Cal)
- C – 86 British Pattern 1853 rifles, (.58 and .577 Cal)
- D – 64 British Pattern 1853 rifles, (.58 and .577 Cal)
- E – 121 British Pattern 1853 rifles, (.58 and .577 Cal)
- F – 82 British Pattern 1853 rifles, (.58 and .577 Cal)
- G – 67 British Pattern 1853 rifles, (.58 and .577 Cal)
- H – 72 British Pattern 1853 rifles, (.58 and .577 Cal)
- I – 86 British Pattern 1853 rifles, (.58 and .577 Cal)
- K – 59 Springfield Model 1855, 1861, National Armory (NA) (Note: In government records, National Armory refers to one of three United States Armory and Arsenals, the Springfield Armory, the Harpers Ferry Armory, and the Rock Island Arsenal. Rifle-muskets, muskets, and rifles were manufactured in Springfield and Harper's Ferry before the war. When the Rebels destroyed the Harpers Ferry Armory early in the American Civil War and stole the machinery for the Confederate central government-run Richmond Armory, the Springfield Armory was briefly the only government manufacturer of arms, until the Rock Island Arsenal was established in 1862. During this time production ramped up to unprecedented levels ever seen in American manufacturing up until that time, with only 9,601 rifles manufactured in 1860, rising to a peak of 276,200 by 1864. These advancements would not only give the Union a decisive technological advantage over the Confederacy during the war but served as a precursor to the mass production manufacturing that contributed to the post-war Second Industrial Revolution and 20th century machine manufacturing capabilities. American historian Merritt Roe Smith has drawn comparisons between the early assembly machining of the Springfield rifles and the later production of the Ford Model T, with the latter having considerably more parts, but producing a similar numbers of units in the earliest years of the 1913–1915 automobile assembly line, indirectly due to mass production manufacturing advancements pioneered by the armory 50 years earlier.)

A year later, after the departure of the two-year enlistees, the regiment reported the following for the first quarter of 1864: (Note: The large size of the regiments companies at this time were a result of the consolidation of the veterans into the four companies.)

- A – 108 British Pattern 1853 rifles, (.58 and .577 Cal)
- B – 90 British Pattern 1853 rifles, (.58 and .577 Cal)
- C – 121 British Pattern 1853 rifles, (.58 and .577 Cal)
- D – 136 British Pattern 1853 rifles, (.58 and .577 Cal)

At the end of 1864, then at a strength of twelve companies, the regiment reported the following for the first quarter of 1864:

- A – 128 British Pattern 1853 rifles, (.58 and .577 Cal)
- B – 129 British Pattern 1853 rifles, (.58 and .577 Cal); 5 Pattern 1856 Enfield, sabre bayonet, (.58 and .577 Cal.)
- C – 114 British Pattern 1853 rifles, (.58 and .577 Cal)
- D – 129 British Pattern 1853 rifles, (.58 and .577 Cal)
- E – 143 British Pattern 1853 rifles, (.58 and .577 Cal)
- F – 135 Springfield Model 1861, National Armory (NA)
- G – 150 Light French Liege M1853 rifles, (Note: The 1853 Liege was a two-band fifle similar to the Model 1856 Enfield.) sabre bayonet (.577 Cal.) sabre bayonet (.577 Cal.)
- H – 149 Light French Liege M1853 rifles, sabre bayonet (.577 Cal.)
- I – 5 Light French Liege M1853 rifles, sabre bayonet (.577 Cal.); 1406 British Pattern 1853 rifles, (.58 and .577 Cal)
- K – 150 Light French Liege M1853 rifles, sabre bayonet (.577 Cal.)
- L – 138 British Pattern 1853 rifles, (.58 and .577 Cal)
- M – 150 Light French Liege M1853 rifles, sabre bayonet (.577 Cal.)

=== Rifle-muskets ===
Issued weapons

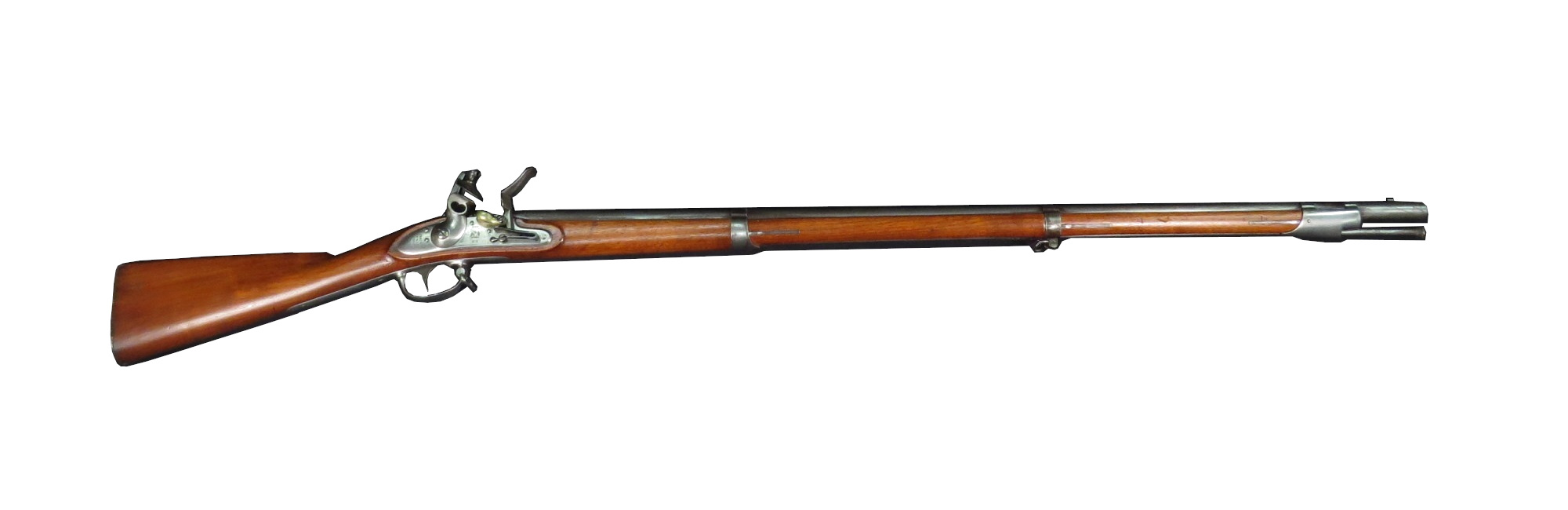
Model 1822 Flintlock smoothbore musket

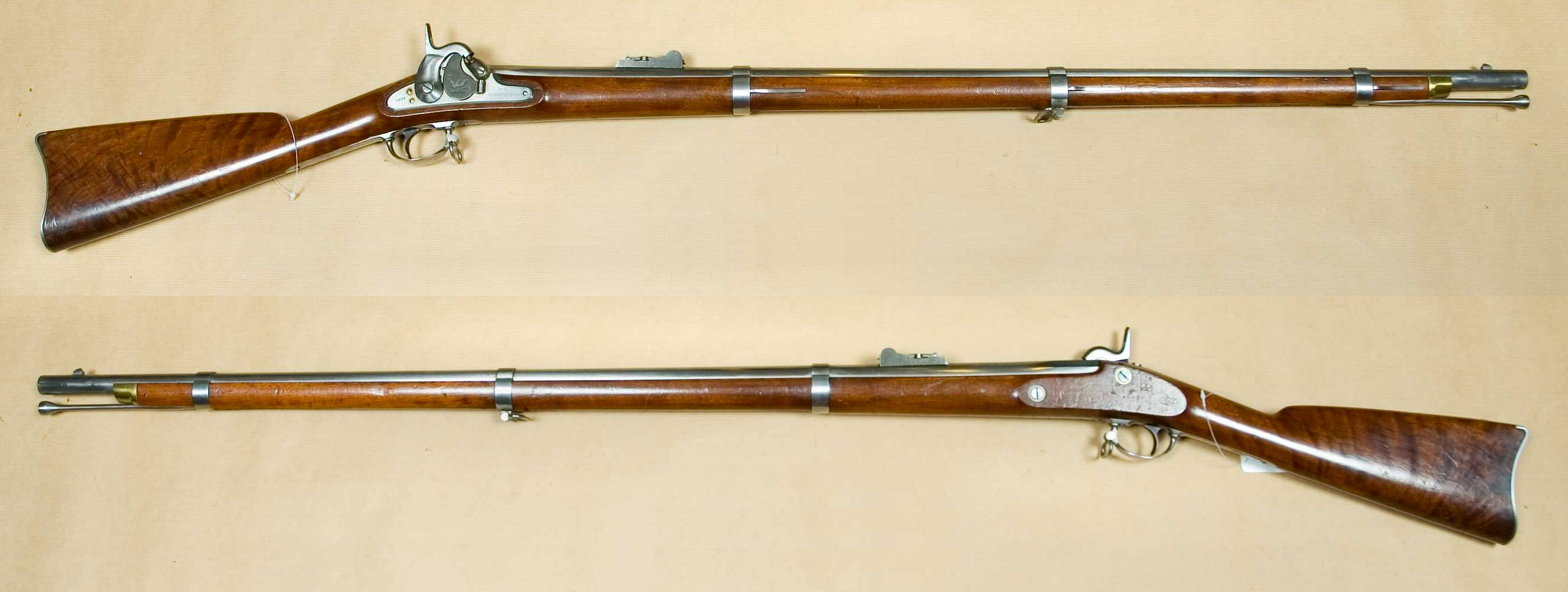
Springfield Model 1855

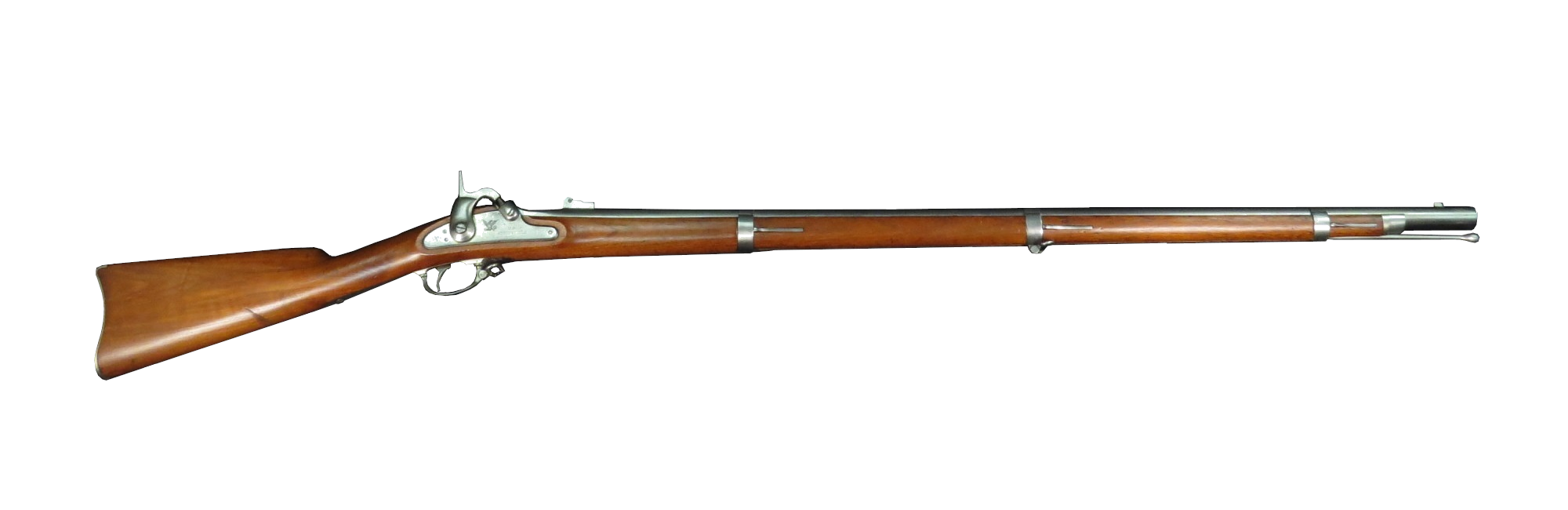
Springfield Model 1861

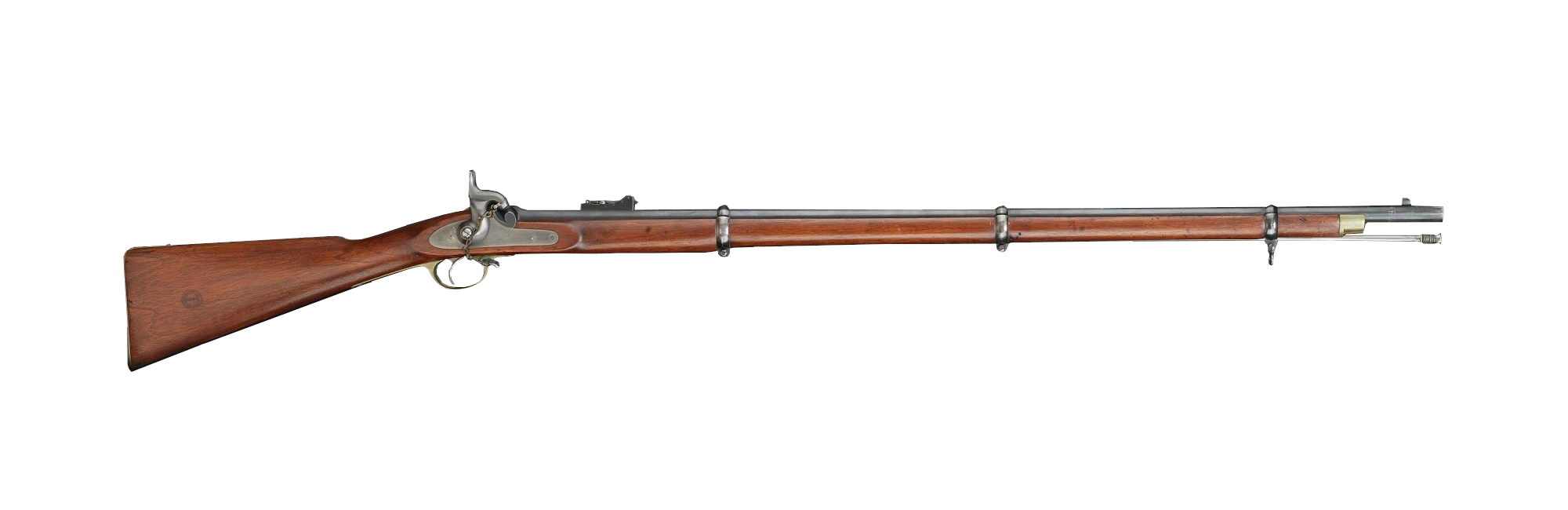
Pattern 1853 Enfield rifle-musket

== Regimental staff ==
- Colonels – John McLeod Murphy, Clinton G. Colgate, Wesley Brainard
- Lieutenant Colonels – Richard J. Dodge, Francis B. O'Keefe, Clinton G. Colgate, James A. Magruder, William A. Ketchum, Stephen Chester
- Majors – Francis B. O'Keefe. Clinton G. Colgate, John A. Magruder, Walter L. Cassin, William A. Ketchum, Edward C. Perry, Sewall Sergeant, Henry V. Slosson, William Henderson, Timothy Lubey, Thomas Bogan.

== See also ==
- List of New York Civil War regiments
- New York in the Civil War
