= 83rd New York State Legislature =

New York state legislative session

←	82nd	84th	→
- The Old State Capitol (1879)

Overview
- Legislative body: New York State Legislature
- Jurisdiction: New York, United States
- Term: January 1 – December 31, 1860

Senate
- Members: 32
- President: Lt. Gov. Robert Campbell (R)
- Temporary President: Nathan Lapham (R), from January 25
- Party control: Republican (23-9)

Assembly
- Members: 128
- Speaker: DeWitt C. Littlejohn (R)
- Party control: Republican (91-37)

Sessions
- 1st: January 3 – April 17, 1860

The 83rd New York State Legislature, consisting of the New York State Senate and the New York State Assembly, met from January 3 to April 17, 1860, during the second year of Edwin D. Morgan's governorship, in Albany.

== Background ==
Under the provisions of the New York Constitution of 1846, 32 Senators and 128 assemblymen were elected in single-seat districts; senators for a two-year term, assemblymen for a one-year term. The senatorial districts were made up of entire counties, except New York County (four districts) and Kings County (two districts). The Assembly districts were made up of entire towns, or city wards, forming a contiguous area, all within the same county.

At this time there were two major political parties: the Democratic Party and the Republican Party. The Know Nothings, or "American Party," endorsed either Republican or Democratic nominees.

== Elections ==
The 1859 New York state election was held on November 8. The nine statewide elective offices were carried by six Republicans and three Democrats. The approximate party strength at this election, as gathered from the vote for State officers was: Republican 251,000; Democratic 227,000; and American 25,000. The Americans did not nominate own candidates, but endorsed five Republicans and four Democrats on their State ticket. This led to easy elections of the endorsed Republicans, but very tight races for the endorsed Democrats, three of whom were elected by very slim majorities.

== Sessions ==
The Legislature met for the regular session at the Old State Capitol in Albany on January 3, 1860; and adjourned on April 17.

DeWitt C. Littlejohn (R) was re-elected Speaker with 89 votes against 30 for Theophilus C. Callicot (D).

On January 25, Nathan Lapham (R) was elected president pro tempore of the State Senate.

== State Senate ==
=== Districts ===
- 1st District: Queens, Richmond and Suffolk counties
- 2nd District: 1st, 2nd, 3rd, 4th, 5th, 7th, 11th, 13th and 19th wards of the City of Brooklyn
- 3rd District: 6th, 8th, 9th, 10th, 12th, 14th, 15th, 16th, 17th and 18th wards of the City of Brookland; and all towns in Kings County
- 4th District: 1st, 2nd, 3rd, 4th, 5th, 6th, 7th, 8th and 14th wards of New York City
- 5th District: 10th, 11th, 13th and 17th wards of New York City
- 6th District: 9th, 15th, 16th and 18th wards of New York City
- 7th District: 12th, 19th, 20th, 21st and 22nd wards of New York City
- 8th District: Putnam, Rockland and Westchester counties
- 9th District: Orange and Sullivan counties
- 10th District: Greene and Ulster counties
- 11th District: Columbia and Dutchess counties
- 12th District: Rensselaer and Washington counties
- 13th District: Albany County
- 14th District: Delaware, Schenectady and Schoharie counties
- 15th District: Fulton, Hamilton, Montgomery and Saratoga counties
- 16th District: Clinton, Essex and Warren counties
- 17th District: Franklin and St. Lawrence counties
- 18th District: Jefferson and Lewis counties
- 19th District: Oneida County
- 20th District: Herkimer and Otsego counties
- 21st District: Oswego County
- 22nd District: Onondaga County
- 23rd District: Chenango, Cortland and Madison counties
- 24th District: Broome, Tompkins and Tioga counties
- 25th District: Cayuga and Wayne counties
- 26th District: Ontario, Seneca and Yates counties
- 27th District: Chemung, Schuyler and Steuben counties
- 28th District: Monroe County
- 29th District: Genesee, Niagara and Orleans counties
- 30th District: Allegany, Livingston and Wyoming counties
- 31st District: Erie County
- 32nd District: Cattaraugus and Chautauqua counties
Note: There are now 62 counties in the State of New York. The counties which are not mentioned in this list had not yet been established, or sufficiently organized, the area being included in one or more of the abovementioned counties.

=== Members ===
The asterisk (*) denotes members of the previous Legislature who continued in office as members of this Legislature. Francis B. Spinola, Lyman Truman, Alexander B. Williams and Erastus S. Prosser were re-elected. Edward A. Lawrence and Thomas A. Gardiner changed from the Assembly to the Senate.

Party affiliations follow the vote on Senate officers.

District	Senator	Party	Notes
1st	Edward A. Lawrence*	Democrat	
2nd	Thomas A. Gardiner*	Democrat	
3rd	Francis B. Spinola*	Democrat	
4th	John McLeod Murphy	Democrat	
5th	Bernard Kelly	Democrat	
6th	Benjamin F. Manierre	Republican	
7th	Richard B. Connolly	Democrat	
8th	Hezekiah D. Robertson	Republican	
9th	Robert Y. Grant	Democrat	
10th	Joshua Fiero Jr.	Republican	
11th	John H. Ketcham	Republican	
12th	Volney Richmond	Republican	
13th	Andrew J. Colvin	Democrat	
14th	Joseph H. Ramsey	Republican	
15th	Isaiah Blood	Democrat	
16th	Nathan Lapham	Republican	on January 25, elected president pro tempore
17th	Charles C. Montgomery	Republican	
18th	James A. Bell	Republican	
19th	William H. Ferry	Republican	
20th	Francis M. Rotch	Republican	
21st	Andrew S. Warner	Republican	
22nd	Allen Munroe	Republican	
23rd	Perrin H. McGraw	Republican	
24th	Lyman Truman*	Republican	
25th	Alexander B. Williams*	Republican	
26th	Thomas Hillhouse	Republican	
27th	Samuel H. Hammond	Republican	
28th	Ephraim Goss	Republican	
29th	Peter P. Murphy	Republican	
30th	David H. Abell	Republican	
31st	Erastus S. Prosser*	Republican	
32nd	Walter L. Sessions	Republican	

=== Employees ===
- Clerk: James Terwilliger
- Deputy Clerk: Loren B. Sessions
- Sergeant-at-Arms: James C. Clark
- Assistant Sergeant-at-Arms: George H. Knapp
- Doorkeeper: Peter Kilmer
- First Assistant Doorkeeper: Charles Johnson
- Second Assistant Doorkeeper: John H. France
- Third Assistant Doorkeeper: Caspar Walter

== State Assembly ==
=== Assemblymen ===
The asterisk (*) denotes members of the previous Legislature who continued as members of this Legislature.

Party affiliations follow the vote for Speaker.

District		Assemblymen	Party	Notes
Albany	1st	John I. Slingerland	Republican	
Albany	2nd	Stephen Merselis Jr.	Republican	
Albany	3rd	Samuel W. Gibbs	Democrat	
Albany	4th	Lorenzo D. Collins*	Republican	
Allegany	1st	William M. Smith	Republican	
Allegany	2nd	Darwin E. Maxson	Republican	
Broome		Henry Mather	Republican	
Cattaraugus	1st	Ulysses P. Crane	Republican	
Cattaraugus	2nd	James M. Smith	Republican	
Cayuga	1st	William W. Payne*	Republican	
Cayuga	2nd	Allen D. Morgan	Republican	
Chautauqua	1st	Ebenezer G. Cook	Republican	
Chautauqua	2nd	Hiram Smith 2d	Republican	
Chemung		Lucius Robinson	Republican	
Chenango	1st	Samuel L. Beebe	Republican	
Chenango	2nd	Joseph Bush	Republican	
Clinton		Henry McFadden	Republican	
Columbia	1st	Peter McArthur	Republican	
Columbia	2nd	P. Edward Van Alstyne	Republican	
Cortland		John A. McVean	Republican	
Delaware	1st	vacant		Assemblyman-elect Donald Douglas Shaw died on December 29, 1859
Delaware	1st	Barna R. Johnson	Republican	elected to fill vacancy; seated on February 15
Delaware	2nd	Samuel A. Law*	Republican	
Dutchess	1st	Abiah W. Palmer	Republican	
Dutchess	2nd	Richard J. Garretson	Democrat	
Erie	1st	Orlando Allen	Republican	
Erie	2nd	Henry B. Miller*	Republican	
Erie	3rd	Hiram Newell	Republican	
Erie	4th	Joseph H. Plumb	Republican	
Essex		Martin Finch	Republican	
Franklin		Wells S. Dickinson	Republican	
Fulton and Hamilton		James Kennedy	Democrat	
Genesee		Elbridge G. Moulton*	Republican	
Greene		Gerry Coonley	Democrat	
Herkimer	1st	Stephen R. Millington	Republican	
Herkimer	2nd	Irving Holcomb	Republican	
Jefferson	1st	Bernard D. Searles	Republican	
Jefferson	2nd	William W. Taggart	Republican	
Jefferson	3rd	Moses C. Jewett	Republican	
Kings	1st	Andrew A. Myers	Democrat	
Kings	2nd	Charles Kelsey	Democrat	
Kings	3rd	Theophilus C. Callicot	Democrat	
Kings	4th	James Darcy	Democrat	
Kings	5th	William C. Jones	Democrat	
Kings	6th	Charles M. Briggs	Republican	
Kings	7th	George H. Fisher	Republican	
Lewis		Richardson T. Hough	Republican	
Livingston	1st	Samuel L. Fuller*	Republican	
Livingston	2nd	John Wiley*	Republican	
Madison	1st	David Clark	Republican	
Madison	2nd	James Barnett	Republican	
Monroe	1st	Thomas J. Jeffords	Republican	
Monroe	2nd	Elias Pond*	Republican	
Monroe	3rd	Alphonso Perry*	Republican	
Montgomery		Jay D. Bowman	Am./Dem.	
New York	1st	William Burns	Democrat	
New York	2nd	William Walsh	Democrat	
New York	3rd	Christian B. Woodruff*	Democrat	
New York	4th	William Gover*	Democrat	
New York	5th	William L. Coles	Democrat	
New York	6th	Samuel T. Webster	Democrat	
New York	7th	Frederick A. Conkling*	Republican	on November 6, 1860, elected to the 37th U.S. Congress
New York	8th	Thomas O'Rourke	Democrat	
New York	9th	David R. Jaques	Republican	
New York	10th	Joseph P. Cooper	Republican	
New York	11th	Cummings H. Tucker	Republican	
New York	12th	Andrew Smith	Democrat	
New York	13th	Peter Masterson*	Democrat	
New York	14th	Theodore B. Voorhees	Democrat	
New York	15th	George W. Varian	Democrat	
New York	16th	Henry Arcularius	Democrat	
New York	17th	William Harris	Democrat	
Niagara	1st	Thomas T. Flagler	Republican	
Niagara	2nd	Burt Van Horn*	Republican	on November 6, 1860, elected to the 37th U.S. Congress
Oneida	1st	James McQuade	Republican	
Oneida	2nd	Benjamin Allen	Republican	
Oneida	3rd	Thomas Evans	Republican	
Oneida	4th	George Williams	Republican	
Onondaga	1st	Jeremiah Emerick	Republican	
Onondaga	2nd	Austin Myers	Republican	
Onondaga	3rd	Philetus Clark	Republican	
Ontario	1st	Lewis Peck	Republican	
Ontario	2nd	Shotwell Powell*	Republican	
Orange	1st	Peter C. Regan	Democrat	
Orange	2nd	Harvey R. Cadwell	Democrat	
Orleans		Abel Stilson	Republican	
Oswego	1st	DeWitt C. Littlejohn*	Republican	re-elected Speaker
Oswego	2nd	William H. Carter	Republican	
Oswego	3rd	Robert S. Kelsey	Republican	
Otsego	1st	Ezra S. Whipple	Republican	
Otsego	2nd	David B. St. John*	Republican	
Putnam		Edwin A. Pelton*	Republican	
Queens	1st	Stephen Taber	Democrat	
Queens	2nd	John Pettit	Democrat	
Rensselaer	1st	Thomas Coleman*	Republican	
Rensselaer	2nd	James A. Culver	Republican	
Rensselaer	3rd	Anson Bingham*	Republican	
Richmond		Theodore C. Vermilye	Democrat	
Rockland		Peter S. Yeury	Democrat	
St. Lawrence	1st	Charles Richardson	Republican	
St. Lawrence	2nd	Edwin A. Merritt	Republican	
St. Lawrence	3rd	Clark S. Chittenden	Republican	
Saratoga	1st	John Fulton	Democrat	
Saratoga	2nd	Judiah Ellsworth	Republican	
Schenectady		Peter Dorsch	Republican	
Schoharie		John W. Couchman	Democrat	
Schuyler		Edwin H. Downs	Republican	
Seneca		John C. Hall	Democrat	
Steuben	1st	Daniel Gray	Republican	
Steuben	2nd	Wickham R. Crocker*	Republican	
Steuben	3rd	Lorenzo N. Rider	Republican	
Suffolk	1st	Philander R. Jennings	Republican	
Suffolk	2nd	Richard J. Cornelius*	Democrat	
Sullivan		Abram W. Decker	Democrat	
Tioga		David Earll*	Republican	
Tompkins		Jeremiah W. Dwight	Republican	
Ulster	1st	Humphrey Jewell	Republican	
Ulster	2nd	Jeremiah Clark	Democrat	
Ulster	3rd	John H. Kortright	Democrat	
Warren		Benjamin C. Butler	Republican	
Washington	1st	James Savage	Republican	
Washington	2nd	Pelatiah Jakway	Republican	
Wayne	1st	James M. Servis	Republican	
Wayne	2nd	Abel J. Bixby	Republican	
Westchester	1st	William T. B. Milliken	Republican	
Westchester	2nd	N. Holmes Odell	Democrat	
Westchester	3rd	Gaylord B. Hubbell*	Republican	
Wyoming		George G. Hoskins	Republican	
Yates		George R. Barden	Republican	

=== Employees ===
- Clerk: William Richardson
- Assistant Clerk: Luther Caldwell
- Sergeant-at-Arms: Eleazer A. Williams
- Doorkeeper: Joseph Ball
- First Assistant Doorkeeper: Charles L. Curtis
- Second Assistant Doorkeeper: Bradford Davis
- Journal Clerk: Cornelius S. Underwood
- Engrossing Clerk: Henry S. Crandall
- Senior Deputy Clerk: John A. Haddock

== Sources ==
- The New York Civil List compiled by Franklin Benjamin Hough, Stephen C. Hutchins and Edgar Albert Werner (1867; see pg. 439 for Senate districts; pg. 442 for senators; pg. 450–462 for Assembly districts; and pg. 489ff for assemblymen)
- Journal of the Senate (83rd Session) (1860)
- Journal of the Assembly (83rd Session) (1860)
