= Henry P. Hedges =

American politician

Henry Parsons Hedges (October 13, 1817 – September 26, 1911) was an American lawyer, politician, and judge from New York.

== Life ==
Hedges was born on October 13, 1817, in Wainscott, New York, the son of Zephaniah Hedges and Phebe P. Osborn. His grandfather was Deacon David Hedges.

Hedges entered the Clinton Academy in East Hampton when he was fourteen, studying there for three years. In 1835, he entered the sophomore class in Yale College, graduating from there in 1838. He studied in Yale Law School from 1839 to 1840. He spent the previous year at home. He then studied law with David L. Seymour of Troy, Judge George Miller of Riverhead, and J. C. Albertson of New York City. He was admitted to the bar in 1842. In the spring 1843, he went to Ohio and intended to settle there. He returned to Long Island that September and opened a law office in Sag Harbor, which he maintained until 1893. In 1854, he moved to Bridgehampton and opened a law office there as well. He was executor of many estates and owned a large farm and other valuable land. He also served as president of Sag Harbor Savings Bank from 1869 to 1899.

In 1851, Hedges was elected to the New York State Assembly as a Whig, representing the Suffolk County 1st District. He served in the Assembly in 1852. In 1856, he became one of the founders of the Republican Party and became. In 1861, he became district attorney of Suffolk County, an office he was re-elected to in 1864. In 1865, he was elected county judge, an office he held for four years. He was re-elected to the office in 1873 and held it for another six years. After his term as county judge and surrogate ended in 1880, he returned to his private practice, working mainly in executing large financial trusts and being president of the Sag Harbor Savings Bank.

Hedges was an authority on the history of eastern Long Island, where his ancestors lived since its first settlement. When he was eighty, he published "A History of the Town of East Hampton." He united with the Presbyterian Church in 1840, and he served as an elder in Sag Harbor or Bridgehampton from 1849 until his death. When he died, he was the oldest living Yale graduate and the last survivor of his class. In 1843, he married Gloriana Osborn. Their children were farmer Samuel O., lawyer Edwin, and Congregational minister William. Gloriana died in 1891, and in 1892 Hedges married Mary G. Hildreth.

Hedges died at home on September 26, 1911. He was buried in Bridgehampton Cemetery.

New York State Assembly
Preceded by Franklin Tuthill	New York State Assembly; Suffolk County, 1st District; 1852	Succeeded by Abraham H. Gardiner
