= 85th New York State Legislature =

New York state legislative session

←	84th	86th	→
- The Old State Capitol (1879)

Overview
- Legislative body: New York State Legislature
- Jurisdiction: New York, United States
- Term: January 1 – December 31, 1862

Senate
- Members: 32
- President: Lt. Gov. Robert Campbell (R)
- Temporary President: James A. Bell (U), from February 11
- Party control: Union (25-7)

Assembly
- Members: 128
- Speaker: Henry J. Raymond (U)
- Party control: Union (90-38)

Sessions
- 1st: January 7 – April 23, 1862

The 85th New York State Legislature, consisting of the New York State Senate and the New York State Assembly, met from January 7 to April 23, 1862, during the fourth year of Edwin D. Morgan's governorship, in Albany.

== Background ==
Under the provisions of the New York Constitution of 1846, 32 Senators and 128 assemblymen were elected in single-seat districts; senators for a two-year term, assemblymen for a one-year term. The senatorial districts were made up of entire counties, except New York County (four districts) and Kings County (two districts). The Assembly districts were made up of entire towns, or city wards, forming a contiguous area, all within the same county.

At this time there were two major political parties: the Republican Party and the Democratic Party. The Democrats split over the civil war issue. The War Democrats nominated an "Independent People's" ticket which was almost completely endorsed by the Republicans, and became known as the Union ticket; the rump Democratic Party, favoring a compromise with the South and later known as Copperheads, nominated an opposing ticket. In New York City the Democrats were split into two factions: Tammany Hall and Mozart Hall.

== Elections ==
The 1861 New York state election was held on November 5. Of the nine statewide elective offices up for election, eight were carried by Union men, and one by a Democrat. The approximate party strength at this election, as gathered from the vote for Secretary of State and the short-term Canal Commissioner was: Democrats 190,000; Republicans 180,000; and War Democrats 117,000.

== Sessions ==
The Legislature met for the regular session at the Old State Capitol in Albany on January 7, 1862; and adjourned on April 23.

Henry J. Raymond (U) was elected again Speaker with 88 votes against 36 for Horatio Seymour (D).

On January 30, the Legislature elected Victor M. Rice to succeed Henry H. Van Dyck as Superintendent of Public Instruction.

On February 11, James A. Bell was elected president pro tempore of the State Senate.

== State Senate ==
=== Districts ===
- 1st District: Queens, Richmond and Suffolk counties
- 2nd District: 1st, 2nd, 3rd, 4th, 5th, 7th, 11th, 13th and 19th wards of the City of Brooklyn
- 3rd District: 6th, 8th, 9th, 10th, 12th, 14th, 15th, 16th, 17th and 18th wards of the City of Brooklyn; and all towns in Kings County
- 4th District: 1st, 2nd, 3rd, 4th, 5th, 6th, 7th, 8th and 14th wards of New York City
- 5th District: 10th, 11th, 13th and 17th wards of New York City
- 6th District: 9th, 15th, 16th and 18th wards of New York City
- 7th District: 12th, 19th, 20th, 21st and 22nd wards of New York City
- 8th District: Putnam, Rockland and Westchester counties
- 9th District: Orange and Sullivan counties
- 10th District: Greene and Ulster counties
- 11th District: Columbia and Dutchess counties
- 12th District: Rensselaer and Washington counties
- 13th District: Albany County
- 14th District: Delaware, Schenectady and Schoharie counties
- 15th District: Fulton, Hamilton, Montgomery and Saratoga counties
- 16th District: Clinton, Essex and Warren counties
- 17th District: Franklin and St. Lawrence counties
- 18th District: Jefferson and Lewis counties
- 19th District: Oneida County
- 20th District: Herkimer and Otsego counties
- 21st District: Oswego County
- 22nd District: Onondaga County
- 23rd District: Chenango, Cortland and Madison counties
- 24th District: Broome, Tompkins and Tioga counties
- 25th District: Cayuga and Wayne counties
- 26th District: Ontario, Seneca and Yates counties
- 27th District: Chemung, Schuyler and Steuben counties
- 28th District: Monroe County
- 29th District: Genesee, Niagara and Orleans counties
- 30th District: Allegany, Livingston and Wyoming counties
- 31st District: Erie County
- 32nd District: Cattaraugus and Chautauqua counties
Note: There are now 62 counties in the State of New York. The counties which are not mentioned in this list had not yet been established, or sufficiently organized, the area being included in one or more of the abovementioned counties.

=== Members ===
The asterisk (*) denotes members of the previous Legislature who continued in office as members of this Legislature. Richard B. Connolly, Hezekiah D. Robertson, Joseph H. Ramsey, Charles C. Montgomery, James A. Bell, Allen Munroe and Lyman Truman were re-elected. Christian B. Woodruff, Richard K. Sanford and Wilkes Angel changed from the Assembly to the Senate.

Party affiliations as published by the New York Tribune; those marked "Republican" were elected in opposition to "Union" candidates. Senate officers and a Regent of USNY were elected without opposition.

District	Senator	Party	Notes
1st	Monroe Henderson	Union	due to ill health, absent from January 31
2nd	Jesse C. Smith	Union	
3rd	Henry C. Murphy	Fusion	elected unopposed
4th	Christian B. Woodruff*	Democrat	
5th	Charles G. Cornell	Democrat	from December 3, 1862, also New York City Street Commissioner
6th	John J. Bradley	Democrat	
7th	Richard B. Connolly*	Democrat	
8th	Hezekiah D. Robertson*	Union	
9th	Henry R. Low	Union	
10th	Jacob S. Freer	Democrat	
11th	William H. Tobey	Union	
12th	Ralph Richards	Union	
13th	John V. L. Pruyn	Democrat	
14th	Joseph H. Ramsey*	Union	
15th	John Willard	Fusion	elected unopposed; died on August 31, 1862
16th	Russell M. Little	Union	
17th	Charles C. Montgomery*	Union	
18th	James A. Bell*	Union	on February 11, elected president pro tempore
19th	Alexander H. Bailey	Union	
20th	George A. Hardin	Republican	
21st	Richard K. Sanford*	Fusion	elected unopposed
22nd	Allen Munroe*	Republican	
23rd	Henry A. Clark	Union	
24th	Lyman Truman*	Union	
25th	Chauncey M. Abbott	Republican	
26th	Charles J. Folger	Union	
27th	Charles Cook	Union	
28th	Lysander Farrar	Fusion	elected unopposed
29th	Almanzor Hutchinson	Union	
30th	Wilkes Angel*	Republican	
31st	John Ganson	Democrat	on November 4, 1862, elected to the 38th U.S. Congress
32nd	Horace C. Young	Republican	

=== Employees ===
- Clerk: James Terwilliger
- Sergeant-at-Arms: Richard U. Owens
- Assistant Sergeant-at-Arms: Caleb S. Babcock
- Doorkeeper: Orville Griffin
- First Assistant Doorkeeper: Charles Johnson
- Second Assistant Doorkeeper: Sanders Wilson
- Third Assistant Doorkeeper: Giles H. Holden

== State Assembly ==
=== Assemblymen ===
The asterisk (*) denotes members of the previous Legislature who continued as members of this Legislature.

Party affiliations follow the vote for Speaker.

District		Assemblymen	Party	Notes
Albany	1st	vacant		Assemblyman-elect John Vanderzee died on December 3, 1861
Albany	1st	Willet Serls	Democrat	elected to fill vacancy; seated on February 6
Albany	2nd	Almerin J. Cornell	Union	
Albany	3rd	A. Bleecker Banks	Democrat	
Albany	4th	William Doyle	Democrat	
Allegany	1st	Alvah E. Cruttenden	Union	
Allegany	2nd	Edward D. Loveridge	Union	
Broome		George Bartlett	Union	
Cattaraugus	1st	Andrew L. Allen	Union	
Cattaraugus	2nd	Addison G. Rice	Union	
Cayuga	1st	William A. Halsey	Union	
Cayuga	2nd	Smith Anthony*	Union	
Chautauqua	1st	Emry Davis	Union	
Chautauqua	2nd	Henry C. Lake	Union	
Chemung		Tracy Beadle	Union	
Chenango	1st	David B. Parce	Union	
Chenango	2nd	Francis B. Fisher	Union	
Clinton		Lemuel Stetson	Union	
Columbia	1st	Jacob Ten Broeck	Democrat	
Columbia	2nd	Samuel Wilbor	Union	
Cortland		Thomas Barry	Union	
Delaware	1st	Nelson K. Wheeler	Union	
Delaware	2nd	Daniel Waterbury*	Union	
Dutchess	1st	John B. Dutcher*	Union	
Dutchess	2nd	Edmund Green	Union	
Erie	1st	John W. Murphy	Democrat	
Erie	2nd	Horatio Seymour	Democrat	
Erie	3rd	Ezra P. Goslin	Union	
Erie	4th	John A. Case	Union	
Essex		Palmer E. Havens	Union	
Franklin		Albert Andrus	Union	
Fulton and Hamilton		James H. Burr*	Union	
Genesee		Benjamin Pringle	Union	
Greene		Jonathan B. Cowles	Democrat	
Herkimer	1st	Orson Moore	Union	
Herkimer	2nd	George Springer	Union	
Jefferson	1st	Jonathan M. Ackley	Union	
Jefferson	2nd	George W. Hazelton	Union	
Jefferson	3rd	William Dewey	Union	
Kings	1st	Andrew J. Provost*	Union	
Kings	2nd	Richard J. Lalor	Democrat	
Kings	3rd	William M. Thomas	Union	
Kings	4th	James Darcy*	Democrat	
Kings	5th	Charles L. Benedict	Union	
Kings	6th	Samuel T. Maddox	Union	
Kings	7th	Edgar McMullen	Union	
Lewis		Henry D. H. Snyder Jr.	Union	
Livingston	1st	Matthew Wiard*	Union	
Livingston	2nd	Samuel Skinner	Union	
Madison	1st	William H. Brand	Union	
Madison	2nd	Albert G. Purdy	Union	
Monroe	1st	George E. McGonegal	Union	
Monroe	2nd	Eliphaz Trimmer	Democrat	
Monroe	3rd	Benjamin R. Wells*	Union	
Montgomery		Nicholas Newkirk	Democrat	
New York	1st	John Callahan*	Democrat	
New York	2nd	Daniel Leamy	Democrat	
New York	3rd	George L. Loutrel	Democrat	
New York	4th	William J. C. Kenny*	Democrat	
New York	5th	James W. Bush	Union	
New York	6th	William J. Coey	Democrat	
New York	7th	Henry J. Raymond	Union	elected Speaker
New York	8th	William G. Olvany	Democrat	
New York	9th	Alexander McLeod	Union	
New York	10th	Daniel M. O'Brien	Democrat	
New York	11th	Noah A. Childs	Union	
New York	12th	Andrew Smith	Democrat	
New York	13th	Alexander Ward	Democrat	
New York	14th	Royal Phelps	Union	
New York	15th	David S. Coddington	Democrat	
New York	16th	Dennis McCabe	Union	
New York	17th	Edward Jones	Democrat	
Niagara	1st	Benjamin H. Fletcher	Democrat	
Niagara	2nd	Peter A. Porter	Union	
Oneida	1st	Charles M. Scholefield	Union	
Oneida	2nd	Eli Avery	Union	
Oneida	3rd	Thomas D. Penfield	Union	
Oneida	4th	Jeremiah Sweet	Union	
Onondaga	1st	Frederick A. Lyman	Union	
Onondaga	2nd	Thomas G. Alvord	Union	
Onondaga	3rd	R. Nelson Gere	Union	
Ontario	1st	David Picket	Union	
Ontario	2nd	Francis O. Mason	Union	
Orange	1st	Daniel R. Hudson	Union	
Orange	2nd	John Van Etten Jr.	Democrat	
Orleans		Nicholas E. Darrow	Union	
Oswego	1st	Elias Root	Union	
Oswego	2nd	Willard Johnson	Democrat	
Oswego	3rd	Benjamin E. Bowen	Union	
Otsego	1st	LeRoy E. Bowe	Union	
Otsego	2nd	Cornelius A. Church	Union	
Putnam		Thomas H. Reed	Union	
Queens	1st	Isaac Coles	Union	
Queens	2nd	Henry D. Hall	Democrat	
Rensselaer	1st	Charles J. Saxe*	Democrat	
Rensselaer	2nd	David G. Maxon	Union	
Rensselaer	3rd	Sylvester Waterbury	Democrat	
Richmond		Smith Ely	Democrat	
Rockland		James S. Haring	Democrat	
St. Lawrence	1st	Elias P. Townsley	Union	
St. Lawrence	2nd	James Redington	Union	
St. Lawrence	3rd	Calvin T. Hulburd	Union	on November 4, 1862, elected to the 38th U.S. Congress
Saratoga	1st	John Fulton*	Union	
Saratoga	2nd	Nathaniel M. Houghton	Union	
Schenectady		Simon J. Schermerhorn	Union	
Schoharie		William Lamont	Democrat	
Schuyler		Alvin C. Hause	Union	
Seneca		Peter J. Van Vleet	Democrat	
Steuben	1st	Daniel B. Bryan*	Union	
Steuben	2nd	Henry Sherwood	Union	
Steuben	3rd	Samuel M. Alley	Union	
Suffolk	1st	John C. Davis	Union	
Suffolk	2nd	John S. Havens	Democrat	
Sullivan		Benjamin L. Ludington	Union	
Tioga		Benjamin F. Tracy	Union	
Tompkins		Ezra Cornell	Union	
Ulster	1st	Jesse F. Bookstaver	Democrat	
Ulster	2nd	George T. Pierce*	Union	
Ulster	3rd	Ebenezer Westbrook	Democrat	
Warren		Thomas S. Gray	Democrat	
Washington	1st	George H. Taylor	Union	
Washington	2nd	Philip H. Neher	Union	
Wayne	1st	Eron N. Thomas	Union	
Wayne	2nd	Abram Pryne	Union	
Westchester	1st	Pierre C. Talman	Democrat	
Westchester	2nd	Newberry D. Halsted	Democrat	
Westchester	3rd	Chauncey M. Depew	Union	
Wyoming		Lucius Peck	Union	
Yates		Darius A. Ogden	Union	

=== Employees ===
- Clerk: Joseph B. Cushman
- Sergeant-at-Arms: Levi M. Gano
- Doorkeeper: Norman B. Sprague
- First Assistant Doorkeeper: William H. Creed
- Second Assistant Doorkeeper: Thomas Miller

== Sources ==
- The New York Civil List compiled by Franklin Benjamin Hough, Stephen C. Hutchins and Edgar Albert Werner (1867; see pg. 439 for Senate districts; pg. 443 for senators; pg. 450–462 for Assembly districts; and pg. 494ff for assemblymen)
- Journal of the Senate (85th Session) (1862)
- Journal of the Assembly (85th Session) (1862)
- Biographical Sketches of the State Officers and the Members of the Legislature of the State of New York in 1862 and '63 by William D. Murphy (1863)
