= William Ferry =

William Ferry may refer to:

- William Montague Ferry (1796–1867), Presbyterian minister and missionary
- W. Mont Ferry (William Montague Ferry, 1871–1938), Utah state senator and mayor of Salt Lake City
- William H. Ferry (1819–1880), American politician from New York
- William Montague Ferry Jr. (1824–1905), Michigan and Utah politician and Union Army officer
