= Andrew J. Provost =

American politician

Andrew Jackson Provost (April 2, 1834 – April 22, 1925) was an American lawyer and politician from New York.

== Life ==
Provost was born on April 2, 1834, in New York City, the son of David Provost, who served as justice of the peace for over 20 years, and Elizabeth Hendrickson.

Provost attended Williston Seminary, graduating from there in 1851. He then studied law under Cram & Cornell of New York City from 1852 to 1855. He was admitted to the bar in 1855 and became the senior partner of the law firm Provost, Fisher & Daily in Williamsburg. One of his partners was assemblyman George H. Fisher.

Provost served in the New York State Assembly, representing the Kings County 1st District, in 1861 (as a Democrat) and 1862 (as a Union Democrat). He was a member of the Brooklyn Board of Education from 1864 to 1868, a justice of the peace and police justice in Queens County from 1870 to 1878, school commissioner of Queens County from 1874 to 1878, and president of the board of education of the fifth district of Flushing for five years. He moved his law practice to Manhattan in 1880.

In 1856, Provost married Harriet Titus, daughter of Obadiah Titus. Their children were Florence, Andrew J. Jr., and William Douglass. He served in the Consistory of the First Reformed Church of Brooklyn. He was a member of the Long Island Historical Society, the Holland Society, the Saint Nicholas Society, the Freemasons, and the Knights Templar.

Provost died at home on April 22, 1925. He was buried in Cypress Hills Cemetery.

New York State Assembly
Preceded by Andrew A. Myers	New York State Assembly; Kings County, 1st District; 1861–1862	Succeeded by John Paulding
