= 147th New York Infantry Regiment =

- State flag from 1778 to 1901
- Active: September 22, 1862 (mustered in)–June 7, 1865 (mustered out)
- Disbanded: June 7, 1865
- Country: United States
- Allegiance: Union
- Branch: Infantry
- Size: Regiment
- Engagements: American Civil War; Battle of Chancellorsville; Battle of Gettysburg; Mine Run Campaign; Battle of the Wilderness; Battle of Spotsylvania Court House; Battle of North Anna; Battle of Totopotomoy Creek; Battle of Cold Harbor; Siege of Petersburg; Battle of Globe Tavern; Battle of Peebles's Farm; Battle of Boydton Plank Road; Battle of Hatcher's Run; Battle of White Oak Road; Battle of Five Forks; Third Battle of Petersburg; Battle of Appomattox Court House

Commanders
- Colonel: Andrew S. Warner
- Colonel: John G. Butler
- Colonel: Francis C. Miller

Insignia
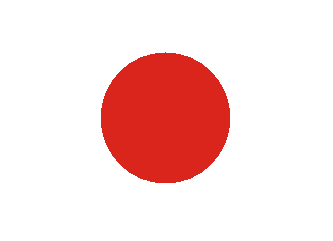
- 1st Division, I Corps

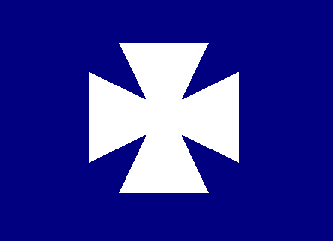
- 2nd Div, V Corps

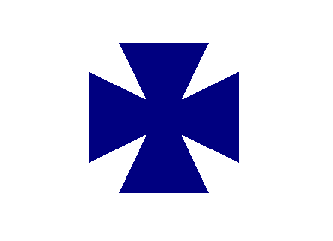
- 3rd/4th Div, V Corps

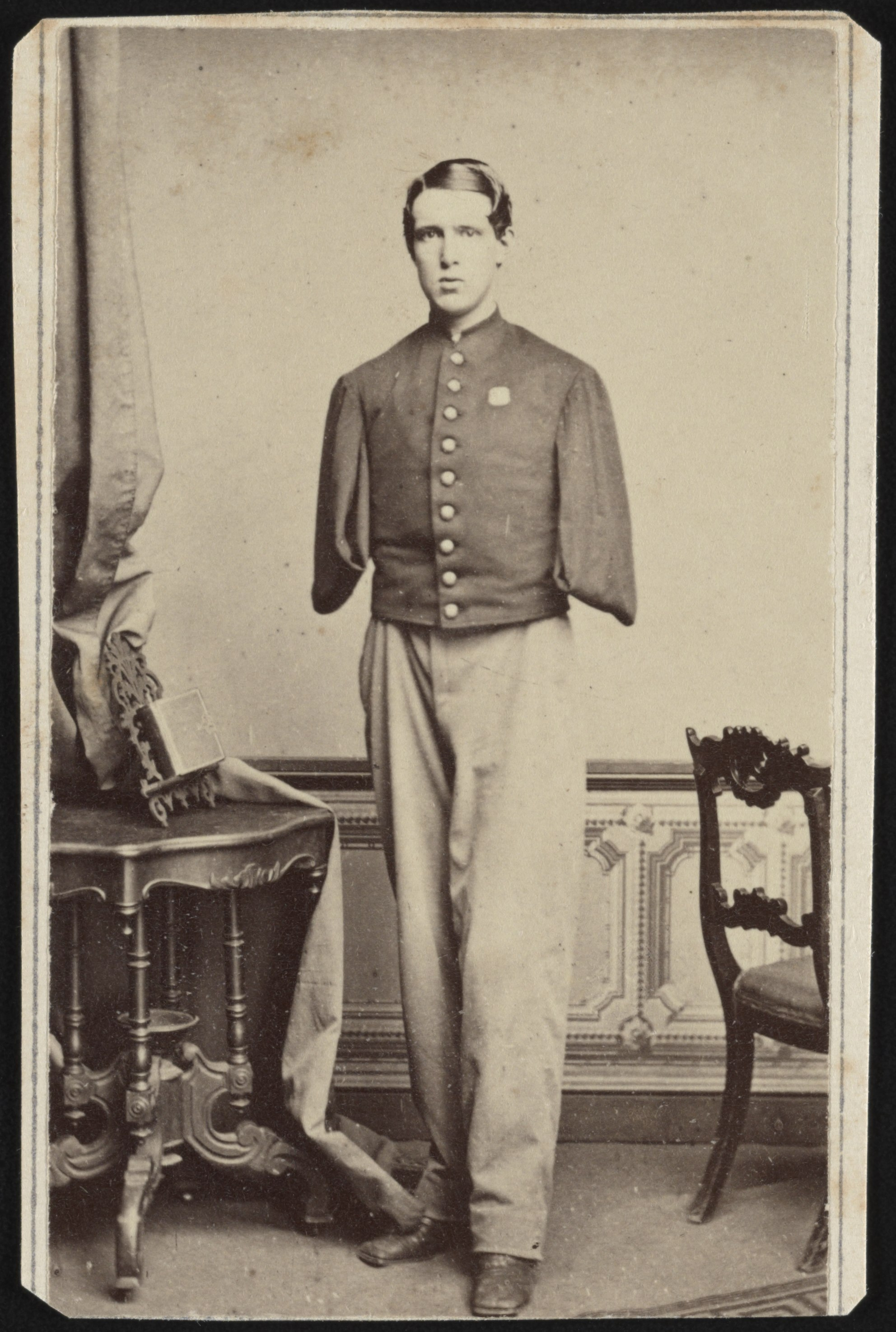
Sergeant Alfred A. Stratton of Co. G, 147th New York Infantry. He lost his arms on June 18, 1864, at Petersburg, Virginia.

The 147th New York Infantry Regiment, the "Oswego Regiment" or "Ploughboys", was an infantry regiment of the Union Army during the American Civil War.

== Service ==
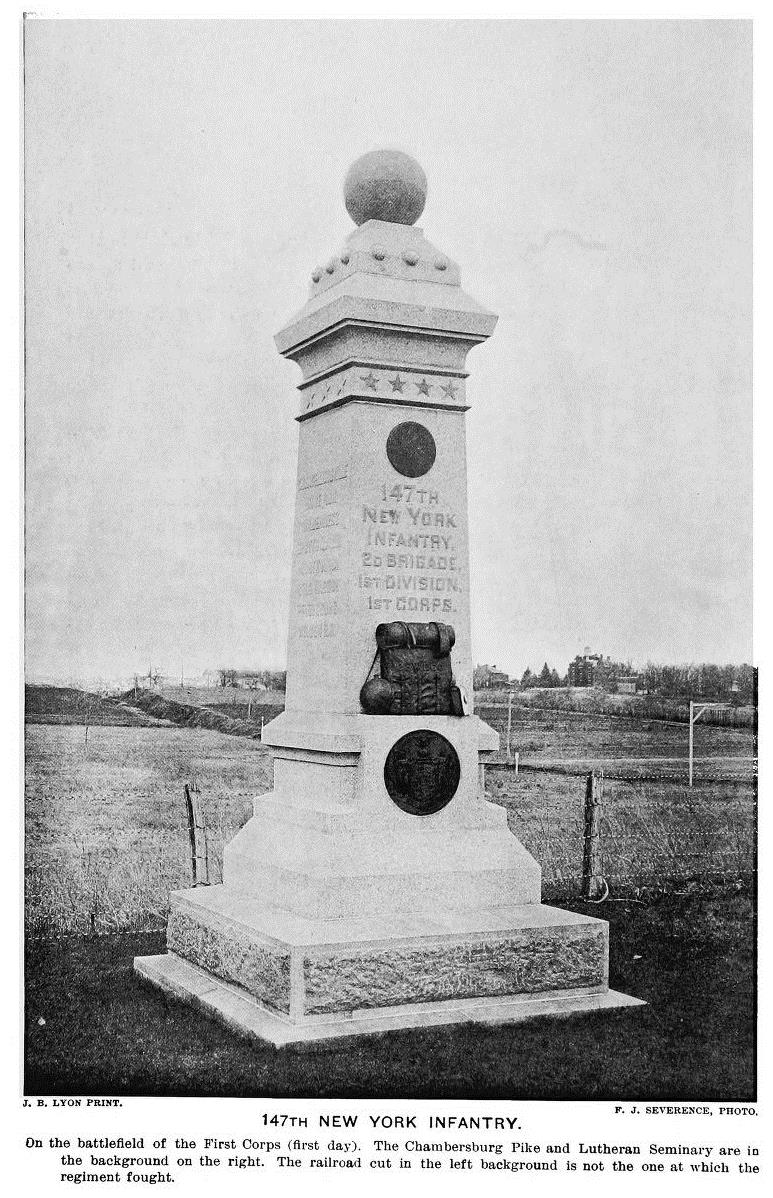
147th New York Infantry Monument at Gettysburg Battlefield

The 147th New York was organized in Oswego, New York, and mustered in for three years in September 1862; all companies were recruited from Oswego County.

The regiment left the State in September 1862 and served in the defenses of Washington; in the Provost Guard of the Army of the Potomac, from December; in 1st Division, 1st Corps, from March 1863; in multiple divisions of 5th Corps from March 1864; and was honorably discharged and mustered out June 7, 1865, near Washington, D.C.

The 147th, after serving in defenses and on guard duty, was under fire for the first time at Fitzhugh's crossing below Fredericksburg, one of the first movements of the Chancellorsville campaign, losing some killed and wounded. It was in reserve at Chancellorsville and sustained no losses. It marched on the field at the opening of Gettysburg where the order to retire failed to reach them as their commander was wounded, so they temporarily held their ground with significant casualties. The regiment took part in the Mine Run campaign—the last campaign of the 1st corps—sustaining a few casualties, and then went into winter quarters at Brandy Station. In March, 1864, when the 1st corps was broken up, it was assigned to the 5th (Warren's) corps, and was actively engaged in all the battles of the corps during Grant's bloody campaign of 1864–65.

== Total strength and casualties ==
The total enrollment of the regiment during service was 2,102. During its service the regiment lost by death, killed in action, 5 officers, 107 enlisted men; of wounds received in action, 4 officers, 52 enlisted men; of disease and other causes, 2 officers, 177 enlisted men; total, 11 officers, 336 enlisted men; aggregate, 347; of whom 71 enlisted men died in the hands of the enemy.

== Commanders ==
- Colonel Andrew S. Warner
- Colonel John G. Butler
- Colonel Francis C. Miller

== See also ==
- List of New York Civil War regiments
