= Saxton Smith =

American politician (1802–1890)

Member of the New York Senate from the 8th district
- In office 1864–1865
- Preceded by: Hezekiah D. Robertson
- Succeeded by: Edmund G. Sutherland

Member of the New York Senate from the 7th district
- In office 1848–1849
- Preceded by: new district
- Succeeded by: Benjamin Brandreth

Member of the New York Senate from the 2nd district
- In office 1846–1847
- Preceded by: Abraham Bockee
- Succeeded by: district abolished

Member of the New York State Assembly from the Putnam County district
- In office 1863–1863
- Preceded by: Thomas H. Reed
- Succeeded by: Jeremiah Sherwood

Member of the New York State Assembly from the Putnam County district
- In office 1844–1844
- Preceded by: Sylvenus Warren
- Succeeded by: Benjamin Bailey

Member of the New York State Assembly from the Putnam County district
- In office 1840–1840
- Preceded by: Herman R. Stephens
- Succeeded by: James H. Cornwall

Member of the New York State Assembly from the Putnam County district
- In office 1838–1838
- Preceded by: John Crawford
- Succeeded by: Herman R. Stephens

Personal details
- Born: October 2, 1802 Philipstown, Dutchess County, New York, U.S.
- Died: 1890 (aged 87–88)
- Party: Democratic
- Occupation: Politician

Saxton Smith (October 2, 1802 – 1890) was an American politician from New York. He served in the New York State Assembly and the New York State Senate over a period spanning nearly three decades, and was also a long-time town supervisor of Putnam Valley.

== Early life ==
Smith was born on October 2, 1802, at the house built by his grandfather, located in that part of Philipstown, New York, then in Dutchess County, which was separated in 1839 as the Town of Quincy, and renamed in 1840 as Putnam Valley, now in Putnam County. He was the son of Abraham Smith (1763–1813) and Mary (Knapp) Smith.

== Political career ==
=== Town Supervisor ===
Smith served as Supervisor of the Town of Putnam Valley in 1841, 1842, 1850, 1851, 1858, 1860, 1862, 1863, and from 1867 to 1876.

=== State Assembly ===
Smith was a member of the New York State Assembly (Putnam County) in 1838, 1840, and 1844.

He was again a member of the State Assembly in 1863.

=== State Senate ===
Smith was a member of the New York State Senate from 1846 to 1849, sitting in the 69th and 70th legislatures (both 2nd District), and the 71st and 72nd legislatures (both 7th District).

He was again a member of the State Senate (8th District) in 1864 and 1865.

== Personal life ==
Saxton Smith never married.

He died in 1890.

New York State Assembly
Preceded by John Crawford	New York State Assembly; Putnam County; 1838	Succeeded by Herman R. Stephens
Preceded by Herman R. Stephens	New York State Assembly; Putnam County; 1840	Succeeded by James H. Cornwall
Preceded by Sylvenus Warren	New York State Assembly; Putnam County; 1844	Succeeded by Benjamin Bailey
Preceded by Thomas H. Reed	New York State Assembly; Putnam County; 1863	Succeeded by Jeremiah Sherwood
New York State Senate
Preceded by Abraham Bockee	New York State Senate; 2nd District (Class 3); 1846–1847	Succeeded by district abolished
Preceded by new district	New York State Senate; 7th District; 1848–1849	Succeeded by Benjamin Brandreth
Preceded by Hezekiah D. Robertson	New York State Senate; 8th District; 1864–1865	Succeeded by Edmund G. Sutherland
