= James Darcy (New York politician) =

American politician

James Darcy (November 12, 1834 – September 1, 1863) was an American politician from New York.

== Life ==
Darcy was born on November 12, 1834, in Buffalo, New York, the son of Daniel Darcy and Eliza Devenport. His father Daniel was an Irish immigrant and prominent Buffalo political figure. His brother Charles was the Buffalo Chief of Police, and his other brother Daniel Jr. was Deputy Sheriff of Erie County.

In 1851, Darcy moved to Brooklyn, where he worked as a house-carpenter. In 1859, he was elected to the New York State Assembly as a Democrat, representing the Kings County 4th District. He served in the Assembly in 1860, 1861, 1862, and 1863.

Darcy died at home on September 1, 1863.

New York State Assembly
Preceded by Thomas A. Gardiner	New York State Assembly; Kings County, 4th District; 1860–1863	Succeeded by Andrew Walsh
