= James H. Tuthill =

American politician

James Harvey Tuthill
- Born: February 19, 1826; Wading River, New York, U.S.
- Died: January 18, 1894 (aged 67); Riverhead, New York, U.S.
- Education: Williams College
- Occupations: Lawyer, Politician, Judge
- Political party: Republican
- Spouse: Maria Frances Foster (m. 1850)
- Children: Ruth Halsey
- Parent(s): Nathaniel Tuthill, Clarissa Miller
- Relatives: Franklin Tuthill (brother)

James Harvey Tuthill (February 19, 1826 – January 18, 1894) was a New York American lawyer, politician, and judge.

== Life ==
Tuthill was born on February 19, 1826, in Wading River, New York, the son of seafarer and merchant Captain Nathaniel Tuthill and Clarissa Miller. The family moved to Greenport when he was eleven. His brother was Franklin Tuthill, an assemblyman and editor of The New York Times.

Tuthill studied at the Miller Place Academy for three years, winning distinction at the school. When he was seventeen, he entered the Sophomore class at Williams College. He graduated from there three years later with honors. He then began studying law, first with his mother's relative Judge George Miller of Riverhead then with Judge Joseph S. Bosworth of New York City. He was then admitted to the bar and in 1849 he began practicing law in Riverhead with Judge Miller. The firm was known as Miller & Tuthill. He was originally a Whig.

In 1860, Tuthill was elected to the New York State Assembly as a Republican, representing the Suffolk County 1st District. He served in the Assembly in 1861 and 1866. He then served as district attorney of Suffolk County from 1867 to 1875, followed by Surrogate of the county from 1880 to 1892.

Tuthill was a director of the Suffolk County National Bank and attorney, legal advisor, and trustee of the Riverhead Savings Bank. He joined the Long Island Historical Society when it was founded in 1863, and was one of its councilors from 1864 until his death. He helped organize the Suffolk County Historical Society in 1886 and served as its first president until his death. He helped organize the Riverhead Village Library Association, donating a number of valuable books from his own library to the association. He was a leading member of the local Congregational Church, serving as superintendent of its Sunday school for forty-four years and president of the Suffolk County Sunday-school Association for more than twenty years. In 1850, he married Maria Frances Foster. Their only child was Ruth Halsey.

Tuthill died from a brain hemorrhage while at the Surrogate's office in a trial of a will case on January 18, 1894. He was buried in Riverhead Cemetery.

New York State Assembly
Preceded by Philander R. Jennings	New York State Assembly; Suffolk County, 1st District; 1861	Succeeded by John C. Davis
Preceded by William H. Gleason	New York State Assembly; Suffolk County, 1st District; 1866	Succeeded by District Abolished
