= Lysander Farrar =

American politician (1812–1876)

Lysander Farrar (May 2, 1812 – December 25, 1876) was an American lawyer and politician from Watertown, New York.

== Life ==
He was the son of Josiah Farrar (c.1772–1824). He graduated M.A. from Union College in 1836, and became Principal of the Jamestown Academy. On August 8, 1839, he married Melissa Malvina Keyes (1820–1892), and they had five children.

Then he studied law, was admitted to the bar, and practiced in Rochester. He was a member of the New York State Senate (28th D.) in 1862 and 1863.

== Sources ==
- The New York Civil List compiled by Franklin Benjamin Hough, Stephen C. Hutchins and Edgar Albert Werner (1870; pg. 443)
- Biographical Sketches of the State Officers and the Members of the Legislature of the State of New York in 1862 and '63 by William D. Murphy (1863; pg. 64ff)
- The New York Annual Register (1836; pg. 248)
- A General Catalogue of the Officers, Graduates and Students of Union College from 1795 to 1854 (pg. 55)

New York State Senate
Preceded by Ephraim Goss	New York State Senate; 28th District; 1862–1863	Succeeded by George G. Munger
