= William Andrus =

American politician

William Andrus (September 27, 1806 – March 10, 1884) was an American coach driver, farmer, and politician from New York.

== Life ==
Andrus was born on September 27, 1806, in Malone, New York, the son of Cone Andrus and Melinda House. His brothers were assemblymen Lucius C. Andrus and Albert Andrus.

Andrus went to school in Danbury, Connecticut. After finishing school, he returned to Malone and initially worked as a clerk in Jonathan Stearns' store. He soon left the job and worked for Jonathan Thompson, driving a mail coach between Plattsburgh and Ogdensburg until 1832. In 1842, he became a proprietor of that mail route, which he maintained until it was superseded by the railroad in 1851. When the Bank of Malone was founded in 1851, he became one of its directors, a position he was annually re-elected to. He was the only surviving member of the original board when he died. He also worked as a farmer and sold village lots from large tracts of land his father owned.

Andrus was town supervisor of Malone from 1847 to 1852 and from 1857 to 1860. He was initially a conservative Whig, later joining the American Party and then the Republican Party. He served as sheriff of Franklin County from 1839 to 1842. In 1860, he was elected to the New York State Assembly as a Republican, representing Franklin County. He served in the Assembly in 1861. He again served as town supervisor from 1864 to 1870. He often served as a village trustee, and was president of the board. He was a delegate to the 1872 Republican National Convention.

In 1832, Andrus married Susan Roberts of Chateangay. They had three surviving sons. He was a member and senior warden of St. Mark's Episcopal Church.

Andrus died at home on March 10, 1884. He was buried in Morningside Cemetery in Malone.

New York State Assembly
Preceded by Wells S. Dickinson	New York State Assembly; Franklin County; 1861	Succeeded by Albert Andrus
