= 84th New York State Legislature =

New York state legislative session

←	83rd	85th	→
- The Old State Capitol (1879)

Overview
- Legislative body: New York State Legislature
- Jurisdiction: New York, United States
- Term: January 1 – December 31, 1861

Senate
- Members: 32
- President: Lt. Gov. Robert Campbell (R)
- Temporary President: Ephraim Goss (R), on February 8 Peter P. Murphy (R), on March 7 Erastus S. Prosser (R), on March 25; William H. Ferry, from March 25
- Party control: Republican (23-9)

Assembly
- Members: 128
- Speaker: DeWitt C. Littlejohn (R)
- Party control: Republican (93-35)

Sessions
- 1st: January 1 – April 16, 1861

The 84th New York State Legislature, consisting of the New York State Senate and the New York State Assembly, met from January 1 to April 16, 1861, during the third year of Edwin D. Morgan's governorship, in Albany.

== Background ==
Under the provisions of the New York Constitution of 1846, 32 Senators and 128 assemblymen were elected in single-seat districts; senators for a two-year term, assemblymen for a one-year term. The senatorial districts were made up of entire counties, except New York County (four districts) and Kings County (two districts). The Assembly districts were made up of entire towns, or city wards, forming a contiguous area, all within the same county.

At this time there were two major political parties: the Republican Party and the Democratic Party. The Democrats split over the slavery issue and presidential nomination. Two state tickets were nominated, one supporting Stephen A. Douglas for president, the other supporting John C. Breckinridge.

== Elections ==
The 1860 New York state election was held on November 6. Gov. Edwin D. Morgan and Lt. Gov. Robert Campbell (both Rep.) were re-elected. The other two statewide elective offices were also carried by the Republicans. The approximate party strength at this election, as expressed by the vote for Governor was: Republican 358,000; Douglas Democratic 294,000; and Breckinridge Democratic 19,000.

== Sessions ==
The Legislature met for the regular session at the Old State Capitol in Albany on January 1, 1861; and adjourned on April 16.

DeWitt C. Littlejohn (R) was re-elected Speaker with 90 votes against 31 for Francis Kernan (D).

On January 16, the Legislature elected Benjamin F. Bruce (R) as Canal Commissioner, to fill the vacancy caused by the death of Commissioner-elect Samuel H. Barnes (R).

On February 5, the Legislature elected Ex-Supreme Court Justice Ira Harris (R) to succeed William H. Seward as U.S. Senator from New York for a six-year term beginning on March 4, 1861.

On February 8, Ephraim Goss (R) was elected president pro tempore of the State Senate "for this day."

On February 19, Jay Gibbons (D) asked the Assembly to appoint a Select Committee to investigate allegations that he had "corruptly solicited a consideration for his official action in regard to a bill now pending before this House, to increase the salary of the assistant district attorney of the County of Albany." Speaker Littlejohn appointed assemblymen Bingham, Tuthill (both R), Hutchings, Kernan and Taber (all three D) to this committee. Mitchell Sanford and Theophilus C. Callicot appeared for Gibbons's defence during the proceedings.

On March 7, Peter P. Murphy (R) was elected president pro tempore of the State Senate "for this day." On the same day, a Committee was appointed to "enquire and report whether it be necessary to appoint a President pro tempore, or whether the President pro tempore chosen at the previous session holds his office during the present session."

On March 12, the Committee reported that it is necessary to appoint a President pro tempore, and that the President pro tempore chosen at the previous session does not continue in office at the next session. Besides, the committee opined that a President pro tempore can only be appointed if the Lieutenant Governor is actually absent, and that the appointment ceases whenever the Lieutenant Governor returns.

On March 25, Erastus S. Prosser (R) was elected president pro tempore of the State Senate "for this day." Later on the same day, William H. Ferry (R) was elected president pro tempore of the State Senate "for the balance of the Session."

On April 3, the Select Committee's resolution to expel Jay Gibbons was adopted by a vote of 99 to 8.

== State Senate ==
=== Districts ===
- 1st District: Queens, Richmond and Suffolk counties
- 2nd District: 1st, 2nd, 3rd, 4th, 5th, 7th, 11th, 13th and 19th wards of the City of Brooklyn
- 3rd District: 6th, 8th, 9th, 10th, 12th, 14th, 15th, 16th, 17th and 18th wards of the City of Brooklyn; and all towns in Kings County
- 4th District: 1st, 2nd, 3rd, 4th, 5th, 6th, 7th, 8th and 14th wards of New York City
- 5th District: 10th, 11th, 13th and 17th wards of New York City
- 6th District: 9th, 15th, 16th and 18th wards of New York City
- 7th District: 12th, 19th, 20th, 21st and 22nd wards of New York City
- 8th District: Putnam, Rockland and Westchester counties
- 9th District: Orange and Sullivan counties
- 10th District: Greene and Ulster counties
- 11th District: Columbia and Dutchess counties
- 12th District: Rensselaer and Washington counties
- 13th District: Albany County
- 14th District: Delaware, Schenectady and Schoharie counties
- 15th District: Fulton, Hamilton, Montgomery and Saratoga counties
- 16th District: Clinton, Essex and Warren counties
- 17th District: Franklin and St. Lawrence counties
- 18th District: Jefferson and Lewis counties
- 19th District: Oneida County
- 20th District: Herkimer and Otsego counties
- 21st District: Oswego County
- 22nd District: Onondaga County
- 23rd District: Chenango, Cortland and Madison counties
- 24th District: Broome, Tompkins and Tioga counties
- 25th District: Cayuga and Wayne counties
- 26th District: Ontario, Seneca and Yates counties
- 27th District: Chemung, Schuyler and Steuben counties
- 28th District: Monroe County
- 29th District: Genesee, Niagara and Orleans counties
- 30th District: Allegany, Livingston and Wyoming counties
- 31st District: Erie County
- 32nd District: Cattaraugus and Chautauqua counties
Note: There are now 62 counties in the State of New York. The counties which are not mentioned in this list had not yet been established, or sufficiently organized, the area being included in one or more of the abovementioned counties.

=== Members ===
The asterisk (*) denotes members of the previous Legislature who continued in office as members of this Legislature.

District	Senator	Party	Notes
1st	Edward A. Lawrence*	Democrat	
2nd	Thomas A. Gardiner*	Democrat	
3rd	Francis B. Spinola*	Democrat	
4th	John McLeod Murphy*	Democrat	
5th	Bernard Kelly*	Democrat	
6th	Benjamin F. Manierre*	Republican	
7th	Richard B. Connolly*	Democrat	
8th	Hezekiah D. Robertson*	Republican	also Supervisor of Bedford
9th	Robert Y. Grant*	Democrat	
10th	Joshua Fiero Jr.*	Republican	
11th	John H. Ketcham*	Republican	
12th	Volney Richmond*	Republican	
13th	Andrew J. Colvin*	Democrat	
14th	Joseph H. Ramsey*	Republican	
15th	Isaiah Blood*	Democrat	
16th	Nathan Lapham*	Republican	
17th	Charles C. Montgomery*	Republican	
18th	James A. Bell*	Republican	
19th	William H. Ferry*	Republican	on March 25, elected president pro tempore
20th	Francis M. Rotch*	Republican	
21st	Andrew S. Warner*	Republican	
22nd	Allen Munroe*	Republican	
23rd	Perrin H. McGraw*	Republican	
24th	Lyman Truman*	Republican	
25th	Alexander B. Williams*	Republican	
26th	Thomas Hillhouse*	Republican	
27th	Samuel H. Hammond*	Republican	
28th	Ephraim Goss*	Republican	on February 8, elected president pro tempore
29th	Peter P. Murphy*	Republican	on March 7, elected president pro tempore
30th	David H. Abell*	Republican	
31st	Erastus S. Prosser*	Republican	on March 25, elected president pro tempore
32nd	Walter L. Sessions*	Republican	

=== Employees ===
- Clerk: James Terwilliger
- Sergeant-at-Arms: James C. Clark
- Assistant Sergeant-at-Arms: George H. Knapp
- Doorkeeper: Peter Kilmer
- First Assistant Doorkeeper: Charles Johnson
- Second Assistant Doorkeeper: John H. France
- Third Assistant Doorkeeper: Caspar Walter

== State Assembly ==
=== Assemblymen ===
The asterisk (*) denotes members of the previous Legislature who continued as members of this Legislature.

Party affiliations follow the vote for Speaker and U.S. Senator.

District		Assemblymen	Party	Notes
Albany	1st	Jay Gibbons	Democrat	expelled on April 3
Albany	2nd	Lewis Benedict Jr.	Republican	
Albany	3rd	Henry Lansing	Democrat	
Albany	4th	William J. Wheeler	Democrat	
Allegany	1st	Wilkes Angel	Republican	also Supervisor of Angelica
Allegany	2nd	Lucius S. May	Republican	
Broome		Friend H. Burt	Republican	
Cattaraugus	1st	Nelson I. Norton	Republican	
Cattaraugus	2nd	Franklin Philbrick	Republican	
Cayuga	1st	Heman Benton	Republican	
Cayuga	2nd	Smith Anthony	Republican	
Chautauqua	1st	Henry A. Prendergast	Republican	
Chautauqua	2nd	Hiram Smith 2d*	Republican	
Chemung		Lucius Robinson*	Republican	on November 5, 1861, elected State Comptroller
Chenango	1st	Thomas Carter	Republican	
Chenango	2nd	Samuel E. Lewis	Republican	
Clinton		Henry McFadden*	Republican	
Columbia	1st	Samuel Lasher	Republican	
Columbia	2nd	Norton S. Collin	Republican	
Cortland		Loammi Kinney	Republican	
Delaware	1st	Seymour E. Smith	Republican	
Delaware	2nd	Daniel Waterbury	Republican	
Dutchess	1st	John B. Dutcher	Republican	
Dutchess	2nd	Samuel J. Farnum	Republican	
Erie	1st	Stephen V. R. Watson	Republican	
Erie	2nd	Victor M. Rice	Republican	
Erie	3rd	Benjamin H. Long	Democrat	
Erie	4th	Zebulon Ferris	Republican	
Essex		Martin Finch*	Republican	
Franklin		William Andrus	Republican	
Fulton and Hamilton		James H. Burr	Republican	
Genesee		George W. Wright	Republican	
Greene		Gilbert Bedell	Democrat	
Herkimer	1st	John Markell	Republican	
Herkimer	2nd	Josiah Shull	Republican	
Jefferson	1st	David Montague	Republican	
Jefferson	2nd	David J. Wager	Republican	
Jefferson	3rd	Harvey Bailey	Republican	
Kings	1st	Andrew J. Provost	Democrat	
Kings	2nd	Marquis D. Moore	Republican	
Kings	3rd	Nathan Comstock	Republican	
Kings	4th	James Darcy*	Democrat	
Kings	5th	Lucius C. Andrus	Republican	
Kings	6th	Joseph Nesbitt	Democrat	
Kings	7th	George H. Fisher*	Republican	
Lewis		Edmund Baldwin	Republican	
Livingston	1st	Matthew Wiard	Republican	
Livingston	2nd	George Hyland	Republican	
Madison	1st	Orrin B. Lord	Republican	
Madison	2nd	Francis A. Hyatt	Republican	
Monroe	1st	Martin Roberts	Republican	
Monroe	2nd	Lewis H. Morgan	Republican	
Monroe	3rd	Benjamin R. Wells	Republican	
Montgomery		Frothingham Fish	Republican	
New York	1st	John Callahan	Democrat	
New York	2nd	William Walsh*	Democrat	
New York	3rd	Christian B. Woodruff*	Democrat	
New York	4th	William J. C. Kenny	Democrat	unsuccessfully contested by Lewis Hopps
New York	5th	John J. Shaw	Republican	
New York	6th	Samuel T. Webster*	Democrat	
New York	7th	Daniel Young	Democrat	
New York	8th	Andrew Craft	Republican	
New York	9th	Horatio N. Sherwood	Republican	
New York	10th	Luke F. Cozans	Democrat	
New York	11th	John Hardy	Democrat	
New York	12th	John Lambrecht	Republican	
New York	13th	Charles E. Birdsall	Republican	
New York	14th	Robert C. Hutchings	Democrat	
New York	15th	George W. Varian*	Democrat	
New York	16th	Henry Arcularius*	Democrat	unsuccessfully contested by Dennis McCabe (R)
New York	17th	Jay Jarvis Jones	Democrat	
Niagara	1st	Henry P. Smith	Republican	
Niagara	2nd	Oliver P. Scovell	Republican	
Oneida	1st	Francis Kernan	Democrat	
Oneida	2nd	Levi T. Marshall	Republican	
Oneida	3rd	Marquis L. Kenyon	Democrat	
Oneida	4th	William Lewis	Republican	
Onondaga	1st	Jeremiah Emerick*	Republican	
Onondaga	2nd	Austin Myers*	Republican	
Onondaga	3rd	Abner Chapman	Republican	
Ontario	1st	Perez H. Field	Republican	
Ontario	2nd	Stephen H. Ainsworth	Republican	
Orange	1st	Stephen W. Fullerton Jr.	Republican	
Orange	2nd	Milton Barnes	Democrat	
Orleans		Gideon Randall	Republican	
Oswego	1st	DeWitt C. Littlejohn*	Republican	re-elected Speaker
Oswego	2nd	Richard K. Sanford	Republican	
Oswego	3rd	Mason Salisbury	Republican	
Otsego	1st	Elijah E. Ferrey	Republican	
Otsego	2nd	Frederick A. Bolles	Republican	
Putnam		Charles T. Brewster	Republican	
Queens	1st	Stephen Taber*	Democrat	
Queens	2nd	John D. Townsend	Democrat	
Rensselaer	1st	Charles J. Saxe	Democrat	
Rensselaer	2nd	L. Chandler Ball	Republican	
Rensselaer	3rd	Anson Bingham*	Republican	
Richmond		N. Dane Ellingwood	Democrat	
Rockland		William R. Knapp	Democrat	
St. Lawrence	1st	Charles Richardson*	Republican	
St. Lawrence	2nd	Edwin A. Merritt*	Republican	
St. Lawrence	3rd	Clark S. Chittenden*	Republican	
Saratoga	1st	John Fulton*	Democrat	
Saratoga	2nd	James Sumner Jr.	Republican	
Schenectady		Alonzo Macomber	Republican	
Schoharie		Joseph Buckbee	Democrat	
Schuyler		Abram V. Mekeel	Republican	
Seneca		William Johnson	Democrat	
Steuben	1st	Daniel B. Bryan	Republican	
Steuben	2nd	Jeffrey Smith	Republican	
Steuben	3rd	Redman S. Davis	Republican	
Suffolk	1st	James H. Tuthill	Republican	
Suffolk	2nd	Alexander J. Bergen	Democrat	
Sullivan		Stephen St. John Gardner	Democrat	
Tioga		Cero F. Barber	Republican	
Tompkins		Jeremiah W. Dwight*	Republican	
Ulster	1st	Robert Loughran	Republican	
Ulster	2nd	George T. Pierce	Republican	
Ulster	3rd	Benjamin Turner Jr.	Republican	
Warren		Walter A. Faxon	Republican	
Washington	1st	Peter Hill	Republican	
Washington	2nd	Nicholas M. Catlin	Republican	
Wayne	1st	Jabez S. L'Amoreaux	Republican	
Wayne	2nd	Joseph W. Corning	Republican	
Westchester	1st	William J. McDermott	Democrat	
Westchester	2nd	N. Holmes Odell*	Democrat	
Westchester	3rd	Benjamin F. Camp	Republican	
Wyoming		John J. Doolittle	Republican	
Yates		Gilbert Sherer	Republican	

=== Employees ===
- Clerk: Hanson A. Risley
- Sergeant-at-Arms: Charles D. Easton
- Doorkeeper: George C. Dennis
- First Assistant Doorkeeper: Henry Henderson
- Second Assistant Doorkeeper: Sanders Wilson

== Sources ==
- The New York Civil List compiled by Franklin Benjamin Hough, Stephen C. Hutchins and Edgar Albert Werner (1867; see pg. 439 for Senate districts; pg. 442 for senators; pg. 450–462 for Assembly districts; and pg. 492ff for assemblymen)
- Journal of the Senate (84th Session) (1861)
- Journal of the Assembly (84th Session) (1861)
- Biographical Sketches of the State Officers and Members of the Legislature of the State of New York by William D. Murphy (1861)
