= George G. Munger =

American lawyer and politician

George Goundry Munger

New York State Senate 28th District
- In office 1864–1865
- Preceded by: Lysander Farrar
- Succeeded by: Thomas Parsons

United States Attorney for the Northern District of New York
- In office 1866–1867
- Preceded by: William A. Dart
- Succeeded by: William Dorsheimer

Personal details
- Born: May 24, 1828 Morrisville, New York, U.S.
- Died: March 14, 1895 (aged 66) New York City, U.S.
- Party: Republican
- Spouse: Charlotte Sweet
- Children: Eleanore Burt, Charlotte Zerviah, Marie Louise, Georgine Dows
- Education: Williams College, Yale College, Harvard Law School
- Occupation: Lawyer, Politician

George Goundry Munger (May 24, 1828 – March 14, 1895) was an American lawyer and politician from New York.

== Life ==
Munger was born on May 24, 1828, in Morrisville, New York, the son of Perley Munger and Zerviah Chapin.

Munger moved to Rochester with his parents when he was very young. He attended Rochester High School. In 1845, he entered Williams College. He stayed there for a year, after which he entered Yale College. He was a member of the Scroll and Key and was valedictorian of his graduating class in 1848. He began studying law in the office of Henry R. Selden in Rochester, and in 1849 he entered Harvard Law School. He was admitted to the bar in 1850 and practiced law in Rochester. He initially practiced law with John N. Pomeroy, and then with Selden. After Selden was elected Lieutenant Governor, Munger formed a partnership with Sanford E. Church until Church was elected Chief Judge of the New York Court of Appeals. Shortly after he was admitted to the bar, he was elected a town supervisor of Rochester.

In 1855, Munger was elected County Judge. He resigned from the office in 1859. In 1863, he was elected to the New York State Senate as a Republican, representing New York's 28th State Senate district (Monroe County). He served in the Senate in 1864 and 1865. He served as the United States Attorney for the Northern District of New York from 1866 to 1867. In 1880, he moved to New York City, formed a partnership with Martin T. McMahon, and practiced law in that city until his death. A year prior to moving to New York City, he published a treatise on the Law of Applied Payments. He later became associated with James A. Deerling.

Munger was a member of the Rochester Historical Society and the New England Historic Genealogical Society. In 1852, he married Charlotte Sweet of Manlius. Their children were Eleanore Burt, Charlotte Zerviah, Marie Louise, and Georgine Dows.

Munger died at home on March 14, 1895.

New York State Senate
Preceded by Lysander Farrar	New York State Senate; 28th District; 1864–1865	Succeeded by Thomas Parsons
Legal offices
Preceded by William A. Dart	U.S. Attorney for the Northern District of New York; 1866–1867	Succeeded by William Dorsheimer
