= Charles Kelsey (New York politician) =

American politician

Charles Kelsey (August 24, 1821 – April 15, 1866) was an American politician from New York.

== Life ==
Kelsey was born on August 24, 1821, in Poughkeepsie, New York, the son of mechanic James Kelsey and Rachel Ellen DuBois.

Kelsey learned carpentry from his father. When he was 16 he moved to Brooklyn, where he lived for the rest of his life save for a brief period in Charleston, South Carolina. In Brooklyn, he worked as a master-builder for six years, and then began working in the coal business. He served as Collector of Assessment in the city for two years, Canal-boat Inspector for two years, and Harbor-master for two years. He was also a member of the Brooklyn Board of Education and was a trustee of the Brooklyn Benevolent Association.

Kelsey was a Whig until the dissolution of the party, at which point he briefly became a Republican before joining the Democratic Party. In 1859, Kelsey was elected to the New York State Assembly as a Democrat, representing the Kings County 2nd District. He served in the Assembly in 1860.

Kelsey was a member of the Baptist Church. In 1846, he married Elvira Preston. Their children were Jane Amelia and Frances. He was a member of the Odd Fellows.

Kelsey died in Brooklyn on April 15, 1866. He was buried in Green-Wood Cemetery.

New York State Assembly
Preceded by Marcus D. Moore	New York State Assembly; Kings County, 2nd District; 1860	Succeeded by Marquis D. Moore
