= Cheney Ames =

American businessman and politician (1808–1892)

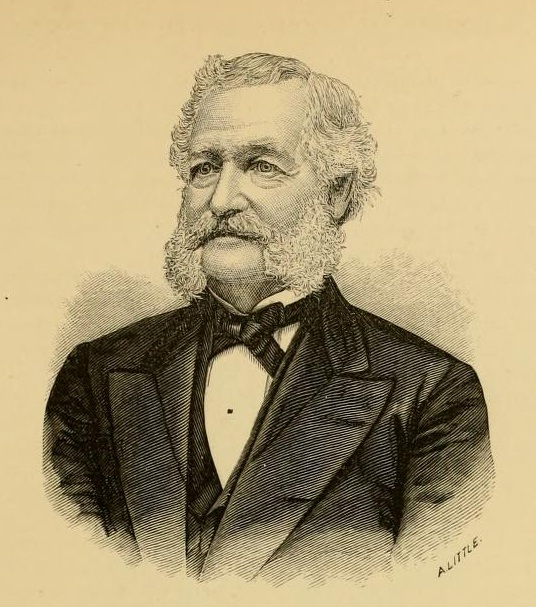
Cheney Ames (1877)

Cheney Ames (June 19, 1808 – September 14, 1892) was an American businessman and politician from New York.

== Life ==
He was born on June 19, 1808, in Mexico, New York, the son of Leonard Ames (1775–1843) and Minerva (Peck) Ames (d. 1852). He became a hatter, first in Delphi, then in Cortlandville. On October 23, 1834, he married Emily North (1817–1848), and they had six children. In 1837, he removed to Oswego, and at first set up shop as a hatter, but then became engaged in other business, like grain and flour trade; the manufacture of limewater and plaster; a knitting factory; and the construction of the New York and Oswego Midland and other railroads.

He was Postmaster of Oswego, New York, from 1849 to 1853. In 1854, he married Catherine "Kate" Brown (1832–1910), and they had four children.

He was a member of the New York State Senate (21st D.) in 1858, 1859, 1864 and 1865.

He was again Postmaster of Oswego from 1877 to 1881.

He died on September 14, 1892, in Chicago, Illinois; and was buried at the Riverside Cemetery in Oswego.

Assemblyman Leonard Ames (b. 1818) was his brother.

== Sources ==
- The New York Civil List compiled by Franklin Benjamin Hough, Stephen C. Hutchins and Edgar Albert Werner (1867; pg. 442f)
- Biographical Sketches of the State Officers and Members of the Legislature of the State of New York in 1859 by William D. Murray (pg. 32ff)
- Bio transcribed from History of Oswego County, New York, 1789 to 1877 (1878); at RootsWeb
- Obit transcribed from the Oswego Palladium, of September 15, 1892 (with portrait)
- Ames genealogy at RootsWeb

New York State Senate
Preceded by Gardner Towne	New York State Senate; 21st District; 1858–1859	Succeeded by Andrew S. Warner
Preceded by Richard K. Sanford	New York State Senate; 21st District; 1864–1865	Succeeded by John J. Wolcott
