= Russell M. Little =

American politician

Russell M. Little (December 28, 1809 in Peru, Berkshire County, Massachusetts – December 11, 1891 in Glens Falls, Warren County, New York) was an American politician from New York.

== Life ==
He was a minister of the Methodist Episcopal Church, and took up his pastoral duties in 1831 at Columbiaville, in Columbia County, New York. In August 1832, he married Nancy Blair, and they had several children. In 1842, due to pulmonary disease, he abandoned the ministry, and became instead Secretary of the Dividend Mutual Insurance Company at Glens Falls.

He was a member of the New York State Senate (16th D.) in 1862 and 1863.

He was President of the Glens Falls Insurance Company from 1864 until his death, and lived in the Russell M. Little House.

== Sources ==
- The New York Civil List compiled by Franklin Benjamin Hough, Stephen C. Hutchins and Edgar Albert Werner (1870; pg. 443)
- Biographical Sketches of the State Officers and the Members of the Legislature of the State of New York in 1862 and '63 by William D. Murphy (1863; pg. 81ff)
- OBITUARY; RUSSELL M. LITTLE in NYT on December 12, 1891

New York State Senate
Preceded by Nathan Lapham	New York State Senate; 16th District; 1862–1863	Succeeded by Palmer E. Havens
