= Thomas A. Gardiner =

American politician

Thomas A. Gardiner (August 2, 1832 New York City – May 2, 1881 Brooklyn, Kings County, New York) was an American politician from New York.

== Life ==
He was the son of George W. Gardiner (d. 1852), an Irish-born merchant. The family removed to Brooklyn in 1840.

As a Democrat, he was a member of the New York State Assembly (Kings Co., 4th D.) in 1859; a member of the New York State Senate (2nd D.) in 1860 and 1861; and Treasurer of Kings County from 1863 to 1880.

He died at his residence, at 49 Portland Ave., Brooklyn, of pulmonary hemorrhage.

== Sources ==
- The New York Civil List compiled by Franklin Benjamin Hough, Stephen C. Hutchins and Edgar Albert Werner (1867; pg. 442 and 488)
- Biographical Sketches of the State Officers and Members of the Legislature of the State of New York by William D. Murphy (1861; pg. 54ff)
- CITY AND SUBURBAN NEWS; BROOKLYN; Ex-County Treasurer Thomas A. Gardiner died... in NYT on May 3, 1881

New York State Assembly
Preceded by David M. Chauncey	New York State Assembly; Kings County, 4th District; 1859	Succeeded by James Darcy
New York State Senate
Preceded by Samuel Sloan	New York State Senate; 2nd District; 1860–1861	Succeeded by Jesse C. Smith
