= USS Murphy (DD-603) =

Benson-class destroyer

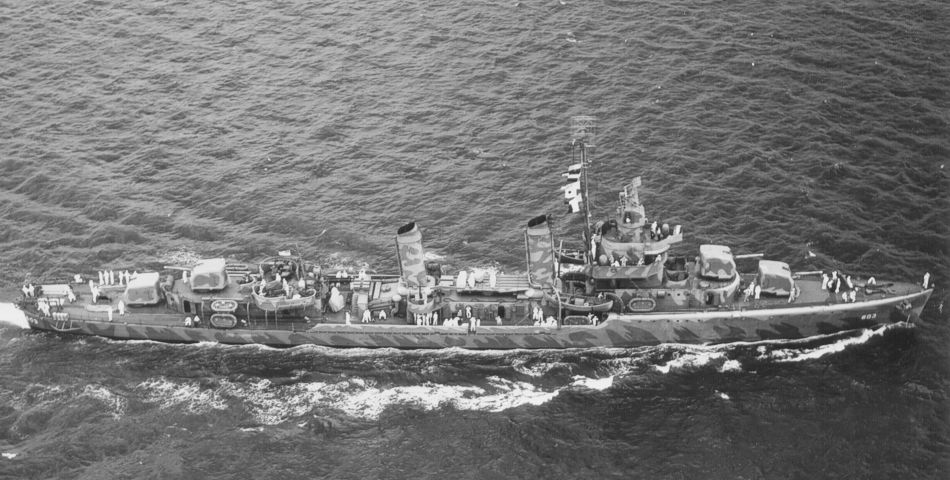
- USS Murphy

History

United States
- Name: USS Murphy
- Namesake: John McLeod Murphy
- Builder: Bethlehem Mariners Harbor, Staten Island
- Laid down: 19 May 1941
- Launched: 29 April 1942
- Commissioned: 25 July 1942
- Decommissioned: 9 March 1946
- Stricken: 1 November 1970
- Identification: DD-603
- Fate: Sold for scrap, October 1972

General characteristics
- Class & type: Benson-class destroyer
- Displacement: 1,620 tons
- Length: 348 ft 4 in (106.17 m)
- Beam: 36 ft 1 in (11.00 m)
- Draft: 17 ft 4 in (5.28 m)
- Speed: 37 knots (69 km/h; 43 mph)
- Complement: 265
- Armament: 4 x 5 in (130 mm) guns; 40 mm guns; 5 x 21 inch (533 mm) torpedo tubes; 4 depth charge throwers

USS Murphy (DD-603) was a Benson-class destroyer in the United States Navy during World War II. She was named for Lieutenant John McLeod Murphy.

Murphy's keel was laid down 19 May 1941 by Bethlehem Steel Corporation at their shipyard in Staten Island, New York. The destroyer was launched on 29 April 1942, sponsored by Miss M. Elsie Murphy, daughter of Lieutenant Murphy. The vessel was commissioned on 25 July 1942.

== Operational history ==
Following shakedown to Casco Bay, Maine, and escort duty off Halifax, Nova Scotia, Murphy joined the Center Attack Group, Western Naval Task Force, at Norfolk, Virginia, sailing in late October for Fedhala, Morocco, to participate in Operation Torch, the invasion of North Africa. Arriving off the landing beaches 7 November, the destroyer regulated the waves of landing craft hitting the beach the next day, then gave fire support off Point Blondin at which time the ship was hit in the after engine room during a furious exchange of fire with the Sherkhi battery, losing three men killed and 25 wounded. Immediate damage control measures prevented any serious damage and Murphy's crew effected repairs in time to join other fire support ships in silencing the Cape Blondin guns. Murphy remained off Fedhala through the Naval Battle of Casablanca, driving off an air attack 9 November, until sailing for Boston to complete repairs, arriving on the 24th.

The destroyer next escorted convoys between New York and Panama, and Norfolk and Casablanca, until joining the "Dime" attack force screen for the Amphibious Battle of Gela, Sicily, in July 1943, "Operation Husky". On 10 July, while engaged in patrolling the beachhead, Murphy was straddled by near misses from a night air attack, puncturing her stern and wounding one man. She was again attacked two nights later, being missed by 100 yards (91 m) by a German dive bomber, but continued her fire support off Sicily into August. Then, while escorting a group of transports to Palermo, she was once again attacked by dive bombers; but this time she downed two planes.

=== Partial sinking and repair ===
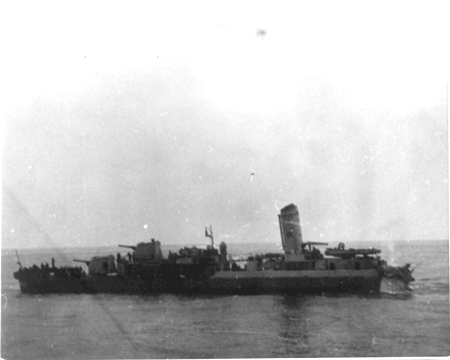
Stern section of USS Murphy after the collision.

Murphy returned to the United States following the end of the invasion of Sicily, next escorting United Kingdom bound convoys. Heading out of New York Harbor 21 October 1943, the destroyer, in a convoy (17 cargo freighters, 7 destroyers, and 2 battleships) was struck on the port side between the bridge and forward stack by the oil tanker SS Bulkoil, 75 miles (121 km) off the coast of New Jersey. The forward third of the ship sank in 265 feet (81 m) of water, taking 35 officers and men with it. The aft two-thirds was kept afloat and was towed into New York Navy Yard for seven months of repairs, which included the replacement of the entire bow. This accident and the subsequent discovery of the exact location of the lost bow section, almost 60 years later, were the basis for the History Channel Deep Sea Detectives "Destroyer Down" episode (Season 2 episode 6, Aired on 05/18/2004).

=== Normandy Invasion ===
The veteran warship rejoined the fleet in time for the Normandy invasion. On 5 June 1944, Murphy departed Portland, England, assigned to the assault area off Vierville, France, better known as Omaha Beach. She remained there, giving fire support and conducting screen duty for the transports through mid-June, engaging in a gun duel with shore batteries 8 June, and repelling numerous German U-boat and torpedo attacks.

In July, Murphy steamed south to the Mediterranean, operating with Task Force 88, the Aircraft Carrier Force in "Operation Dragoon", the invasion of southern France. She conducted fire support, plane guard, and screening duties during the landings and then departed for New York for overhaul in early September.

=== Saudi Arabia ===
The destroyer resumed operations in late 1944, joining Quincy at Norfolk to escort that ship carrying President Franklin D. Roosevelt to the Malta and Great Bitter Lake, Egypt, Conferences. Upon arrival at Great Bitter Lake, Murphy was detached and ordered to Jidda, Arabia, to transport King Ibn Saud of Saudi Arabia and his party to the Conference. After transiting the Suez Canal, Murphy became the first United States warship to enter the harbor of Jidda. Murphy anchored on 11 February, and the royal party came aboard the next day. King Ibn Saud had not previously left his country and had never previously traveled by ship. A large canvas tent was constructed over the forecastle to accommodate the King's entourage of 48 and rugs were laid over all weather decks for the King to walk upon. A corral was built between the depth charge racks on the stern to hold sheep to be slaughtered for the King's meals. The destroyer got underway immediately with her valuable cargo settled in a tent on her forecastle and arrived Great Bitter Lake on the 15th. With her passengers disembarked, the warship then sailed for New York for a minor yard period, joined an antisubmarine "killer" group on duty off New England and Nova Scotia, and then in May escorted one of the last convoys to Oran, Algeria, and back. On 2 June 1945, with war in the Atlantic won, Murphy entered the Boston Navy Yard for refit prior to assignment to the Pacific Fleet.

=== Later Career and Decommissioning ===
The veteran warship departed Boston 10 July, steamed via the Panama Canal to the west coast, and then on to Okinawa, arriving 9 September. Being assigned to the 5th Fleet on occupation duty in southern Japanese waters, she visited Nagasaki, Yokosuka, Wakayama, and Nagoya until departing Okinawa 21 November for the United States. She steamed via Saipan, Pearl Harbor, San Diego, and the Panama Canal, arriving at Charleston, South Carolina to prepare for inactivation. She decommissioned there 9 March 1946, and joined the Charleston Group, Atlantic Reserve Fleet. She was struck 1 November 1970, and sold for scrap 6 October 1972.

== Awards ==
Murphy received four battle stars for World War II service.

== External links or references ==
- Quest for Sunken Warships : "USS Murphy", 2007, documentary video, Military Channel, last aired 30 September 2010, 3–4 pm MDT.
