= David H. Abell =

American politician

David H. Abell (c. 1807 – March 1872 Groveland, Livingston County, New York) was an American politician from New York.

== Life ==
Abell was a New York State Canal Appraiser from 1848 to 1850; and a member of the New York State Senate (30th D.) in 1860 and 1861. In January 1869, he was appointed by President Andrew Johnson as U.S. Tax Assessor for the 25th District of New York.

== Sources ==
- The New York Civil List compiled by Franklin Benjamin Hough, Stephen C. Hutchins and Edgar Albert Werner (1867; pg. 407 and 442)
- Biographical Sketches of the State Officers and Members of the Legislature of the State of New York by William D. Murphy (1861; pg. 34ff)
- WASHINGTON; ...NOMINATIONS BY THE PRESIDENT in NYT on January 13, 1869
- Obit in the Corning Journal on March 21, 1872

New York State Senate
Preceded by John B. Halsted	New York State Senate; 30th District; 1860–1861	Succeeded by Wilkes Angel
