= Alexander H. Bailey =

American politician and judge

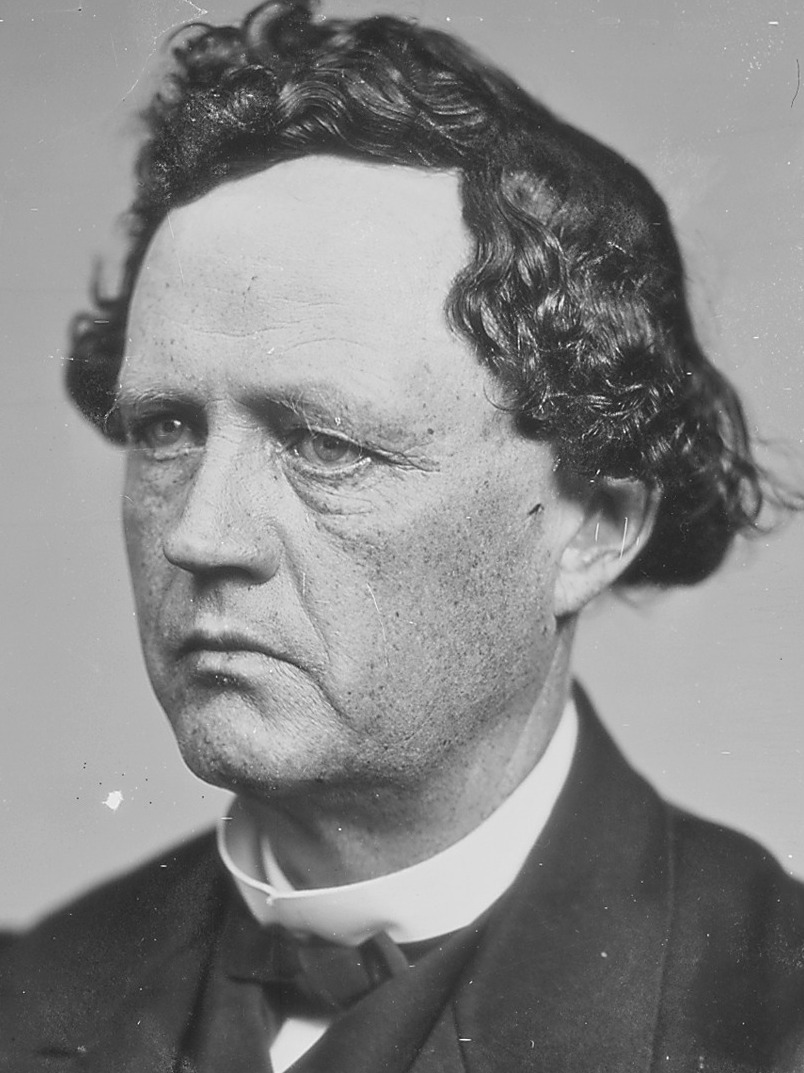
- Bailey, c. 1860-65

Member of the U.S. House of Representatives from New York's 21st district
- In office November 30, 1867 – March 3, 1871
- Preceded by: Roscoe Conkling
- Succeeded by: Ellis H. Roberts

Member of the New York Senate from the 19th district
- In office January 1, 1862 – December 31, 1865
- Preceded by: William H. Ferry
- Succeeded by: Samuel Campbell

Member of the New York State Assembly from the Greene County, 1st district
- In office January 1, 1849 – December 31, 1849
- Preceded by: Alexander H. Palmer
- Succeeded by: Alonzo Greene

Personal details
- Born: Alexander Hamilton Bailey; August 14, 1817 Minisink, New York, U.S.
- Died: April 20, 1874 (aged 56) Rome, New York, U.S.
- Party: Republican
- Profession: lawyer; politician; judge

Alexander Hamilton Bailey (August 14, 1817 – April 20, 1874) was an American politician, a United States representative and judge from New York.

== Biography ==
Bailey was born in Minisink, New York, Orange County, New York on August 14, 1817. He graduated from Princeton College in 1837, where he studied law; was admitted to the bar and commenced practice of law.

== Career ==
Bailey was examiner in chancery of Greene County from 1840 to 1842, and a Justice of the Peace of Catskill for four years. He was a member of the New York State Assembly (representing Greene County) in 1849, and Judge of Greene County Court from 1851 to 1855. Bailey moved to Rome, New York in 1856 and continued his law practice. He was a member of the New York State Senate from 1862 to 1865, sitting in the 85th, 86th, 87th and 88th New York State Legislatures.

Elected as a Republican to the United States House of Representatives for the fortieth Congress, to fill the vacancy left by the resignation of Roscoe Conkling. He was re-elected to the forty-first Congress, holding office from November 30, 1867, to March 3, 1871. During that time, he was Chairman of the Committee on Expenditures in the Department of State.

Not a candidate for renomination in 1870, Bailey was elected judge of the Oneida County Court in 1871. He remained on the bench until his death.

== Death ==
Bailey died in Rome, Oneida County, New York, on April 20, 1874. He is interred at Rome Cemetery, Rome, New York.

New York State Assembly
| Preceded by Alexander H. Palmer | New York State Assembly; Greene County, 1st District; 1849 | Succeeded by Alonzo Greene |
New York State Senate
| Preceded by William H. Ferry | New York State Senate; 19th District; 1862–1865 | Succeeded by Samuel Campbell |
U.S. House of Representatives
| Preceded by Roscoe Conkling | Member of the U.S. House of Representatives from New York's 21st congressional district 1867–1871 | Succeeded by Ellis H. Roberts |
