= Franklin Tuthill =

American politician

Dr. Franklin Tuthill (April 3, 1822 – August 27, 1865) was an American medical doctor, newspaper editor, and politician.

== Life ==
Tuthill was born on April 3, 1822, in Wading River, New York, the son of Nathaniel Tuthill and Clarissa Miller. His brother was lawyer, assemblyman, and judge James H. Tuthill.

Tuthill graduated from Amherst College with an A.B. in 1840 and an A.M. in 1843. He received an M.D. from New York University. He practiced medicine in Southold from 1844 to 1851.

Tuthill served as town superintendent for five years. In 1850, he was elected to the New York State Assembly as a Whig, representing the Suffolk County 1st District. He served in the Assembly in 1851. He returned to the Assembly in 1859, representing the Kings County 7th District as a Democrat.

In 1851, Tuthill moved to New York City, where practiced medicine for about a year. He then began working as city news editor of The New York Times under H. J. Raymond. In 1859, he moved to San Francisco, where he worked as an editor for the San Francisco Evening Bulletin. He bought an interest in the newspaper in 1862. He also began writing The History of California, which covered California's history from its discovery to the Civil War. He finished writing the preface and reading the proof sheets less than a week before he died.

In 1847, Tuthill married Emma Harriet Horton. Their daughter was Anna Elizabeth, who married William Redin Woodward. He was a Presbyterian and was a lay representative of the Long Island Presbytery in two General Assemblies.

Tuthill died in Brooklyn on August 27, 1865, a few weeks after returning to America from a European trip he took for health reasons. He was buried in the Old Burying Ground of the First Presbyterian Church in Southold.

New York State Assembly
| Preceded by David Pierson | New York State Assembly; Suffolk County, 1st District; 1851 | Succeeded by Henry P. Hedges |
| Preceded by George W. Bleecker | New York State Assembly; Kings County, 7th District; 1859 | Succeeded by George H. Fisher |
