= Wells S. Dickinson =

American politician

Wells Stoughton Dickinson (August 16, 1828 Bangor, Franklin County, New York – January 19, 1892 Malone, Franklin Co., NY) was an American merchant, manufacturer and politician from New York.

== Life ==
He was the son of Joshua Dickinson. He attended the common schools and Franklin Academy, and eventually he became a merchant. In 1851, he married Thusa Fish. He manufactured potato starch, and owned sawmills and gristmills.

He was a Supervisor of the Town of Bangor in from 1857 to 1859, a member of the New York State Assembly (Franklin Co.) in 1860, a delegate to the 1864 Republican National Convention, and a member of the New York State Senate (17th D.) from 1872 to 1875, sitting in the 95th, 96th, 97th and 98th New York State Legislatures.

Afterwards, he was the agent of the Northern Pacific Railway in charge of marketing the company's lands and building towns in the Dakota Territory.

Dickinson, North Dakota, was named after him.

== Sources ==
- Life Sketches of Executive Officers and Members of the Legislature of the State of New York by William H. McElroy & Alexander McBride (1873; pg. 65ff) [e-book]
- Main Street, North Dakota in Vintage Postcards by Geneva Roth Olstad (Arcadia Publishing, 2000; pg. 27)
- Bio transcribed from Historical Sketches of Franklin County by Frederick J. Seaver (1918)

New York State Assembly
Preceded by Martin L. Parlin	New York State Assembly; Franklin County; 1860	Succeeded by William Andrus
New York State Senate
Preceded by Abraham X. Parker	New York State Senate; 17th District; 1872–1875	Succeeded by Darius A. Moore
