= Richard K. Sanford =

American politician (1822–1895)

Richard K. Sanford (July 25, 1822 – April 24, 1895) was an American newspaper editor and politician from New York.

== Life ==
He was born in Volney, New York, the son of Kingsbury E. Sanford. He graduated from Hamilton College in 1843. Then he taught school, and was in charge of Middlebury Academy and other schools, until 1855. In 1848, he married Lucy A. Carrier (d. 1859), and they had two children.

In 1856, he became the owner and editor of the Fulton Patriot and Gazette.

He was a member of the New York State Assembly (Oswego Co., 2nd D.) in 1861; of the New York State Senate (21st D.) in 1862 and 1863; and again of the State Assembly in 1865.

He was for 25 years a clerk in the Auditor's office of the New York Customs House, and died of "apoplexy" at his home at 394 State Street, in Brooklyn.

== Sources ==
- The New York Civil List compiled by Franklin Benjamin Hough, Stephen C. Hutchins and Edgar Albert Werner (1870; pg. 443, 494 and 503)
- Biographical Sketches of the State Officers and the Members of the Legislature of the State of New York in 1862 and '63 by William D. Murphy (1863; pg. 105ff)
- THE OBITUARY RECORD; Richard K. Sanford in NYT on April 25, 1895

New York State Assembly
Preceded by William H. Carter	New York State Assembly; Oswego County, 2nd District; 1861	Succeeded by Willard Johnson
Preceded by Hiram W. Loomis	New York State Assembly; Oswego County, 2nd District; 1865	Succeeded by William H. Rice
New York State Senate
Preceded by Andrew S. Warner	New York State Senate; 21st District; 1862–1863	Succeeded by Cheney Ames
