= Hezekiah D. Robertson =

American politician

Hezekiah D. Robertson (December 15, 1826 Bedford, Westchester County, New York - September 19, 1870) was an American farmer, merchant and politician from New York.

== Life ==
He was the son of Lawrence Robertson (1791–1848) and Sally (Dykeman) Robertson (1792–1848). After the death of his parents he became a farmer in Pound Ridge, and was School Commissioner and Supervisor of this town. In 1853, he returned to Bedford, and became a merchant. He was Supervisor of the Town of Bedford in 1855, from 1858 to 1861, and from 1865 to 1870.

He entered politics as a Whig, then joined the American Party, and in 1858 became a Republican.

He was a member of the New York State Senate (8th D.) from 1860 to 1863, sitting in the 83rd, 84th, 85th and 86th New York State Legislatures. In 1861, he married Sarah C. Butler.

He died at his home in Bedford of "typhoid pneumonia" and was buried at the Union Cemetery in Bedford.

Congressman William H. Robertson (1823–1898) was his cousin.

== Sources ==
- The New York Civil List compiled by Franklin Benjamin Hough, Stephen C. Hutchins and Edgar Albert Werner (1867; pg. 442)
- Biographical Sketches of the State Officers and Members of the Legislature of the State of New York by William D. Murphy (1861; pg. 108ff)
- Short bio and portrait at Correction History
- OBITUARY; HEZEKIAH D. ROBERTSON... in NYT on September 20, 1870

New York State Senate
Preceded by Benjamin Brandreth	New York State Senate; 8th District; 1860–1863	Succeeded by Saxton Smith
