= John McLeod Murphy =

American politician

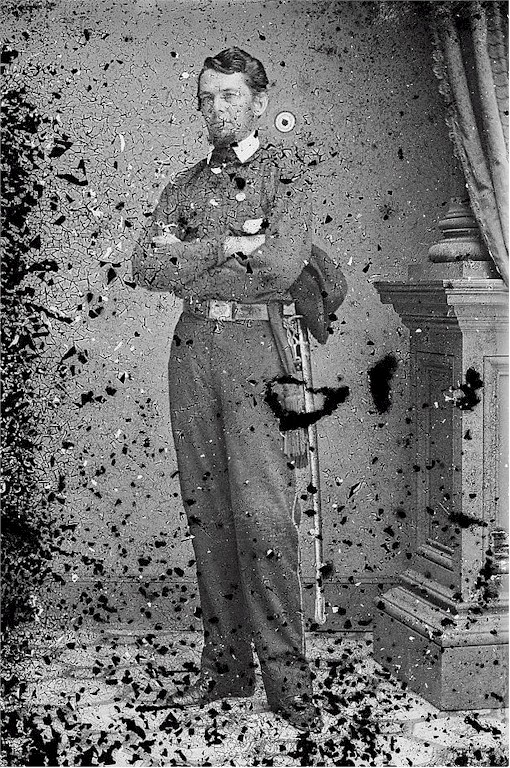
- John McLeod Murphy, c. 1862 as Col. of the 15th New York Regiment of Engineers
- Born: February 14, 1827; Westchester County, New York
- Died: June 1, 1871 (aged 44); New York City, New York
- Resting place: Calvary Cemetery

John McLeod Murphy (February 14, 1827 – June 1, 1871) was an officer in the United States Navy during the American Civil War.

== Biography ==
Murphy was born in Westchester County, New York, and was appointed midshipman on August 10, 1841. He served during the War with Mexico at Vera Cruz and Tabasco on board the USS Stromboli. He resigned as a passed midshipman on May 10, 1852, after his last mission as an assistant on John G. Barnard's survey of the Isthmus of Tehuantepec. He went into the private sector, working as a first officer on the Collins' line of steamships, a city surveyor for the city of New York, Chief Engineer of the Brooklyn Navy Yard, and lastly as a member of the New York State Senate (4th D.) in 1860 and 1861.

=== American Civil War ===
Murphy reentered service at the beginning of the Civil War as a colonel in the engineers, forming the 15th New York Regiment of Engineers, serving in the Army of the Potomac. He was appointed acting lieutenant of the U.S. Navy on December 4, 1862, taking many veterans of his regiment along with fresh volunteers from New York. He took command of gunboat Carondelet on March 4, 1863, skippering that ship during the joint Army‑Navy Expedition in Steele's Bayou under Rear Admiral David Dixon Porter from March 18 to March 24, in which he landed with two boat howitzers and 300 men near Rolling Fork to hold that place until the Union ships could cover it with their guns. One of his officers was Acting Volunteer Lieutenant Julius H. Kroehl.

He next took Carondelet off Vicksburg, Mississippi engaging batteries at that Confederate fortress many times from May 18 to July 3, being commended by Admiral Porter for energetic attention to orders and ready cooperation with Army corps commanders assaulting the fortress. Acting Lieutenant Murphy relinquished command of the gunboat on September 1, 1863, to serve as a recruiter in New York and resigned his commission on July 30, 1864. Attempts to re-enter politic office were unsuccessful.

== Personal ==
He was the son of Thomas and Maria (née Warner) Murphy, and the brother of Augustus Howard Murphy and William Jay Murphy, both of whom were Sandy Hook pilots. He married Mary Theresa Mooney in 1848; the couple had at least six children: Walter M., Maria B., Mary Theresa, Joseph D., John K., and Mary Elsie.

== Death ==
He died in New York City on June 1, 1871, and is interred at Calvary Cemetery in Queens, New York.

He should not be confused with his nephew, John McLeod Murphy (1858–1919), who served as a New York City fireman and patented the third-rail safety system for electric trolleys.

== Namesake ==
USS Murphy (DD-603) was named for him.

New York State Senate
Preceded by John C. Mather	New York State Senate; 4th District; 1860–1861	Succeeded by Christian B. Woodruff
