= Ephraim Goss =

American lawyer and politician

Ephraim Goss (June 12, 1806 – July 27, 1877) was an American lawyer and politician from New York.

== Life ==
He was the son of John Goss (c.1768–1848) and Mary (Lamont) Goss (c.1767–1844). He was born in that part of the Town of Middleburgh which was separated in 1828 as the Town of Fulton, in Schoharie County, New York. He studied law, was admitted to the bar in 1831, and practiced in Pittsford. On November 13, 1832, he married Margaret Porter (1814–1896), and they had several children, among them Assemblyman George A. Goss (born 1834).

He was a Justice of the Peace; a colonel of the State Militia; Supervisor of the Town of Pittsford for several terms; Clerk of Monroe County from 1838 to 1840; and a member of the New York State Senate (28th D.) in 1860 and 1861.

He was buried at the Pittsford Cemetery.

== Sources ==
- The New York Civil List compiled by Franklin Benjamin Hough, Stephen C. Hutchins and Edgar Albert Werner (1867; pg. 364 and 442)
- Biographical Sketches of the State Officers and Members of the Legislature of the State of New York by William D. Murphy (1861; pg. 56ff)

New York State Senate
Preceded by John E. Paterson	New York State Senate; 28th District; 1860–1861	Succeeded by Lysander Farrar
