= George Miller (New York politician) =

American politician

County Judge of Suffolk County
- In office 1857–1857
- Preceded by: Abraham T. Rose
- Succeeded by: J. Lawrence Smith

Member of the New York State Assembly from Suffolk County, 1st District
- In office 1854–1854
- Preceded by: Abraham H. Gardiner
- Succeeded by: John E. Chester

Personal details
- Born: March 16, 1799 Miller Place, New York, U.S.
- Died: October 27, 1883 (aged 84)
- Spouse: Eliza Leonard

George Miller (March 16, 1799 – October 27, 1883) was an American lawyer, politician, and judge from New York.

== Life ==
Miller was born on March 16, 1799, in Miller Place, New York, the son of Timothy Miller and Mehetabel Brown.

Miller attended the Clinton Academy in East Hampton. He initially studied law under Selah B. Strong, later with Caleb S. Woodhull of New York City. In 1825, he moved to Riverhead and opened a law office there. He later took James H. Tuthill as a law partner. He and a few associates purchased an entire township of valuable timberland in Maine, which turned out to involve defective titles and led to a number of suits. He was also involved in a long contest with New York City Griswold merchants over the ownership of some lots in the Brooklyn Atlantic Dock.

In 1840, Miller was appointed Surrogate of Suffolk County. He was a supporter of the Maine law. In 1853, he was elected to the New York State Assembly as a Whig, representing the Suffolk County 1st District. He served in the Assembly in 1854, introducing a bill that would incorporate the Riverhead Canal and Mill Company. In 1857, he was appointed County Judge and Surrogate following the resignation of Abraham T. Rose. He lost the election for the position later that year to J. Lawrence Smith. He became district attorney of Suffolk County in 1858, and in the election that he ran as a Republican and won.

Miller supported and helped establish the Congregational Church in Riverhead. In around 1836, he married Eliza Leonard of Massachusetts, who worked as a teacher in Riverhead Academy for many years.

Miller died on October 27, 1883, twenty days after his wife. He was buried in Riverhead Cemetery.

New York State Assembly
Preceded by Abraham H. Gardiner	New York State Assembly; Suffolk County, 1st District; 1854	Succeeded by John E. Chester
