= George H. Fisher =

American politician

George Huntington Fisher
- Born: May 7, 1832; Oswego, New York, US
- Died: February 6, 1910 (aged 77); New York City, US
- Resting place: Cypress Hills Cemetery
- Education: Johnson & Sessions; Harvard College; Hopkins Classical School (1847); Mr. Goodnow's School, Concord (1845)
- Occupations: lawyer politician
- Spouses: Katharine Weeks (m. 1889) Emma Chichester (m. 1857; died 1888)
- Children: 1

George Huntington Fisher (May 7, 1832 – February 6, 1910) was an American lawyer and politician from New York.

== Life ==
Fisher was born on May 7, 1832, in Oswego, New York, the son of George Fisher and Elizabeth Porter Huntington. His father was a congressman, and his mother was the elder sister of Bishop Frederic Dan Huntington.

Fisher's father moved the family to Northampton, Massachusetts, in 1836 to provide a better education for the children. Three years later, the family moved to France, living first in Paris, then in Passy, and finally in Tours in 1840. Fisher attended school there and other French towns until 1844, when the family returned to Northampton. In 1845, he went to Mr. Goodnow's school in Concord, and in 1847 he attended Hopkins Classical School under Edmund Burke Whitman in Cambridge. He then Harvard College, graduating from there in 1852. He was a member of the Harvard Natural History Society and the Hasty Pudding Club.

After graduating, Fisher studied law in the law office of Johnson & Sessions in Syracuse. He was admitted to the state bar in 1854, and in 1855 he began practicing law in New York City and Brooklyn, residing in the latter city. He was initially the senior partner of the law firm Fisher, Denly and Provost, but a year later he began practicing with James Maurice He was also Register in Bankruptcy, part owner of the Brooklyn Times, and served as director and counselor of the Hospital and Charities Institutions and the Industrial School Association of Brooklyn. He was involved other law partnerships over the years, the last one being Fisher and Voltz. He was also a director of the Broadway Savings Bank, the German Savings Bank, and the Manufacturer's National Bank of Brooklyn.

Fisher served as Notary Public. In 1859, he was elected to the New York State Assembly as a Republican, representing the Kings County 7th District. He served in the Assembly in 1860 and 1861. While in the Assembly, he wrote a bill that gave resident aliens the right to acquire, hold, and convey real estate. He also served as Brooklyn alderman, and was a member and president of the Brooklyn Common Council, a town supervisor, a member of the board of education, and a park commissioner.

In 1857, Fisher married Emma Chichester. Their son, George Chichester, was a newspaperman in San Francisco. Emma died in 1888, and a year later Fisher married Katharine Weeks of East Norwich. He was a member of the Universalist Church.

Fisher died of pneumonia at his home in Hotel St. George on February 6, 1910. He was buried in Cypress Hills Cemetery.

New York State Assembly
Preceded by Franklin Tuthill	New York State Assembly; Kings County, 7th District; 1860-1861	Succeeded by Edgar McMullen
