= William H. Ferry =

American politician

William Henry Ferry (April 1819 – March 26, 1880) was an American politician from New York.

== Life ==
He was born in April 1819 in Remsen, New York, the son of Heman Ferry (1786–1856) and Roxanna (Burchard) Ferry (c.1796–1842). He attended Amherst College for some time. He married Mary Ann Williams (b. 1816), and they had seven children.

He was a member of the New York State Senate (19th D.) in 1860 and 1861. On March 25, 1861, he was elected President pro tempore of the State Senate.

He was a director of the Galena and Chicago Union Railroad.

He died on March 26, 1880, in Lake Forest, Illinois, and was buried at the Rosehill Cemetery and Mausoleum in Chicago.

== Sources ==
- The New York Civil List compiled by Franklin Benjamin Hough, Stephen C. Hutchins and Edgar Albert Werner (1867; pg. 442)
- Biographical Sketches of the State Officers and Members of the Legislature of the State of New York by William D. Murphy (1861; pg. 50ff)
- Ferry genealogy at Genealogy.com
- 14th Annual Report of the Directors of the Galena & Chicago Union Raiulroad (1861; pg. 7)

New York State Senate
Preceded by Alrick Hubbell	New York State Senate; 19th District; 1860–1861	Succeeded by Alexander H. Bailey
