= Elbridge G. Lapham =

American politician (1814–1890)

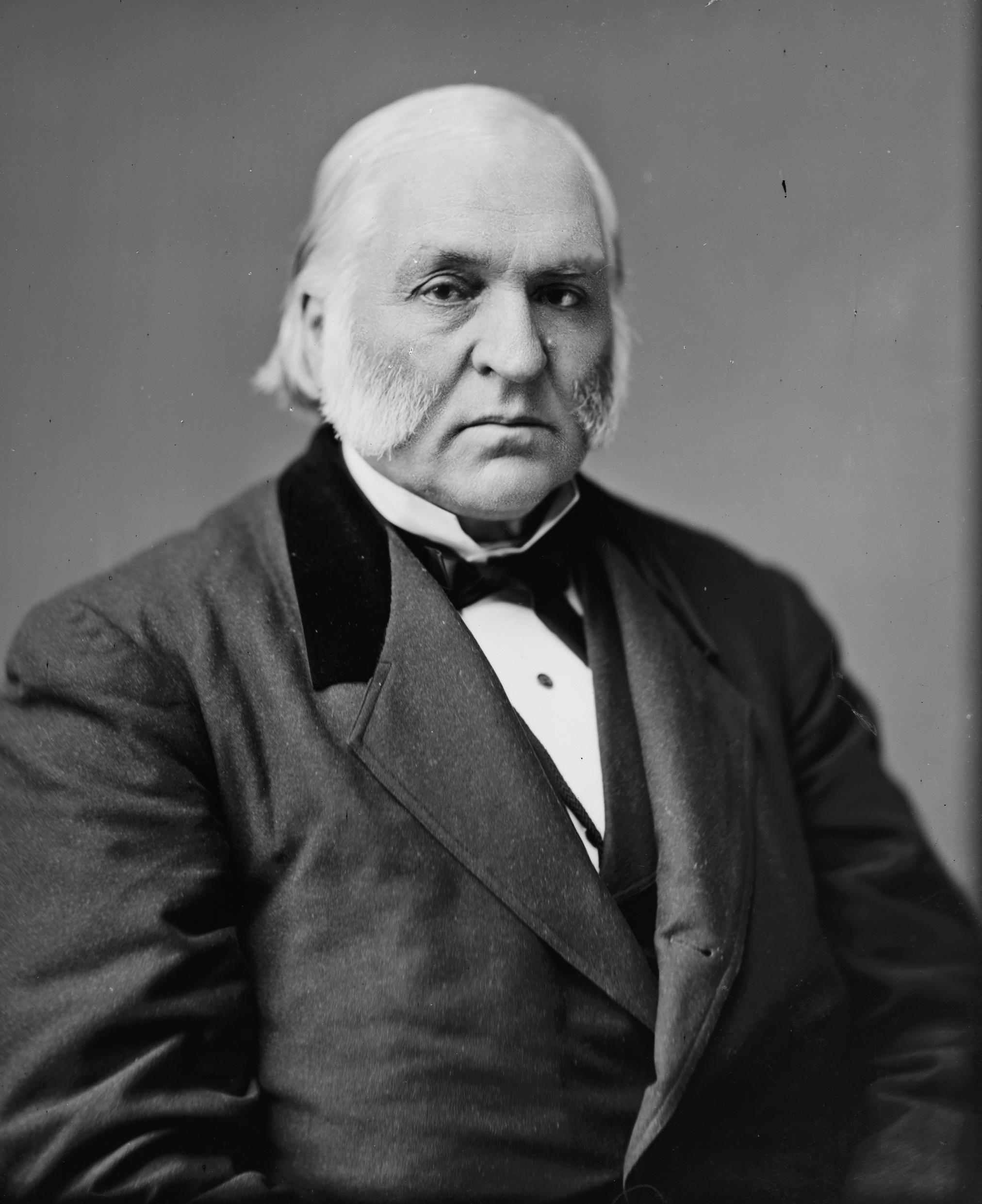
- Lapham, 1865–1880

United States Senator from New York
- In office August 2, 1881 – March 4, 1885
- Preceded by: Roscoe Conkling
- Succeeded by: William M. Evarts

Member of the U.S. House of Representatives from New York's 27th district
- In office March 4, 1875 – July 29, 1881
- Preceded by: Thomas C. Platt
- Succeeded by: James Wolcott Wadsworth

Personal details
- Born: October 18, 1814 Farmington, New York
- Died: January 8, 1890 (aged 75) Canandaigua, New York
- Party: Republican
- Profession: Politician, Lawyer

Elbridge Gerry Lapham (October 18, 1814 – January 8, 1890) was a Republican politician who represented New York in both the U.S. House of Representatives from 1875–1881 and the United States Senate from 1881–1885.

== Life ==
Lapham attended the public schools and the Canandaigua Academy. He studied civil engineering and law and was admitted to the bar in 1844 and practiced in Canandaigua, New York.

He was a delegate to the New York State Constitutional Convention of 1867-68. He was elected as a Republican to the 44th, 45th, 46th and 47th United States Congresses, holding office from March 4, 1875, to July 29, 1881, when he resigned after his election to the U.S. Senate. He was one of the managers appointed by the House of Representatives in 1876 to conduct the impeachment proceedings against ex-U.S. Secretary of War William W. Belknap.

He was elected as a Republican to the United States Senate on July 22, 1881, to fill the vacancy caused by the resignation of Roscoe Conkling and served to March 4, 1885. He was not a candidate for re-election. He was Chairman of the U.S. Senate Committee on Fish and Fisheries (48th Congress).

Afterwards he resumed the practice of law in Canandaigua. He died at “Glen Gerry,” on Canandaigua Lake, on January 8, 1890, and was buried at the Woodlawn Cemetery in Canandaigua.

== Personal life ==
Lapham is the son of Judge John Lapham (1793–1860) and his wife, Zimroda Smith Lapham (1793–1879). He is a descendant of John Lapham (1677–1734) and his wife, Mary Russell Lapham (1683–1752). His cousins include Nathan Lapham, Christopher Lloyd and Susan B. Anthony.

On July 2, 1844, in Clifton Springs, New York, he married Jane Frances McBride (1825–1907). They had at least eight children:

1. Charlotte Lapham (1845-1910)
2. Ellen Frances Lapham (1850-1926)
3. Benjamin Franklin Lapham (1852-1907)
4. Charles Barnard Lapham (1854-1901)
5. Henry Wager Lapham (1857-1938)
6. Joanna Louise Lapham (1860-1860)
7. John R. Lapham (1862-1888)
8. Elbridge Gerry Lapham Jr. (1866-1921)

U.S. House of Representatives
Preceded by Thomas C. Platt	Member of the U.S. House of Representatives from New York's 27th congressional district 1875–1881	Succeeded by James W. Wadsworth
U.S. Senate
Preceded by Roscoe Conkling	U.S. senator (Class 3) from New York; 1881–1885; Served alongside: Warner Miller	Succeeded by William M. Evarts
