= Thomas H. Reed =

Thomas Harrison Reed (July 29, 1881 – December 6, 1971) was a professor of Political Science at The University of Michigan from 1922 until 1936 and was the Director of Studies for the Republican Program Committee from 1938 to 1939.

He also served as the first city manager of San Jose, CA from July 1916 to October 1918 and was forced to contend with the Knights of Liberty vigilante group after the tarring and feathering of George Koetzer.
