= Donald Douglas Shaw =

American politician

Donald Douglas Shaw (June 25, 1834 – December 29, 1859) was an American politician.

He was born on June 25, 1834, in Hamden, Delaware County, New York, the son of Donald Shaw.

He graduated from Yale College in 1856. He studied law in Albany, New York and in Delhi, New York.

In November 1859, he was elected a member of the New York State Assembly, but died on December 29, 1859, in Hamden, before the commencement of the session.
