= Andrew S. Warner =

American politician (1819–1887)

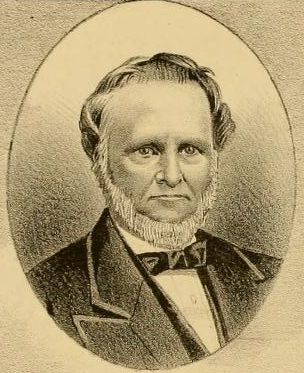
- Warner in 1877

Member of the New York State Senate from the 21st district
- In office January 1, 1860 – December 31, 1861
- Preceded by: Cheney Ames
- Succeeded by: Richard K. Sanford

Member of the New York State Assembly from the Oswego County 2nd district
- In office January 1, 1855 – December 31, 1856
- Preceded by: Jacob M. Selden
- Succeeded by: Leonard Ames

Personal details
- Born: Andrew Sylvester Warner; January 12, 1819 Vernon, New York, U.S.
- Died: December 26, 1887 (aged 68) Sandy Creek, New York, U.S.
- Resting place: Woodlawn Cemetery, Sandy Creek, New York, U.S.
- Party: Independent
- Other political affiliations: Republican; Free Soil
- Spouse(s): Mary Elizabeth Greene (m. 1842; died 1859) Chloe Monroe (m. 1861)
- Children: 3
- Occupation: Politician

Andrew Sylvester Warner (January 12, 1819 – December 26, 1887) was an American politician from New York.

== Life ==
He was born on January 12, 1819, in Vernon, Oneida County, New York, the son of Andrew Warner (c.1791–1843) and Elizabeth C. (Young) Warner (b. c.1796). In 1837, the family removed to a farm in Sandy Creek, in Oswego County. On October 19, 1842, he married Mary Elizabeth Greene (d. 1859), and they had two sons.

He was a Free Soiler in 1848, and joined the Republican Party upon its foundation. He was a member of the New York State Assembly (Oswego Co., 2nd D.) in 1855 and 1856; and of the New York State Senate (21st D.) in 1860 and 1861.

On October 3, 1861, he married Chloe Monroe (1840–1916), and their son was Wilbert Charles Warner MD (1864–1927). He fought in the American Civil War attaining the rank of colonel, but contracted typhoid fever and was discharged.

In 1874, he ran as an independent for Congress in the 24th District, but was defeated by Republican William H. Baker.

He died on December 26, 1887, in Sandy Creek, New York; and was buried at the Woodlawn Cemetery there.

== Sources ==
- The New York Civil List compiled by Franklin Benjamin Hough, Stephen C. Hutchins and Edgar Albert Werner (1867; pg. 442, 480 and 482)
- Biographical Sketches of the State Officers and Members of the Legislature of the State of New York by William D. Murphy (1861; pg. 124ff)
- Obit and portrait at Local History, Morrisville

New York State Assembly
Preceded by Jacob M. Selden	New York State Assembly; Oswego County, 2nd District; 1855–1856	Succeeded by Leonard Ames
New York State Senate
Preceded by Cheney Ames	New York State Senate; 21st District; 1860–1861	Succeeded by Richard K. Sanford
