= Nathan Lapham =

American politician

Nathan Lapham (November 24, 1820 Collins, Erie County, New York – May 1, 1890 Peru, Clinton County, New York) was an American politician from New York.

== Life ==
He was the son of Joseph Lapham (1786–1851) and Anna (Keese) Lapham (1790–1833). In 1822, the family removed to Peru. On February 22, 1842, he married Jane R. Barker (1822–1869), and they had several children.

He was a member of the New York State Senate (16th D.) in 1860 and 1861. On January 25, 1860, he was elected President pro tempore of the State Senate (83rd Session).

From 1860-1861, Senator Nathan Lapham resided in his home (the Nathan Lapham Home) in Peru, New York where he was part of the Underground Railroad feeding and sheltering fugitive slaves escaping to Canada. An Historic Marker was erected in 2010 by the Town of Peru at his then homesite.

Later he married Hannah Barker, a niece of his first wife, and they had several children.

He was buried at the Quaker Cemetery in Au Sable, New York.

Lapham is a descendant of John Lapham (1677-1734) and his wife Mary Russell Lapham (1683-1752). His cousins through the Lapham family include Elbridge G. Lapham, a Congressman from New York, Roger D. Lapham, a mayor of San Francisco, California, Christopher Lloyd, an actor, and Susan B. Anthony, Women's Rights Activist.

== Sources ==
- The New York Civil List compiled by Franklin Benjamin Hough, Stephen C. Hutchins and Edgar Albert Werner (1867; pg. 442)
- Biographical Sketches of the State Officers and Members of the Legislature of the State of New York by William D. Murphy (1861; pg. 73ff)
- Book of Appendices to the History and Genealogy of the Ancestors and Some Descendants of Stukely Westcott, 1592-1677 by Roscoe Leighton Whitman & Jonathan Russell Bullock (1939; pg. 124)

New York State Senate
Preceded by Ralph A. Loveland	New York State Senate; 16th District; 1860–1861	Succeeded by Russell M. Little
