= 91st New York State Legislature =

New York state legislative session

←	90th	92nd	→
- The Old State Capitol (1879)

Overview
- Legislative body: New York State Legislature
- Jurisdiction: New York, United States
- Term: January 1 – December 31, 1868

Senate
- Members: 32
- President: Lt. Gov. Stewart L. Woodford (R)
- Temporary President: Charles J. Folger (R), from January 15
- Party control: Republican (17-15)

Assembly
- Members: 128
- Speaker: William Hitchman (D)
- Party control: Democratic (74-54)

Sessions
- 1st: January 7 – May 6, 1868

The 91st New York State Legislature, consisting of the New York State Senate and the New York State Assembly, met from January 7 to May 6, 1868, during the fourth year of Reuben E. Fenton's governorship, in Albany.

== Background ==
Under the provisions of the New York Constitution of 1846, 32 Senators and 128 assemblymen were elected in single-seat districts; senators for a two-year term, assemblymen for a one-year term. The senatorial districts were made up of entire counties, except New York County (five districts) and Kings County (two districts). The Assembly districts were made up of entire towns, or city wards, forming a contiguous area, all within the same county.

On April 25, 1866, the Legislature re-apportioned the Senate districts. The new apportionment was first used at the election of 1867.

According to the Constitution of 1846, twenty years after its elaboration the electorate was asked if they wanted a Constitutional Convention to be held, which was answered at the 1866 New York state election, in the affirmative. On April 23, 1867, the delegates to the Constitutional Convention were elected, resulting in a Republican majority. On June 4, the Constitutional Convention met at Albany; adjourned on September 23; and met again on November 12.

At this time, there were two major political parties: the Republican and the Democratic.

== Elections ==
The 1867 New York state election was held on November 5. All eight statewide elective offices up for election were carried by the Democrats. The approximate party strength at this election, as expressed by the vote for secretary of state, was: Democrats 373,000 and Republicans 325,000.

== Sessions ==
The Legislature met for the regular session at the Old State Capitol in Albany on January 7, 1868; and adjourned on May 6. At the same time, the Constitutional Convention continued in session.

William Hitchman (D) was elected speaker.

On January 15, Charles J. Folger (R) was re-elected president pro tempore of the State Senate.

On February 12, the Legislature elected Matthew T. Brennan (D) to take office on March 1 as a Metropolitan Police Commissioner, for a term of eight years.

On February 28, the Constitutional Convention adjourned sine die. How to put the proposed amendments before the electorate was then debated throughout this and the next Legislature, and all amendments, except the re-organization of the judicial system, were eventually rejected by the voters at the 1869 New York state election.

On March 31, the trial of Canal Commissioner Robert C. Dorn (R) opened before the New York Court for the Trial of Impeachments, consisting of the State Senate and the judges of the New York Court of Appeals. Assemblymen William S. Clark, John L. Flagg, John C. Jacobs, John F. Little, William Lounsbery, Alpheus Prince, William B. Quinn (all seven Dem.), Nicholas B. La Bau and Edmund L. Pitts (both Rep.) appeared as the Managers to prosecute the impeachment. Smith M. Weed (D) appeared as counsel for the managers. Henry Smith (R) and John H. Reynolds appeared for the defense.

On April 7, the Legislature elected Abram B. Weaver (D) to succeed Victor M. Rice (R) as superintendent of public instruction for a term of three years.

On April 9, Assemblyman Elijah M. K. Glenn (R) accused Assemblyman Alexander Frear to have offered him on March 27 a bribe of $500.

On April 10, a select committee appointed to investigate concluded that "the evidence does not furnish any justification for the charges made by Mr. Glenn against Mr. Frear." Thereupon a resolution was passed to censure Glenn.

On April 11, Glenn resigned his seat.

On June 12, the impeachment trial ended with the acquittal of Dorn on all articles.

== State Senate ==
=== Districts ===
- 1st District: Queens, Richmond and Suffolk counties
- 2nd District: 1st, 2nd, 3rd, 4th, 5th, 7th, 11th, 13th, 15th, 19th and 20th wards of the City of Brooklyn
- 3rd District: 6th, 8th, 9th, 10th, 12th, 14th, 16th, 17th and 18th wards of the City of Brooklyn; and all towns in Kings County
- 4th District: 1st, 2nd, 3rd, 4th, 5th, 6th, 7th, 13th and 14th wards of New York City
- 5th District: 8th, 9th, 15th and 16th wards of New York City
- 6th District: 10th, 11th and 17th wards of New York City
- 7th District: 18th, 20th and 21st wards of New York City
- 8th District: 12th, 19th and 22nd wards of New York City
- 9th District: Putnam, Rockland and Westchester counties
- 10th District: Orange and Sullivan counties
- 11th District: Columbia and Dutchess counties
- 12th District: Rensselaer and Washington counties
- 13th District: Albany County
- 14th District: Greene and Ulster counties
- 15th District: Fulton, Hamilton, Montgomery, Saratoga and Schenectady counties
- 16th District: Clinton, Essex and Warren counties
- 17th District: Franklin and St. Lawrence counties
- 18th District: Jefferson and Lewis counties
- 19th District: Oneida County
- 20th District: Herkimer and Otsego counties
- 21st District: Madison and Oswego counties
- 22nd District: Onondaga and Cortland counties
- 23rd District: Chenango, Delaware and Schoharie counties
- 24th District: Broome, Tompkins and Tioga counties
- 25th District: Cayuga and Wayne counties
- 26th District: Ontario, Seneca and Yates counties
- 27th District: Chemung, Schuyler and Steuben counties
- 28th District: Monroe County
- 29th District: Genesee, Niagara and Orleans counties
- 30th District: Allegany, Livingston and Wyoming counties
- 31st District: Erie County
- 32nd District: Cattaraugus and Chautauqua counties
Note: There are now 62 counties in the State of New York. The counties which are not mentioned in this list had not yet been established, or sufficiently organized, the area being included in one or more of the abovementioned counties.

=== Members ===
The asterisk (*) denotes members of the previous Legislature who continued in office as members of this Legislature. Thomas J. Creamer and Henry W. Genet changed from the Assembly to the Senate.

Party affiliations follow the vote for Senate officers.

District	Senator	Party	Notes
1st	Lewis A. Edwards	Democrat	
2nd	James F. Pierce	Democrat	
3rd	Henry C. Murphy*	Democrat	re-elected; also a delegate to the Constitutional Convention
4th	William M. Tweed	Democrat	
5th	Michael Norton	Democrat	also an alderman of New York City
6th	Thomas J. Creamer*	Democrat	
7th	John J. Bradley	Democrat	
8th	Henry W. Genet*	Democrat	
9th	William Cauldwell	Democrat	
10th	William M. Graham	Democrat	
11th	Abiah W. Palmer	Republican	
12th	Francis S. Thayer	Republican	
13th	A. Bleecker Banks	Democrat	
14th	George Beach	Democrat	
15th	Charles Stanford*	Republican	re-elected
16th	Matthew Hale	Republican	also a delegate to the Constitutional Convention
17th	Abraham X. Parker	Republican	
18th	John O'Donnell*	Republican	re-elected
19th	Samuel Campbell*	Republican	re-elected
20th	John B. Van Petten	Republican	
21st	Abner C. Mattoon	Republican	
22nd	George N. Kennedy	Republican	
23rd	John F. Hubbard Jr.	Democrat	
24th	Orlow W. Chapman	Republican	
25th	Stephen K. Williams*	Republican	re-elected
26th	Charles J. Folger*	Republican	re-elected; also a delegate to the Constitutional Convention; on January 15, elected president pro tempore
27th	John I. Nicks*	Republican	re-elected
28th	Lewis H. Morgan	Republican	
29th	Richard Crowley*	Republican	re-elected
30th	Wolcott J. Humphrey*	Republican	re-elected
31st	Asher P. Nichols	Democrat	
32nd	Lorenzo Morris	Democrat	

=== Employees ===
- Clerk: James Terwilliger
- Sergeant-at-Arms: John H. Kemper
- Assistant Sergeant-at-Arms: George H. Knapp
- Doorkeeper: Charles V. Schram
- Assistant Doorkeeper: Nathaniel Saxton
- Assistant Doorkeeper: David L. Shields
- Assistant Doorkeeper: Elisha T. Burdick

== State Assembly ==
=== Assemblymen ===
The asterisk (*) denotes members of the previous Legislature who continued as members of this Legislature. Nicholas B. La Bau changed from the Senate to the Assembly.

Party affiliations follow the listing in the Life Sketches.

District		Assemblymen	Party	Notes
Albany	1st	John C. Chism	Democrat	
Albany	2nd	Francis H. Woods	Democrat	
Albany	3rd	Jackson A. Sumner	Democrat	
Albany	4th	Theodore Van Volkenburgh	Democrat	
Allegany		Silas Richardson	Republican	
Broome		Chauncey C. Bennett	Republican	
Cattaraugus	1st	Jonas K. Button	Democrat	
Cattaraugus	2nd	E. Curtis Topliff	Republican	
Cayuga	1st	Charles H. Weed	Republican	
Cayuga	2nd	Sanford Gifford	Republican	
Chautauqua	1st	Matthew P. Bemus	Republican	
Chautauqua	2nd	Winfield S. Cameron	Republican	
Chemung		Edmund Miller	Democrat	
Chenango		Frederick Juliand*	Republican	
Clinton		William F. Cook	Republican	
Columbia	1st	Harper W. Rogers	Democrat	
Columbia	2nd	Stephen H. Wendover*	Republican	
Cortland		Raymond P. Babcock	Republican	
Delaware	1st	Albert E. Sullard	Republican	
Delaware	2nd	Edward I. Burhans	Democrat	
Dutchess	1st	Augustus A. Brush*	Republican	
Dutchess	2nd	Alfred T. Ackert	Democrat	
Erie	1st	George J. Bamler	Democrat	
Erie	2nd	Richard Flach	Democrat	
Erie	3rd	Lewis P. Dayton	Democrat	
Erie	4th	Alpheus Prince*	Democrat	also a manager at the impeachment trial
Erie	5th	James Rider	Republican	
Essex		Samuel Root	Republican	
Franklin		Edmund F. Sargent	Republican	
Fulton and Hamilton		Samuel W. Buel	Democrat	
Genesee		Henry F. Tarbox*	Republican	
Greene		James Loughran	Democrat	
Herkimer		Elisha W. Stannard	Republican	
Jefferson	1st	LaFayette J. Bigelow*	Republican	
Jefferson	2nd	Andrew Cornwall	Democrat	
Kings	1st	Patrick Burns*	Democrat	
Kings	2nd	William S. Andrews	Democrat	
Kings	3rd	Patrick Keady*	Democrat	
Kings	4th	Francis A. Mallison	Democrat	
Kings	5th	William C. Jones	Democrat	
Kings	6th	Jacob Worth	Republican	contested, seat vacated on March 13
Kings	6th	John Raber	Democrat	seated on March 13
Kings	7th	Caleb L. Smith	Democrat	
Kings	8th	DeWitt C. Tower	Democrat	
Kings	9th	John C. Jacobs*	Democrat	also a manager at the impeachment trial
Lewis		John F. Mann	Republican	
Livingston		Lewis E. Smith	Republican	
Madison	1st	D. Gerry Wellington	Republican	
Madison	2nd	Robert Stewart	Republican	
Monroe	1st	John Martin Davis	Republican	
Monroe	2nd	Nehemiah C. Bradstreet	Democrat	
Monroe	3rd	Abner I. Wood*	Republican	
Montgomery		Angell Matthewson	Democrat	
New York	1st	Michael C. Murphy*	Democrat	
New York	2nd	Dennis Burns	Democrat	
New York	3rd	Daniel O'Reilly*	Democrat	
New York	4th	John Galvin	Democrat	
New York	5th	Christopher Johnson	Democrat	
New York	6th	Timothy J. Campbell	Democrat	
New York	7th	James Riley	Democrat	
New York	8th	James Reed*	Democrat	died on February 8, 1868 "suddenly in a saloon on Park Row in New York City"
New York	9th	William G. Bergen	Democrat	
New York	10th	Anthony Hartman	Democrat	
New York	11th	Peter Trainer	Democrat	
New York	12th	William B. Quinn	Democrat	also a manager at the impeachment trial
New York	13th	James C. Moran	Democrat	
New York	14th	James McKiever	Democrat	
New York	15th	Alexander Frear*	Democrat	
New York	16th	James Irving*	Democrat	
New York	17th	Frederick H. Flagge	Democrat	
New York	18th	Lawrence D. Kiernan	Democrat	
New York	19th	William L. Wiley	Democrat	
New York	20th	George B. Van Brunt	Republican	contested; seat vacated on April 7
New York	20th	Henry Clausen Jr.	Democrat	seated on April 7
New York	21st	William Hitchman	Democrat	elected speaker: also a delegate to the Constitutional Convention
Niagara	1st	Ransom M. Skeels	Democrat	
Niagara	2nd	Benjamin Farley	Republican	
Oneida	1st	William H. Chapman	Democrat	
Oneida	2nd	Alanson B. Cady	Republican	
Oneida	3rd	James Stevens	Democrat	
Oneida	4th	Ambrose Nicholson	Republican	
Onondaga	1st	Augustus G. S. Allis	Republican	
Onondaga	2nd	Luke Ranney	Republican	
Onondaga	3rd	Hiram Eaton	Republican	
Ontario	1st	Henry Ray	Republican	
Ontario	2nd	Samuel H. Torrey*	Republican	
Orange	1st	William C. H. Sherman	Democrat	unsuccessfully contested by George K. Smith (R)
Orange	2nd	John H. Reeve	Democrat	
Orleans		Edmund L. Pitts*	Republican	also a manager at the impeachment trial
Oswego	1st	John A. Place	Republican	
Oswego	2nd	James D. Lasher	Republican	
Oswego	3rd	Alvin Richardson	Republican	
Otsego	1st	Myron J. Hubbard	Democrat	
Otsego	2nd	William C. Bentley	Democrat	
Putnam		Samuel D. Humphrey	Democrat	
Queens	1st	Francis Skillman*	Democrat	
Queens	2nd	John B. Madden	Democrat	
Rensselaer	1st	John L. Flagg	Democrat	also a manager at the impeachment trial
Rensselaer	2nd	Jared A. Wells	Republican	
Rensselaer	3rd	Harris B. Howard	Democrat	
Richmond		John Decker	Democrat	
Rockland		Thomas Lawrence	Democrat	
St. Lawrence	1st	George M. Gleason*	Republican	
St. Lawrence	2nd	Julius M. Palmer	Republican	
St. Lawrence	3rd	Alexander H. Andrews	Republican	
Saratoga	1st	Truman G. Younglove*	Republican	
Saratoga	2nd	Alembert Pond	Republican	also a delegate to the Constitutional Convention
Schenectady		Robert Furman	Democrat	
Schoharie		William S. Clark*	Democrat	also a manager at the impeachment trial
Schuyler		George Clark	Republican	
Seneca		David D. Lefler	Democrat	
Steuben	1st	John F. Little	Democrat	also a manager at the impeachment trial
Steuben	2nd	Lyman Balcom	Republican	
Suffolk		James M. Halsey	Democrat	
Sullivan		David G. Starr*	Democrat	
Tioga		Oliver H. P. Kinney	Republican	also a delegate to the Constitutional Convention
Tompkins		John H. Selkreg*	Republican	
Ulster	1st	William Lounsbery	Democrat	also a manager at the impeachment trial
Ulster	2nd	Abraham E. Hasbrouck	Democrat	
Ulster	3rd	Theodore Guigou	Democrat	
Warren		Nicholas B. La Bau*	Republican	also a manager at the impeachment trial
Washington	1st	David Underwood	Republican	
Washington	2nd	Nathaniel Daily	Republican	
Wayne	1st	DeWitt Parshall	Republican	
Wayne	2nd	Elijah M. K. Glenn	Republican	resigned on April 11, 1868
Westchester	1st	Samuel M. Purdy*	Democrat	
Westchester	2nd	George J. Penfield*	Democrat	
Westchester	3rd	Henry C. Nelson	Democrat	
Wyoming		William Bristol*	Republican	
Yates		Oliver S. Williams	Democrat	

=== Employees ===
- Clerk: Cornelius W. Armstrong
- Sergeant-at-Arms: Jared Sandford
- Doorkeeper: James Swarthout
- First Assistant Doorkeeper:
- Second Assistant Doorkeeper:

== Sources ==
- The New York Civil List compiled by Franklin Benjamin Hough, Stephen C. Hutchins and Edgar Albert Werner (1870; see pg. 439 for Senate districts; pg. 444 for senators; pg. 450–463 for Assembly districts; pg. 508f for assemblymen; and pg. 593ff for the Constitutional Convention)
- Journal of the Senate (91st Session) (1868)
- Journal of the Assembly (91st Session) (1868; Vol. II)
- Life Sketches of the State Officers, Senators, and Members of the Assembly of the State of New York in 1868 by S. R. Harlow & S. C. Hutchins
- Journal of the Court for the Trial of Impeachments in the Case of Hon. Robert C. Dorn, a Canal Commissioner of the State of New York (1868)
