= 87th New York State Legislature =

New York state legislative session

←	86th	88th	→
- The Old State Capitol (1879)

Overview
- Legislative body: New York State Legislature
- Jurisdiction: New York, United States
- Term: January 1 – December 31, 1864

Senate
- Members: 32
- President: Lt. Gov. David R. Floyd-Jones (D)
- Temporary President: James M. Cook (R), on February 3; James A. Bell (R), from February 4
- Party control: Republican (20-12)

Assembly
- Members: 128
- Speaker: Thomas G. Alvord (R)
- Party control: Republican (82-46)

Sessions
- 1st: January 5 – April 23, 1864

The 87th New York State Legislature, consisting of the New York State Senate and the New York State Assembly, met from January 5 to April 23, 1864, during the second year of Horatio Seymour's second tenure as Governor of New York, in Albany.

== Background ==
Under the provisions of the New York Constitution of 1846, 32 Senators and 128 assemblymen were elected in single-seat districts; senators for a two-year term, assemblymen for a one-year term. The senatorial districts were made up of entire counties, except New York County (four districts) and Kings County (two districts). The Assembly districts were made up of entire towns, or city wards, forming a contiguous area, all within the same county.

At this time there were two major political parties: the Republican Party and the Democratic Party. The Democrats split over the civil war issue. The "War Democrats" and the Republicans formed a coalition known as the "Republican Union," and supported President Abraham Lincoln and the Union Army's war effort; the rump Democratic Party opposed the war, favoring a compromise with the South, and became known as "Peace Democrats" or "Copperheads."

== Elections ==
The 1863 New York state election was held on November 3. All eight statewide elective offices up for election were carried by the Republican Union. The approximate party strength at this election, as expressed by the vote for Secretary of State, was: Republican Union 314,000 and Democrats 285,000.

== Sessions ==
The Legislature met for the regular session at the Old State Capitol in Albany on January 5, 1864; and adjourned on April 23.

Thomas G. Alvord (R) was elected again Speaker with 77 votes against 42 for Jacob L. Smith (D). Joseph B. Cushman (R) was re-elected Clerk of the Assembly with 78 votes against 44 for John C. Jacobs (D).

On February 3, James M. Cook (R) was elected president pro tempore of the State Senate "for this day."

On February 4, James A. Bell (R) was elected president pro tempore of the State Senate "for the present session."

== State Senate ==
=== Districts ===
- 1st District: Queens, Richmond and Suffolk counties
- 2nd District: 1st, 2nd, 3rd, 4th, 5th, 7th, 11th, 13th and 19th wards of the City of Brooklyn
- 3rd District: 6th, 8th, 9th, 10th, 12th, 14th, 15th, 16th, 17th and 18th wards of the City of Brooklyn; and all towns in Kings County
- 4th District: 1st, 2nd, 3rd, 4th, 5th, 6th, 7th, 8th and 14th wards of New York City
- 5th District: 10th, 11th, 13th and 17th wards of New York City
- 6th District: 9th, 15th, 16th and 18th wards of New York City
- 7th District: 12th, 19th, 20th, 21st and 22nd wards of New York City
- 8th District: Putnam, Rockland and Westchester counties
- 9th District: Orange and Sullivan counties
- 10th District: Greene and Ulster counties
- 11th District: Columbia and Dutchess counties
- 12th District: Rensselaer and Washington counties
- 13th District: Albany County
- 14th District: Delaware, Schenectady and Schoharie counties
- 15th District: Fulton, Hamilton, Montgomery and Saratoga counties
- 16th District: Clinton, Essex and Warren counties
- 17th District: Franklin and St. Lawrence counties
- 18th District: Jefferson and Lewis counties
- 19th District: Oneida County
- 20th District: Herkimer and Otsego counties
- 21st District: Oswego County
- 22nd District: Onondaga County
- 23rd District: Chenango, Cortland and Madison counties
- 24th District: Broome, Tompkins and Tioga counties
- 25th District: Cayuga and Wayne counties
- 26th District: Ontario, Seneca and Yates counties
- 27th District: Chemung, Schuyler and Steuben counties
- 28th District: Monroe County
- 29th District: Genesee, Niagara and Orleans counties
- 30th District: Allegany, Livingston and Wyoming counties
- 31st District: Erie County
- 32nd District: Cattaraugus and Chautauqua counties
Note: There are now 62 counties in the State of New York. The counties which are not mentioned in this list had not yet been established, or sufficiently organized, the area being included in one or more of the abovementioned counties.

=== Members ===
The asterisk (*) denotes members of the previous Legislature who continued in office as members of this Legislature. Thomas C. Fields, Saxton Smith, Palmer E. Havens and Ezra Cornell changed from the Assembly to the Senate.

Party affiliations follow the vote for Regents of USNY.

District	Senator	Party	Notes
1st	Robert Christie Jr.	Democrat	
2nd	Demas Strong	Democrat	
3rd	Henry C. Murphy*	Democrat	re-elected
4th	Christian B. Woodruff*	Democrat	re-elected; from May 5, 1864, also a New York City Tax Commissioner
5th	Luke F. Cozans	Democrat	
6th	William Laimbeer Jr.	Republican	
7th	Thomas C. Fields*	Democrat	also a Central Park Commissioner
8th	Saxton Smith*	Democrat	
9th	Archibald C. Niven	Democrat	contested by Henry R. Low (R), decision postponed
10th	George Beach	Democrat	
11th	John B. Dutcher	Republican	
12th	Frederick H. Hastings	Republican	took his seat on January 21
13th	Ira Shafer	Democrat	
14th	Orson M. Allaben	Democrat	
15th	James M. Cook	Republican	on February 3, elected president pro tempore
16th	Palmer E. Havens*	Republican	
17th	Albert Hobbs	Republican	
18th	James A. Bell*	Republican	re-elected; on February 4, elected president pro tempore
19th	Alexander H. Bailey*	Republican	re-elected
20th	George H. Andrews	Republican	
21st	Cheney Ames	Republican	
22nd	Andrew D. White	Republican	
23rd	Frederick Juliand	Republican	
24th	Ezra Cornell*	Republican	
25th	Stephen K. Williams	Republican	
26th	Charles J. Folger*	Republican	re-elected
27th	Stephen T. Hayt	Republican	
28th	George G. Munger	Republican	
29th	Dan H. Cole	Republican	
30th	Wilkes Angel*	Republican	re-elected
31st	James M. Humphrey	Democrat	took his seat on January 6; on November 8, 1864, elected to the 39th U.S. Congress
32nd	Norman M. Allen	Republican	

=== Employees ===
- Clerk: James Terwilliger
- Sergeant-at-Arms: Azel B. Hull
- Assistant Sergeant-at-Arms: Sanders Wilson
- Doorkeeper: Lawrence Van Duzen
- First Assistant Doorkeeper: Casper Walter
- Second Assistant Doorkeeper: Edmund Traver
- Third Assistant Doorkeeper: Anson W. Johnson

== State Assembly ==
=== Assemblymen ===
The asterisk (*) denotes members of the previous Legislature who continued as members of this Legislature.

Party affiliations follow the vote for Speaker, and Regents of USNY.

District		Assemblymen	Party	Notes
Albany	1st	Harris Parr	Democrat	
Albany	2nd	Morgan L. Filkins	Republican	
Albany	3rd	Thomas McCarty	Democrat	
Albany	4th	William L. Oswald*	Democrat	
Allegany	1st	Charles M. Crandall	Republican	
Allegany	2nd	Morris S. Chase	Republican	
Broome		Mulford Northrup	Republican	
Cattaraugus	1st	Smith Parish	Republican	
Cattaraugus	2nd	Albert G. Dow*	Republican	
Cayuga	1st	Benjamin M. Close	Republican	
Cayuga	2nd	William P. Robinson*	Republican	
Chautauqua	1st	John Steward*	Republican	
Chautauqua	2nd	Julien T. Williams	Republican	
Chemung		William T. Post	Republican	
Chenango	1st	George W. Sumner	Republican	
Chenango	2nd	Dyer D. Bullock	Republican	
Clinton		George Hallock	Republican	
Columbia	1st	Amos Miller	Democrat	
Columbia	2nd	Wright H. Barnes	Republican	
Cortland		Benjamin F. Tillinghast	Republican	
Delaware	1st	Jerome B. Landfield	Republican	
Delaware	2nd	Francis R. Gilbert*	Democrat	
Dutchess	1st	James Howard	Republican	
Dutchess	2nd	John N. Cramer	Republican	
Erie	1st	Walter W. Stanard	Democrat	
Erie	2nd	Frederick P. Stevens	Republican	
Erie	3rd	Timothy A. Hopkins*	Democrat	
Erie	4th	Seth Fenner	Republican	
Essex		William H. Richardson	Republican	
Franklin		Albert Andrus*	Republican	
Fulton and Hamilton		William A. Smith	Republican	
Genesee		Loren Green*	Republican	
Greene		William W. Pettit	Democrat	
Herkimer	1st	John H. Wooster	Republican	
Herkimer	2nd	Ezra D. Beckwith	Republican	
Jefferson	1st	George M. Hopkinson	Republican	
Jefferson	2nd	Lewis Palmer	Republican	
Jefferson	3rd	William Dewey*	Republican	took his seat on January 19
Kings	1st	Philip S. Crooke	Republican	
Kings	2nd	John O'Connor	Democrat	
Kings	3rd	Edward D. White	Republican	
Kings	4th	Andrew Walsh	Democrat	
Kings	5th	John C. Perry	Republican	
Kings	6th	Angelo Newton	Republican	
Kings	7th	Jacob Worth	Republican	
Lewis		John O'Donnell	Republican	
Livingston	1st	Hamilton E. Smith*	Republican	
Livingston	2nd	Jonathan B. Morey	Republican	took his seat on January 12
Madison	1st	John W. Lippitt	Republican	
Madison	2nd	Daniel F. Kellogg	Republican	left the Assembly on February 5, due to ill health, and died on April 11, 1864
Monroe	1st	Fairchild Andrus	Republican	
Monroe	2nd	John McConvill	Democrat	
Monroe	3rd	William Rankin	Republican	
Montgomery		John Kellogg	Republican	
New York	1st	Jacob L. Smith	Democrat	
New York	2nd	William P. Kirk	Democrat	
New York	3rd	George M. Curtis	Democrat	
New York	4th	James B. Murray	Democrat	
New York	5th	Henry Rogers*	Democrat	
New York	6th	Walter J. Burke	Democrat	
New York	7th	Erastus C. Benedict	Republican	
New York	8th	William G. Olvany	Democrat	
New York	9th	Samuel C. Reed	Republican	
New York	10th	Anthony Eickhoff	Democrat	until August 1, 1864, also Commissary-General of the State Militia
New York	11th	Carolan O'Brien Bryant	Democrat	
New York	12th	Joseph A. Lyons	Democrat	
New York	13th	Thomas Ryan	Democrat	
New York	14th	Michael N. Salmon	Democrat	
New York	15th	Stephen R. Pinckney	Democrat	
New York	16th	Michael McCann*	Democrat	
New York	17th	Sidney P. Ingraham Jr.	Democrat	
Niagara	1st	James Jackson Jr.	Democrat	
Niagara	2nd	William Morgan*	Republican	
Oneida	1st	Abram B. Weaver*	Democrat	
Oneida	2nd	Levi Blakeslee	Republican	
Oneida	3rd	Chauncey Brodock	Democrat	
Oneida	4th	John W. Douglas	Republican	
Onondaga	1st	Albert L. Green	Republican	
Onondaga	2nd	Thomas G. Alvord	Republican	elected Speaker; on November 8, 1864, elected Lieutenant Governor
Onondaga	3rd	Conrad Shoemaker	Republican	
Ontario	1st	Perez H. Field*	Republican	
Ontario	2nd	Lanson Dewey*	Republican	
Orange	1st	Nathaniel W. Howell	Republican	
Orange	2nd	Charles S. Woodward*	Democrat	
Orleans		Edmund L. Pitts	Republican	
Oswego	1st	Abner C. Mattoon*	Republican	
Oswego	2nd	Hiram W. Loomis*	Republican	
Oswego	3rd	Harvey Palmer*	Republican	
Otsego	1st	James Young	Democrat	
Otsego	2nd	George M. Hollis	Republican	
Putnam		Jeremiah Sherwood	Democrat	
Queens	1st	Charles T. Duryea*	Democrat	
Queens	2nd	Charles McNeill	Democrat	
Rensselaer	1st	James McKeon*	Democrat	
Rensselaer	2nd	George W. Banker	Republican	took his seat on February 2
Rensselaer	3rd	James Dearstyne	Republican	
Richmond		William H. Rutan	Democrat	
Rockland		James S. Haring*	Democrat	
St. Lawrence	1st	George Parker	Republican	
St. Lawrence	2nd	James Redington*	Republican	
St. Lawrence	3rd	Abraham X. Parker*	Republican	
Saratoga	1st	Ira Brockett*	Democrat	
Saratoga	2nd	Edward Edwards	Republican	
Schenectady		Charles Stanford	Republican	
Schoharie		Peter P. Schoolcraft	Democrat	
Schuyler		Lorenzo Webber	Republican	
Seneca		William T. Johnson	Democrat	
Steuben	1st	William E. Bonham	Republican	
Steuben	2nd	Alexander Olcott	Republican	
Steuben	3rd	James Harvey Stephens	Republican	
Suffolk	1st	William H. Gleason	Republican	took his seat on January 12
Suffolk	2nd	Henry C. Platt	Democrat	
Sullivan		James Matthews	Democrat	
Tioga		Jerome Thompson	Republican	
Tompkins		Henry B. Lord	Republican	
Ulster	1st	Jesse F. Bookstaver*	Democrat	
Ulster	2nd	Jacob LeFever*	Republican	
Ulster	3rd	Thomas Hill	Democrat	
Warren		Robert Waddle	Republican	
Washington	1st	R. King Crocker	Republican	
Washington	2nd	Andrew G. Meiklejohn	Republican	
Wayne	1st	Thaddeus W. Collins*	Republican	
Wayne	2nd	Lemuel Durfee*	Republican	
Westchester	1st	Franklin W. Gilley	Democrat	
Westchester	2nd	Alsop H. Lockwood	Democrat	
Westchester	3rd	George A. Brandreth	Republican	
Wyoming		Byron Healy*	Republican	
Yates		Oren G. Loomis	Republican	

=== Employees ===
- Clerk: Joseph B. Cushman
- Sergeant-at-Arms: Charles E. Young
- Doorkeeper: Henry A. Rogers
- First Assistant Doorkeeper: Alexander Frier
- Second Assistant Doorkeeper: Daniel F. Payne

== Sources ==
- The New York Civil List compiled by Franklin Benjamin Hough, Stephen C. Hutchins and Edgar Albert Werner (1870; see pg. 439 for Senate districts; pg. 443 for senators; pg. 450–463 for Assembly districts; and pg. 499ff for assemblymen)
- Journal of the Senate (87th Session) (1864)
- Journal of the Assembly (87th Session) (1864)
