= 88th New York State Legislature =

New York state legislative session

←	87th	89th	→
- The Old State Capitol (1879)

Overview
- Legislative body: New York State Legislature
- Jurisdiction: New York, United States
- Term: January 1 – December 31, 1865

Senate
- Members: 32
- President: Lt. Gov. Thomas G. Alvord (R)
- Temporary President: Charles J. Folger (R), from March 9
- Party control: Republican (21-11)

Assembly
- Members: 128
- Speaker: George G. Hoskins (R)
- Party control: Republican (76-52)

Sessions
- 1st: January 3 – April 28, 1865

The 88th New York State Legislature, consisting of the New York State Senate and the New York State Assembly, met from January 3 to April 28, 1865, during the first year of Reuben E. Fenton's governorship, in Albany.

== Background ==
Under the provisions of the New York Constitution of 1846, 32 Senators and 128 assemblymen were elected in single-seat districts; senators for a two-year term, assemblymen for a one-year term. The senatorial districts were made up of entire counties, except New York County (four districts) and Kings County (two districts). The Assembly districts were made up of entire towns, or city wards, forming a contiguous area, all within the same county.

At this time there were two major political parties: the Republican Party and the Democratic Party. The Democrats split over the civil war issue. The "War Democrats" and the Republicans formed a coalition known as the "Republican Union," and supported President Abraham Lincoln and the Union Army's war effort; the rump Democratic Party opposed the war, favoring a compromise with the South, and became known as "Peace Democrats" or "Copperheads."

== Elections ==
The 1864 New York state election was held on November 8. All four statewide elective offices up for election were carried by the Republican Union. Congressman Reuben E. Fenton and Speaker Thomas G. Alvord defeated the incumbent Gov. Horatio Seymour and Lt. David R. Floyd-Jones. The approximate party strength at this election, as expressed by the vote for Governor, was: Republican Union 369,000 and Democrats 361,000.

== Sessions ==
The Legislature met for the regular session at the Old State Capitol in Albany on January 3, 1865; and adjourned on April 28.

George G. Hoskins (R) was elected Speaker with 72 votes against 50 for Abram B. Weaver (D).

On March 9, Charles J. Folger (R) was elected president pro tempore of the State Senate.

On April 4, the Legislature re-elected Victor M. Rice (R) as Superintendent of Public Instruction.

== State Senate ==
=== Districts ===
- 1st District: Queens, Richmond and Suffolk counties
- 2nd District: 1st, 2nd, 3rd, 4th, 5th, 7th, 11th, 13th and 19th wards of the City of Brooklyn
- 3rd District: 6th, 8th, 9th, 10th, 12th, 14th, 15th, 16th, 17th and 18th wards of the City of Brooklyn; and all towns in Kings County
- 4th District: 1st, 2nd, 3rd, 4th, 5th, 6th, 7th, 8th and 14th wards of New York City
- 5th District: 10th, 11th, 13th and 17th wards of New York City
- 6th District: 9th, 15th, 16th and 18th wards of New York City
- 7th District: 12th, 19th, 20th, 21st and 22nd wards of New York City
- 8th District: Putnam, Rockland and Westchester counties
- 9th District: Orange and Sullivan counties
- 10th District: Greene and Ulster counties
- 11th District: Columbia and Dutchess counties
- 12th District: Rensselaer and Washington counties
- 13th District: Albany County
- 14th District: Delaware, Schenectady and Schoharie counties
- 15th District: Fulton, Hamilton, Montgomery and Saratoga counties
- 16th District: Clinton, Essex and Warren counties
- 17th District: Franklin and St. Lawrence counties
- 18th District: Jefferson and Lewis counties
- 19th District: Oneida County
- 20th District: Herkimer and Otsego counties
- 21st District: Oswego County
- 22nd District: Onondaga County
- 23rd District: Chenango, Cortland and Madison counties
- 24th District: Broome, Tompkins and Tioga counties
- 25th District: Cayuga and Wayne counties
- 26th District: Ontario, Seneca and Yates counties
- 27th District: Chemung, Schuyler and Steuben counties
- 28th District: Monroe County
- 29th District: Genesee, Niagara and Orleans counties
- 30th District: Allegany, Livingston and Wyoming counties
- 31st District: Erie County
- 32nd District: Cattaraugus and Chautauqua counties
Note: There are now 62 counties in the State of New York. What is now Bronx County was then part of Westchester County, while what is now Nassau County was part of Queens County.

=== Members ===
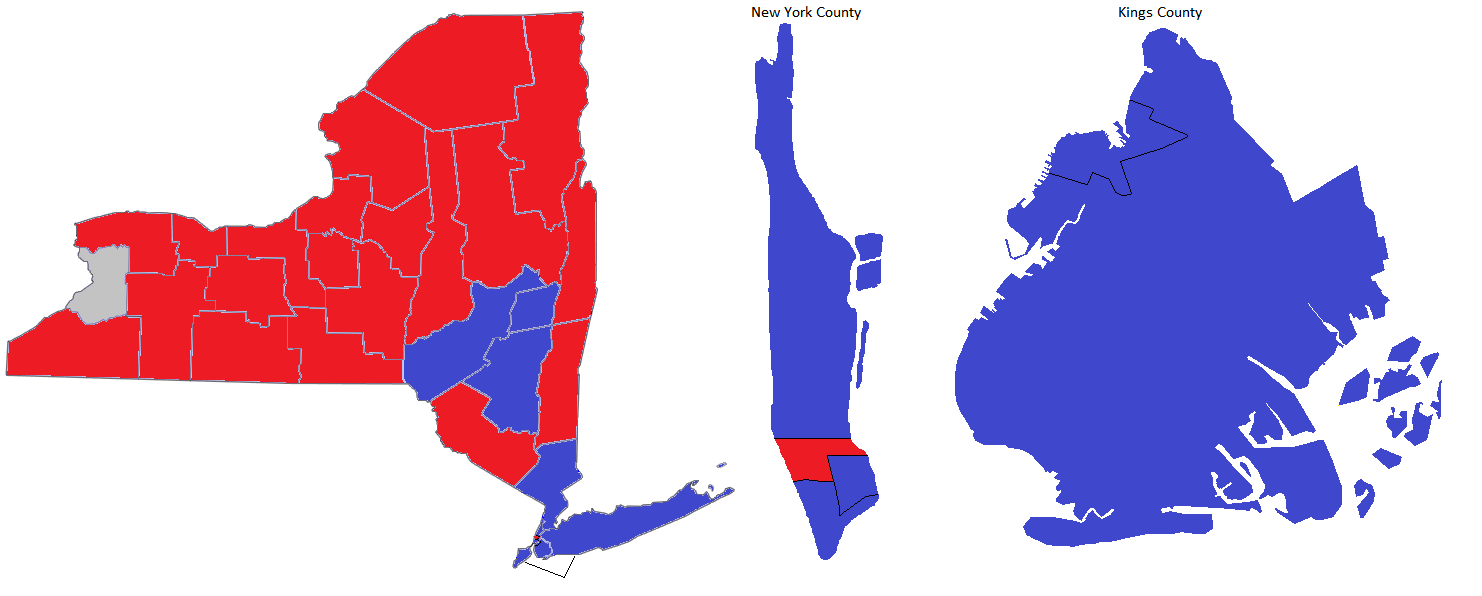
Partisan composition of the Senate after January 17. Humphrey's seat was vacated after he was elected to the U.S. Congress.

The asterisk (*) denotes members of the previous Legislature who continued in office as members of this Legislature.

District	Senator	Party	Notes
1st	Robert Christie Jr.*	Democrat	
2nd	Demas Strong*	Democrat	
3rd	Henry C. Murphy*	Democrat	
4th	Christian B. Woodruff*	Democrat	also a New York City Tax Commissioner
5th	Luke F. Cozans*	Democrat	
6th	William Laimbeer Jr.*	Republican	
7th	Thomas C. Fields*	Democrat	also a Central Park Commissioner
8th	Saxton Smith*	Democrat	
9th	Archibald C. Niven*	Democrat	contested
9th	Henry R. Low	Republican	seated on January 17, 1865
10th	George Beach*	Democrat	
11th	John B. Dutcher*	Republican	
12th	Frederick H. Hastings*	Republican	
13th	Ira Shafer*	Democrat	
14th	Orson M. Allaben*	Democrat	
15th	James M. Cook*	Republican	
16th	Palmer E. Havens*	Republican	
17th	Albert Hobbs*	Republican	
18th	James A. Bell*	Republican	
19th	Alexander H. Bailey*	Republican	
20th	George H. Andrews*	Republican	
21st	Cheney Ames*	Republican	
22nd	Andrew D. White*	Republican	
23rd	Frederick Juliand*	Republican	
24th	Ezra Cornell*	Republican	
25th	Stephen K. Williams*	Republican	
26th	Charles J. Folger*	Republican	on March 9, elected president pro tempore
27th	Stephen T. Hayt*	Republican	
28th	George G. Munger*	Republican	
29th	Dan H. Cole*	Republican	
30th	Wilkes Angel*	Republican	
31st	James M. Humphrey*	Democrat	on November 8, 1864, elected to the 39th U.S. Congress
32nd	Norman M. Allen*	Republican	

=== Employees ===
- Clerk: James Terwilliger
- Sergeant-at-Arms: Azel B. Hull
- Assistant Sergeant-at-Arms: Sanders Wilson
- Doorkeeper: Lawrence Van Duzen
- First Assistant Doorkeeper: Casper Walter
- Second Assistant Doorkeeper: Edmund Traver
- Third Assistant Doorkeeper: Anson W. Johnson

== State Assembly ==
=== Assemblymen ===
The asterisk (*) denotes members of the previous Legislature who continued as members of this Legislature.

Party affiliations follow the vote for Speaker.

District		Assemblymen	Party	Notes
Albany	1st	Harman H. Vanderzee	Democrat	
Albany	2nd	Oliver M. Hungerford	Democrat	contested; seat vacated on April 12
Albany	2nd	Joseph Shook	Republican	seated on April 13
Albany	3rd	Alexander Robertson	Democrat	
Albany	4th	Michael A. Nolan	Democrat	
Allegany	1st	Charles M. Crandall*	Republican	
Allegany	2nd	Albon A. Lewis	Republican	
Broome		Edward C. Mersereau	Republican	
Cattaraugus	1st	William P. Angel	Republican	
Cattaraugus	2nd	E. Curtis Topliff	Republican	
Cayuga	1st	Benjamin M. Close*	Republican	
Cayuga	2nd	John L. Parker	Republican	
Chautauqua	1st	Sextus H. Hungerford	Republican	
Chautauqua	2nd	Martin Crowell	Republican	
Chemung		William T. Post*	Republican	
Chenango	1st	George W. Sumner*	Republican	
Chenango	2nd	Samuel S. Stafford	Republican	
Clinton		Smith M. Weed	Democrat	
Columbia	1st	Walter Shults	Democrat	
Columbia	2nd	Samuel W. Carpenter	Republican	
Cortland		Dan C. Squires	Republican	
Delaware	1st	Ira E. Sherman	Republican	took his seat on February 3
Delaware	2nd	James Oliver	Republican	
Dutchess	1st	James Howard*	Republican	
Dutchess	2nd	Mark D. Wilber	Republican	
Erie	1st	Walter W. Stanard*	Democrat	
Erie	2nd	Harmon S. Cutting	Democrat	
Erie	3rd	John G. Langner	Democrat	
Erie	4th	Edwin W. Godfrey	Republican	
Essex		William H. Richardson*	Republican	
Franklin		James W. Kimball	Republican	
Fulton and Hamilton		Walter N. Clark	Democrat	
Genesee		John W. Brown	Republican	
Greene		Prentiss W. Hallenbeck	Democrat	
Herkimer	1st	Henry Tillinghast	Republican	
Herkimer	2nd	E. Bradley Lee	Republican	
Jefferson	1st	James G. Kellogg	Republican	
Jefferson	2nd	Lewis Palmer*	Republican	
Jefferson	3rd	Russell B. Biddlecom	Republican	
Kings	1st	Jarvis Whitman	Democrat	
Kings	2nd	William D. Veeder	Democrat	
Kings	3rd	Stephen Haynes	Democrat	
Kings	4th	Patrick Burns	Democrat	
Kings	5th	John C. Perry*	Republican	
Kings	6th	Henry C. Boswell	Democrat	
Kings	7th	Jacob Worth*	Republican	
Lewis		Nathan Clark	Republican	
Livingston	1st	Hugh D. McCall	Republican	
Livingston	2nd	Jonathan B. Morey*	Republican	
Madison	1st	Alfred A. Brown	Republican	
Madison	2nd	Alvin Strong	Republican	
Monroe	1st	Fairchild Andrus*	Republican	
Monroe	2nd	John McConvill*	Democrat	
Monroe	3rd	William Rankin*	Republican	
Montgomery		Simeon Sammons	Democrat	
New York	1st	Jacob L. Smith*	Democrat	
New York	2nd	Bryan Gaughan	Democrat	
New York	3rd	George L. Loutrel	Democrat	
New York	4th	James B. Murray*	Democrat	
New York	5th	Charles Blauvelt	Democrat	
New York	6th	Edward S. Maloy	Democrat	
New York	7th	Thomas E. Stewart	Republican	
New York	8th	Jacob Seebacher	Democrat	
New York	9th	Samuel C. Reed*	Republican	
New York	10th	Thomas J. Creamer	Democrat	
New York	11th	John McDonald	Democrat	
New York	12th	Joseph A. Lyons*	Democrat	
New York	13th	Alexander Ward	Democrat	
New York	14th	Michael N. Salmon*	Democrat	
New York	15th	Thomas B. Van Buren	Republican	
New York	16th	John Keegan	Democrat	
New York	17th	Sidney P. Ingraham Jr.*	Democrat	
Niagara	1st	Albert H. Pickard	Republican	took his seat on January 4
Niagara	2nd	Guy C. Humphrey	Republican	
Oneida	1st	Abram B. Weaver*	Democrat	
Oneida	2nd	Lorenzo Rouse	Republican	
Oneida	3rd	Thomas D. Penfield	Democrat	
Oneida	4th	George W. Cole	Republican	
Onondaga	1st	Albert L. Green*	Republican	
Onondaga	2nd	Daniel P. Wood	Republican	
Onondaga	3rd	Harvey P. Tolman	Republican	
Ontario	1st	Volney Edgerton	Republican	
Ontario	2nd	Edward Brunson	Republican	
Orange	1st	Ananias B. Hulse	Republican	
Orange	2nd	Theodore H. Cooper	Democrat	
Orleans		Edmund L. Pitts*	Republican	
Oswego	1st	Elias Root	Republican	
Oswego	2nd	Richard K. Sanford	Republican	
Oswego	3rd	Avery W. Severance	Republican	also Supervisor of New Haven
Otsego	1st	Luther I. Burditt	Democrat	
Otsego	2nd	George M. Hollis*	Republican	
Putnam		Jeremiah Sherwood*	Democrat	
Queens	1st	William Turner	Democrat	
Queens	2nd	Charles McNeill*	Democrat	
Rensselaer	1st	George C. Burdett	Democrat	took his seat on April 15
Rensselaer	2nd	Robert M. Hasbrouck	Republican	
Rensselaer	3rd	Matthew V. A. Fonda	Democrat	
Richmond		James Ridgway	Democrat	
Rockland		Prince W. Nickerson	Democrat	
St. Lawrence	1st	George Parker*	Republican	
St. Lawrence	2nd	James Redington*	Republican	
St. Lawrence	3rd	Daniel Shaw	Republican	
Saratoga	1st	George W. Chapman	Democrat	
Saratoga	2nd	Edward Edwards*	Republican	
Schenectady		Charles Stanford*	Republican	
Schoharie		Edward Eldredge	Democrat	
Schuyler		Lorenzo Webber*	Republican	
Seneca		George B. Daniels	Democrat	
Steuben	1st	William E. Bonham*	Republican	
Steuben	2nd	Alexander Olcott*	Republican	
Steuben	3rd	Horace Bemis	Republican	
Suffolk	1st	William H. Gleason*	Republican	
Suffolk	2nd	Henry C. Platt*	Democrat	
Sullivan		James Matthews*	Democrat	
Tioga		William W. Shepard	Republican	
Tompkins		Henry B. Lord*	Republican	
Ulster	1st	Jesse F. Bookstaver*	Democrat	
Ulster	2nd	Jacob LeFever*	Republican	
Ulster	3rd	Andrew S. Weller	Democrat	
Warren		Jerome Lapham	Republican	
Washington	1st	Alexander Barkley	Republican	
Washington	2nd	Sylvester E. Spoor	Republican	
Wayne	1st	Thaddeus W. Collins*	Republican	
Wayne	2nd	William H. Rogers	Republican	
Westchester	1st	Pierre C. Talman	Democrat	
Westchester	2nd	Alsop H. Lockwood*	Democrat	
Westchester	3rd	George A. Brandreth*	Republican	
Wyoming		George G. Hoskins	Republican	elected Speaker; also Postmaster of Bennington
Yates		Eben S. Smith	Republican	

=== Employees ===
- Clerk: Joseph B. Cushman
- Sergeant-at-Arms: Charles E. Young
- Doorkeeper: Henry A. Rogers
- First Assistant Doorkeeper: Richard S. Stout
- Second Assistant Doorkeeper: Alexander Frier

== Sources ==
- The New York Civil List compiled by Franklin Benjamin Hough, Stephen C. Hutchins and Edgar Albert Werner (1870; see pg. 439 for Senate districts; pg. 443 for senators; pg. 450–463 for Assembly districts; and pg. 501ff for assemblymen)
- Journal of the Assembly (88th Session) (1865)
- Documents of the Senate (87th Session) (1864; No. 104: "Report of the Committee on Privileges and Elections in the Matter of the Contested Election in the Ninth Senatorial District")
