= 90th New York State Legislature =

New York state legislative session

| ← | 89th | 91st | → |
- The Old State Capitol (1879)

Overview
- Legislative body: New York State Legislature
- Jurisdiction: New York, United States
- Term: January 1 – December 31, 1867

Senate
- Members: 32
- President: Lt. Gov. Stewart L. Woodford (R)
- Temporary President: Charles J. Folger (R), from January 31; John O'Donnell (R), on April 1; Henry C. Murphy (D), on April 10
- Party control: Republican (27-5)

Assembly
- Members: 128
- Speaker: Edmund L. Pitts (R)
- Party control: Republican (83-45)

Sessions
- 1st: January 1 – April 20, 1867

The 90th New York State Legislature, consisting of the New York State Senate and the New York State Assembly, met from January 1 to April 20, 1867, during the third year of Reuben E. Fenton's governorship, in Albany.

== Background ==
Under the provisions of the New York Constitution of 1846, 32 Senators and 128 assemblymen were elected in single-seat districts; senators for a two-year term, assemblymen for a one-year term. The senatorial districts were made up of entire counties, except New York County (four districts) and Kings County (two districts). The Assembly districts were made up of entire towns, or city wards, forming a contiguous area, all within the same county.

On April 16, 1866, the Legislature re-apportioned the Assembly seats per county. Allegany, Chenango, Herkimer, Jefferson, Livingston, Steuben and Suffolk counties lost one seat each; Erie County gained one seat, Kings County gained two seats; and New York County gained four seats.

On April 25, 1866, the Legislature re-apportioned the Senate districts.

At this time there were two major political parties: the Republican Party and the Democratic Party. During the American Civil War many War Democrats had joined the Republicans, and after the end of the war the parties re-aligned, leaving the Democrats in a minority. To increase their ranks, the Democrats now proposed to form a "Conservative Union" of Democrats and Conservative Republicans, and nominated a state ticket with Democrat John T. Hoffman for Governor, and Republican Robert H. Pruyn for Lieutenant Governor.

== Elections ==
The 1866 New York state election was held on November 6. Gov. Reuben E. Fenton was re-elected. Stewart L. Woodford (R) was elected Lieutenant Governor, and the other two statewide elective offices up for election were carried by the Republicans too. The approximate party strength at this election, as expressed by the vote for Governor, was: Republicans 366,000 and Conservative Union 352,000. According to the Constitution of 1846, twenty years after its elaboration the electorate was asked if they wanted a Constitutional Convention to be held, which was answered in the affirmative.

== Sessions ==
The Legislature met for the regular session at the Old State Capitol in Albany on January 1, 1867; and adjourned on April 20.

Edmund L. Pitts (R) was elected Speaker with 80 votes against 43 for Jarvis Lord (D).

On January 15, the Legislature elected Roscoe Conkling (R) to succeed Ira Harris as U.S. Senator from New York for a six-year term beginning on March 4, 1867.

On January 25, the State Senate concluded the trial of George W. Smith, Judge of the Oneida County Court, and removed Smith from office.

On January 31, Charles J. Folger was re-elected President pro tempore of the State Senate.

On April 1, John O'Donnell (R) was elected president pro tempore "for the evening."

On April 10, Henry C. Murphy (D) was elected president pro tempore "for the day."

On April 23, the delegates to the Constitutional Convention were elected, resulting in a Republican majority.

On June 4, the Constitutional Convention met at Albany. William A. Wheeler was chosen President, and Luther Caldwell Secretary. On the opening day, one of the delegates, Assemblyman L. Harris Hiscock was murdered at Stanwix Hall (a hotel in Albany).

On September 23, the Constitutional Convention adjourned.

On November 5, the 1867 New York state election, was held. All eight statewide elective offices up for election were carried by the Democrats, and a Democratic majority was elected to the Assembly.

On November 12, the Constitutional Convention met again, and adjourned sine die on February 28, 1868. How to put the proposed amendments before the electorate was then debated throughout the 91st and the 92nd Legislatures, and all amendments, except the re-organization of the judicial system, were eventually rejected by the voters at the 1869 New York state election.

== State Senate ==
=== Districts ===
Note: The Senators in the 90th Legislature had been elected in November 1865 for a two-year term under the apportionment of 1857, as listed below. Although the 89th Legislature (1866) had re-apportioned the Senate districts, the first election under the new apportionment was held in November 1867, to elect the senators who sat in the 91st Legislature.

- 1st District: Queens, Richmond and Suffolk counties
- 2nd District: 1st, 2nd, 3rd, 4th, 5th, 7th, 11th, 13th and 19th wards of the City of Brooklyn
- 3rd District: 6th, 8th, 9th, 10th, 12th, 14th, 15th, 16th, 17th and 18th wards of the City of Brooklyn; and all towns in Kings County
- 4th District: 1st, 2nd, 3rd, 4th, 5th, 6th, 7th, 8th and 14th wards of New York City
- 5th District: 10th, 11th, 13th and 17th wards of New York City
- 6th District: 9th, 15th, 16th and 18th wards of New York City
- 7th District: 12th, 19th, 20th, 21st and 22nd wards of New York City
- 8th District: Putnam, Rockland and Westchester counties
- 9th District: Orange and Sullivan counties
- 10th District: Greene and Ulster counties
- 11th District: Columbia and Dutchess counties
- 12th District: Rensselaer and Washington counties
- 13th District: Albany County
- 14th District: Delaware, Schenectady and Schoharie counties
- 15th District: Fulton, Hamilton, Montgomery and Saratoga counties
- 16th District: Clinton, Essex and Warren counties
- 17th District: Franklin and St. Lawrence counties
- 18th District: Jefferson and Lewis counties
- 19th District: Oneida County
- 20th District: Herkimer and Otsego counties
- 21st District: Oswego County
- 22nd District: Onondaga County
- 23rd District: Chenango, Cortland and Madison counties
- 24th District: Broome, Tompkins and Tioga counties
- 25th District: Cayuga and Wayne counties
- 26th District: Ontario, Seneca and Yates counties
- 27th District: Chemung, Schuyler and Steuben counties
- 28th District: Monroe County
- 29th District: Genesee, Niagara and Orleans counties
- 30th District: Allegany, Livingston and Wyoming counties
- 31st District: Erie County
- 32nd District: Cattaraugus and Chautauqua counties
Note: There are now 62 counties in the State of New York. The counties which are not mentioned in this list had not yet been established, or sufficiently organized, the area being included in one or more of the abovementioned counties.

=== Members ===
The asterisk (*) denotes members of the previous Legislature who continued in office as members of this Legislature.

| District | Senator | Party | Notes |
|---|---|---|---|
| 1st | Nicholas B. La Bau* | Republican | |
| 2nd | Henry R. Pierson* | Republican | |
| 3rd | Henry C. Murphy* | Democrat | on April 10, elected president pro tempore; also a delegate to the Constitutional Convention |
| 4th | Benjamin Wood* | Democrat | |
| 5th | Charles G. Cornell* | Democrat | |
| 6th | Abraham Lent* | Republican | |
| 7th | Thomas Murphy* | Republican | |
| 8th | Edmund G. Sutherland* | Democrat | |
| 9th | Henry R. Low* | Republican | |
| 10th | George Chambers* | Democrat | |
| 11th | Edward G. Wilbor* | Republican | |
| 12th | James Gibson* | Republican | |
| 13th | Lorenzo D. Collins* | Republican | |
| 14th | Charles Stanford* | Republican | |
| 15th | Adam W. Kline* | Republican | |
| 16th | Moss K. Platt* | Republican | |
| 17th | Abel Godard* | Republican | |
| 18th | John O'Donnell* | Republican | on April 1, elected president pro tempore |
| 19th | Samuel Campbell* | Republican | |
| 20th | George H. Andrews* | Republican | |
| 21st | John J. Wolcott* | Republican | |
| 22nd | Andrew D. White* | Republican | |
| 23rd | James Barnett* | Republican | |
| 24th | Ezra Cornell* | Republican | |
| 25th | Stephen K. Williams* | Republican | |
| 26th | Charles J. Folger* | Republican | on January 31, elected president pro tempore; also a delegate to the Constitutional Convention |
| 27th | John I. Nicks | Republican | elected to fill vacancy, in place of Stephen T. Hayt; until March 1867, also Mayor of Elmira |
| 28th | Thomas Parsons* | Republican | |
| 29th | Richard Crowley* | Republican | |
| 30th | Wolcott J. Humphrey* | Republican | |
| 31st | David S. Bennett* | Republican | |
| 32nd | Walter L. Sessions* | Republican | |

=== Employees ===
- Clerk: James Terwilliger
- Sergeant-at-Arms: Arthur Hotchkiss
- Assistant Sergeant-at-Arms: Sanders Wilson
- Doorkeeper: Herman B. Young
- First Assistant Doorkeeper: Frank M. Jones
- Second Assistant Doorkeeper: Nathaniel Saxton
- Third Assistant Doorkeeper: August Wagner

== State Assembly ==
=== Assemblymen ===
The asterisk (*) denotes members of the previous Legislature who continued as members of this Legislature.

Party affiliations follow the vote for Speaker.

| District | | Assemblymen | Party | Notes |
|---|---|---|---|---|
| Albany | 1st | Hugh Conger | Republican | |
| Albany | 2nd | Henry Smith | Republican | also D.A. of Albany Co. |
| Albany | 3rd | Alexander Robertson | Democrat | |
| Albany | 4th | Oscar F. Potter | Republican | |
| Allegany | | Charles M. Crandall | Republican | died on October 4, 1867 |
| Broome | | James Van Valkenburgh | Republican | |
| Cattaraugus | 1st | Heman G. Button | Republican | |
| Cattaraugus | 2nd | William E. Hunt | Republican | |
| Cayuga | 1st | Homer N. Lockwood* | Republican | |
| Cayuga | 2nd | John L. Parker* | Republican | |
| Chautauqua | 1st | Joseph B. Fay* | Republican | |
| Chautauqua | 2nd | Orson Stiles* | Republican | |
| Chemung | | George W. Buck | Republican | |
| Chenango | | Frederick Juliand | Republican | |
| Clinton | | Smith M. Weed* | Democrat | also a delegate to the Constitutional Convention |
| Columbia | 1st | Jacob H. Duntz | Republican | |
| Columbia | 2nd | Stephen H. Wendover | Republican | |
| Cortland | | Horatio Ballard | Republican | also a delegate to the Constitutional Convention |
| Delaware | 1st | Joshua Smith | Republican | |
| Delaware | 2nd | George C. Gibbs | Republican | |
| Dutchess | 1st | Augustus A. Brush | Republican | |
| Dutchess | 2nd | Mark D. Wilber* | Republican | |
| Erie | 1st | Charles W. Hinson | Democrat | |
| Erie | 2nd | William Williams* | Democrat | |
| Erie | 3rd | Roswell L. Burrows | Republican | |
| Erie | 4th | Alpheus Prince | Democrat | |
| Erie | 5th | Joseph H. Plumb | Republican | |
| Essex | | Palmer E. Havens | Republican | |
| Franklin | | James W. Kimball* | Republican | |
| Fulton and Hamilton | | Joseph Covell* | Republican | |
| Genesee | | Henry F. Tarbox | Republican | |
| Greene | | Thomas A. Briggs | Democrat | |
| Herkimer | | Seth M. Richmond | Republican | |
| Jefferson | 1st | LaFayette J. Bigelow | Republican | |
| Jefferson | 2nd | Albert D. Shaw | Republican | |
| Kings | 1st | Patrick Burns | Democrat | |
| Kings | 2nd | Theodore Hinsdale | Republican | |
| Kings | 3rd | Patrick Keady | Democrat | |
| Kings | 4th | Stephen Haynes | Democrat | |
| Kings | 5th | Caleb F. Buckley | Democrat | |
| Kings | 6th | John Raber | Democrat | |
| Kings | 7th | Henry M. Dixon | Democrat | unsuccessfully contested by Ira Buckman Jr. |
| Kings | 8th | John Oakey* | Republican | |
| Kings | 9th | John C. Jacobs | Democrat | |
| Lewis | | Henry A. Phillips | Republican | |
| Livingston | | Jacob A. Mead | Republican | |
| Madison | 1st | Bushrod E. Hoppin | Republican | |
| Madison | 2nd | Benjamin F. Bruce | Republican | |
| Monroe | 1st | Jarvis Lord | Democrat | |
| Monroe | 2nd | Henry Cribben | Republican | |
| Monroe | 3rd | Abner I. Wood* | Republican | |
| Montgomery | | Abraham Hoffman | Republican | |
| New York | 1st | Michael C. Murphy | Democrat | |
| New York | 2nd | Constantine Donoho* | Democrat | |
| New York | 3rd | Daniel O'Reilly | Democrat | |
| New York | 4th | John J. Blair | Democrat | |
| New York | 5th | Charles Blauvelt | Democrat | |
| New York | 6th | John Siegerson | Democrat | |
| New York | 7th | Frank A. Ransom | Democrat | unsuccessfully contested by Edward Mitchell |
| New York | 8th | James Reed | Democrat | |
| New York | 9th | Henry Rogers | Democrat | also a delegate to the Constitutional Convention |
| New York | 10th | Owen Murphy | Democrat | |
| New York | 11th | John V. Gridley | Republican | |
| New York | 12th | Henry Woltman | Democrat | |
| New York | 13th | Bernard Cregan | Democrat | |
| New York | 14th | Thomas J. Creamer* | Democrat | |
| New York | 15th | Alexander Frear* | Democrat | |
| New York | 16th | James Irving | Democrat | |
| New York | 17th | Wilson Berryman* | Republican | |
| New York | 18th | Leander Buck | Democrat | |
| New York | 19th | John E. Develin | Democrat | |
| New York | 20th | Patrick Russell | Democrat | |
| New York | 21st | Henry W. Genet | Democrat | |
| Niagara | 1st | Elisha Moody | Republican | |
| Niagara | 2nd | William Pool | Republican | |
| Oneida | 1st | Levi Blakeslee | Republican | |
| Oneida | 2nd | Ellis H. Roberts | Republican | |
| Oneida | 3rd | George H. Sanford | Democrat | |
| Oneida | 4th | Leander W. Fiske | Republican | |
| Onondaga | 1st | Daniel P. Wood* | Republican | |
| Onondaga | 2nd | L. Harris Hiscock | Republican | also a delegate to the Constitutional Convention; murdered on June 4, 1867 |
| Onondaga | 3rd | Samuel Candee | Republican | |
| Ontario | 1st | Hiram Schutt* | Republican | |
| Ontario | 2nd | Samuel H. Torrey | Republican | |
| Orange | 1st | Lewis B. Halsey | Republican | |
| Orange | 2nd | George W. Millspaugh* | Democrat | |
| Orleans | | Edmund L. Pitts* | Republican | elected Speaker |
| Oswego | 1st | DeWitt C. Littlejohn* | Republican | |
| Oswego | 2nd | William H. Rice* | Republican | |
| Oswego | 3rd | Charles McKinney | Republican | |
| Otsego | 1st | Edgar B. Clarke | Republican | |
| Otsego | 2nd | Sheffield Harrington* | Republican | |
| Putnam | | Lewis H. Gregory | Democrat | contested; seat vacated on January 16 |
| Putnam | | Stephen Baker | Republican | seated on January 16 |
| Queens | 1st | Francis Skillman | Democrat | |
| Queens | 2nd | William B. Wilson | Democrat | |
| Rensselaer | 1st | William Gurley | Republican | |
| Rensselaer | 2nd | Marshall F. White* | Republican | |
| Rensselaer | 3rd | Eleazer Wooster* | Republican | |
| Richmond | | Nathaniel J. Wyeth | Democrat | |
| Rockland | | James Suffern | Democrat | |
| St. Lawrence | 1st | George M. Gleason* | Republican | |
| St. Lawrence | 2nd | William R. Chamberlain* | Republican | |
| St. Lawrence | 3rd | Richmond Bicknell | Republican | |
| Saratoga | 1st | Truman G. Younglove* | Republican | |
| Saratoga | 2nd | Austin L. Reynolds* | Republican | |
| Schenectady | | Charles G. Ellis | Republican | |
| Schoharie | | William S. Clark | Democrat | Assemblyman-elect Daniel Shaver died; Clark elected to fill vacancy |
| Schuyler | | Samuel M. Barker* | Republican | |
| Seneca | | Samuel R. Welles | Democrat | |
| Steuben | 1st | William B. Boyd* | Republican | |
| Steuben | 2nd | Christian Minier | Republican | |
| Suffolk | | Alfred Wagstaff Jr. | Republican | |
| Sullivan | | David G. Starr | Democrat | Assemblyman-elect Alfred J. Baldwin died; Starr elected to fill vacancy on December 18, 1866 |
| Tioga | | Oliver A. Barstow | Republican | |
| Tompkins | | John H. Selkreg | Republican | |
| Ulster | 1st | John Maxwell | Republican | |
| Ulster | 2nd | Jacob LeFever | Republican | |
| Ulster | 3rd | John G. Baker | Democrat | |
| Warren | | Columbus Gill | Republican | |
| Washington | 1st | Thomas Shiland | Republican | |
| Washington | 2nd | Adolphus F. Hitchcock | Republican | also a delegate to the Constitutional Convention |
| Wayne | 1st | John Vandenberg* | Republican | |
| Wayne | 2nd | Ornon Archer | Republican | also a delegate to the Constitutional Convention |
| Westchester | 1st | Samuel M. Purdy | Democrat | |
| Westchester | 2nd | George J. Penfield | Democrat | |
| Westchester | 3rd | David W. Travis | Republican | |
| Wyoming | | William Bristol | Republican | |
| Yates | | Charles S. Hoyt | Republican | |

=== Employees ===
- Clerk: Luther Caldwell
- Sergeant-at-Arms: John H. Kemper
- Doorkeeper: J. B. Davis
- First Assistant Doorkeeper: Charles G. Gardiner
- Second Assistant Doorkeeper: James Tanner

== Sources ==
- The New York Civil List compiled by Franklin Benjamin Hough, Stephen C. Hutchins and Edgar Albert Werner (1870; see pg. 439 for Senate districts; pg. 444 for senators; pg. 450–463 for Assembly districts; pg. 506f for assemblymen; and pg. 593ff for the Constitutional Convention)
- Journal of the Senate (90th Session) (1867)
- Journal of the Assembly (90th Session) (1867; Vol. I)
- Life Sketches of the State Officers, Senators, and Members of the Assembly of the State of New York in 1867 by S. R. Harlow & H. H. Boone
- Journal of Proceedings of the Senate in the Matter of George W. Smith, Judge of Oneida County, in Relation to Charges Submitted to the Senate by the Governor (1867)
