= 89th New York State Legislature =

New York state legislative session

←	88th	90th	→
- The Old State Capitol (1879)

Overview
- Legislative body: New York State Legislature
- Jurisdiction: New York, United States
- Term: January 1 – December 31, 1866

Senate
- Members: 32
- President: Lt. Gov. Thomas G. Alvord (R)
- Temporary President: Charles J. Folger (R), from February 6
- Party control: Republican (27-5)

Assembly
- Members: 128
- Speaker: Lyman Tremain (R)
- Party control: Republican (90-38)

Sessions
- 1st: January 2 – April 20, 1866
- 2nd (Senate only): June 12 – 15, 1866
- 3rd (Senate only): August 28 – 31, 1866

The 89th New York State Legislature, consisting of the New York State Senate and the New York State Assembly, met from January 2 to April 20, 1866, during the second year of Reuben E. Fenton's governorship, in Albany.

== Background ==
Under the provisions of the New York Constitution of 1846, 32 Senators and 128 assemblymen were elected in single-seat districts; senators for a two-year term, assemblymen for a one-year term. The senatorial districts were made up of entire counties, except New York County (four districts) and Kings County (two districts). The Assembly districts were made up of entire towns, or city wards, forming a contiguous area, all within the same county.

At this time there were two major political parties: the Republican Party and the Democratic Party.

== Elections ==
The 1865 New York state election was held on November 7. All ten statewide elective offices up for election were carried by the Republicans. The approximate party strength at this election, as expressed by the vote for Secretary of State, was: Republicans 301,000 and Democrats 273,000.

== Sessions ==
The Legislature met for the regular session at the Old State Capitol in Albany on January 2, 1866; and adjourned on April 20.

Lyman Tremain (R) was elected Speaker with 88 votes against 33 for Smith M. Weed (D).

On January 29, DeWitt C. Littlejohn (R) was elected Speaker pro tempore of the Assembly.

On February 6, Charles J. Folger (R) was re-elected President pro tempore of the State Senate.

On February 16, the Legislature elected Benjamin F. Manierre (R) to succeed William McMurray (D) on March 1 as a Metropolitan Police Commissioner.

On April 16, the Legislature re-apportioned the Assembly seats per county. Allegany, Chenango, Herkimer, Jefferson, Livingston, Steuben and Suffolk counties lost one seat each; Erie County gained one seat, Kings County gained two seats; and New York County gained four seats.

On April 25, the Legislature re-apportioned the Senate districts.

The State Senate met for a special session on June 12; adjourned on June 15; met again on August 28; and adjourned again on August 31. This session was called to hold the trial of George W. Smith, Judge of the Oneida County Court. The trial continued during the next session, and Smith was removed from office on January 25, 1867.

== State Senate ==
=== Districts ===
- 1st District: Queens, Richmond and Suffolk counties
- 2nd District: 1st, 2nd, 3rd, 4th, 5th, 7th, 11th, 13th and 19th wards of the City of Brooklyn
- 3rd District: 6th, 8th, 9th, 10th, 12th, 14th, 15th, 16th, 17th and 18th wards of the City of Brooklyn; and all towns in Kings County
- 4th District: 1st, 2nd, 3rd, 4th, 5th, 6th, 7th, 8th and 14th wards of New York City
- 5th District: 10th, 11th, 13th and 17th wards of New York City
- 6th District: 9th, 15th, 16th and 18th wards of New York City
- 7th District: 12th, 19th, 20th, 21st and 22nd wards of New York City
- 8th District: Putnam, Rockland and Westchester counties
- 9th District: Orange and Sullivan counties
- 10th District: Greene and Ulster counties
- 11th District: Columbia and Dutchess counties
- 12th District: Rensselaer and Washington counties
- 13th District: Albany County
- 14th District: Delaware, Schenectady and Schoharie counties
- 15th District: Fulton, Hamilton, Montgomery and Saratoga counties
- 16th District: Clinton, Essex and Warren counties
- 17th District: Franklin and St. Lawrence counties
- 18th District: Jefferson and Lewis counties
- 19th District: Oneida County
- 20th District: Herkimer and Otsego counties
- 21st District: Oswego County
- 22nd District: Onondaga County
- 23rd District: Chenango, Cortland and Madison counties
- 24th District: Broome, Tompkins and Tioga counties
- 25th District: Cayuga and Wayne counties
- 26th District: Ontario, Seneca and Yates counties
- 27th District: Chemung, Schuyler and Steuben counties
- 28th District: Monroe County
- 29th District: Genesee, Niagara and Orleans counties
- 30th District: Allegany, Livingston and Wyoming counties
- 31st District: Erie County
- 32nd District: Cattaraugus and Chautauqua counties
Note: There are now 62 counties in the State of New York. The counties which are not mentioned in this list had not yet been established, or sufficiently organized, the area being included in one or more of the abovementioned counties.

=== Members ===
The asterisk (*) denotes members of the previous Legislature who continued in office as members of this Legislature. Charles Stanford changed from the Assembly to the Senate.

District	Senator	Party	Notes
1st	Nicholas B. La Bau	Republican	
2nd	Henry R. Pierson	Republican	
3rd	Henry C. Murphy*	Democrat	re-elected
4th	Benjamin Wood	Democrat	took his seat on January 9
5th	Charles G. Cornell	Democrat	until November 17, 1866, also New York City Street Commissioner
6th	Abraham Lent	Republican	
7th	Thomas Murphy	Republican	
8th	Edmund G. Sutherland	Democrat	
9th	Henry R. Low*	Republican	re-elected
10th	George Chambers	Democrat	
11th	Edward G. Wilbor	Republican	
12th	James Gibson	Republican	
13th	Lorenzo D. Collins	Republican	
14th	Charles Stanford*	Republican	
15th	Adam W. Kline	Republican	
16th	Moss K. Platt	Republican	
17th	Abel Godard	Republican	
18th	John O'Donnell	Republican	
19th	Samuel Campbell	Republican	
20th	George H. Andrews*	Republican	re-elected
21st	John J. Wolcott	Republican	
22nd	Andrew D. White*	Republican	re-elected
23rd	James Barnett	Republican	
24th	Ezra Cornell*	Republican	re-elected
25th	Stephen K. Williams*	Republican	re-elected
26th	Charles J. Folger*	Republican	re-elected
27th	Stephen T. Hayt*	Republican	re-elected; on November 6, 1866, elected a Canal Commissioner
28th	Thomas Parsons	Republican	
29th	Richard Crowley	Republican	
30th	Wolcott J. Humphrey	Republican	
31st	David S. Bennett	Republican	
32nd	Walter L. Sessions	Republican	

=== Employees ===
- Clerk: James Terwilliger
- Sergeant-at-Arms: Arthur Hotchkiss
- Assistant Sergeant-at-Arms: Sanders Wilson
- Doorkeeper: Herman B. Young
- First Assistant Doorkeeper: Frank M. Jones
- Second Assistant Doorkeeper: Nathaniel Saxton
- Third Assistant Doorkeeper: August Wagner

== State Assembly ==
=== Assemblymen ===
The asterisk (*) denotes members of the previous Legislature who continued as members of this Legislature.

Party affiliations follow the vote for Speaker and Police Commissioner.

District		Assemblymen	Party	Notes
Albany	1st	William Aley	Democrat	
Albany	2nd	Lyman Tremain	Republican	elected Speaker
Albany	3rd	Clark B. Cochrane	Republican	previously a member from Montgomery Co.
Albany	4th	James F. Crawford	Democrat	unsuccessfully contested by Joseph M. Murphy (R)
Allegany	1st	William Wilson	Republican	
Allegany	2nd	Albon A. Lewis*	Republican	
Broome		Milo B. Eldredge	Republican	
Cattaraugus	1st	William McVey	Republican	
Cattaraugus	2nd	E. Curtis Topliff*	Republican	
Cayuga	1st	Homer N. Lockwood	Republican	
Cayuga	2nd	John L. Parker*	Republican	
Chautauqua	1st	Joseph B. Fay	Republican	
Chautauqua	2nd	Orson Stiles	Republican	
Chemung		Henry C. Hoffman	Democrat	
Chenango	1st	George C. Rice	Republican	
Chenango	2nd	Romeo Warren	Republican	
Clinton		Smith M. Weed*	Democrat	unsuccessfully contested by Andrew Williams (R)
Columbia	1st	Josiah Kniskern	Democrat	
Columbia	2nd	John W. Van Valkenburgh	Democrat	
Cortland		Stephen Patrick	Republican	
Delaware	1st	Ira E. Sherman*	Republican	
Delaware	2nd	John Ferris	Republican	
Dutchess	1st	Abiah W. Palmer	Republican	
Dutchess	2nd	Mark D. Wilber*	Republican	
Erie	1st	William Williams	Democrat	unsuccessfully contested by James S. Lyon (R)
Erie	2nd	John J. L. C. Jewett	Republican	
Erie	3rd	John G. Langner*	Democrat	
Erie	4th	Levi Potter	Republican	
Essex		William H. Richardson*	Republican	
Franklin		James W. Kimball*	Republican	
Fulton and Hamilton		Joseph Covell	Republican	
Genesee		John W. Brown*	Republican	
Greene		Ezekiel P. More	Democrat	
Herkimer	1st	Stephen Turtelot	Republican	
Herkimer	2nd	Archibald C. McGowan	Republican	
Jefferson	1st	Theodore Canfield	Republican	
Jefferson	2nd	Nelson D. Ferguson	Republican	
Jefferson	3rd	Russell B. Biddlecom*	Republican	
Kings	1st	John Oakey	Republican	
Kings	2nd	William D. Veeder*	Democrat	
Kings	3rd	Morris Reynolds	Republican	
Kings	4th	Andrew Walsh	Democrat	
Kings	5th	William W. Goodrich	Republican	
Kings	6th	Ira Buckman Jr.	Republican	
Kings	7th	Jacob Worth*	Republican	
Lewis		Alexander Y. Stewart	Republican	
Livingston	1st	Hugh D. McColl*	Republican	
Livingston	2nd	Samuel D. Faulkner	Democrat	
Madison	1st	Gardner Morse	Republican	
Madison	2nd	Caleb Calkins	Republican	
Monroe	1st	Fairchild Andrus*	Republican	
Monroe	2nd	Henry R. Selden	Republican	
Monroe	3rd	Abner I. Wood	Republican	
Montgomery		Isaac S. Frost	Democrat	
New York	1st	William Minor	Democrat	
New York	2nd	Constantine Donoho	Democrat	took his seat on January 9
New York	3rd	George M. Curtis	Democrat	
New York	4th	Henry McCloskey	Democrat	
New York	5th	William Hepburn	Republican	
New York	6th	William H. Tracy	Democrat	
New York	7th	Thomas E. Stewart*	Republican	on November 6, 1866, elected to the 40th U.S. Congress
New York	8th	Jacob Seebacher*	Democrat	
New York	9th	George Stevenson	Democrat	
New York	10th	Thomas J. Creamer*	Democrat	
New York	11th	Alexander Frear	Democrat	
New York	12th	Joseph A. Lyons*	Democrat	
New York	13th	Wilson Berryman	Republican	
New York	14th	Gideon J. Tucker	Democrat	also Surrogate of New York Co.
New York	15th	Edward H. Anderson	Democrat	
New York	16th	Adolph Levinger	Republican	
New York	17th	Charles E. Jenkins	Republican	
Niagara	1st	Solon S. Pomroy	Democrat	
Niagara	2nd	Guy C. Humphrey*	Republican	
Oneida	1st	George Graham	Democrat	
Oneida	2nd	Alva Penny	Republican	
Oneida	3rd	Benjamin N. Huntington	Republican	
Oneida	4th	Silas L. Snyder	Republican	
Onondaga	1st	Luke Ranney	Republican	
Onondaga	2nd	Daniel P. Wood*	Republican	
Onondaga	3rd	L. Harris Hiscock	Republican	
Ontario	1st	Hiram Schutt	Republican	
Ontario	2nd	Edward Brunson*	Republican	
Orange	1st	Frederick Bodine	Republican	
Orange	2nd	George W. Millspaugh	Democrat	
Orleans		Edmund L. Pitts*	Republican	
Oswego	1st	DeWitt C. Littlejohn	Republican	on January 29, elected Speaker pro tempore
Oswego	2nd	William H. Rice	Republican	
Oswego	3rd	John Parker	Republican	
Otsego	1st	Luther I. Burditt*	Democrat	
Otsego	2nd	Sheffield Harrington	Republican	
Putnam		Stephen Baker	Republican	
Queens	1st	Obadiah J. Downing	Republican	
Queens	2nd	James Maurice	Democrat	
Rensselaer	1st	James S. Thorn	Republican	
Rensselaer	2nd	Marshall F. White	Republican	
Rensselaer	3rd	Eleazer Wooster	Republican	
Richmond		Thomas Child	Republican	
Rockland		Prince W. Nickerson*	Democrat	
St. Lawrence	1st	George M. Gleason	Republican	
St. Lawrence	2nd	William R. Chamberlain	Republican	took his seat on January 4
St. Lawrence	3rd	Daniel Shaw*	Republican	
Saratoga	1st	Truman G. Younglove	Republican	
Saratoga	2nd	Austin L. Reynolds	Republican	
Schenectady		John C. Ellis	Republican	
Schoharie		Benjamin E. Smith	Democrat	
Schuyler		Samuel M. Barker	Republican	
Seneca		Lewis Post	Democrat	
Steuben	1st	William B. Boyd	Republican	
Steuben	2nd	Amaziah S. McKay	Republican	
Steuben	3rd	Frederick M. Kreidler	Republican	
Suffolk	1st	James H. Tuthill	Republican	
Suffolk	2nd	Richard A. Udall	Republican	
Sullivan		Alfred J. Baldwin	Democrat	
Tioga		John H. Deming	Republican	
Tompkins		Lyman Congdon	Republican	
Ulster	1st	Frederick Stephan	Republican	
Ulster	2nd	James G. Graham	Republican	
Ulster	3rd	Andrew S. Weller*	Democrat	
Warren		David Aldrich	Republican	
Washington	1st	Alexander Barkley*	Republican	
Washington	2nd	James C. Rogers	Republican	
Wayne	1st	John Vandenberg	Republican	
Wayne	2nd	William H. Rogers*	Republican	
Westchester	1st	Orrin A. Bills	Democrat	
Westchester	2nd	Lawrence D. Huntington	Democrat	
Westchester	3rd	George A. Brandreth*	Republican	
Wyoming		George G. Hoskins*	Republican	also Postmaster of Bennington
Yates		Eben S. Smith*	Republican	

=== Employees ===
- Clerk: Joseph B. Cushman
- Sergeant-at-Arms: Frederick T. Hempstead
- Doorkeeper: S. P. Remington
- First Assistant Doorkeeper: Alexander Frier
- Second Assistant Doorkeeper: Oscar K. Dean

== Sources ==
- The New York Civil List compiled by Franklin Benjamin Hough, Stephen C. Hutchins and Edgar Albert Werner (1870; see pg. 439 for Senate districts; pg. 444 for senators; pg. 450–463 for Assembly districts; and pg. 504f for assemblymen)
- Journal of the Senate (89th Session) (1866)
- Journal of the Assembly (89th Session) (1866; Vol. I)
- Journal of the Assembly (89th Session) (1866; Vol. II)
- Journal of Proceedings of the Senate in the Matter of George W. Smith, Judge of Oneida County, in Relation to Charges Submitted to the Senate by the Governor (1867)
