= Lorenzo D. Collins =

American businessman, banker and politician

Lorenzo D. Collins (July 13, 1821 Whitehall, Washington County, New York – July 16, 1898) was an American businessman, banker and politician from New York.

== Life ==
He moved to West Troy in about 1841 and in 1843 opened a grocery and provision store and Livery yard there. In 1850, he added storage and forwarding to his business and later also owned canal boats.

He was President of the Village of West Troy in 1853 and in 1855 became a director of the Union Bank of Troy.

He was a member of the New York State Assembly (Albany Co., 4th D.) in 1859 and 1860 and of the New York State Senate (13th D.) in 1866 and 1867.

He was the first Supervisor of the Town of Colonie, elected in 1895. He died of pneumonia, and was buried at the Albany Rural Cemetery in Menands, New York.

== Sources ==
- The New York Civil List compiled by Franklin Benjamin Hough, Stephen C. Hutchins and Edgar Albert Werner (1870; pg. 444, 488 and 490)
- Life Sketches of the State Officers, Senators, and Members of the Assembly of the State of New York, in 1867 by S. R. Harlow & H. H. Boone (pg. 82ff)
- DEATH LIST OF A DAY; Lorenzo D. Collins in NYT on July 18, 1898
- Notable people buried at Albany Rural Cemetery

New York State Assembly
| Preceded by Charles H. Adams | New York State Assembly; Albany County, 4th District; 1859–1860 | Succeeded by William J. Wheeler |
New York State Senate
| Preceded by Ira Shafer | New York State Senate; 13th District; 1866–1867 | Succeeded by A. Bleecker Banks |
