= Andrew Walsh (politician) =

American politician

Andrew Walsh (May 24, 1838 – November 9, 1889) was an Irish-American politician and judge.

== Life ==
Walsh was born on May 24, 1838 in Dublin, Ireland. His family immigrated to America when he was young and settled in Brooklyn, New York.

When he was 15, Walsh became an apprentice for bookbinder G. C. Mann. After he finished his apprenticeship, he began to take an interest in politics. He served as a volunteer firefighter of Constitution Engine, No. 7 for five years.

In 1863, Walsh was a clerk for the Collector of Taxes. That year, he was elected to the New York State Assembly as a Democrat, representing the Kings County 4th District. He served in the Assembly in 1864 and 1866. He then served as Clerk of the First District Police Court. In 1868, he was elected Police Justice. He began serving the position in 1869 and was re-elected to the office three times. Starting in 1880, he was appointed and re-appointed to the office by different mayors. Some months prior to his appointment as Justice, he was admitted to the bar.

Walsh was treasurer of the Roman Catholic Orphan Asylum, a local chancellor of the Catholic Benevolent Legion, treasurer of the Central Parnell organization, and a member of the Emerald Society and St. Patrick Society. He was also treasurer of St John's Orphan Asylum. His son, John J., was a lawyer that succeeded Walsh as Police Justice after the latter's death.

Walsh died at home on November 9, 1889. He was buried in Holy Cross Cemetery.

New York State Assembly
Preceded by James Darcy	New York State Assembly; Kings County, 4th District; 1864	Succeeded by Patrick Burns
Preceded by Patrick Burns	New York State Assembly; Kings County, 4th District; 1866	Succeeded by Stephen Haynes
