= Frederick Juliand =

American politician (1806–1900)

Personal details
- Born: October 9, 1806 Greene, Chenango County, New York, U.S.
- Died: June 22, 1900 (aged 93) Greene, New York, U.S.
- Parent: Joseph Juliand (father)
- Occupation: Merchant; politician

Frederick Juliand (October 9, 1806 – June 22, 1900) was an American merchant and politician.

== Life ==
Juliand was born on October 9, 1806, in Greene, Chenango County, New York. He was the son of Assemblyman Joseph Juliand, a French immigrant from Lyon who settled on a farm in the Town of Greene in 1798. Frederick Juliand became a merchant and served as Postmaster of Greene from 1849 to 1853.

He was a member of the New York State Assembly (Chenango Co., 2nd D.) in 1856 of the New York State Senate (23rd D.) in 1864 and 1865 and again of the State Assembly (Chenango Co.) in 1867 and 1868.

Juliand died on June 22, 1900, at his home in Greene.

New York State Assembly
Preceded by Lewis Fairchild	New York State Assembly; Chenango County, 2nd District; 1856	Succeeded by William H. Hyde
Preceded by George C. Rice (1st D.); Romeo Warren (2nd D.)	New York State Assembly; Chenango County; 1867–1868	Succeeded by Charles Pearsall
New York State Senate
Preceded by Henry A. Clark	New York State Senate; 23rd District; 1864–1865	Succeeded by James Barnett
