= James A. Bell (New York politician) =

American politician

James Augustus Bell (born February 8, 1814, in Hebron, Washington County, New York) was an American politician from New York.

== Life ==
He was the son of George Bell (d. 1841) and Margaret Bell, immigrants from Belfast who settled at Hebron in 1812. In 1824, the family removed to Brownville, Jefferson County, New York. He worked on his fathers farm, and taught school. From 1834 to 1836, he took part in the federal survey of the shores of Lake Huron between Fort Gratiot and the Straits of Mackinac. Afterwards he became a merchant, first in Brownville, later in Dexter. In 1840, he married a Miss Wood who died 18 days later. On December 16, 1841, he married Rachel Parry Smith (b. 1818), and their son was Howard Parry Bell (1851–1908).

He was Postmaster of Dexter from 1849 to 1853; Supervisor of the Town of Brownville and President of the Village of Dexter in 1856 and 1857; and a member of the New York State Senate (18th D.) from 1860 to 1865, sitting in the 83rd, 84th, 85th, 86th, 87th and 88th New York State Legislatures. As a member of the New York State Senate, Bell served as Chairman of the Committee on Manufacturers and as a member of the Committee on Canals. He was a delegate to the New York State Constitutional Convention of 1867–68. In April 1868, he was appointed as Auditor of the Canal Department.

== Sources ==
- The New York Civil List compiled by Franklin Benjamin Hough, Stephen C. Hutchins and Edgar Albert Werner (1870; pg. 408 and 442f)
- Biographical Sketches of the State Officers and Members of the Legislature of the State of New York by William D. Murphy (1861; pg. 36ff)
- History of Brownville, Jefferson County, NY at Ray's Place
- Tremayne's Table of the Post-Offices in the United States (1850; pg. 115)
- Convention Manual (1867; pg. IX)

New York State Senate
Preceded by Joseph A. Willard	New York State Senate; 18th District; 1860–1865	Succeeded by John O'Donnell
