= Charles Stanford (politician) =

American politician

Charles Stanford (April 26, 1819 Watervliet (now Colonie), Albany County, New York – August 24, 1885) was an American merchant, newspaper publisher and politician from New York.

== Life ==
He was the son of Josiah Stanford (1795–1862) and Elizabeth (Phillips) Stanford (1791–1873). He attended the common schools, Prattsburg Academy, and Clinton Liberal Institute. Then he became a contractor, and took part in railroad constructions. He married Jane E. Page, and they had several children.

During the early 1850s, he and his brothers, among them future Governor Leland Stanford (1824–1893), went to California, and opened a trading company there. Charles later returned to New York, being in charge of the East Coast branch of the company. In 1861, he settled on a farm in Niskayuna, Schenectady County, New York.

He was a member of the New York State Assembly (Schenectady Co.) in 1864 and 1865. He was a delegate to the 1864 National Union National Convention in Baltimore. In 1865, he established the Schenectady Daily Union.

He was a member of the New York State Senate from 1866 to 1869, sitting in the 89th, 90th (14th D.), 91st and 92nd New York State Legislatures (15th D.).

He was buried at the Albany Rural Cemetery in Menands, New York.

== Sources ==
- The New York Civil List compiled by Franklin Benjamin Hough, Stephen C. Hutchins and Edgar Albert Werner (1870; pg. 444, 501 and 503)
- Life Sketches of the State Officers, Senators, and Members of the Assembly of the State of New York, in 1867 by S. R. Harlow & H. H. Boone (pg. 144ff)
- Stanford genealogy at Family Tree Maker

New York State Assembly
Preceded by John McShea Jr.	New York State Assembly; Schenectady County; 1864–1865	Succeeded by John C. Ellis
New York State Senate
Preceded by Orson M. Allaben	New York State Senate; 14th District; 1866–1867	Succeeded by George Beach
Preceded by Adam W. Kline	New York State Senate; 15th District; 1868–1869	Succeeded by Isaiah Blood
