= Perez H. Field =

American businessman and politician

Perez Hastings Field (October 27, 1820 – August 30, 1872) was an American businessman and politician from New York.

== Life ==
Field was born on October 27, 1820, in Geneva, New York, the son of David Field and Electa Hastings.

Field engaged in the grain business, dealing in grain in Geneva. He erected a grain elevator and owned a malthouse, and purchased grain from farmers on both sides of Seneca Lake.

In 1860, Field was elected to the New York State Assembly as a Republican, representing the Ontario County 1st District. He served in the Assembly in 1861, 1863, and 1864.

In 1869, Field married Clara Electa Eddy. They had two children, Alice Electa and William Perez.

Field died on the steamer Metis after it sank near Stonington, Connecticut on August 30, 1872. He was buried in Glenwood Cemetery in Geneva.

New York State Assembly
Preceded by Lewis Peck	New York State Assembly; Ontario County, 1st District; 1861	Succeeded by David Pickett
Preceded by David Pickett	New York State Assembly; Ontario County, 1st District; 1863-1864	Succeeded by Volney Edgerton
