= Charles M. Crandall =

American politician

Charles M. Crandall (April 11, 1826 – October 4, 1867) was an American medical doctor and politician from New York.

== Life ==
Crandall was born on April 11, 1826, in Belfast, New York, the son of Benjamin G. Crandall. He was left an orphan when he was six and was raised by his grandfather Samuel Van Campen of Amity.

Crandall studied medicine in Castleton Medical College in Vermont, graduating from there in 1850. He then began practicing medicine in Belfast. He served as treasurer and president of the County Medical Society and was a member of the State Medical Society. He was also town supervisor of Belfast in 1859 and 1860, and in 1862 he became examining surgeon of Allegany County.

During the American Civil War, Crandall offered his services to help the sick and wounded from the Battle of Fair Oaks and the Battle of Fredericksburg. Seeing the conditions there led him to believe in the necessity of sending medical agents to help the wounded, and in the 1863 New York State Medical Society meeting he proposed a resolution to appoint a medical agent to Washington to look after New York's sick and wounded. The resolution was presented to and passed by the Governor and Legislature. When two of his brothers were wounded outside of Atlanta in 1864, he came to their assistance and worked in Nashville and Louisville hospitals for several weeks. He was appointed Surgeon of the 141st New York Volunteer Infantry, with the unanimous vote from the regiment's officers. As he was only just nominated for re-election to the State Assembly, he declined. In April 1865, Governor Fenton appointed him New York Military Agent at City Point, Virginia. He also served as Visiting Agent of Military Hospitals and worked in the various hospitals of the Department of the Potomac.

In 1863, Crandall was elected to the New York State Assembly as a Republican, representing the Allegany County 1st District. He served in the Assembly in 1864, 1865, and 1867.

In 1854, Crandall married a daughter of Alvah Wood. His son, Floyd M., was a physician in New York City. Crandall was also a trustee of the Binghamton Inebriate Asylum and State Commissioner of Public Charities.

Crandall died on October 4, 1867. He was buried in Riverside Cemetery in Belfast.

New York State Assembly
Preceded by Alvah E. Cruttenden	New York State Assembly; Allegany County, 1st District; 1864-1865	Succeeded by William Wilson
Preceded by District Created	New York State Assembly; Allegany County; 1867	Succeeded by Silas Richardson
