= John C. Perry =

American judge

John C. Perry (April 21, 1832 in Forestburgh, Sullivan County, New York – April 14, 1884 in Brooklyn, Kings County, New York) was an American politician from New York.

== Life ==
He attended Monticello Academy. Then he studied law, was admitted to the bar in 1853, and commenced practice in Kingston. He was Assistant D.A. of Ulster County from 1854 to 1856. In 1857, he removed to Brooklyn.

He was a member of the New York State Assembly (Kings Co., 5th D.) in 1864 and 1865. He was Assistant United States Attorney for the Eastern District of New York from 1865 to 1866. Afterwards he resumed his private practice.

He was a member of the New York State Senate (2nd D.) in 1872 and 1873.

On March 25, 1884, he was appointed by President Chester A. Arthur as Chief Justice of the Supreme Court of Wyoming Territory, but died on the day before his planned departure for Cheyenne, Wyoming. He collapsed while walking across the Brooklyn City Hall Park, and died an hour later of "apoplexy" at his home in Brooklyn.

== Sources ==
- Life Sketches of Executive Officers and Members of the Legislature of the State of New York by William H. McElroy & Alexander McBride (1873; pg. 96ff) [e-book]
- City AND SUBURBAN NEWS in NYT on March 26, 1884
- OBITUARY; JUSTICE JOHN C. PERRY in NYT on April 15, 1884

New York State Assembly
Preceded by Theophilus C. Callicot	New York State Assembly; Kings County, 5th District; 1864–1865	Succeeded by William W. Goodrich
New York State Senate
Preceded by James F. Pierce	New York State Senate; 2nd District; 1872–1873	Succeeded by John W. Coe
