= George H. Andrews =

American newspaper editor and politician

George H. Andrews (September 3, 1821 New York City – November 18, 1885) was an American newspaper editor and politician from New York.

== Life ==
In 1836, he began to work for the Courier and Enquirer, and in 1848 became publisher and associate editor of the paper. In 1854 and 1856, he ran unsuccessfully for Congress. In 1858, he removed to Springfield, Otsego County, New York.

He was a member of the New York State Senate (20th D.) from 1864 to 1867, sitting in the 87th, 88th, 89th and 90th New York State Legislatures.

Afterwards he returned to New York City. He was appointed in 1869 as a City Commissioner of Taxes; was re-appointed under the new City Charter in 1872. He resigned the office on August 26, 1878, to take effect at the end of the month. Later he was vice president of the Mutual Life Insurance Company.

== Sources ==
- The New York Civil List compiled by Franklin Benjamin Hough, Stephen C. Hutchins and Edgar Albert Werner (1870; pg. 443f)
- Life Sketches of the State Officers, Senators, and Members of the Assembly of the State of New York, in 1867 by S. R. Harlow & H. H. Boone (pg. 67ff)
- George H. Andrews Nominated for Police Commissioner in NYT on March 6, 1874
- The Police Commissionership; Mr. Andrews Declines in NYT on March 17, 1874
- Resignation of Mr. Andrews in NYT on August 27, 1878
- Death of Mrs. G. H. Andrews in NYT on November 7, 1880
- Obituary Notes; Mrs. Mary Virginia Andrews Farley (his daughter), in NYT on October 20, 1900

New York State Senate
Preceded by George A. Hardin	New York State Senate; 20th District; 1864–1867	Succeeded by John B. Van Petten
