= Robert Christie Jr. =

American lawyer and politician

Robert Christie Jr. (March 10, 1824 Troy, Rensselaer County, New York – February 15, 1875) was an American lawyer and politician from New York.

== Life ==
He studied law with David L. Seymour and David Buel Jr., was admitted to the bar, and practiced in Troy in partnership with Buel. About 1847, Christie removed to New York City. In 1851, he married Frances Juliet Kelsey, and they had several children.

He was a member of the New York State Assembly (Richmond Co.) in 1859; and a member of the New York State Senate (1st D.) in 1864 and 1865.

In June 1874, Christie suffered a severe stroke, and also became ill with diphtheria. He died eight months later at his home in Clifton, Staten Island, following a bout of pneumonia.

== Sources ==
- The New York Civil List compiled by Franklin Benjamin Hough, Stephen C. Hutchins and Edgar Albert Werner (1870; pg. 443 and 490)
- Biographical Sketches of the State Officers and Members of the Legislature of the State of New York in 1859 by William D. Murphy (pg. 145)

New York State Assembly
Preceded by Eben W. Hubbard	New York State Assembly; Richmond County; 1859	Succeeded by Theodore C. Vermilye
New York State Senate
Preceded by Monroe Henderson	New York State Senate; 1st District; 1864–1865	Succeeded by Nicholas B. La Bau
