= James Gibson (New York state senator) =

American politician

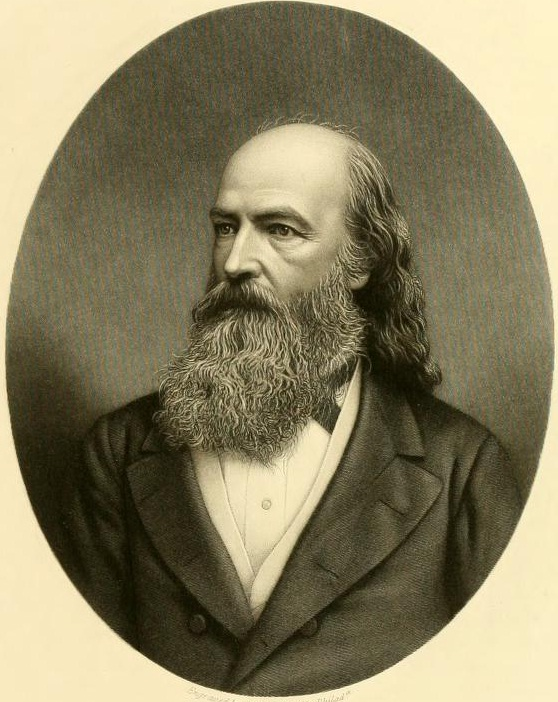
James Gibson (1878)

James Gibson (September 5, 1816 – 1897) was an American lawyer, newspaper editor and politician from New York.

== Life ==
He was born on September 5, 1816, in Salem, Washington County, New York, the son of James Brown Gibson (died 1827) and Margaret (Townsend) Gibson (died 1825). He attended Washington Academy in Salem. He studied law with Samuel Stevens, was admitted to the bar in 1836, and practiced in Salem. From 1838 until the end of 1840, he published and edited the Washington County Post. On October 17, 1841, he married Jane Woodworth, and they had three children.

He entered politics as a Republican; and was Judge of the Washington County Court from 1852 to 1855. He was a member of the New York State Senate (12th D.) in 1866 and 1867; and was Chairman of the Committee on Claims. In 1872, he joined the Liberal Republican Party, and later became a Democrat.

He was Grand Master of the Grand Lodge of New York in from 1868 to 1870.

He died in 1897 in Salem, New York.

== Sources ==
- The New York Civil List compiled by Franklin Benjamin Hough, Stephen C. Hutchins and Edgar Albert Werner (1870; pg. 436 and 444)
- Life Sketches of the State Officers, Senators, and Members of the Assembly of the State of New York, in 1867 by S. R. Harlow & H. H. Boone (pg. 97ff)
- Gibson genealogy, and bio at Schenectady History

New York State Senate
Preceded by Frederick H. Hastings	New York State Senate; 12th District; 1866–1867	Succeeded by Francis S. Thayer
