= Patrick Keady =

American politician

Patrick Keady (June 26, 1832 – October 6, 1908) was an Irish-American Painter, politician, lawyer, and judge from New York.

== Life ==
Keady was born on June 26, 1832, in Mount Equity, County Roscommon, Ireland. Later he moved with his family to Correen, a village four miles from Ballinasloe, where his father leased a farm.

After his father died, Keady left school and worked on the family farm to support himself and his family. He immigrated to America in 1851 and became an apprentice to master painter Josiah T. Smith of Brooklyn. He could barely write his own name at the time, but he improved his literacy over time and regularly read the newspapers. He was able to support his mother and siblings, who immigrated to America themselves. After finishing his apprenticeship, he continued working in New York City as a painter, a job he was involved in for 15 years until health issues led him to leave the field. He then became a journalist, studying phonography for a year and getting a job in a New York daily newspaper.

In 1866, Keady was elected to the New York State Assembly as a Democrat, representing the Kings County 3rd District. He served in the Assembly in 1867 and 1868. In 1868, he was appointed Assistant Fire Marshal for the City of Brooklyn. In 1869, he was admitted to the bar. He was Fire Marshal in 1876, during the Brooklyn Theatre fire. He was also counsel in the Beecher-Tilton trial and the Merrigan murder trial. In 1899, he was appointed Judge of the Court of Special Sessions in Brooklyn.

Keady was married. His three sons were George C., John W., and Howard P.

Keady died at home from hardening arteries on October 6, 1908. He was buried in Calvary Cemetery.

New York State Assembly
Preceded by Morris Reynolds	New York State Assembly; Kings County, 3rd District; 1867-1868	Succeeded by Dennis O'Keeffe
