= Stephen K. Williams =

American politician (1819–1916)

Member of the New York State Senate from the 25th district
- In office January 1, 1864 – December 31, 1869
- Preceded by: Chauncey M. Abbott
- Succeeded by: William B. Woodin

Personal details
- Born: Stephen Keyes Williams; May 9, 1819 Bennington, Vermont, U.S.
- Died: March 29, 1916 (aged 96) Newark, New York, U.S.
- Party: Republican
- Spouse: Angelina Crane (m. 1846; died 1910)
- Children: 6
- Education: Union College
- Occupation: Politician, lawyer

Stephen Keyes Williams (May 9, 1819 Bennington, Bennington County, Vermont – March 29, 1916 Newark, Wayne County, New York) was an American lawyer and politician from New York.

== Life ==
He was the son of Richard Parks Williams MD (1784–1850) and Lucy (Fletcher) Williams (1792–1886). In 1823, the family removed to Wayne County, New York. He graduated from Union College in 1837. Then he studied law, was admitted to the bar in 1842, and practiced. On November 26, 1846, he married Angelina Crane (1826–1910), and they had six children.

He was District Attorney of Wayne County from 1851 to 1853; and a member of the New York State Senate (25th D.) from 1864 to 1869, sitting in the 87th, 88th, 89th, 90th, 91st and 92nd New York State Legislatures. He was a delegate to the 1864 National Union National Convention in Baltimore.

He edited 174 volumes of reports of the U.S. Supreme Court.

== Sources ==
- The New York Civil List compiled by Franklin Benjamin Hough, Stephen C. Hutchins and Edgar Albert Werner (1870; pg. 443f and 544)
- Life Sketches of the State Officers, Senators, and Members of the Assembly of the State of New York, in 1867 by S. R. Harlow & H. H. Boone (pg. 67ff)
- Williams genealogy at Bogausch.com
- Stephen K. Williams Dies at 97 in NYT on March 30, 1916

New York State Senate
Preceded by Chauncey M. Abbott	New York State Senate; 25th District; 1864–1869	Succeeded by William B. Woodin
