= Thomas Parsons (politician) =

American politician

Thomas Parsons (January 7, 1814 – February 10, 1873) was an American politician from New York.

== Life ==
Parsons was born in Chieveley, Berkshire, England. He attended the common schools and then became a shepherd. In 1832, he emigrated to the United States, and worked as a farm-hand in Wheatland. Four years later, he removed to Rochester where he engaged in the lumber trade and established sawmills.

An alderman of Rochester from 1851 to 1854, and in 1857 and 1858, Parsons was a Democratic member of the New York State Assembly (Monroe Co., 2nd D.) in 1858. He was then a Republican member of the New York State Senate (28th D.) in 1866 and 1867.

Parsons died in Rochester, New York, and was buried at the Mount Hope Cemetery, Rochester. State Senator Cornelius R. Parsons (1842–1901) was his son.

== Sources ==
- The New York Civil List compiled by Franklin Benjamin Hough, Stephen C. Hutchins and Edgar Albert Werner (1870; pg. 444 and 487)
- Life Sketches of the State Officers, Senators, and Members of the Assembly of the State of New York, in 1867 by S. R. Harlow & H. H. Boone (pg. 133ff)
- Horrible Railroad Accident at Rochester; ...Mr. James Parsons, brother of Ex-Alderman Thomas Parsons, ...was struck down by the locomotive... in NYT on November 16, 1855
- BY MAIL AND TELEGRAPH; Hon. Thomas Parsons...died yesterday morning... in NYT on February 11, 1873
- DEATH OF HON. THOMAS PARSONS in the Rochester Union and Advertiser on February 10, 1873, transcribed at RootsWeb

New York State Assembly
Preceded by John T. Lacey	New York State Senate; Monroe County, 2nd District; 1858	Succeeded by Elias Pond
New York State Senate
Preceded by George G. Munger	New York State Senate; 28th District; 1866–1867	Succeeded by Lewis H. Morgan
