= Alexander Robertson (New York politician) =

American politician

Alexander Robertson (January 7, 1825 – August 5, 1902) was an American businessman and politician from New York.

== Life ==
Robertson was born on January 7, 1825 in Warrensburg, New York. He moved with his family to Moreau, then Fort Edward.

When he was 17, Robertson left school to work on his father's farm. In 1848, he moved to Whitehall and worked in the transportation business. In 1855, he moved to Albany and continued the business, transporting merchandise to and from Northern New York and Canada. He also conducted an extensive commercial business.

In 1864, Robertson was elected to the New York State Assembly as a Democrat, representing the Albany County 3rd District. He served in the Assembly in 1865 and 1867. He was one of the originators of the bill to provide appropriations for a new New York State Capital.

Robertson's children were Alexander, Charles E., Richard R., Mrs. Charles Parish, Mrs. Albert Brumaghim.

Robertson died at home on August 5, 1902. He was buried in Albany Rural Cemetery.

New York State Assembly
Preceded by Thomas McCarty	New York State Assembly; Albany County, 3rd District; 1865	Succeeded by Clark B. Cochrane
Preceded by Clark B. Cochrane	New York State Assembly; Albany County, 3rd District; 1867	Succeeded by Jackson A. Sumner
