= Charles C. Montgomery =

American politician (1818–1888)

Charles C. Montgomery (August 19, 1818 in Madrid, St. Lawrence County, New York – November 7, 1888) was an American politician from New York.

== Life ==
He was the son of John Montgomery (c.1780–1843) and Mary (Bartholomew) Montgomery (c.1787–1843). He was a Justice of the Peace from 1842 to 1845; and Superintendent of Common Schools of Madrid in 1845. In October 1845, he resigned from office due to ill health, and spent the next eight months in South Carolina.

After his return he was again elected School Superintendent and Justice of the Peace. He studied law with James Redington at Waddington, and with D.A. Charles G. Myers at Ogdensburgh, was admitted to the bar in 1850, and practiced in the Village of Waddington. From 1851 to 1854, he engaged in mining near Sonora, California.

After his return, he was again elected School Superintendent; and was Supervisor of the Town of Madrid from 1857 to 1859. In 1859, the Town of Waddington (including the village) was separated from Madrid.

He was a member of the New York State Senate (17th D.) from 1860 to 1863, sitting in the 83rd, 84th, 85th and 86th New York State Legislatures. He was Supervisor of the Town of Waddington from 1865 to 1874.

He was buried at the Old Madrid Cemetery.

== Sources ==
- The New York Civil List compiled by Franklin Benjamin Hough, Stephen C. Hutchins and Edgar Albert Werner (1867; pg. 442f)
- Biographical Sketches of the State Officers and Members of the Legislature of the State of New York by William D. Murphy (1861; pg. 86ff)
- Old Madrid Cemetery inventory at RootsWeb
- History of Madrid, St. Lawrence County, NY at Ray's Place
- History of Waddington, St. Lawrence County, NY at Ray's Place

New York State Senate
Preceded by William A. Wheeler	New York State Senate; 17th District; 1860–1863	Succeeded by Albert Hobbs
