= John I. Nicks =

American politician

John I. Nicks (1822 Rhinebeck, Dutchess County, New York – 1897) was an American politician from New York.

== Life ==
He attended the common schools, and then was apprenticed to a tobacconist in Red Hook. He pursued this trade for a time in Brooklyn, and then removed to Ithaca where he was foreman of a large tobacco factory. In 1847, he removed to Elmira, where he opened a tobacco shop and manufactured cigars.

He was a Supervisor (2nd Ward) of the Village of Elmira in 1851, and later a trustee of the village, a member of the Board of Education, and Chief Engineer of the Fire Department. In 1862, he was appointed by President Abraham Lincoln as Tax Assessor for the 27th District of New York, and was removed from office by President Andrew Johnson in August 1866.

Nicks was mayor of Elmira from March 1865 to March 1867; and a member of the New York State Senate (27th D.) from 1867 to 1869, sitting in the 90th, 91st and 92nd New York State Legislatures.

== Burial ==
He was buried at the Woodlawn Cemetery in Elmira.

== Sources ==
- The New York Civil List compiled by Franklin Benjamin Hough, Stephen C. Hutchins and Edgar Albert Werner (1870; pp. 444 and 558)
- Life Sketches of the State Officers, Senators, and Members of the Assembly of the State of New York, in 1867 by S. R. Harlow & H. H. Boone (p. 127ff)
- "Removal of the Assessor of the Twenty-seventh District". The New York Times. August 29, 1866.

Political offices
Preceded by John Arnot, Jr.	Mayor of Elmira, New York; 1865–1867	Succeeded by Eaton N. Frisbie
New York State Senate
Preceded by Stephen T. Hayt	New York State Senate; 27th District; 1867–1869	Succeeded by Theodore L. Minier
