= John F. Hubbard Jr. =

American politician

John F. Hubbard

Member of the New York State Senate
- In office 1868–1871
- Preceded by: James Barnett
- Succeeded by: James H. Graham
- Constituency: 23rd District (Chenango, Schoharie, and Delaware counties)

Personal details
- Born: John Flavel Hubbard, Jr. October 14, 1822 Norwich, Chenango County, New York, U.S.
- Died: June 30, 1893 Norwich, Chenango County, New York, U.S.
- Party: Democratic
- Spouse: Josephine Henrietta Moore (m. 1866)
- Occupation: Newspaper editor, politician
- Known for: Editor of the *Chenango Union*, New York State Senator

John F. Hubbard (October 14, 1822 – June 30, 1893) was an American newspaper editor and politician from New York.

== Life ==
John Flavel Hubbard, Jr. was born on October 14, 1822, in Norwich, Chenango County, New York, the son of State Senator John Flavel Hubbard, Sr. (1795–1876) and Almira (Mead) Hubbard (1800-1878). He studied law, but did not go into practice. He married Josephine Henrietta Moore, September 5, 1866. She was a descendant of pilgrim William Bradford, who in 1620 came to America on the Mayflower.

At the age of twenty, he edited and published the Norwich Journal in association with his father, which he later published alone until October 1847 when he sold it to LaFayette Leal and James E. Sinclair, who changed the name to the Chenango Union. In 1847, Hubbard received an appointment in the War Department from U.S. Secretary of War William L. Marcy. He remained in Washington, DC holding various subordinate offices, until 1854 when he returned to Norwich. He was a delegate to the 1860 Democratic National Convention. June 1, 1863, he re-purchased the Chenango Union and published it until July 1, 1868, when he sold it to G. H. Manning.

In 1866, he received a recess appointment by President Andrew Johnson as Assessor of Internal Revenue for the 19th District of New York. The appointment was rejected by the U.S. Senate, and on February 18, 1867, Johnson nominated David L. Follett to the office.

In the fall of 1867, Hubbard was elected State Senator for the district composed of Chenango, Schoharie, and Delaware counties. He was re-elected in the fall of 1869, sitting in the 91st, 92nd, 93rd and 94th New York State Legislatures. (At the New York state election, 1872, he ran on the Democratic/Liberal Republican ticket for Canal Commissioner but was defeated by Republican Reuben W. Stroud. Hubbard was one of the Commissioners to propose revisions and amendments to the State Constitution held in 1874. During his two terms as State Senator, Hubbard won the esteem and friendship of the leading men of his party in both the State and Nation. He was frequently mentioned as a candidate for Governor and United States Senator, but he chose to retire from public office and devote his time to his family. John Flavel Hubbard died in Norwich, Chenango County, New York, on June 30, 1893.

== Sources ==
- The New York Civil List compiled by Franklin Benjamin Hough, Stephen C. Hutchins and Edgar Albert Werner (1870; pg. 444)
- Life Sketches of the State Officers, Senators, and Members of the Assembly of the State of New York in 1868 by S. R. Harlow & S. C. Hutchins (pg. 92f)
- Courts and Lawyers of New York: A History, 1609–1925 by Alden Chester & Edwin Melvin Williams (Vol. I; pg. 713ff, "The Constitutional Commission of 1872")

New York State Senate
Preceded by James Barnett	New York State Senate; 23rd District; 1868–1871	Succeeded by James H. Graham
