= Samuel Campbell (New York state senator) =

American politician

Samuel Campbell (February 14, 1809 Tarbolton, Ayrshire, Scotland – September 22, 1885 New York Mills, Oneida County, New York) was an American politician from Scotland.

== Life ==
In 1831, he came to the United States, and settled in New York Mills. There he worked at one of the mills, and became a partner in the company in 1847. He also engaged in farming and raised cattle. On June 22, 1832, he married Agnes Sinclair (1811–1905), and they had eight children.

He was Supervisor of the Town of Whitestown; and a delegate to the 1864 National Union National Convention in Baltimore.

He was a member of the New York State Senate (19th D.) from 1866 to 1869, sitting in the 89th, 90th, 91st and 92nd New York State Legislatures.

He died in his office from "apoplexy," and was buried at the Glenside Cemetery in New York Mills.

== Sources ==
- The New York Civil List compiled by Franklin Benjamin Hough, Stephen C. Hutchins and Edgar Albert Werner (1870; pg. 444)
- Life Sketches of the State Officers, Senators, and Members of the Assembly of the State of New York, in 1867 by S. R. Harlow & H. H. Boone (pg. 76ff)
- OBITUARY; SAMUEL CAMPBELL in NYT on September 23, 1885

New York State Senate
Preceded by Alexander H. Bailey	New York State Senate; 19th District; 1866–1869	Succeeded by George H. Sanford
