= Heman G. Button =

American politician

Member of the New York House of Representatives from the Cattaraugis district
- In office 1867–1868
- Preceded by: William McVey
- Succeeded by: Jonas K. Button

Personal details
- Born: May 1, 1817 Concord, New York, U.S.
- Died: September 18, 1894 (aged 77)

Heman G. Button (May 1, 1816 – September 18, 1894) was an American farmer and politician from New York.

== Life ==
Button was born on May 1, 1816, in Concord, New York, the son of Charles Button. The family moved to Machias, then part of Ischua, in 1817.

Button was a farmer, although he also taught in school in the winter for 14 years. He was town superintendent of common schools from 1843 to 1847, Justice of the Peace from 1851 to 1863, Justice of Sessions in 1852, Town Supervisor in 1854 and 1866, and Superintendent of the Poor from 1846 to 1850 and from 1858 to 1863. He was also Inspector of Schools and Elections, Assessor and Highway Commissioner, and held a number of town and county offices for decades. He also served as loan commissioner for seven years, a notary public, and railroad commissioner for the town. He was a trustee of the Ten Broeck Free Academy.

Button was originally a Whig, but he joined the Republican Party immediately after it was formed. In 1866, he was elected to the New York State Assembly as a Republican, representing the Cattaraugus County 1st District. He served in the Assembly in 1867.

In 1838, Button married Jerusha Joslin. Their seven children were Daniel W., Kingsley, Millard Fillmore, Naomi, Alvira L., Adell, and Ida. Jerusha died in 1856, and later that year Button married widow Sarah M. Hall.

Button died on September 18, 1894. He was buried in Maple Grove Cemetery in Machias.

New York State Assembly
Preceded by William McVey	New York State Assembly; Cattaraugus County, 1st District; 1867	Succeeded by Jonas K. Button
