= Palmer E. Havens =

American politician

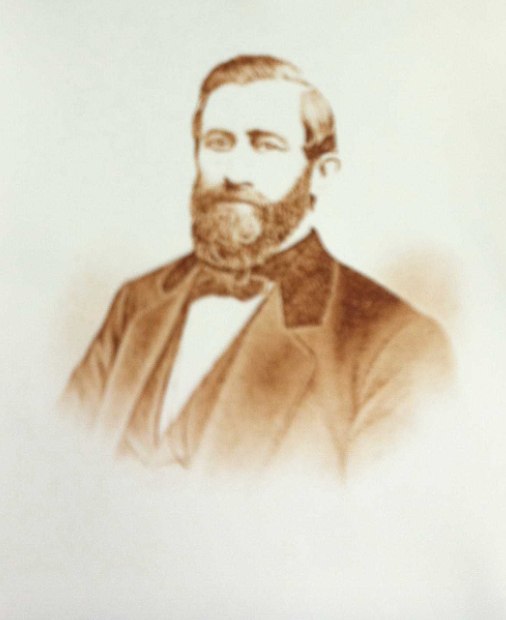
His portrait hanging in the Essex town hall.

Palmer Edward Havens (November 24, 1818 in Moriah, Essex County, New York – September 4, 1886 in Essex, Essex Co., NY) was an American politician from New York.

== Life ==
He was the son of Deacon John Havens (1791–1836) and Aurilla (Pratt) Havens (1785–1860). He attended the common schools, then taught school for ten years. At the same time, he studied law with Henry H. Ross, was admitted to the bar in 1843, and practiced in Essex. In 1841, he married Betsy E. Putnam (died 1872), and they had two children. He was at times Superintendent of Common Schools, Town Clerk, and Supervisor of the Town of Essex.

He was a member of the New York State Assembly (Essex Co.) in 1862 and 1863; of the New York State Senate (16th D.) in 1864 and 1865; and again of the State Assembly in 1867.

On February 17, 1873, he married Jane M. (Ismon) Edwards.

== Sources ==
- The New York Civil List compiled by Franklin Benjamin Hough, Stephen C. Hutchins and Edgar Albert Werner (1870; pg. 443, 495, 498 and 506)
- Biographical Sketches of the State Officers and the Members of the Legislature of the State of New York in 1862 and '63 by William D. Murphy (pg. 333f)
- Life Sketches of the State Officers, Senators, and Members of the Assembly of the State of New York in 1867 by S. R. Harlow & H. H. Boone (pg. 259ff)
- Obit transcribed at GenForum
- Havens genealogy at Family Tree Maker

New York State Assembly
Preceded by Martin Finch	New York State Assembly; Essex County; 1862–1863	Succeeded by William H. Richardson
Preceded by William H. Richardson	New York State Assembly; Essex County; 1867	Succeeded by Samuel Root
New York State Senate
Preceded by Russell M. Little	New York State Senate; 16th District; 1864–1865	Succeeded by Moss K. Platt
