= Edmund L. Pitts =

American politician

Edmund Pitts
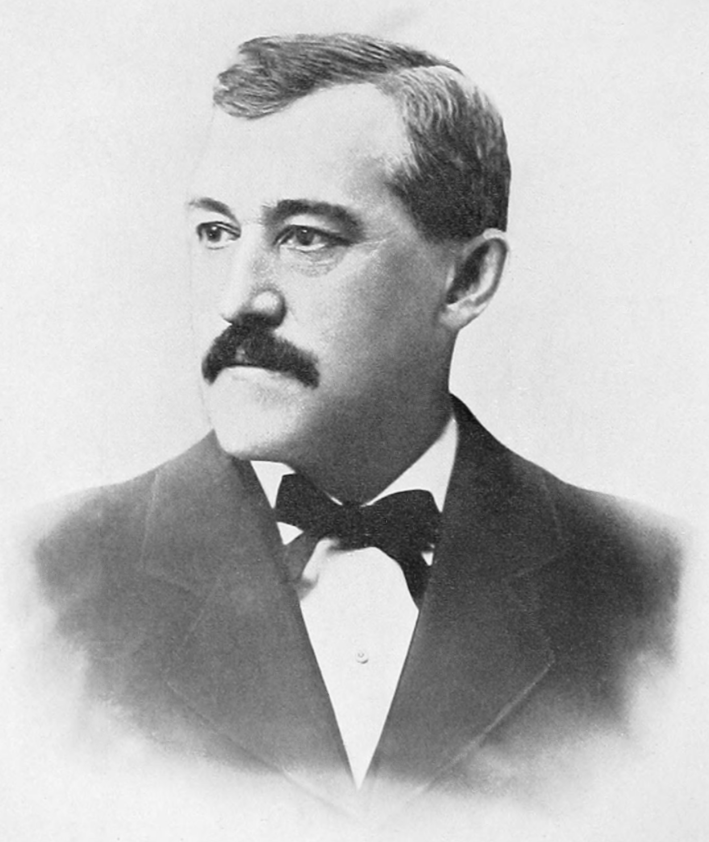

Member of the New York State Senate
- In office 1886–1887; 1880–1883

Member of the New York State Assembly
- In office 1864–1868

Personal details
- Born: Edmund Levi Pitts; May 23, 1839 Yates, New York, US
- Died: July 11, 1898 (aged 59) Medina, New York, US
- Children: 1
- Education: State and National Law School

Edmund Levi Pitts (May 23, 1839 – July 11, 1898) was an American lawyer and politician who served as a member of the New York State Assembly and New York State Senate.

== Early life and education ==
Pitts was born in Yates, New York, the son of John M. Pitts (1814–1907) and Mary Ann Clark Pitts (1820–1873). He was educated at Yates Academy, then studied law with Sanford E. Church at Albion, New York, and graduated from the State and National Law School in Ballston Spa, New York in 1860.

== Career ==
He was a member of the New York State Assembly in 1864, 1865, 1866, 1867 and 1868. In 1867, he was chosen Speaker of the New York State Assembly, at the age of 27 the youngest man ever to hold this office. He was a delegate to the 1868 Republican National Convention.

From May 1870 to June 1873, he was an Assessor of United States Revenue for Orleans County.

He was a member of the New York State Senate (29th D.) from 1880 to 1883, sitting in the 103rd, 104th, 105th and 106th New York State Legislatures. In May 1881, when Roscoe Conkling and Thomas C. Platt resigned their seats in the United States Senate, he opposed firmly their re-election. He was a delegate to the 1884 Republican National Convention.

He was again a member of the State Senate in 1886 and 1887, and was President pro tempore.

== Personal life ==
He married Una E. Stokes (1843–1920) on December 9, 1862. Their only child was Grace M. Pitts (1867–1900). Pitts died in Medina, New York. He was buried at Boxwood Cemetery in Ridgeway, New York.

New York State Assembly
Preceded by John Parks	New York State Assembly; Orleans County; 1864–1868	Succeeded by Marvin Harris
Political offices
Preceded by Lyman Tremain	Speaker of the New York State Assembly; 1867	Succeeded by William Hitchman
New York State Senate
Preceded by Lewis S. Payne	New York State Senate; 29th District; 1880–1883	Succeeded by Charles S. Baker
Preceded by Charles S. Baker	New York State Senate; 29th District; 1886–1887	Succeeded by Donald McNaughton
Political offices
Preceded by Dennis McCarthy	President pro tempore of the New York State Senate; 1886–1887	Succeeded by Henry R. Low
