= Albert Hobbs =

American politician

Albert Hobbs (August 1822 in Ogdensburg, St. Lawrence County, New York – April 11, 1897 in Malone, Franklin County, New York) was an American lawyer and politician from New York.

== Life ==
He practiced law in Malone. He married Caroline Virginia Magee (c.1829–1891).

He was a Know Nothing member of the New York State Assembly (Franklin Co.) in 1856.

He was a Republican member of the New York State Senate (17th D.) in 1864 and 1865.

He was Judge of the Franklin County Court from 1867 to 1878. In 1884, he ran for presidential elector on the Republican ticket (pledged to James G. Blaine), but New York was carried by Democrat Grover Cleveland.

He was buried at the Morningside Cemetery in Malone.

== Sources ==
- The New York Civil List compiled by Franklin Benjamin Hough, Stephen C. Hutchins and Edgar Albert Werner (1870; pg. 443 and 482)
- OFFICIAL VOTE OF THE COUNTY in NYT on November 20, 1884
- Obituary Notes; ALBERT HOBBS... in NYT on April 13, 1897

New York State Assembly
Preceded by Edward Fitch	New York State Assembly; Franklin County; 1856	Succeeded by George Mott
New York State Senate
Preceded by Charles C. Montgomery	New York State Senate; 17th District; 1864–1865	Succeeded by Abel Godard
