= Harman H. Vanderzee =

19th century American politician

Harman H. Vanderzee (born 1804-05) was an American politician who attended the 88th New York State Legislature.

== Life ==
Vanderzee was born in 1804 or 1805. He was a farmer and lived in Feura Bush. During the 88th New York State Legislature, he represented the 1st district of Albany County. He was a Democrat, and was elected by a margin of 1,611 votes.

New York State Assembly
Preceded by Harris Parr	New York State Assembly; Albany County, 1st District; 1865	Succeeded by William Aley
