= Christian B. Woodruff =

American politician (1828–1871)

Christian B. Woodruff (26 March 1828, New York City - 23 November 1871, NYC) was an American politician from New York.

== Life ==
He was a member of the New York State Assembly (New York Co., 3rd D.) in 1859, 1860 and 1861.

He was a member of the New York State Senate (4th D.) from 1862 to 1865, sitting in the 85th, 86th, 87th and 88th New York State Legislatures.

On May 5, 1864, Woodruff was appointed by New York City Comptroller Matthew T. Brennan to the Board of Tax Commissioners. The incumbent commissioners refused to go out of office, and the imbroglio was taken through the courts for a few months.

== Sources ==
- The New York Civil List compiled by Franklin Benjamin Hough, Stephen C. Hutchins and Edgar Albert Werner (1870; pg. 443, 489, 491 and 494)
- Biographical Sketches of the State Officers and the Members of the Legislature of the State of New York in 1862 and '63 by William D. Murphy (1863; pg. 117ff)
- Appointment of Commissioners of Taxes; An Imbroglio in NYT on May 6, 1864
- LAW REPORTS; The Williamson Contempt Case; Mr. Williamson Must Deliver Up the Books and Papers, or Be Remanded to Custody in NYT on July 20, 1864
- THE TROUBLE IN THE TAX COMMISSIONERS' OFFICE; A SEARCH WARRANT ISSUED; SEVERAL LOST BOOKS RECOVERED BY THE POLICE in NYT on July 25, 1864

New York State Assembly
Preceded by Richard Winne	New York State Assembly; New York County, 3rd District; 1859–1861	Succeeded by George L. Loutrel
New York State Senate
Preceded by John McLeod Murphy	New York State Senate; 4th District; 1862–1865	Succeeded by Benjamin Wood
