= James Barnett (New York politician) =

American politician (1810–1874)

James Barnett (May 18, 1810 Orange County, Vermont – July 23, 1874 Oneida, Madison County, New York) was an American politician from New York.

== Life ==
The family removed to Madison County, New York, in 1817. James attended the common schools, and worked on his father's farm. In 1832, he became a merchant's clerk, and in 1836 opened his own business in Fayetteville, Onondaga County. On March 23, 1836, he married Julia Ann Rich (1816–1848), and they had five children. In 1838, he removed to Peterboro. On December 25, 1848, he married Ellen King (1812–1874), and they had two daughters.

He entered politics as a Democrat; became a friend of Gerrit Smith and was a member of the Liberty Party; and joined the Republican Party upon its foundation.

He was Supervisor of the Town of Smithfield in 1846 and 1847; and a member of the New York State Assembly (Madison Co., 2nd D.) in 1860. He was elected a Justice of the Peace in 1860; and was a member of the New York State Senate (23rd D.) in 1866 and 1867.

== Sources ==
- The New York Civil List compiled by Franklin Benjamin Hough, Stephen C. Hutchins and Edgar Albert Werner (1870; pg. 444)
- Life Sketches of the State Officers, Senators, and Members of the Assembly of the State of New York, in 1867 by S. R. Harlow & H. H. Boone (pg. 71ff)
- Peterboro Village Cemetery records transcribed at RootsWeb
- Blog about James Barnett
- History of Smithfield, NY at Ray's Place

New York State Assembly
Preceded by Noah M. Coburn	New York State Assembly; Madison County, 2nd District; 1860	Succeeded by Francis A. Hyatt
New York State Senate
Preceded by Frederick Juliand	New York State Senate; 23rd District; 1866–1867	Succeeded by John F. Hubbard Jr.
