= Elijah McKinney Glen =

American politician (1807–1879)

Member of the New York State Assembly from the 2nd District of Wayne County, New York
- In office January 7 – April 11, 1868 (resigned)
- Preceded by: Ornon Archer
- In office January 5 – May 11, 1869
- Succeeded by: Amasa Hall

Personal details
- Born: August 12, 1807 Amsterdam, New York Galway, New York
- Died: October 14, 1879 (aged 72)

Elijah McKinney Glen (August 12, 1807 – October 14, 1879) was an American politician and abolitionist who was a member of the New York State Assembly.

Glen was born in 1807 in Amsterdam, New York to Scottish parents. He studied to become a shoemaker.

Glen became active in the abolitionist movement in 1834. For fifteen years, he travelled around the country giving lectures. In the late 1840s, he was lecturer for the New York Antislavery Society. When he was twenty-one, Glen married, and would have six children. During the last forty years of his life, he lived in Montgomery County, New York, and for twenty years in Macedon, New York. Glenn served as a keeper at Sing Sing Prison, and was in 1861 to 1866, the postmaster of Macedon.

He helped organize the Liberty Party, which he supported until switching to the Republican Party in 1850. Glen was elected a member of the New York State Assembly from the first district of Cayuga County.

In 1868, Glen accused Alexander Frear of attempting to bribe him on the topic of the Erie Railroad. On April 10, a select committee appointed to investigate concluded that "the evidence does not furnish any justification for the charges made by Mr. Glenn [sic] against Mr. Frear." Thereupon a resolution was passed to censure Glen. On April 11, Glen resigned his seat. In November, he was re-elected, and took his seat again in January 1869.
