= Abel Godard =

American politician

Abel Godard (June 26, 1835 in Richville, St. Lawrence County, New York – July 25, 1891) was an American lawyer, Union Army officer, manufacturer, banker and politician from New York.

== Life ==
He was the son of Assemblyman Harlow Godard (1804–1896) and Mary Ann (Rich) Godard (1804–1889). He graduated from University of Rochester in 1859, and from Albany Law School in 1861. He married Helen M. Herring (1838–1910), and they had three children.

He fought with the 60th Regiment of New York Volunteers in the American Civil War, taking part in the battles of Antietam, Gettysburg, Lookout Mountain, Ringgold Gap, Resaca, Dallas and Peachtree Creek. He was honorably discharged as a colonel in September 1864.

He Supervisor of the Town of De Kalb; and a member of the New York State Senate (17th D.) in 1866 and 1867.

He was again Supervisor of the Town of De Kalb from 1879 to 1881; and a member of the New York State Assembly (St. Lawrence County, 1st D.) in 1882 and 1883.

He was buried at the Wayside Cemetery in Richville.

== Sources ==
- The New York Civil List compiled by Franklin Benjamin Hough, Stephen C. Hutchins and Edgar Albert Werner (1870; pg. 444)
- Life Sketches of the State Officers, Senators, and Members of the Assembly of the State of New York, in 1867 by S. R. Harlow & H. H. Boone (pg. 100ff)
- History of De Kalb, NY at Ray's Place
- Obit transcribed from the Gouverneur Northern Tribune on August 1, 1891 [with portrait]

New York State Senate
Preceded by Albert Hobbs	New York State Senate; 17th District; 1866–1867	Succeeded by Abraham X. Parker
New York State Assembly
Preceded by Daniel Peck	New York State Assembly; St. Lawrence County, 1st District; 1882–1883	Succeeded by N. Martin Curtis
