= Stephen Haynes =

American politician

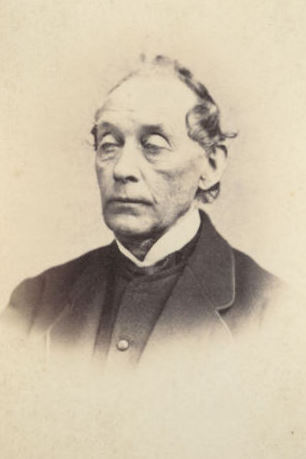
Stephen Haynes 1867

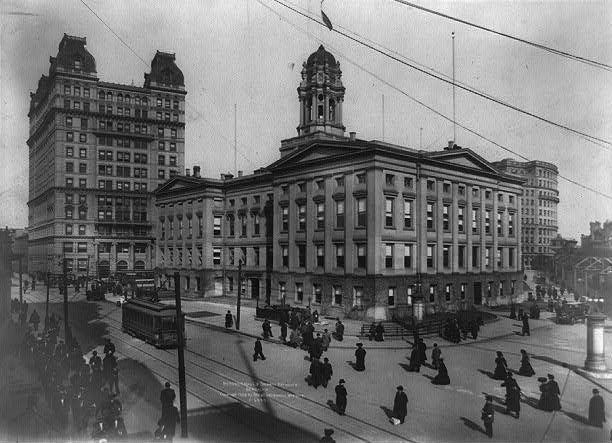
Photograph, circa 1908 Historic American Buildings Survey archive

Stephen Haynes (1801 – December 28, 1879) was an American politician from New York.

== Life ==
Stephen Haynes was born in Bridgehampton, New York. At the age of 12 he was a drummer-boy in the War of 1812. His father (David) was a captain in the War of 1812, and took a prominent part in repelling the attack of the British troops upon Sag Harbor. Stephen became an apprentice mason in the city of Newburgh, New York and after mastering his trade he settled in Brooklyn in 1822, when the population of Brooklyn did not exceed 5,000.

He was a builder of houses and later responsible as supervisor for the building of the Brooklyn City Hall (now Brooklyn Borough Hall) the Raymond Street Jail in 1873, and the Washington Street M.E. church (1831), where he also was a member of the board or trustees. He was also contractor of Fort Green Park.

Haynes also organized the first uniformed militia company in Brooklyn, the Village Guards. He subsequently became Colonel of this militia; his commission signed by Martin Van Buren as governor, dated 1828. He was also a long-standing commissioner on the board that established and built Prospect Park. Haynes also served as member of the Board of Education, and also Trustee of Public School No. 5 for many years.

Haynes was a Democratic member of the New York State Assembly in 1865 (Kings Co., 3rd D.), and in 1867 (Kings Co., 4th D.).

He was also associated with business as a director of the Atlantic and Long Island banks, trustee of the Dime Savings Bank, and of the Nassau and other insurance companies.

Stephen Haynes died at his home in Brooklyn at the age of 78, interment was at the Green-Wood Cemetery, Brooklyn.
