= Alexander Olcott =

19th century American politician

Alexander Olcott (August 10, 1829 – April 21, 1887) was an American politician who served as a member of the New York State Legislature in 1864 and 1865.

== Life ==
Olcott was born on August 10, 1829, in Corning, New York. He married Catherine Amanda Olcott in 1856. The couple had two children, Marvin and Mary. He died in 1887 at the age of 57, and was buried in South Corning.

New York State Assembly
| Preceded by Henry Sherwood | New York State Assembly; Steuben County, 2nd District; 1864–1865 | Succeeded by Amaziah S. McKay |
