= Victor M. Rice =

American politician

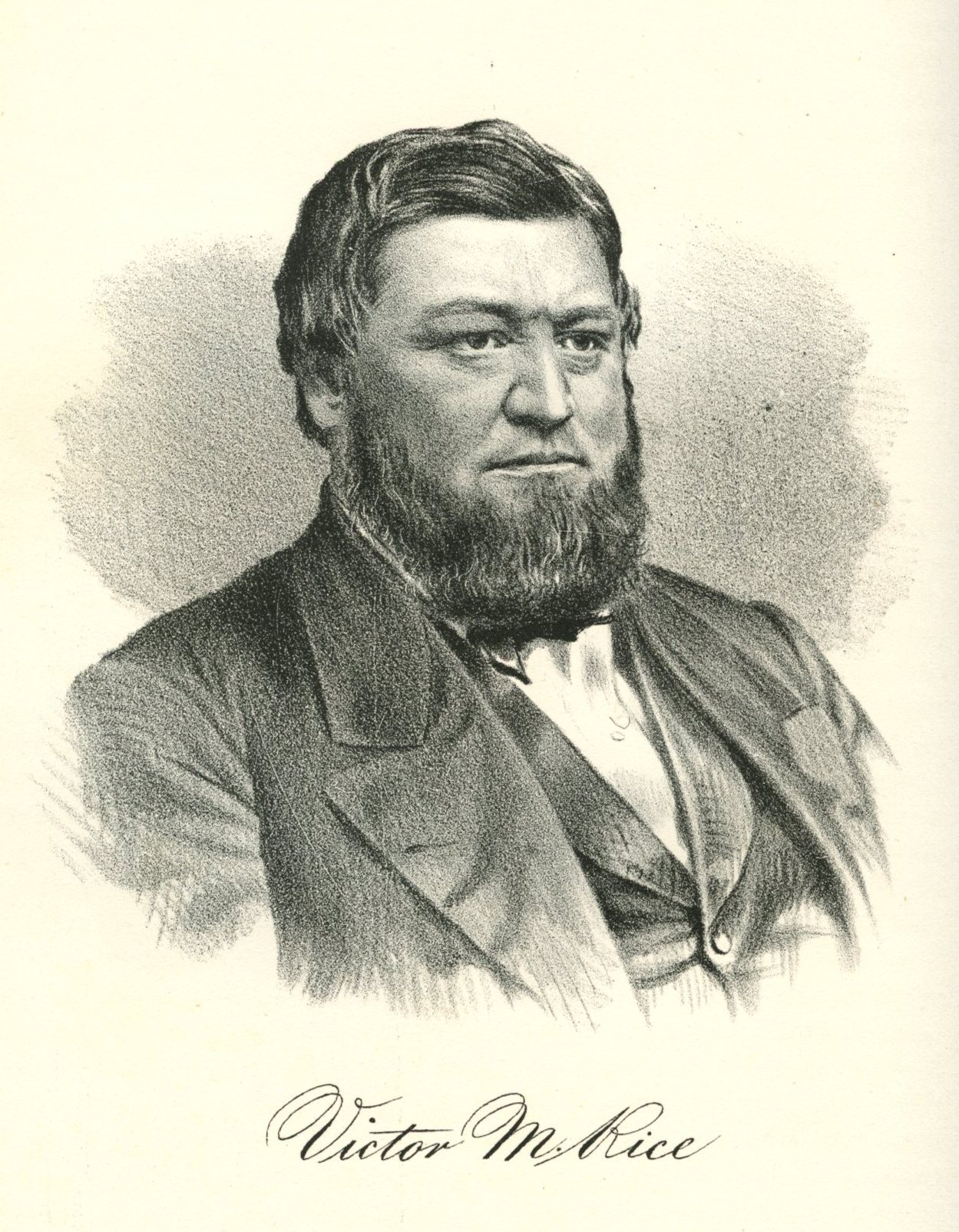

Victor Moreau Rice (April 5, 1818 Mayville, Chautauqua County, New York – October 18, 1869 Oneida, Madison County, New York) was an American educator and politician from New York.

== Life ==
Rice was born 5 March 1818 in Mayville, New York to state assemblyman William Rice (1787–1864) and Rachel (Waldo) Rice (1790–1854). He was a direct patrilineal descendant of Edmund Rice an early immigrant to Massachusetts Bay Colony. He graduated from Allegheny College in 1841, and then taught school in Mayville. Soon after he began to study law, first in Mayville, then with Millard Fillmore in Buffalo, was admitted to the bar in 1845, but did not practice. While studying law in Buffalo, he continued to teach school. On November 27, 1846, he married Maria Louisa Winter (1820–1916), and they had nine children.

In 1847, he became the editor of the Buffalo Cataract, later renamed Western Temperance Standard. He continued to teach school, and was City Superintendent of Schools, and President of the New York State Teachers Association. On April 4, 1854, the 77th New York State Legislature elected Rice to a three-year term as State Superintendent of Public Instruction. He was a member of the New York State Assembly (Erie Co., 2nd D.) in 1861. On January 30, 1862, the 85th New York State Legislature elected Rice again as Superintendent of Public Instruction. He was re-elected in 1865. In 1868, he became President of the American Life Insurance Company, and later President of the Metropolitan Bank of New York City.

Rice died suddenly on 17 October 1869 while returning home from New York City, and was buried at the Forest Lawn Cemetery, Buffalo.

== Sources ==
- The New York Civil List compiled by Franklin Benjamin Hough, Stephen C. Hutchins and Edgar Albert Werner (1870; pg. 411ff and 493)
- Biographical Sketches of the State Officers and the Members of the Legislature of the State of New York in 1862 and '63 by William D. Murphy (1863; pg. 38ff)
- OBITUARY; Hon. Victor M. Rice in NYT on October 20, 1869

Political offices
Preceded by new office	New York State Superintendent of Public Instruction; 1854–1857	Succeeded by Henry H. Van Dyck
Preceded by Emerson W. Keyes; Acting	New York State Superintendent of Public Instruction; 1862–1868	Succeeded by Abram B. Weaver
New York State Assembly
Preceded by Henry B. Miller	New York State Assembly; Erie County, 2nd District; 1861	Succeeded by Horatio Seymour
