= William Henry Gleason (New York politician) =

American politician (1833–1892)

William Henry Gleason (September 28, 1833 – February 21, 1892) was an American minister and politician.

Gleason, eldest son of Rev. Henry Gleason and Cynthia Stanton (née Vandervoort) Gleason Havens, was born on September 28, 1833, in Durham, Connecticut, where his father (who died in 1839) was pastor of the Congregational Church. He entered Yale College from Sag Harbor, New York. He graduated in 1853 and was a member of Skull and Bones.

He studied law in Sag Harbor, where he was admitted to the bar and practiced law until 1870, by which date he had acquired one of the largest legal practices on Long Island. In 1864 and '65 he was a Republican member of the New York Assembly, and in 1868 was a candidate for US Congress. From 1868 to 1870 he served as Register in Bankruptcy.

He then exchanged the legal for the clerical profession, and having been ordained accepted the pastorate of the Reformed (Dutch) Church in Newburgh, New York. He resigned this charge in 1876, and was next settled (in 1877) over the First Reformed Church in Newark, New Jersey. The degree of Doctor of Divinity was conferred upon him by Rutgers College in 1881. In 1887 he removed to the Reformed Church in Hudson, New York, but his health compelled him to resign in 1889, and his death occurred at his residence in New York City on February 21, 1892, aged 58.

He was married to Ellen A. Gladwin, of Deep River, in the township of Saybrook, Connecticut on November 11, 1857. She died on July 23, 1875, having borne him three daughters and three sons, of whom two sons and a daughter died in infancy. He was next married, on December 27, 1876, to Leila E. Seward, daughter of the Rev. Dr. Dwight M. Seward of New York City, who survived him with one son, besides the children of his former marriage.

This article incorporates public domain material from the 1892 Yale Obituary Record.

New York State Assembly
Preceded by Benjamin F. Wiggins	New York State Assembly; Suffolk County, 1st District; 1864–1865	Succeeded by James H. Tuthill
