= Alexander Frear =

American politician

Member of the New York State Assembly
- In office 1866–1872

Personal details
- Born: 1820
- Died: May 22, 1882 (aged 61–62)

Alexander Frear (1820 – May 22, 1882) was an American politician. He served as a councilman in New York City, and later an Alderman. He was elected to the New York State Assembly, and later in his life became the Commissioner of Emigration and Commissioner of Public Charities for New York City.

A Huguenot whose family immigrated from France, Frear was born on August 18, 1820; in Poughkeepsie, New York, where he received his schooling. In 1848, he founded an importing house 'Alexander Frear & Company'. The business was relatively successful until it went bankrupt in 1857. After the bankruptcy, Frear became involved in politics, getting elected to the New York City Council. In 1860, he was elected an alderman of New York. In 1865, and later 1866, he was elected to the New York State Assembly, where he served as William M. Tweed's spokesperson.

New York State Assembly
Preceded by John McDonald	New York State Assembly; New York County, 11th District; 1866	Succeeded by John V. Gridley
Preceded by Edward H. Anderson	New York State Assembly; New York County, 15th District; 1867–1872	Succeeded by Joseph Blumenthal
