= Ira Shafer =

New York attorney and politician

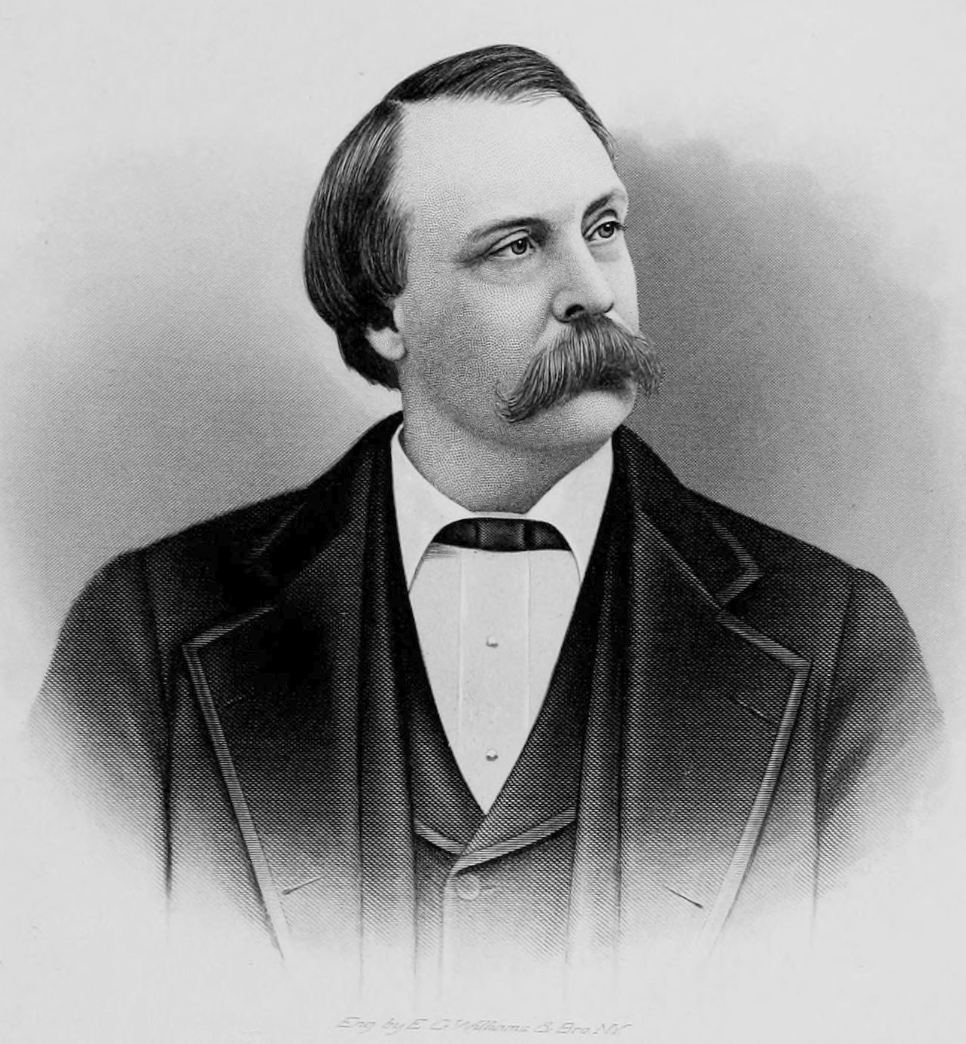

Member of the New York State Senate
- In office 1864–1865
- Constituency: 13th District

Personal details
- Born: March 9, 1831 Berne, New York
- Died: November 30, 1896 (aged 65) Highland, New York
- Party: Democratic
- Occupation: Lawyer, politician

Ira Shafer (March 9, 1831 – November 30, 1896) was a New York attorney and politician.

== Life and career ==
Ira Shafer was born in Berne, New York on March 9, 1831. He lived in California in the early 1850s. Upon returning to New York he studied law, was admitted to the bar in 1853 and practiced in Albany.

A Democrat, Shafer served as Albany County District Attorney from 1859 to 1862.

Shafer served in the New York State Senate from 1864 to 1865 as the representative of the 13th Senate District.

He died in Highland on November 30, 1896.

New York State Senate
Preceded by John V. L. Pruyn	New York State Senate; 13th District; 1864–1865	Succeeded by Lorenzo D. Collins
