= E. Curtis Topliff =

19th century American politician

E. Curtis Topliff (1829/30–1895) was an American businessman and politician.

== Life ==
Topliff was born in 1829 or 1830 to some of the first settlers of Chautauqua County, New York. While his family was relatively poor, Topliff was ambitious and went to Jamestown to study law. It was around this time when the California Gold Rush began, and so Topliff ceased his studies to travel west in 1851. He spent three years there and then traveled to Chile to mine for silver. Upon returning home, he started a lumber business. During this time, he was a member of the Democratic Party, but became a Republican in 1854 due to new territorial policies. In 1863, he was elected supervisor of Salamanca and was reelected twice. It was in 1865 that he became a member of the New York State Assembly. He died in 1895 and was buried along with his wife, Frances, in Conewango.

New York State Assembly
Preceded by Albert G. Dow	New York State Assembly; Cattaraugus County, 2nd District; 1865-1868	Succeeded by William H. Stuart
