= Abram B. Weaver =

American politician

Abram B. Weaver (1830-1908) was a member of the New York State Assembly. He was one of the original members of the Cornell University Board of Trustees. He was born on December 18, 1830, in Deerfield, New York. He received his education at public schools, Utica Academy, and Hamilton College. Weaver graduated in 1851, and was admitted to the bar two years later, in 1853. In 1856, he served as the supervisor of schools in Oneida County, and from 1863 to 1865, he served in the New York State Assembly. In his last year, he was the Democratic candidate for Speaker of the House. In 1865, the Cornell University Board of Trustees named him as one of the first trustees of the Board. Weaver served two terms as New York State Superintendent of Public Instruction, and ran for Congress in 1870. He died June 8, 1908.

New York State Assembly
Preceded by Charles M. Scholefield	New York State Assembly; Oneida County, 1st District; 1863-1865	Succeeded by George Graham
