= Augustus C. Hand =

American judge (1803–1878)

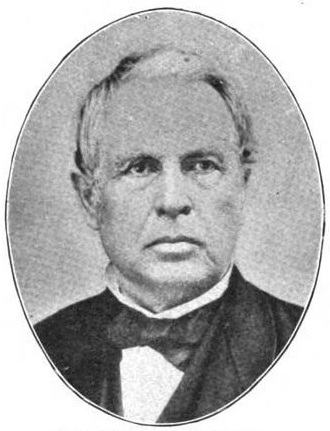
Augustus C. Hand, congressman and judge

Augustus Cincinnatus Hand (September 4, 1803 in Shoreham, Addison County, Vermont – March 8, 1878 in Elizabethtown, Essex County, New York) was an American lawyer, jurist and politician from New York. He served one term in the U.S. House of Representatives from 1839 to 1841, and was also a justice on the New York Supreme Court from 1847 to 1855.

Both his son, Samuel, and grandson, Learned Hand, became prominent judges in their own rights.

== Life ==
He studied law in at Litchfield Law School. He was admitted to the bar in 1828, and commenced practice at Crown Point, New York. He removed to Elizabethtown in 1831, and was Surrogate of Essex County from 1831 to 1839.

=== Congress ===
Hand was elected as a Democrat to the 26th United States Congress, and served from March 4, 1839, to March 3, 1841.

=== State legislature ===
He was a member of the New York State Senate from 1845 to 1847, sitting in the 68th, 69th and 70th New York State Legislatures.

=== New York Supreme Court ===
He was a justice of the New York Supreme Court (4th District) from 1847 to 1855, and ex officio a judge of the New York Court of Appeals in 1855. Afterwards he resumed the practice of law.

=== Later career and death ===
He was a delegate to the 1868 Democratic National Convention. He resumed the practice of his profession.

He was buried in the family cemetery in Elizabethtown, New York.

=== Family legacy ===
His son Samuel Hand (1834–1886) was an Associate Judge of the New York Court of Appeals and his grandson Learned Hand (1872–1961) was a Senior Judge in the United States Court of Appeals for the Second Circuit. State Senator Matthew Hale (1829–1897) was married to his daughter Ellen S. Hand (c. 1835 – 1867).

U.S. House of Representatives
Preceded by John Palmer	Member of the U.S. House of Representatives from New York's 13th congressional district 1839–1841	Succeeded by Thomas A. Tomlinson
New York State Senate
Preceded by Sidney Lawrence	New York State Senate; Fourth District (Class 2); 1845–1847	Succeeded by district abolished
