= Stanton v. United States =

American legal case

- Court: United States Court of Appeals for the Second Circuit
- Full case name: Alden D. Stanton and Louise M. Stanton v. United States of America
- Argued: May 14, 1959
- Decided: July 6, 1959
- Citation: 268 F.2d 727 (2d Cir. 1959)

Case history
- Subsequent history: On remand, 186 F. Supp. 393 (E.D.N.Y. 1960)

Court membership
- Judges sitting: Learned Hand, Thomas Walter Swan, Carroll C. Hincks

Case opinions
- Majority: Hand, joined by Swan
- Dissent: Hincks

Laws applied
- Internal Revenue Code

Stanton v. United States, 268 F.2d 727 (2d Cir. 1959), was a United States income tax case in the United States Court of Appeals for the Second Circuit.

== Background ==
=== Facts ===
Plaintiff husband managed the property of the Trinity Church (Manhattan) until a corporation was formed which took over that work. Plaintiff husband then became that corporation's president, and all of his time was spent caring for the corporation's real estate. When plaintiff husband resigned, the corporation gave him a gratuity in appreciation of his services. He was provided $20,000. He had to waive all his retirement and pension benefits.

=== Tax returns ===
Plaintiffs admitted that gratuity on their income tax returns, but did not include it as income because it was a gift.

The tax commissioner decided that it was income and assessed a tax deficiency, which plaintiffs paid, and thereafter filed a claim for a refund. Defendant denied that claim.

=== Tax court ===
The trial court held in plaintiffs' favor.

== Opinion of the court ==
The court held that the test of compensation was whether what was added was by way of more compensation for a deserving employee or merely to satisfy the employer's desire to become a benefactor. Here, because plaintiff husband's duties were exclusively financial, and there was no evidence that personal affection entered into the payment, it could be assumed that the payment was the result of the corporation's satisfaction for services. Trial court's judgment reversed and remanded.

Judgment in plaintiffs' favor holding that the gratuity received by plaintiffs' was not taxable as income reversed and remanded where there was no evidence which indicated that the compensation paid to plaintiff husband by the corporation for which he worked was based on anything other than the corporation's satisfaction for the services rendered by plaintiff husband.
