= Martin Finch =

American politician

Martin Finch (June 21, 1811 – December 21, 1890) was an American lawyer and politician from New York.

== Life ==
Finch was born on June 21, 1811, in Jay, New York, the son of William Finch and Rachel Smith.

Finch worked on a farm until he was almost 21, when he moved to Bennington, Vermont to study. In 1833, he began attending Williams College in Williamstown, Massachusetts. After his first term of sophomore year, he spent a few months teaching in Westfield Academy. Shortly after returning to school, he got typhus fever and lived in his father's home in Peru, New York until the spring of 1834, when he returned to college. While in Williams, he was a member of the Kappa Alpha Society. He graduated from Williams in 1837, after which he worked as an assistant teacher in the Auburn Academy and in Victory until 1840. While teaching, he began studying law in the office of D. Robinson in Port Byron. After finishing teaching, he moved to Keeseville and began studying law under T. A. Tomlinson. After Tomlinson was elected to Congress, Finch managed the office during most of Tomlinson's term. He was admitted to the bar in 1842, after which he formed a partnership with Tomlinson until the latter's retirement four years later. He then continued to practice law in Keeseville. He later practiced law with Ira S. Smith, followed by F. A. Rowe. He retired from active practice in around 1889, when his health began to decline. By 1885, he was the senior lawyer in Essex County.

Finch was originally a Whig, but he left that party in 1854 and joined the American Party. In 1859, he was elected to the New York State Assembly as a Republican, representing Essex County. He served in the Assembly in 1860 and 1861. He served as town supervisor of Chesterfield from 1847 to 1852 and from 1856 to 1859. He was district attorney of Essex County from 1864 to 1867. In 1885, he was the town's excise commissioner. In 1872, he was appointed Register in Bankruptcy for his Congressional district, and he held this office until at least 1880.

Finch was a member of the Congregational Church. In 1843, he married Caroline Jackson. They had eight children, only two of whom were still alive in 1880. One son, Rev. Henry O. of Guilford, Connecticut, died from heart disease in a nearby beach while on a morning walk. By the time Finch died, his surviving children were Abbie and Carrie.

Finch died at home following a serious hip fracture from slipping down on December 21, 1890.

New York State Assembly
Preceded by Monroe Hall	New York State Assembly; Essex County; 1860–1861	Succeeded by Palmer E. Havens
