= United States v. Drescher =

American legal case

- Court: United States Court of Appeals for the Second Circuit
- Full case name: United States v. Drescher
- Argued: January 5, 1950
- Decided: February 16, 1950
- Citations: 179 F.2d 863; 50-1 USTC (CCH) ¶ 9186

Case history
- Prior history: 84 F. Supp. 228 (W.D.N.Y. 1949)

Court membership
- Judges sitting: Learned Hand, Thomas Walter Swan, Charles Edward Clark

Case opinions
- Majority: Swan, joined by Hand
- Concur/dissent: Clark

Laws applied
- Internal Revenue Code

United States v. Drescher, 179 F.2d 863 (2nd Cir. 1950) was a United States income tax case before the Second Circuit. The Court held as follows:

- The value of the employer-purchased annuities in question was taxable as part of taxpayer's gross income in the year in which the annuities were purchased.

- The annuities in question were nonassignable, and possession was retained by the employer until taxpayer reached age of retirement; and the employee's compensation was not reduced during these years, nor did he have election to receive in cash the amount paid.

== Facts ==
A corporation, anticipating its executive's retirement, purchases an "endowment policy," entitling him (the policy-holder) to a lump-sum-certain when he retires in 15 years.

== Held ==
The executive must include the premium immediately, as his "basis" for his new policy.

== Academic commentary ==
The stakes for the government are as follows:

- Due to the declining present value of future money, a taxpayer pays less in taxes if he can defer his tax payment.
- In the case of this endowment policy:
  - If the Premium = $B, the [lump sum] will be $[B*(1+i)^Y].
  - If deferral is permitted, the executive's tax savings = (marginal rate R)*[lump sum]
- Reasons in favor of deferral: it was issued to the company in the interim; and, unlike the stock bonus above, his rights are nonforfeitable: he can't sell/borrow against it, nor can he be denied it by being fired.
- Reasons against deferral: it names him as the beneficiary; he should feel better off at issuance—and he certainly consented to the policy purchase in lieu of salary (e.g. as consideration).
