= Kenan v. Commissioner =

US Court Case

- Court: United States Court of Appeals for the Second Circuit
- Decided: August 7, 1940
- Citation: 114 F. 2d 217 (2d Cir. 1940)

Court membership
- Judges sitting: Thomas Walter Swan, Augustus Noble Hand, Harrie B. Chase

Case opinions
- Majority: Hand, joined by Swan, Chase

Laws applied
- Internal Revenue Code

In Kenan v. Commissioner, 114 F. 2d 217 (2d Cir. 1940), the United States Court of Appeals for the Second Circuit provided a broad definition of the term "sale or exchange." The Kenan court reviewed the Commissioner's finding of a $367,687.12 deficiency in the income taxes of the trustees. The trustees or taxpayers contended "that the delivery of the securities of the trust estate to the legatee was a donative disposition of property . . . and that no gain was thereby realized." The court pointed out that "the trustees had the power to determine whether the claim should be satisfied [in cash or securities]." Thus, "[i]f it were satisfied by a cash payment securities might have been sold on which . . . a taxable gain would necessarily have been realized." The court found that "[t]he word 'exchange' does not necessarily have the connotation of a bilateral agreement which may be said to attach to the word 'sale.'" The court then held that the trustees or taxpayers had realized a gain when they used the securities to satisfy the claim on the estate.

== Implications ==
The fact that the court adopted a fairly broad definition of "sale or exchange" with regard to capital gains and losses is good for taxpayers with regard to realized gains, but bad for taxpayers with regard to realized losses. This is because of the way that ordinary income and ordinary losses are treated relative to the way that capital gains and capital losses are treated.

It should also be noted that § 1001,"determination of amount of and recognition of gain or loss," provides a definition for "sale or disposition of property," which is broader than § 1222's "sale or exchange" definition, as "sale or exchange" are not the only ways to dispose of property.
