= Julius A. Willcox =

American judge (1879–1932)

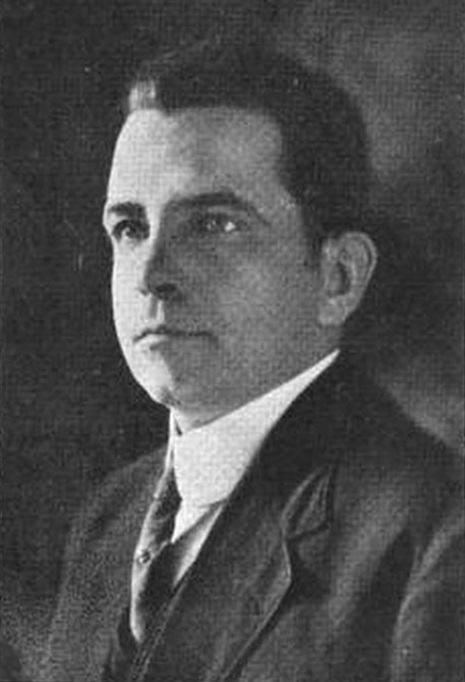
From 1919's Vermont, Its Government, by Walter J. Bigelow

Julius A. Willcox (October 2, 1879 – July 2, 1932) was a Vermont educator, attorney, and judge. A longtime administrator in Vermont's state government, he is most notable for his service as an associate justice of the Vermont Supreme Court from 1929 to 1931.

== Early life ==
Julius Abner Willcox was born in Bridport, Vermont on October 2, 1879, the son of Edwin Willcox and Alice (Miner) Willcox. He was educated in Bridport, and Crown Point and Port Henry, New York. He graduated from Middlebury College in 1902, and became a school teacher and administrator.

After deciding on a legal career, Willcox studied law in the Ludlow office of William W. Stickney and John G. Sargent. He was admitted to the bar in 1908, and practiced in Ludlow.

== Political career ==
Willcox was also active in politics and government as a Republican, including serving as the reporter of debates for the Vermont Senate in 1906, second assistant clerk of the Vermont House of Representatives in 1908 and 1910, first assistant clerk in 1912, 1915, and 1917, and clerk in 1919. In 1915 and 1916, Willcox was an assistant to the commission that revised Vermont's statutes, and in 1917 he was one of the editors who published the updated and compiled version.

In 1921, Willcox was appointed Secretary of Civil and Military Affairs (chief assistant) to Governor James Hartness. In addition, he served on Hartness' military staff with the rank of major.

== Judicial career ==
After the August 1921 death of Zed S. Stanton, Hartness appointed Willcox to fill the resulting vacancy as a judge on the Vermont Superior Court. Willcox served until 1929 and advanced by seniority to become the Superior Court's chief judge.

In keeping with Vermont's tradition of promoting the chief judge of the Superior Court as state Supreme Court vacancies arose, in February 1929, Willcox was elected an associate justice of the Vermont Supreme Court by the Vermont General Assembly, succeeding Harrie B. Chase following Chase's appointment as a federal judge. He remained on the court until 1931, when he resigned due to ill health. He was succeeded by Warner A. Graham.

== Death and burial ==
Willcox died in Plymouth, Vermont on July 2, 1932. He was buried at Plymouth Notch Cemetery in Plymouth.

== Family ==
In 1909, Willcox married Annie Maria Brown (1886-1948) of Ludlow. They were the parents of three daughters, Marian Elizabeth (1910-2000), Dorothy Ellen (1915-2010), and Joanne (1922-1998). They were also the parents of a son, Edwin James (1921-1996). Annie Willcox was chairwoman of the Plymouth Republican Committee, and served in the Vermont House of Representatives.

== Sources ==
=== Books ===
- Bigelow, Walter J. (1919). Vermont, Its Government. Montpelier, VT: Historical Publishing Company.
- Bryant, Blanche (1962). A Record of the Descendants of James Smith Brown and Polly Maria (Taylor) Brown. Tangerine, FL: Blanche Brown Bryant.
- Crockett, Walter Hill (1923). Vermont, The Green Mountain State. Vol. 5. New York, NY: Century History Company.
- Wiley, Edgar J. (1917). Catalogue of Officers and Students of Middlebury College. Middlebury, VT: Middlebury College.

=== Newspapers ===
- "15,000 Spectators Line City Streets". Hartford Courant. Hartford, CT. August 18, 1921 – via Newspapers.com.
- "Votes to Support Willcox". Burlington Free Press. Burlington, VT. January 26, 1929 – via Newspapers.com.
- "Julius A. Willcox Elected to Vermont Supreme Bench". Burlington Free Press. Burlington, VT. February 8, 1929 – via Newspapers.com.
- "Associate Justice Willcox Resigns from Supreme Court". Burlington Free Press. Burlington, VT. Associated Press. October 1, 1931 – via Newspapers.com.
- "W. A. Graham is Named to the Supreme Bench". Burlington Free Press. Burlington, VT. October 7, 1931 – via Newspapers.com.
- "Justice Willcox". Burlington Free Press. Burlington, VT. July 4, 1932 – via Newspapers.com.
- "Mrs. Ann Willcox, Former Legislator, Dies at Age of 62". Burlington Free Press. Burlington, VT. November 29, 1948 – via Newspapers.com.
- "Obituary, Joanne Willcox Martin". Hartford Courant. Hartford, CT. January 16, 1998.
- "Obituary, Dorothy E. Yates". Rutland Herald. Rutland, VT. December 29, 2010.

=== Internet ===
- Gebo, Annmarie (Assistant Town Clerk, Middlebury, VT) (March 28, 2000). "Vermont Death Records, 1909-2008, Entry for Marian Willcox Patterson". Ancestry.com. Provo, UT: Ancestry.com, LLC.
- Camm, Frank (March 6, 1996). "Memorial, Edwin J. Willcox Jan. 1943". apps.westpointaog.org. West Point, New York: West Point Association of Graduates.

Political offices
Preceded by Harrie B. Chase	Justice of the Vermont Supreme Court; 1929–1931	Succeeded by Warner A. Graham
