= Matthew Hale (New York politician) =

American politician (1829–1897)

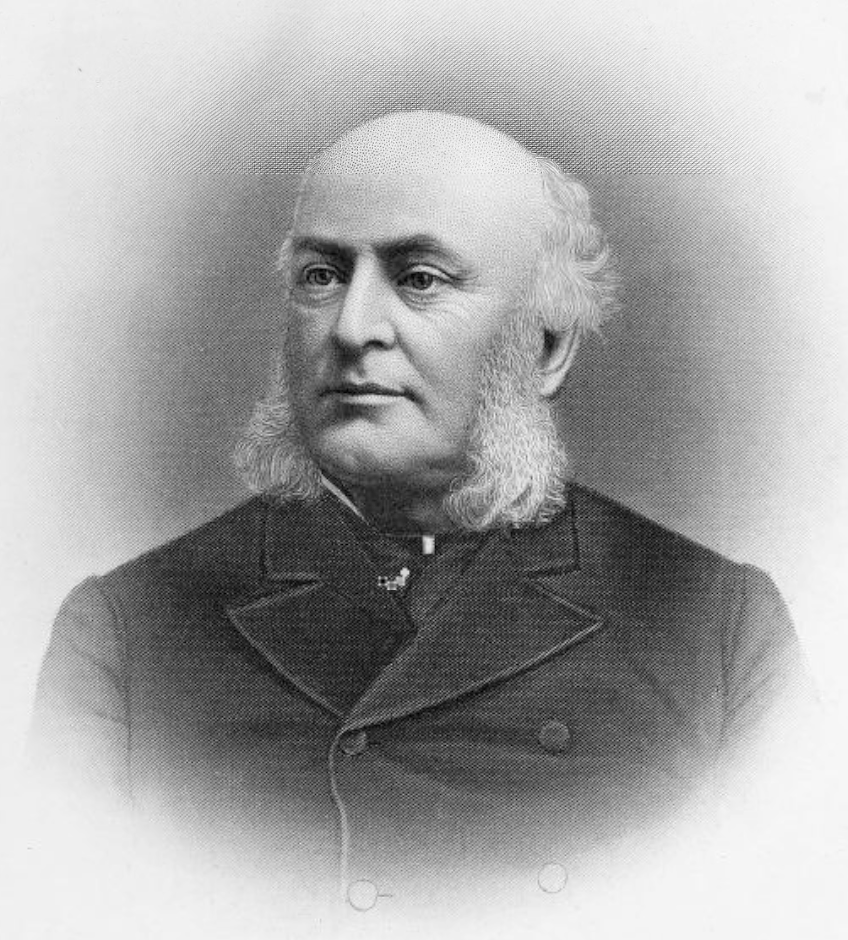

Member of the New York State Senate
- In office 1868–1869

Personal details
- Born: June 20, 1829 Chelsea, Vermont
- Died: March 25, 1897 (aged 67) Albany, New York
- Spouses: Ellen S. Hand (m. 1856; died 1867) Mary Lee (m. 1877)
- Children: Matthew Hale
- Education: University of Vermont
- Occupation: Lawyer, politician

Matthew Hale (June 20, 1829 – March 25, 1897) was an American lawyer and politician from New York.

== Life ==
Matthew Hale was born in Chelsea, Vermont on June 20, 1829. He graduated from the University of Vermont in 1851. Then he studied law with his brother Robert S. Hale (1822–1881) and Orlando Kellogg in Elizabethtown, New York, was admitted to the bar in 1853, and commenced practice in Poughkeepsie. In 1856, he married Ellen S. Hand (c. 1835–1867).

In 1859, he moved to New York City. In 1863, he returned to Elizabethtown, and practiced law in partnership with his father-in-law Augustus C. Hand (1803–1878). Hale was Supervisor of the Town of Elizabethtown in 1864 and 1865; a delegate to the New York State Constitutional Convention of 1867–68; and a member of the New York State Senate (16th D.) in 1868 and 1869.

Afterwards he remained in Albany, and practiced law there with his brother-in-law Samuel Hand (1833–1886), and Charles S. Fairchild. In December 1877, Hale married Mary Lee, and they had five children. In 1883, the University of Vermont conferred on him an honorary degree of LL.D. In 1886, he was appointed by Governor David B. Hill to a three-member State commission to find a more humane alternative to hanging. Two years later they recommended electrocution.

Matthew Hale died at his home in Albany on March 25, 1897.

== Ancestors ==
Matthew Hale was the grandson of Nathan Hale, a colonel in the American army during the American Revolutionary War.

New York State Senate
Preceded by Moss K. Platt	New York State Senate; 16th District; 1868–1869	Succeeded by Christopher F. Norton
