= United States v. Alcoa =

American legal case

- Court: United States Court of Appeals for the Second Circuit
- Full case name: United States v. Aluminum Co. of America
- Decided: March 12, 1945
- Citation: 148 F.2d 416

Court membership
- Judges sitting: Learned Hand, Thomas Walter Swan, Augustus Noble Hand

Case opinions
- Majority: L. Hand, joined by a unanimous court

Laws applied
- Sherman Antitrust Act

United States v. Alcoa, 148 F.2d 416 (2d Cir. 1945), is a landmark decision concerning United States antitrust law. Judge Learned Hand's opinion is notable for its discussion of determining the relevant market for market share analysis and—more importantly—its discussion of the circumstances under which a monopoly is guilty of monopolization under section 2 of the Sherman Antitrust Act.

== Facts ==
In April of 1937, the Justice Department charged Alcoa with illegal monopolization and demanded that the company be dissolved. Trial began on June 1, 1938. The trial judge dismissed the case four years later. The government appealed. Two years later in 1944, the Supreme Court announced that, owing to recusal of several of its judges, it could not assemble a quorum to hear the case, and Congress passed a special act allowing the case to be assigned for final decision to Hand's court, the U.S. Court of Appeals for the Second Circuit. In the following year, Learned Hand wrote the opinion for the Second Circuit.

Alcoa argued that if it was in fact deemed a monopoly, it acquired that position honestly, through outcompeting other companies through greater efficiencies. The Department of Justice argued that, apart from what it characterized as attempts or intent to monopolize, Alcoa's mere possession of the power to control prices and curb competition was an illegal monopoly per se under both sections 1 and 2 of the Sherman Act.

== Judgment ==
Judge Learned Hand held that he could consider only the percentage of the market in "virgin aluminum" for which Alcoa accounted. Alcoa had argued that it was in the position of having to compete with scrap. Even if the scrap was aluminum that Alcoa had manufactured in the first instance, it no longer controlled its marketing. But Hand defined the relevant market narrowly in accord with the prosecution's theory. Hand applied a rule concerning practices that are illegal per se. It did not matter how Alcoa became a monopoly, since its offense was simply to become one. In Hand's words,

It was not inevitable that it should always anticipate increases in the demand for ingot and be prepared to supply them. Nothing compelled it to keep doubling and redoubling its capacity before others entered the field. It insists that it never excluded competitors; but we can think of no more effective exclusion than progressively to embrace each new opportunity as it opened, and to face every newcomer with new capacity already geared into a great organization, having the advantage of experience, trade connections and the elite of personnel.

Hand acknowledged the possibility that a monopoly might just happen, without anyone's having planned for it. If it did, then there would be no wrong, no liability, and no need to remedy the result. But that acknowledgement has generally been seen as an empty one in the context of the rest of the opinion, because rivals in a market routinely plan to outdo one another, at the least by increasing efficiency and appealing more effectively to actual and potential customers. If one competitor succeeds through such plans to the extent of 90% of the market, that planning can be described given Hand's reasoning as the successful and illegal monopolization of the market.

== Significance ==
Hand remanded the matter to the trial court for a determination of the remedy. In 1947, Alcoa made the argument to the court that there were two effective new entrants into the aluminum market – Reynolds and Kaiser – as a result of demobilization after the war and the government's divestiture of defense plants. In other words, the problem had solved itself and no judicial action would be required. On this basis, the district court judge ruled against divestiture in 1950, but the court retained jurisdiction over the case for five years, so that it could look over Alcoa's shoulder and ensure that there was no re-monopolization.

Until 1950, Alcoa was concerned with its domestic market, while its Canadian subsidiary Aluminium Company of Canada, Limited (Alcan) took care of the international markets. Alcoa, Reynolds, and Kaiser were soon joined in the growing market by Anaconda Aluminum Company, a subsidiary of the copper-industry giant. In 1958 Harvey Machine Tools Company began primary aluminum production, marking the end of Alcoa's monopoly over the process which had led to its domination of the American market.

Future Federal Reserve chairman Alan Greenspan criticized United States v. Alcoa as a young man in 1966, in an essay published in Capitalism: The Unknown Ideal. In it, he argues that antitrust law should only condemn coercive monopolies:

ALCOA is being condemned for being too successful, too efficient, and too good a competitor. Whatever damage the antitrust laws may have done to our economy, whatever distortions of the structure of the nation's capital they may have created, these are less disastrous than the fact that the effective purpose, the hidden intent, and the actual practice of the antitrust laws in the United States have led to the condemnation of the productive and efficient members of our society because they are productive and efficient.

== See also ==
- US antitrust law
