= Thomas Walter Swan =

American judge (1877–1975)

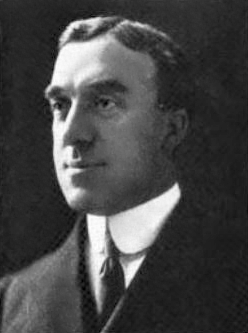

Senior Judge of the United States Court of Appeals for the Second Circuit
- In office July 1, 1953 – July 13, 1975

Chief Judge of the United States Court of Appeals for the Second Circuit
- In office 1951–1953
- Preceded by: Learned Hand
- Succeeded by: Harrie B. Chase

Judge of the United States Court of Appeals for the Second Circuit
- In office December 22, 1926 – July 1, 1953
- Appointed by: Calvin Coolidge
- Preceded by: Henry Wade Rogers
- Succeeded by: Carroll C. Hincks

Personal details
- Born: December 20, 1877 Norwich, Connecticut, U.S.
- Died: July 13, 1975 (aged 97) New Haven, Connecticut, U.S.
- Education: Yale University (BA); Harvard University (LLB)

Thomas Walter Swan (December 20, 1877 – July 13, 1975) was a circuit judge of the United States Court of Appeals for the Second Circuit.

== Education and career ==
Born in Norwich, Connecticut Swan received an B.A. degree from Yale University in 1900. He graduated as a Bachelor of Laws from Harvard Law School in 1903. He was in private practice of law in Chicago, Illinois from 1903 to 1916. He was a lecturer in law at the University of Chicago from 1903 to 1904, and in 1908. He was Dean and Professor of Law at Yale Law School from 1916 to 1927.

== Federal judicial service ==
Swan was nominated by President Calvin Coolidge to a seat on the United States Court of Appeals for the Second Circuit vacated by Judge Henry Wade Rogers. He was confirmed by the United States Senate on December 22, 1926, and served as Chief Judge and as a member of the Judicial Conference of the United States from 1951 to 1953. He assumed senior status on July 1, 1953.

Swan died on July 13, 1975 at his home in New Haven, Connecticut at the age of 97.

=== Notable decisions as sitting judge ===
- Nichols v. Universal Pictures Corp. - 1930
- United States v. One Package of Japanese Pessaries - 1936
- United States v. Peoni - 1938
- Kenan v. Commissioner - 1940
- United States v. Crimmins - 1941
- United States v. Alcoa - 1945
- Farid-Es-Sultaneh v. Commissioner - 1947
- United States v. Drescher - 1950
- American Communications Ass'n v. Douds - 1950
- Wilko v. Swan - 1953
- Stanton v. United States - 1959

== See also ==
- List of United States federal judges by longevity of service

== Sources ==
- "Swan, Thomas Walter - Federal Judicial Center". www.fjc.gov.
- Gunther, Gerald (April 12, 1994). Learned Hand : the man and the judge. with a foreword by Lewis F. Powell, Jr. New York, NY: Knopf. ISBN 0-394-58807-X. LCCN 93022868. LCC KF373.H29 G76 1994. (biography of Learned Hand, Swan's fellow judge on the Second Circuit, contains extensive discussion of Swan)
- Marcia Nelson, The Remarkable Hands: An Affectionate Portrait (Federal Bar Foundation 1983)
- Marvin Schick, Learned Hand's Court (Johns Hopkins 1970)

Academic offices
Preceded by Henry Wade Rogers	Dean of Yale Law School; 1916–1927	Succeeded by Robert Maynard Hutchins
Legal offices
Preceded by Henry Wade Rogers	Judge of the United States Court of Appeals for the Second Circuit; 1926–1953	Succeeded by Carroll C. Hincks
Preceded by Learned Hand	Chief Judge of the United States Court of Appeals for the Second Circuit; 1951–1953	Succeeded by Harrie B. Chase
