= Frank L. Fish =

American judge (1863–1927)

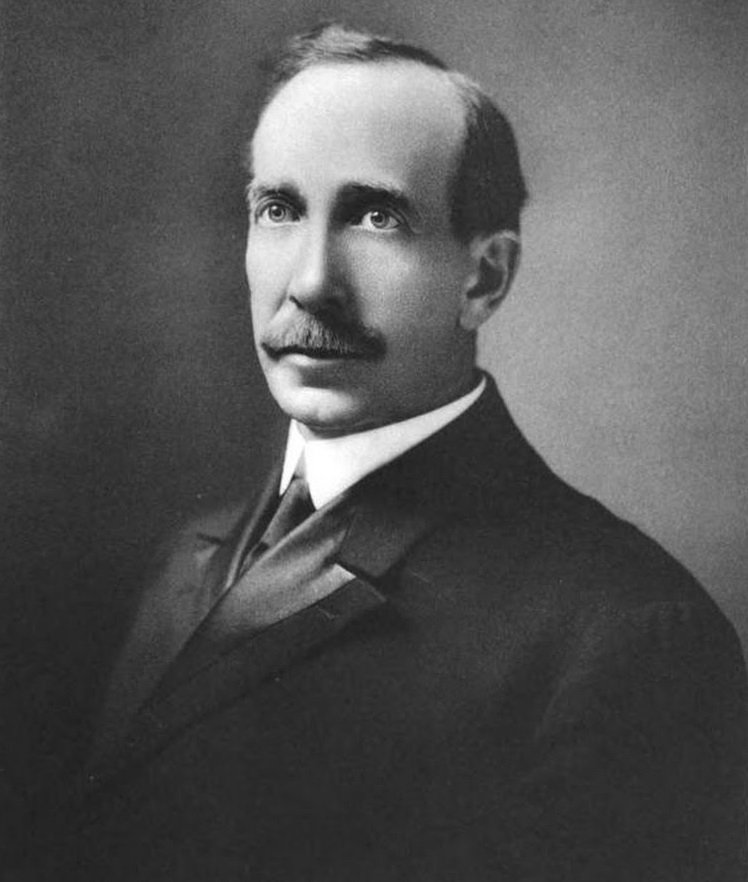
From 1912's Encyclopedia of Vermont Biography

Frank Leslie Fish (September 17, 1863 – September 7, 1927) was a Vermont attorney and judge. He was most notable for his service as an associate justice of the Vermont Supreme Court from 1926 to 1927.

== Early life ==
Frank L. Fish was born in Newfane, Vermont on September 17, 1863, the son of Sarah Moore Gates and Frederick Appleton Fish. He studied at Leland and Gray Academy in Townshend and the Vermont Academy in Saxtons River. After his 1886 graduation, Fish taught school in Londonderry, and began to study law, first with Milon Davidson of Newfane, and later with Addison E. Cudworth of Londonderry. Fish studied with James Manning Tyler of Brattleboro until Tyler's appointment as a judge, after which he completed his studies under Lavant M. Read of Bellows Falls. While studying under Reed, Fish served as register of probate for Windham County, and edited the Bellows Falls Times newspaper. Fish was admitted to the bar in 1889, and practiced in Windham County until locating to Vergennes in 1890, where he continued to practice law.

== Start of career ==
A Republican, from 1890 to 1896, Fish served as the collector of taxes for both the Vergennes city government and its school district. He served as state's attorney of Addison County from 1891 to 1900. Fish resigned as state's attorney to accept a federal appointment as a national bank examiner, a post which he held until 1908. In 1908, Fish became a candidate for the Republican nomination for Congress in Vermont's 1st District, but withdrew after local party caucuses indicated a preference for incumbent David J. Foster, who was renominated and reelected. He was elected to the Vermont House of Representatives in 1908, and served from 1908 to 1909.

Fish served as a trustee of Norwich University and Middlebury College. He also edited a memorial volume on Horace W. Bailey (1852-1914), a resident of Newbury, Vermont who served as a member of the Vermont House of Representatives, a member of the state railroad commission, and the U.S. Marshal for Vermont. In 1911, Norwich University conferred on Fish the honorary degree of Master of Arts.

== Judicial career ==
In 1912, Fish was appointed as a judge of the Vermont Superior Court, succeeding Alfred A. Hall. He remained on the court until 1926.

In April 1926, Fish was appointed to succeed William H. Taylor as an associate justice of the Vermont Supreme Court. Fish remained on the court until his death, and was succeeded by Harrie B. Chase.

== Death and burial ==
Fish served on the court until his death. He died in at the home of his brother-in-law in Palmer, Massachusetts on September 7, 1927. Fish was buried at Prospect Cemetery in Vergennes.

== Family ==
On March 15, 1892, Fish married Mary Jane "Minnie" Lyon (1862-1949) of Waterbury, Vermont. Their children included: Sarah Katherine (1893-1995), the wife of William Atherton Knight; Frederick Lyon (1895-1980); and Prudence Hopkins (1902-2000), the wife of Stanley C. Bussey.

== Sources ==
=== Books ===
- Crockett, Walter Hill (1923). Vermont, The Green Mountain State. Vol. 5. New York, NY: Century History Company.
- Ellis, William Arba (1911). Norwich University, 1819-1911: Her History, Her Graduates, Her Roll of Honor. Vol. 3. Montpelier, VT: Capital City Press.

=== Magazines ===
- Forbes, C. S. (September 1901). "Vermont Men of Today: Hon. Frank Leslie Fish". The Vermonter. St. Albans, VT: Charles S. Forbes.

=== Newspapers ===
- "Fish Resigns Position: National Bank Examiner Will Devote Entire Attention to His Candidacy For Congress". St. Johnsbury Caledonian. St. Johnsbury, VT. May 27, 1908 – via Newspapers.com.
- "Fish Withdraws from the Field". Burlington Free Press. Burlington, VT. June 27, 1908 – via Newspapers.com.
- "Prouty Elected Governor By Old Time Republican Majority". Bennington Banner. Bennington, VT. September 2, 1908 – via Newspapers.com.
- "Judge Frank L. Fish". Vermont Phoenix. Brattleboro, VT. February 16, 1912 – via Newspapers.com.
- "Judge Fish To Succeed Taylor". Burlington Free Press. Burlington, VT. April 1, 1926 – via Newspapers.com.
- "Justice F. L. Fish Dies Suddenly". Burlington Free Press. Burlington, VT. September 8, 1927 – via Newspapers.com.
- "Justice F. L. Fish Goes To His Rest". Burlington Free Press. Burlington, VT. September 11, 1927 – via Newspapers.com.
- "Chase Named To Supreme Bench". Burlington Free Press. Burlington, VT. September 19, 1927 – via Newspapers.com.

=== Internet ===
- Smith, J. C. (Vergennes City Clerk) (March 15, 1892). "Vermont Vital Records, 1720-1908, Marriage Entry for Frank Leslie Fish and Mary "Minnie" Jane Lyon". Ancestry.com. Provo, UT: Ancestry.com, LLC.
- Smith, J. C. (Vergennes City Clerk) (October 2, 1893). "Vermont Vital Records, 1720-1908, Birth Entry for Sarah Katherine Fish". Ancestry.com. Provo, UT: Ancestry.com, LLC.
- Stone, George (Vergennes City Clerk) (September 6, 1917). "Vermont Vital Records, 1720-1908, Marriage Entry for Sarah Katherine Fish and William Atherton Knight". Ancestry.com. Provo, UT: Ancestry.com, LLC.
- "Connecticut Death Index, 1949-2001, Entry for Sarah Katherine Fish Knight". Ancestry.com. Provo, UT: Ancestry.com, LLC. April 18, 1995.
- "Vermont Death Records, 1909-2008, Entry for Frederick L. Fish". Ancestry.com. Provo, UT: Ancestry.com, LLC. April 17, 1980.
- "Connecticut Death Index, 1949-2012, Entry for Prudence B Bussey". Ancestry.com. Provo, UT: Ancestry.com, LLC. October 30, 2000.

Political offices
Preceded by William H. Taylor	Justice of the Vermont Supreme Court; 1926–1927	Succeeded by Harrie B. Chase
