= Harrie B. Chase =

American judge (1889–1969)

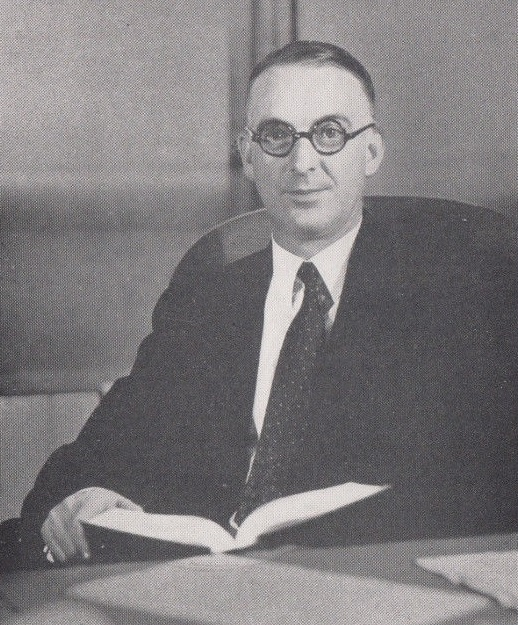

Senior Judge of the United States Court of Appeals for the Second Circuit
- In office September 1, 1954 – November 17, 1969

Chief Judge of the United States Court of Appeals for the Second Circuit
- In office 1953–1954
- Preceded by: Thomas Walter Swan
- Succeeded by: Charles Edward Clark

Judge of the United States Court of Appeals for the Second Circuit
- In office January 31, 1929 – September 1, 1954
- Appointed by: Calvin Coolidge
- Preceded by: Seat established by 45 Stat. 1081
- Succeeded by: Sterry R. Waterman

Associate Justice of the Vermont Supreme Court
- In office 1927–1929
- Appointed by: John E. Weeks
- Preceded by: Frank L. Fish
- Succeeded by: Julius A. Willcox

Personal details
- Born: Harrie Brigham Chase; August 9, 1889 Whitingham, Vermont, U.S.
- Died: November 17, 1969 (aged 80) Vernon, Vermont, U.S.
- Resting place: Morningside Cemetery; Brattleboro, Vermont
- Party: Republican
- Spouse: Mina A. Gilman (m. 1912)
- Children: 3
- Education: Dartmouth College (AB); Boston University (LLB)

Harrie Brigham Chase (August 9, 1889 – November 17, 1969) was an American lawyer and judge. He served briefly on the Supreme Court of Vermont, and then was a United States circuit judge of the United States Court of Appeals for the Second Circuit.

== Education and career ==
Chase was born in Whitingham, Vermont on August 9, 1889. He attended Whitingham public schools, Wilmington High School, and Phillips Exeter Academy. He attended Dartmouth College, receiving an Artium Baccalaureus degree in 1909, and the Boston University School of Law, receiving a Bachelor of Laws in 1912. Admitted to the Vermont bar in 1912, he formed a partnership with his father in October of that year and continued to practice law until 1919 From February 1, 1919 to June 1919, he served as state's attorney of Windham County, Vermont.

== State judicial service ==
Governor Percival W. Clement appointed him a superior court judge on May 16, 1919; at age 29, Chase was one of the youngest individuals in the state to become a judge. He served as a superior court judge until 1927, and was chief judge from 1926 to 1927. In 1927, he succeeded Frank L. Fish as an associate justice of the Supreme Court of Vermont, and served until 1929. He was succeeded on the Vermont Supreme Court by Julius A. Willcox.

== Federal judicial service ==
Chase was nominated by President Calvin Coolidge (a native Vermonter) on January 19, 1929, to the United States Court of Appeals for the Second Circuit, to a new seat authorized by 45 Stat. 1081. Chase's nomination disappointed Learned Hand and other advocates for the promotion of Thomas D. Thacher from the United States District Court for the Southern District of New York; Thacher went on to serve as Solicitor General of the United States. Chase was confirmed by the United States Senate on January 31, 1929, and received his commission the same day. He primarily worked out of his chambers in Brattleboro, Vermont, where he lived, and commuted to New York only when necessary, which meant that he never became part of the core of the court. He served as Chief Judge and as a member of the Judicial Conference of the United States from 1953 to 1954. He assumed senior status on September 1, 1954, and heard very few cases after the mid-1950s. He was succeeded by Sterry R. Waterman, also of Vermont. His service terminated on November 17, 1969, due to his death.

=== Judicial demeanor and philosophy ===
Gerald Gunther, a Learned Hand biographer, described Chase as a modest man who "never claimed to be an intellectual or a penetrating student of the law... preferring his outings on the golf course to his struggles with arguments and judicial opinions," and yet had "integrity and competence" and was not a "political judge preoccupied with cronyism" as colleague Martin Thomas Manton was. (Manton resigned in the midst of corruption allegations in 1939 and served time in prison for accepting bribes.) Chase was considered a conservative member of the Second Circuit bench and is remembered today primarily in connection with his colleagues, including Hand.

=== Notable law clerk ===
Among Chase's law clerks was James L. Oakes, who later himself became a Second Circuit judge.

== Death ==
Chase died in Vernon, Vermont on November 17, 1969, aged 80. He was buried at Morningside Cemetery in Brattleboro.

== Family ==
Chase, a Republican, was a Universalist in religion. He was the son of attorney Charles Sumner Chase and Carrie (Brigham) Chase, and his siblings included Paul A. Chase, who served as an associate justice of the Vermont Supreme Court. He married Mina A. Gilman of Brattleboro in 1912, and they had three children.

Legal offices
Preceded by Frank L. Fish	Associate Justice of the Vermont Supreme Court; 1927–1929	Succeeded by Julius A. Willcox
Preceded by Seat established by 45 Stat. 1081	Judge of the United States Court of Appeals for the Second Circuit; 1929–1954	Succeeded by Sterry R. Waterman
Preceded by Thomas Walter Swan	Chief Judge of the United States Court of Appeals for the Second Circuit; 1953–1954	Succeeded by Charles Edward Clark
