= Senator Haven =

Senator Haven may refer to:

- Erastus Otis Haven (1820–1881), Massachusetts State Senate
- John J. De Haven (1845–1913), California State Senate

== See also ==
- Palmer E. Havens (1818–1886), New York State Senate
