= Warner A. Graham =

American judge (1884–1934)

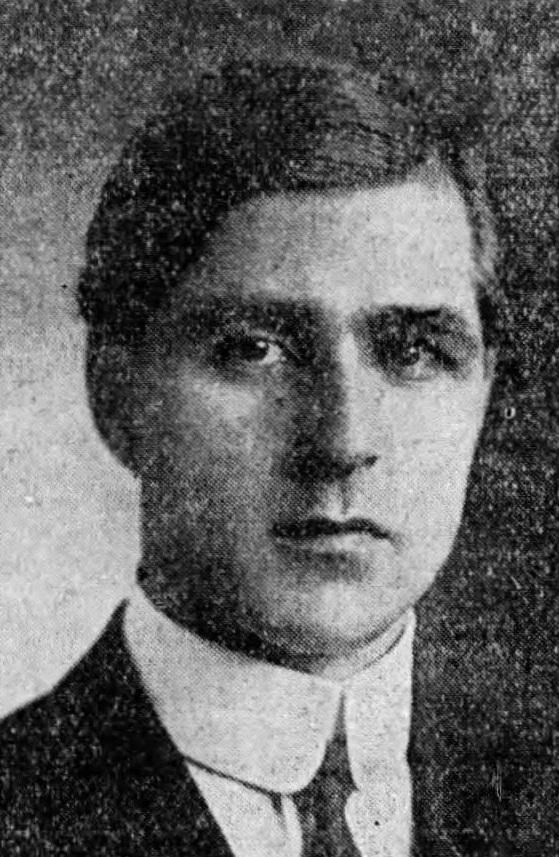
- Vermont Journal (Windsor, Vermont), September 14, 1923

Associate Justice of the Vermont Supreme Court
- In office 1931–1934
- Preceded by: Julius A. Willcox
- Succeeded by: John C. Sherburne

Chief Judge of the Vermont Superior Court
- In office 1929–1931
- Preceded by: Frank D. Thompson
- Succeeded by: John C. Sherburne

Judge of the Vermont Superior Court
- In office 1923–1931
- Preceded by: Stanley C. Wilson
- Succeeded by: Deane C. Davis

Judge of Probate for the Westminster District
- In office 1916–1923
- Preceded by: Zina H. Allbee
- Succeeded by: George H. Thompson

Member of the Vermont House of Representatives
- In office 1915–1917
- Preceded by: Herbert D. Ryder
- Succeeded by: Frederick L. Osgood
- Constituency: Westminster

Personal details
- Born: January 9, 1884 Greensboro, Vermont, U.S.
- Died: January 28, 1934 (aged 50) Bellows Falls, Vermont, U.S.
- Resting place: Oak Hill Cemetery, Bellows Falls, Vermont, U.S.
- Party: Republican
- Spouse: Blanche S. Woodfall (m. 1915)
- Children: 1
- Education: Albany Law School
- Profession: Attorney

Warner A. Graham (January 9, 1884 – January 28, 1934) was a Vermont attorney and judge. He was notable for his service as a judge of the Vermont Superior Court and an associate justice of the Vermont Supreme Court.

== Early life ==
Warner Aiken Graham was born in Greensboro, Vermont, on January 9, 1884, the son of William and Inez Lorinda (Fayer) Graham. He attended the schools of Greensboro, and graduated from Hardwick Academy in 1903. In 1907, Graham received his LL.B. degree from Albany Law School and attained admission to the bar.

== Start of career ==
Graham settled in Rockingham, where he began to practice law in partnership with Herbert D. Ryder. A Republican, Graham served in local offices, including auditor for the village of Bellows Falls, and grand juror (municipal court prosecutor) for the town of Rockingham. During the governorship of Allen M. Fletcher, Graham served as his Secretary of Civil and Military Affairs (chief assistant). In 1914, Graham was elected to the Vermont House of Representatives, and he served one term.

== Judicial career ==
From 1916 to 1923, Graham was probate judge for the district that included Rockingham. While serving on the probate court, his most notable matter was adjudicating the estate of Hetty Green.

In 1923, Graham was appointed a judge of the Vermont Superior Court. He advanced through seniority to become the court's chief judge in 1929, and he served until 1931. He was succeeded on the superior court by Deane C. Davis.

In 1931, Graham was appointed as an associate justice of the Vermont Supreme Court, filling the vacancy caused by the resignation of Julius A. Willcox, and he served until his death.

== Death and burial ==
Graham died at the Rockingham Hospital in Bellows Falls on January 28, 1934. He had been ill with appendicitis, and died as the result of post-surgical complications including gangrene and peritonitis. He was buried at Oak Hill Cemetery in Bellows Falls.

== Family ==
In 1915, Graham married Blanche S. Woodfall (1885–1969) of Bellows Falls. They were the parents of a son, Gordon (1921–1943). Gordon Graham died while serving in the United States Army during World War II, perishing as a result of the sinking of the SS Dorchester.

== Sources ==
=== Newspapers ===
- "Unanimously Nominated: Warner A. Graham of Bellows Falls for Republican Representative". Brattleboro Daily Reformer. Brattleboro, VT. October 5, 1914 – via Newspapers.com.
- "W. A. Graham Thanked: Chamber of Commerce Appreciates His legislative Work". Brattleboro Daily Reformer. Brattleboro, VT. April 17, 1915 – via Newspapers.com.
- "Warner A. Graham is Probate Judge". Brattleboro Daily Reformer. Brattleboro, VT. March 16, 1916 – via Newspapers.com.
- "Hetty Green's Wealth Goes to Two Children". Indianapolis News. Indianapolis, IN. July 6, 1916.
- "W. A. Graham is Named to the Supreme Bench". Burlington Free Press. Burlington, VT. October 7, 1931 – via Newspapers.com.
- "Deane C. Davis Named by Wilson Superior Judge". Burlington Free Press. Burlington, VT. October 9, 1931 – via Newspapers.com.
- "Warner A. Graham, Justice of the Supreme Court, Dies". Burlington Free Press. Burlington, VT. January 29, 1934 – via Newspapers.com.
- "Gordon Graham, 21, 'Lost in Action'". Burlington Free Press. Burlington, VT. February 19, 1943 – via Newspapers.com.

=== Books ===
- Cutler, William Richard (1914). New England Families, Genealogical and Memorial. Vol. 3. New York, NY: Lewis Historical Publishing Company.

=== Internet ===
- Parker, M. J. (Assistant Rockingham, VT Town Clerk) (March 1, 1934). "Vermont Death Records, 1909-2008, Entry for Warner Aiken Graham". Ancestry.com. Provo, UT: Ancestry.com, LLC.
- Foster, Eleanor B. (Rockingham, VT Town Clerk) (February 1, 1969). "Vermont Death Records, 1909-2008, Entry for Blanche Graham". Ancestry.com. Provo, UT: Ancestry.com, LLC.

Political offices
Preceded by Julius A. Willcox	Associate Justice of the Vermont Supreme Court; 1931–1934	Succeeded by John C. Sherburne
