= Samuel Hand =

American judge (1834–1886)

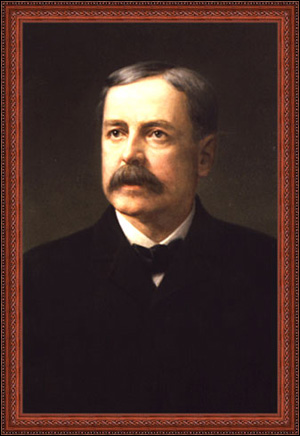
- Born: May 1, 1834; Elizabethtown, New York
- Died: May 21, 1886 (aged 52); Albany, New York
- Occupation: Judge
- Children: Learned Hand
- Father: Augustus C. Hand

Signature
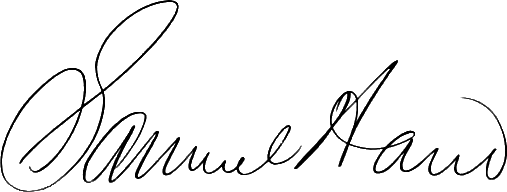

Samuel Hand (May 1, 1834 – May 21, 1886) was an Associate Judge of the New York Court of Appeals in 1878.

== Early life ==
Samuel Hand was born in Elizabethtown, New York on May 1, 1834, to Judge Augustus C. Hand and Marcia Seeyle Northrop. He went to Middlebury College in Vermont, and later transferred to Union College after two years. He graduated in 1851 as the youngest member of his class, and received an honorary law degree from Union College in 1884.

== Career ==
Hand's career in public service began in 1863, when he was appointed Corporation Counsel of Albany. He would then go on to serve as the official court reporter of the New York Court of Appeals from 1869 to 1872.

In 1878, Governor Lucius Robinson appointed Hand to the New York Court of Appeals to fill the vacancy caused by the death of Associate Justice William Allen; Hand served on the court during the later half of 1878 before retiring to continue his private law practice.

== Death ==
On May 21, 1886, Hand died at his home in Albany of tongue cancer; he was survived by his son, Learned Hand, himself a noted judge.
