= Thomas A. Tomlinson =

American politician

Thomas Ash Tomlinson

Member of the U.S. House of Representatives from New York's 13th district
- In office March 4, 1841 – March 3, 1843
- Preceded by: Augustus C. Hand
- Succeeded by: Daniel D. Barnard

Member of the New York State Assembly
- In office 1835–1836

Personal details
- Born: March 1802 New York City, U.S.
- Died: June 18, 1872 (aged 70) Keeseville, New York, U.S.
- Party: Whig

Thomas Ash Tomlinson (March 1802 – June 18, 1872) was a U.S. representative from New York.

Born in New York City in March 1802, Tomlinson attended the schools of Champlain and Plattsburgh, New York. He studied law and gained admission to the bar, commencing practice in Keeseville, New York, in 1823. He was a mill owner and dealer in lands, serving as a colonel in the state militia and as a member of the New York State Assembly in 1835 and 1836.

Tomlinson was elected as a Whig to the Twenty-seventh Congress (March 4, 1841 – March 3, 1843). He thereafter resumed the practice of law and also engaged in the real estate business. He died in Keeseville, New York, June 18, 1872, and was interred in Evergreen Cemetery.

== Sources ==
- United States Congress. "Thomas A. Tomlinson (id: T000301)". Biographical Directory of the United States Congress.

U.S. House of Representatives
Preceded by Augustus C. Hand	Member of the U.S. House of Representatives from New York's 13th congressional district 1841–1843	Succeeded by Daniel D. Barnard
