= Western Union =

American financial services company

The Western Union Company
- Type: Public
- Traded as: NYSE: WU; S&P 600 component
- Industry: Financial services
- Founded: April 8, 1851; 175 years ago in Rochester, New York, U.S.
- Headquarters: Denver, Colorado, U.S.
- Area served: Worldwide
- Key people: Jeffrey A. Joerres (chairman); Devin McGranahan (president and CEO)
- Services: Wire transfers Money orders Money transfers Bill pay Transfer tracking Price estimation
- Revenue: ▼US$4.05 billion (2025)
- Net income: ▼US$500 million (2025)
- Total assets: ▼US$8.31 billion (2025)
- Total equity: ▼US$958 million (2025)
- Number of employees: 9,100 (December 31, 2024)
- Website: westernunion.com

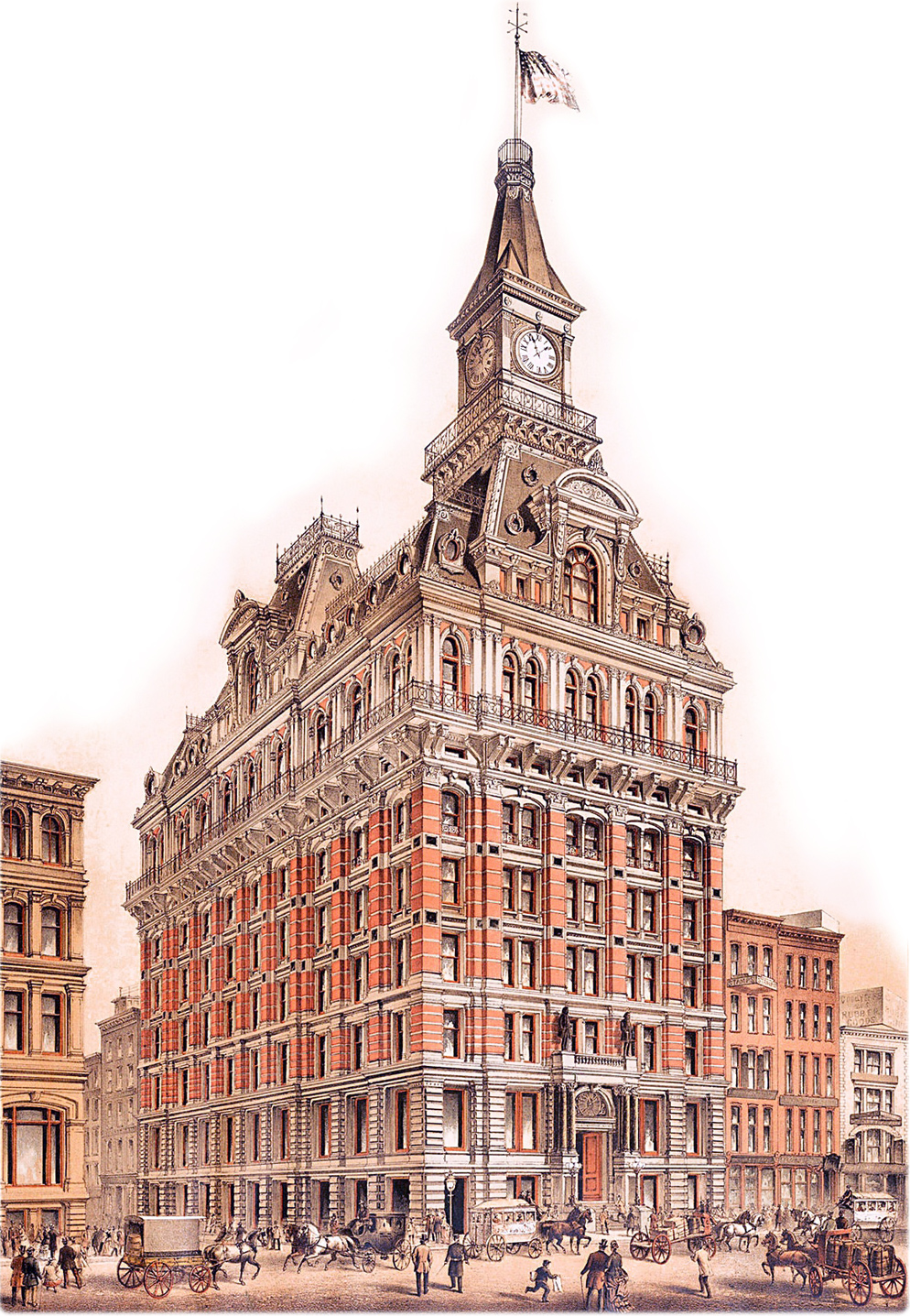
Western Union Telegraph Building, lithograph

The Western Union Company is an American multinational financial services corporation headquartered in Denver, Colorado.

Founded in 1851 as the New York and Mississippi Valley Printing Telegraph Company in Rochester, New York, the company changed its name to the Western Union Telegraph Company in 1856 after merging with several other telegraph companies. It dominated the American telegraphy industry from the 1860s to the 1980s, pioneering technology such as telex and developing a range of telegraph-related services, including wire money transfer, in addition to its core business of transmitting and delivering telegram messages.

After experiencing financial difficulties, it began to move its business away from communications in the 1980s and increasingly focused on its money-transfer services. It ceased its communications operations completely in 2006, at which time The New York Times described it as "the world's largest money-transfer business" and predicted the company would remain as such due to the large number of immigrants using the company to send remittance payments to their home country. However, since circa 2020 Western Union has lost substantial numbers of customers in remittances due to advances in smartphone technology.

From the perspective of the history of technology, Western Union notably completed the first transcontinental telegraph in 1861, being a part of U.S. industry's investments into developing American communications between the coasts of the Atlantic Ocean and the Pacific Ocean. The first messages were sent to then President of the United States, Abraham Lincoln, in 1861.

== History ==
=== Founding and expansion (1851–1866) ===
The New York and Mississippi Valley Printing Telegraph Company was founded in Rochester, New York, by Samuel L. Selden, Hiram Sibley, and others in 1851. In 1856 the company merged with its competitor the Erie and Michigan Telegraph Company, controlled by John James Speed, Francis Ormand Jonathan Smith and Ezra Cornell and, at Cornell's insistence, changed its name to Western Union Telegraph Company.

In 1857, Western Union participated in the 'Treaty of Six Nations', an attempt by six of the largest telegraph firms to create a system of regional telegraphy monopolies with a shared network of main lines. After the creation of the 'Six Nations' system, Western Union continued to acquire both larger and smaller telegraph companies and by 1864 had transformed from a regional monopoly into a national oligopolist with its only serious competitors being the American Telegraph Company and the United States Telegraph Company.

Western Union completed the first transcontinental telegraph in 1861. The first messages went to then-President of the U.S. Abraham Lincoln. The firm additionally formed the Russian–American Telegraph Company in an attempt to link America to Europe, via Alaska, into Siberia, to Moscow – a project abandoned in 1867 following the successful laying of a transatlantic cable in 1866.

=== Dominance and new challengers (1866–1881) ===
In 1866, Western Union acquired the American Telegraph Company and the United States Telegraph Company, its two main competitors, for a time gaining a virtual monopoly over the American telegraphy industry. The company also began to develop new telegraphy-related services beyond the transmission and delivery of telegrams, launching the first stock ticker in 1866, a standardized time service in 1870 and wire money transfer in 1871.

In the 1870s, the company faced increased competition from newly formed rival telegraphy conglomerate Atlantic and Pacific Telegraph Company and from the nascent telephony industry led by the Bell Telephone Company. Western Union instead attempted to launch a rival telephony system before settling a patent lawsuit with Bell and leaving the telephone business completely in 1879.

Financier Jay Gould orchestrated a merger of the Atlantic and Pacific Telegraph Company with Western Union in 1881, giving him a controlling share of the merged company.

=== Monopoly and decline of telegraphy (1881–1963) ===
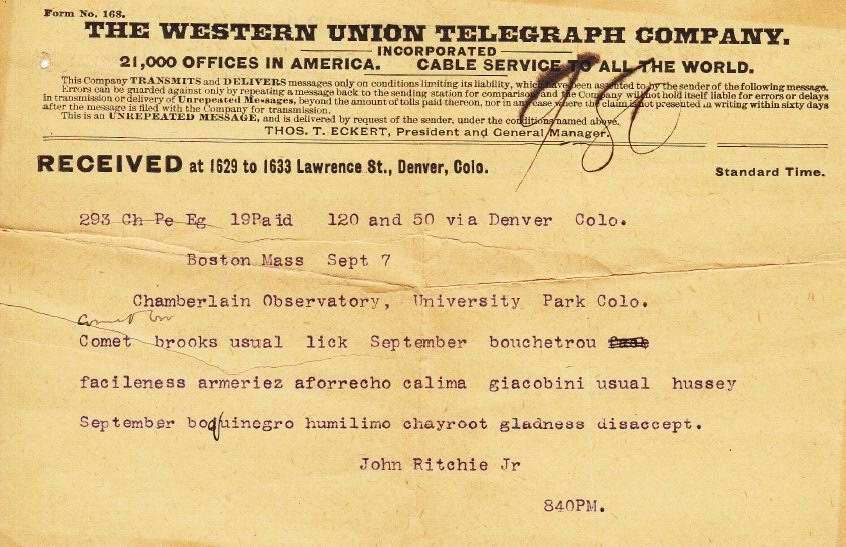
A Western Union telegram sent on September 7, 1896, to report on the positions of two comets

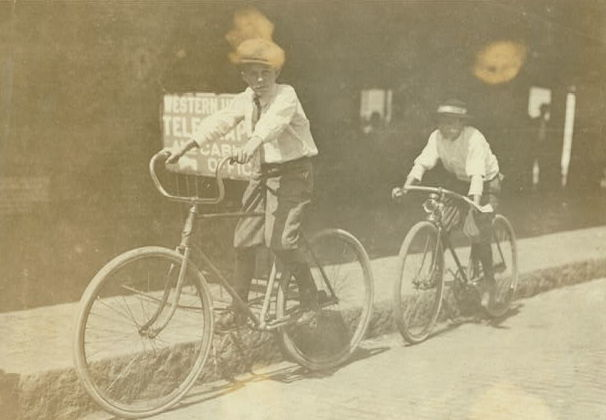
A 12-year-old Western Union messenger boy in Tampa, Florida, 1911

When the Dow Jones Railroad Average stock market index for the New York Stock Exchange (NYSE) was created in 1884, Western Union was one of the original eleven companies to be included. Economist Richard T. Ely wrote in 1889 that Western Union was clearly acting as a monopoly in the telegraph industry. By 1900, Western Union operated a million miles of telegraph lines and two international undersea cables.

AT&T gained control of Western Union in 1909, acquiring a 30% stake in the company. However, in 1913 AT&T, under indictment for violating the Sherman Antitrust Act of 1890, was forced to sell its shares in the company which once again became independent.

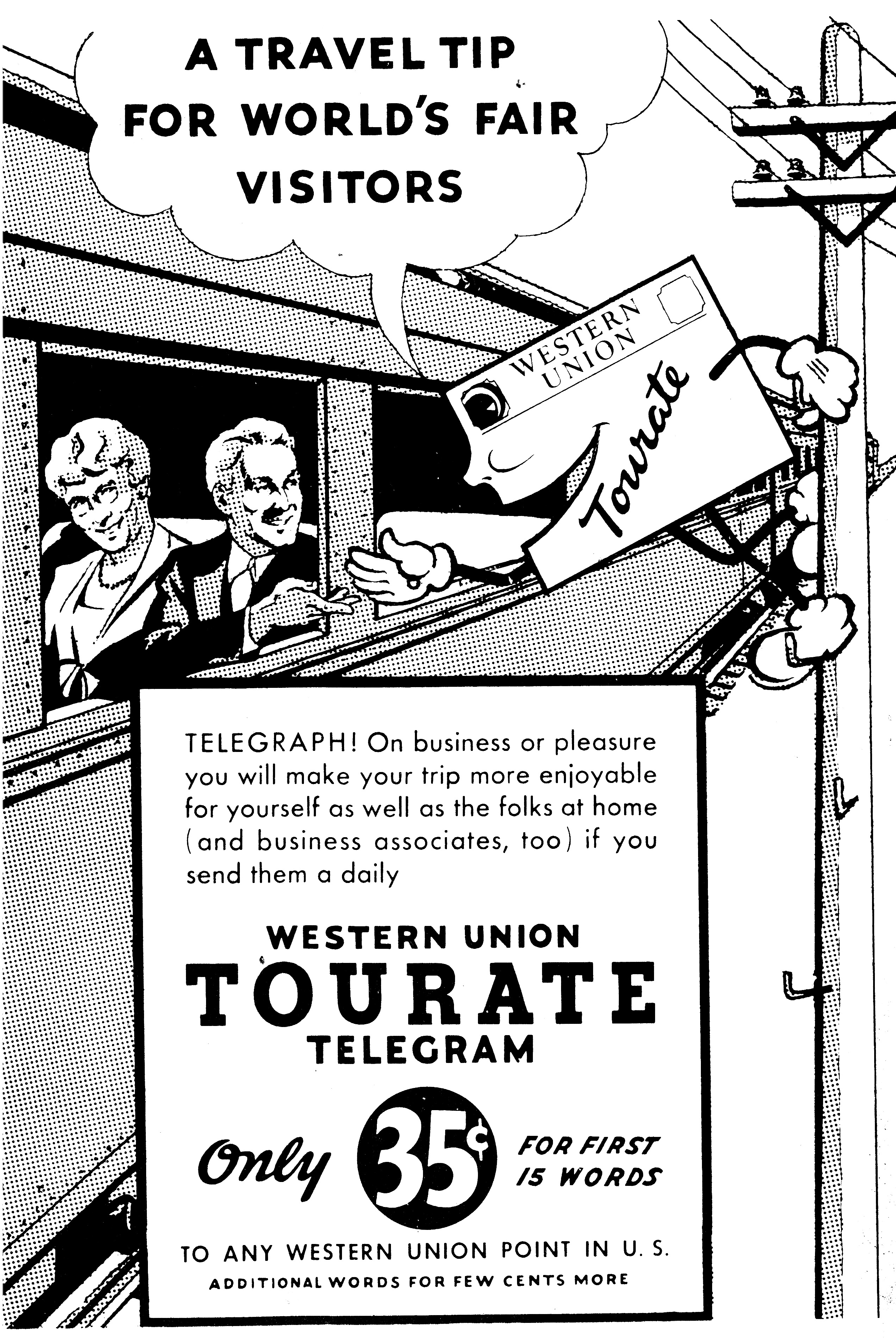
Advertisement for Western Union "Tourate" telegram service, 1939

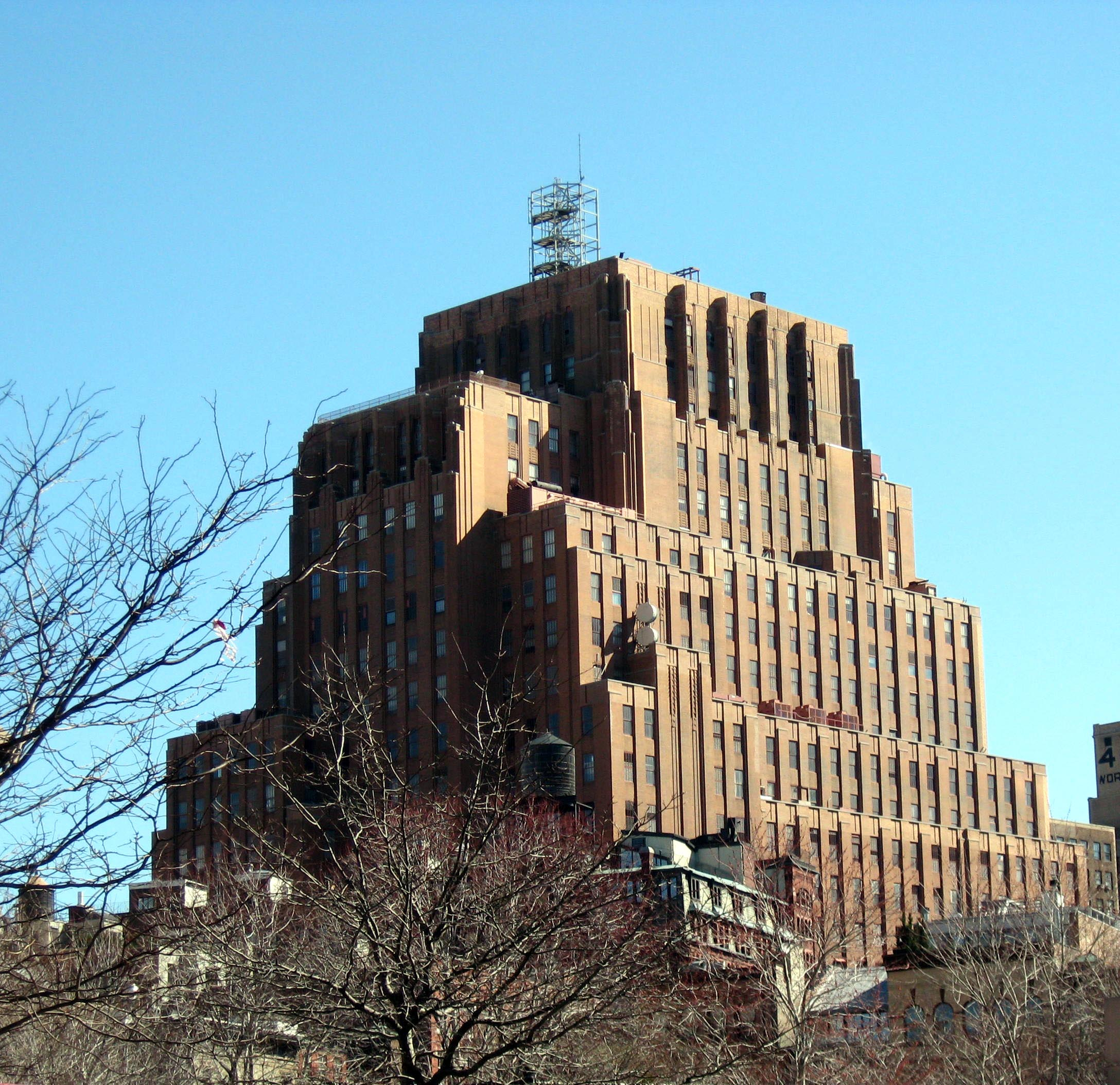
60 Hudson Street, Manhattan, was WU's headquarters in the early and middle 20th century.

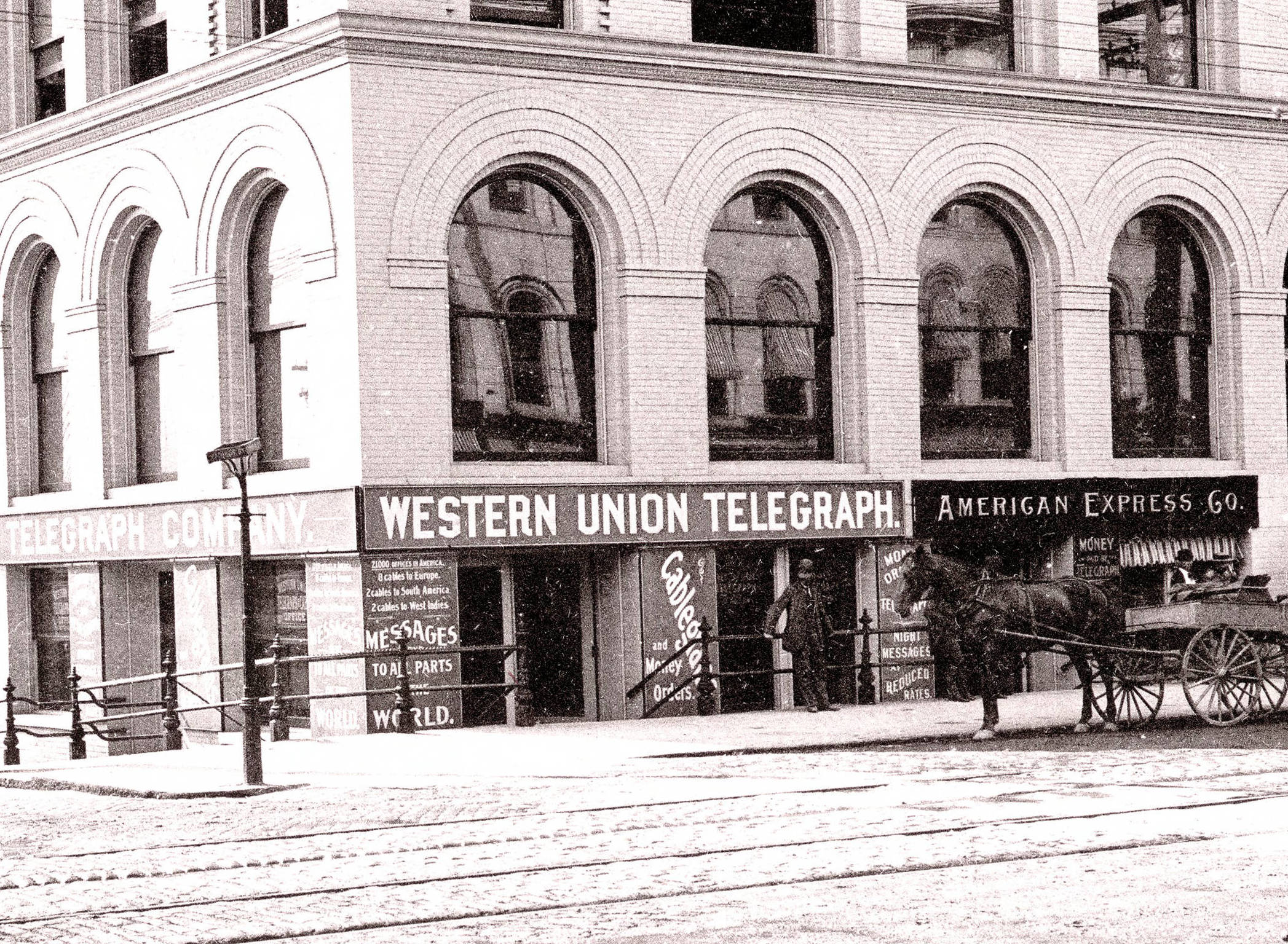
Western Union Telegraph storefront seen in the Chamber of Commerce Building in Toledo, Ohio, 1895

Western Union acquired its only major competitor in the American telegraphy sector Postal Telegraph, Inc. in 1945, effectively giving the company monopoly power over the industry. After 1945 the telegraphy industry began to experience a decline as the use of telephones increased, especially in the case of long-distance calls, with total telegraph messages almost halving from 1945 to 1960.

In 1958, Western Union began offering telex services to customers in New York City. Teleprinter equipment for the telex network was originally provided by Siemens & Halske AG and later by Teletype Corporation. Direct international telex services commenced in the summer of 1960, with limited service to London and Paris.

In honor of Valentine's Day 1959, Western Union introduced the Candygram, a box of chocolates accompanying a telegram that was featured in a commercial with the famously rotund radio announcer Don Wilson.

=== Western Union International spin-off ===
In 1963, Western Union organized its international cable system properties and its right-of-way for connecting international telegraph lines into a separate company called Western Union International (WUI), which it sold that year to American Securities.

In 1967, American Securities listed WUI as a publicly traded company on the New York Stock Exchange. WUI was acquired by Xerox for $207 million in stock in 1979 and subsequently sold for $185 million in cash to MCI Communications in 1981. MCI renamed WUI to MCI International, ceasing the use of Western Union branding.

=== Consolidation (1963–1984) ===
Logo, 1969 to 1990

Western Union purchased the TWX system from AT&T in January 1969, the only major competitor to its own telex network.

Western Union became the first American telecommunications corporation to maintain its own fleet of geosynchronous communications satellites, starting in 1974. The fleet of satellites, called Westar, carried communications within the Western Union company for telegram and mailgram message data to Western Union bureaus nationwide. It also handled traffic for its telex and TWX services. The Westar satellites' transponders were also leased by other companies for relaying video, voice, data, and facsimile (fax) transmissions. The Westar fleet of satellites and ground stations were sold to Hughes (who originally built all of the Westar satellites launched) in 1988 after Western Union suffered financial losses with their telecommunications assets starting in the early 1980s.

In 1981, Western Union purchased a 50% interest in Airfone. It sold Airfone to GTE in 1986 for $39 million in cash. From 1982, as a result of financial services deregulation, Western Union began offering wire money transfer services globally.

=== Financial difficulties, bankruptcies and restructuring (1984–2006) ===
In 1984, after years of declining profits and mounting debts, Western Union began to negotiate with its creditors regarding debt restructuring. The restructuring was completed in 1987 when investor Bennett S. LeBow acquired control of Western Union through an outside of chapter 11 process that was a complex leveraged recapitalization. The transaction was backed by a total of $900 million in high-yield bonds and preferred stock underwritten by Michael Milken's group at Drexel Burnham Lambert as part of an exchange offer. LeBow installed Robert J. Amman as president and CEO who led a complete strategic, operational and balance sheet restructuring of the company over the next six years.

Amman executed a strategy of redirecting Western Union from being an asset-based provider of communications services, with a money transfer business as a large but less important part of the business, into being a provider of consumer-based money transfer financial services. Thus, Amman ran the company as two separate companies. One business consisted of the money transfer business, which was funded and operated to take advantage of the significant growth opportunity. The second unit consisted of all the non-strategic communications assets such as the long-distance analog voice network, satellite business and undersea cable assets.

Between 1987 and 1990, Robert A. Schriesheim, who was also installed by LeBow, served as a special advisor to Amman. Schriesheim oversaw the sale of the four non-strategic telecommunications assets for about $280 million.

Most of the company's business services unit including the Easylink electronic mail and Telex businesses were sold to AT&T for $180 million in Dec 1990. Western Union Priority Services including Mailgram, Priority Letter and Custom Letter services were not included in the deal. This marked the end of Western Union's telecommunications carrier business.

The official name of the corporation was changed to New Valley Corporation in 1991, as part of the company's move to seek bankruptcy protection to eliminate the firm's overleveraged balance sheet while continuing to grow the money transfer business. The name change was used to shield the Western Union name from being dragged through the proceedings (and the resulting bad PR). Under the day to day leadership of Amman and the backing of LeBow, the company's value increased dramatically through its years operating under chapter 11.

Following various restructurings, including negotiations with Carl Icahn who became a large bond holder, New Valley Corporation was sold in a bankruptcy auction to First Financial Management Corporation in 1994 for $1.2 billion. In 1995, First Financial merged with First Data Corporation in a $6 billion transaction.

=== Public listing and international expansion (2006–present) ===
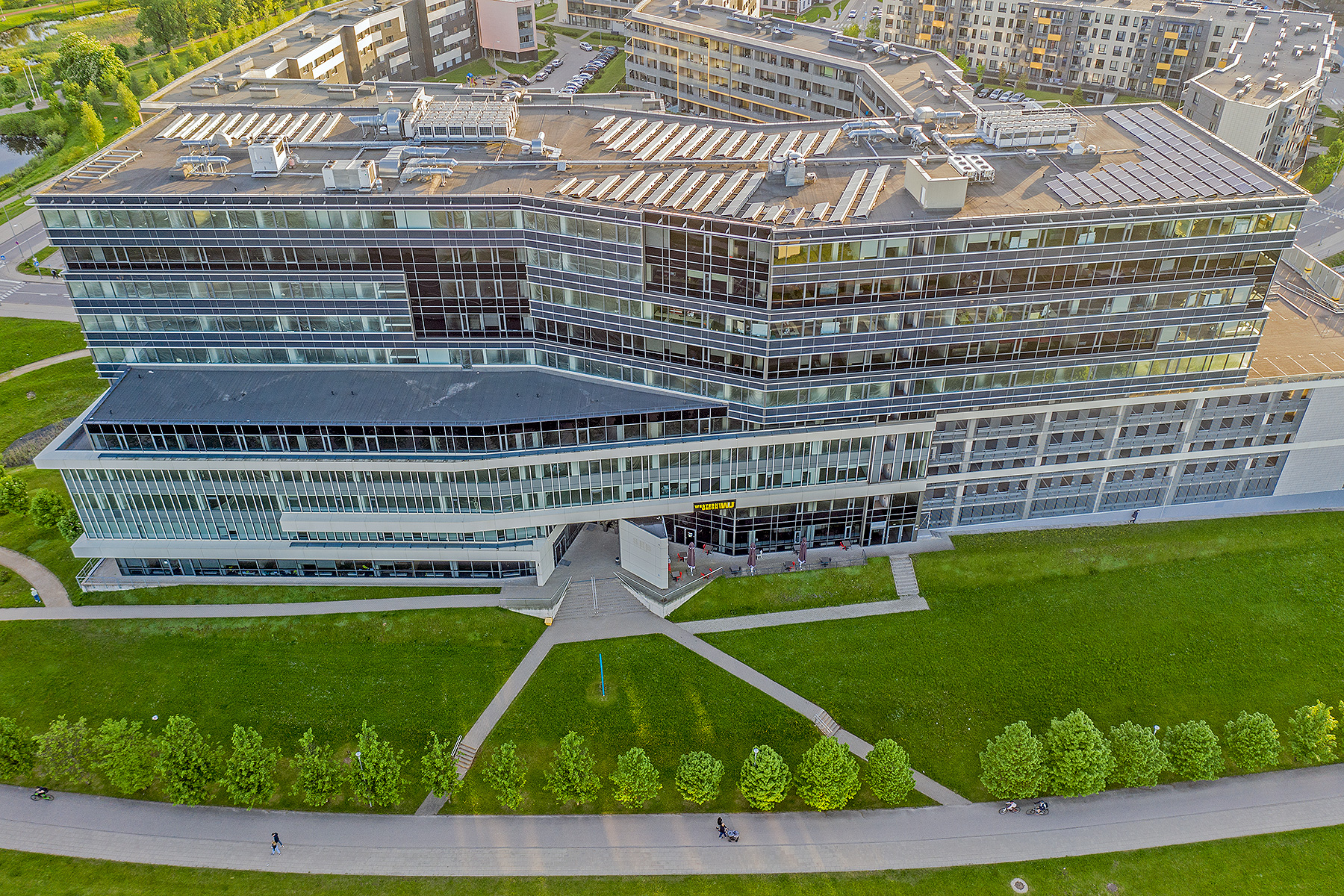
Western Union European Regional Operations Office in Vilnius

On January 26, 2006, First Data announced its intention to spin off Western Union into independent publicly traded financial services company focused on money transfers through a tax-free spin-off to First Data shareholders. The spin off occurred as planned on September 29, 2006. The next day Western Union announced that it would cease offering telegram transmission and delivery. International Telegram Company took over telegram service.

In May 2009, Western Union announced its plan to acquire Canada-based Custom House from Peter Gustavson. The deal closed in September 2009 for a purchase price of US$371 million. This acquisition led the company to be re-branded as Western Union Business Solutions.

In January 2011, Western Union acquired Angelo Costa, a group active in money transfer and services to immigrants. Angelo Costa has a network of 7,500 points of sale throughout Europe. The agreement was signed for US$200 million.

In July 2011, Western Union acquired Travelex's Global Business Payments division for £606 million.

In October 2011, Western Union completed the acquisition of Finint S.r.l., one of Western Union's leading money transfer network agents in Europe, with more than 10,000 subagent locations across Italy, Spain, and the United Kingdom.

In May 2015, rumors emerged over a proposed merger of Western Union and competitor MoneyGram, at a time when both companies' revenue were declining. Western Union denied this was the case. In January 2017, Ant Financial, Alibaba's financial technology firm instead unsuccessfully attempted to acquire MoneyGram for $880 million, but this was blocked by the U.S. government citing national security concerns.

In 2018, the company moved its headquarters from Englewood, Colorado to the Denver Tech Center. The Englewood office complex was sold in 2020 for $40 million.

In November 2020, Western Union acquired a 15% stake in the digital payments unit of Saudi Telecom Company for $200 million.

In 2022, Western Union suspended operations in Russia and Belarus due to the Russian invasion of Ukraine.

In 2025, Western Union announced its plan to acquire Latin American payment transfer company Intermex for $500 million.

== Current services ==
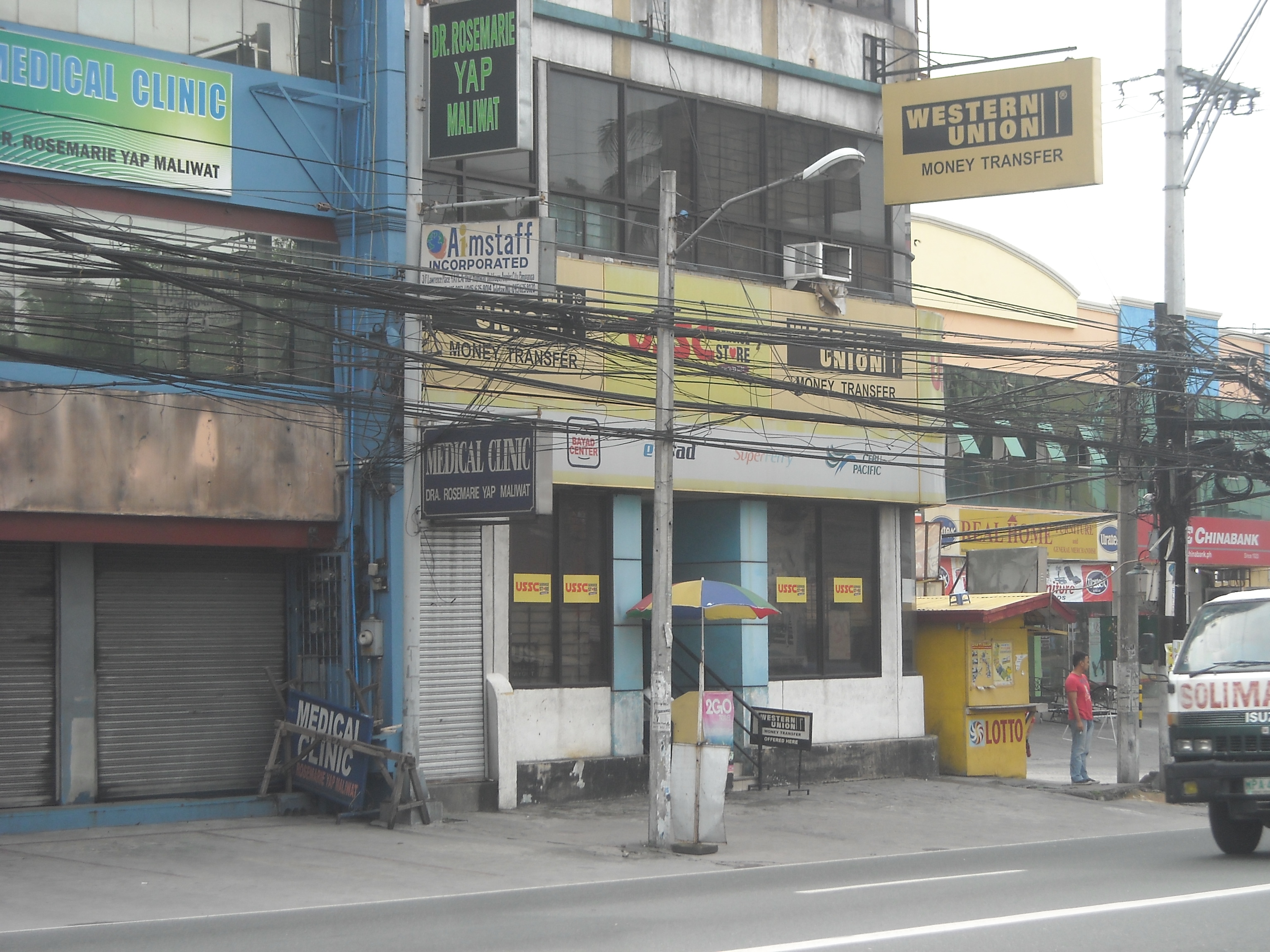
A Western Union outlet in Angeles City, Philippines

=== Wire transfer ===
Money can be sent online or in-person at Western Union agent locations. Cash can be collected in person at any other Western Union agent location worldwide by providing the 10-digit MTCN (Money Transfer Control Number) and identification. In some cases, a secret question and answer can be used instead of identification.

=== Western Union Mobile ===
In October 2007, Western Union announced plans to introduce a mobile money-transfer service in collaboration with the GSM Association, a global trade association representing more than 700 mobile operators across 218 countries and covering 2.5 billion mobile subscribers.

The proliferation of mobile phones in both developed and developing economies provides a widely accessible consumer device capable of delivering mobile financial services. These services range from text notifications related to Western Union cash delivery to phone-based remittance options. Western Union's mobile money transfer service will connect its core money-transfer platform to m-bank or m-wallet platforms offered by mobile operators and/or locally regulated financial institutions.

=== Western Union Connect ===
The company launched the Western Union Connect service in October 2015, following partnership agreements with major instant messaging apps WeChat and Viber. The partnership allows users of WeChat to send up to $100 to China, the US and 200 other countries, while Viber users can send up to $100 for $3.99 plus exchange rate fees, with that fixed fee increasing the more money is sent up a limit of $499.

== Past services ==
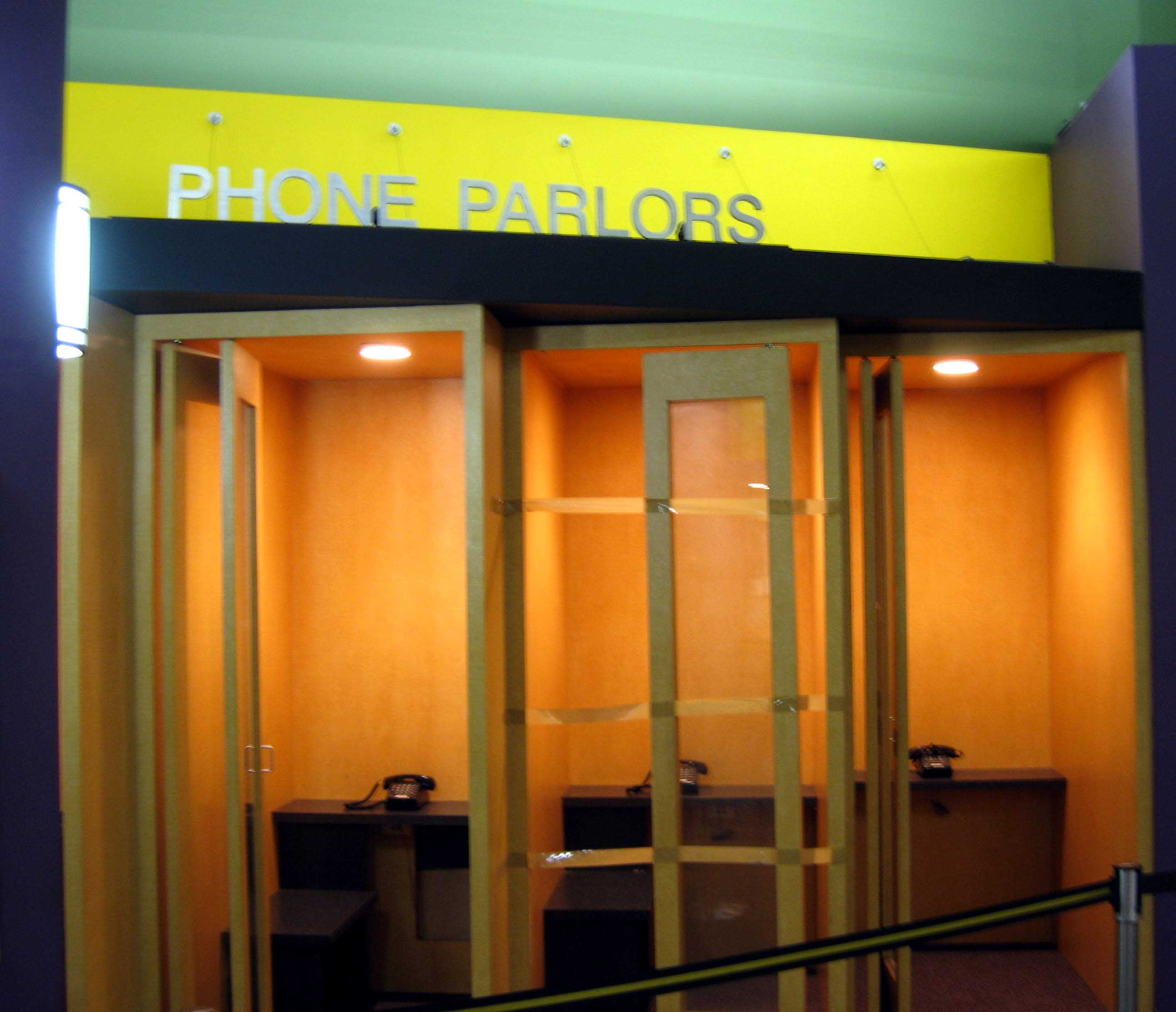
WU phone parlors near Times Square, 2008

=== Communications ===
Along with satellite telecommunications, Western Union was also active in other forms of telecommunication services:

- Common carrier terrestrial microwave networks
- Business communications networks such as Telex and TWX, which was acquired from AT&T Corporation and renamed Telex II by Western Union
- Landline-based leased voice and data communication circuits
- Long-distance telephone service
- Airfone air-ground radiotelephone service from 1981 to 1986
- Cellular phone service for a short time in the early 1980s (the phones were made by two-way radio manufacturer E. F. Johnson Company)

Most of these services were discontinued by Western Union in the late 1980s due to a lack of profitability, with the company's divisions providing said services being divested and sold to other companies, such as the 1988 sale of WU's satellite fleet and services to Hughes Space and Communications, and the sale of WU's Airfone service to GTE in 1986.

=== Charge card ===
In 1914, Western Union was the first to issue a charge card.

=== BidPay ===
As the Internet became an arena for commerce at the turn of the millennium, Western Union started its online services. BidPay was renamed "Western Union Auction Payments" in 2004 before being renamed back to BidPay. BidPay ceased operations on December 31, 2005, and was purchased for US$1.8 million in March 2006 by CyberSource Corp. who announced their intention to re-launch BidPay. BidPay was later discontinued by CyberSource effective December 31, 2007.

== Sponsorship ==
Western Union was a major shirt-sponsor of the Sydney Roosters NRL team from 2002 to 2003. The company still sponsors the team, but not as a shirt-sponsor. Globally Western Union sponsors numerous community events that help support the diaspora communities that use the global Money Transfer service. They also sponsored numerous WWE and WCW pay-per-view events such as No Way Out 1998 and Slamboree 2000. They sponsored UEFA Europa League from 2012 until 2015.

During the 2003–04 season, Western Union served as the title sponsor for the Premier Division Football League in Dhaka, Bangladesh.

The First Data Western Union Foundation donates money to charitable causes globally. After the 2004 Indian Ocean tsunami, the Foundation donated US$1,000,000 to the relief effort.

The Denver Nuggets of the National Basketball Association announced a three-year deal making Western Union the team's jersey sponsor, beginning with the 2017–18 NBA Season.

Liverpool F.C. announced on August 9, 2017, that Western Union would become their first ever sleeve sponsors, from the start of the 2017–18 season. They signed a £25m deal for 5 years as Liverpool's sleeve sponsor.

== Involvement in early computer networking ==
Western Union telegrams were transmitted through a store and forward message switching system. Early versions were manual telegraph systems. Later systems using teleprinters were semi-automatic, using punched paper tape to receive, store, and retransmit messages. Plan 55-A, Western Union's last paper tape based switching system (1948–1976), was fully automatic, with automatic routing.

Western Union was a prime contractor in the Automatic Digital Network (AUTODIN) program. AUTODIN, a military application for communication, was first developed in the 1960s, but was dismantled in favor of the ARPANET, the precursor to the modern Internet in the 1990s. The Defense Message System (DMS) replaced AUTODIN in 2000.

AUTODIN, originally named "ComLogNet", was a reliable service that operated at 99.99% availability, using mechanical punched card readers and tab machines to send and receive data over leased lines. During the peak operation of AUTODIN, the US portion of the network handled 20 million messages a month. Western Union failed in its attempts to engineer a replacement (AUTODIN II), leading to the development of an acceptable packet-switched network by BBN (the developer of the ARPANET) which became the foundation of today's Internet. AUTODIN service ceased in 2000, years after it had become obsolete.

A related innovation that came from AUTODIN was Western Union's computer based EasyLink service. This system allowed one of the first marketable email systems for non-government users. The system allowed the same message to be sent simultaneously to multiple recipients via email, fax, mailgram, or telex services as well as allowing messages to be sent from the integrated formats. With the service, users could also perform research utilizing its InfoLink application. EasyLink was sold to AT&T in 1989-90. AT&T rebranded the service PersonaLink but failed to make the service profitable. EasyLink Services Corporation was spun off as a separate company in 2001, and was purchased by OpenText in 2012.

== Controversies ==
=== Scam industry and money laundering ===
Western Union advises its customers not to send money to someone that they have never met in person. Despite its efforts in increasing customers' awareness of the issue, Western Union is used extensively for internet fraud by scammers.

Western Union has been required to maintain records of payout locations of the individuals who may be laundering the money, though this information may be obtained only through the use of a subpoena. Hence advance-fee fraud and romance scammers continue to receive funds via Western Union confident in the knowledge that money lost to overseas scammers is almost always unrecoverable. For this reason, it is banned as a medium of payment through eBay, and discouraged on other online auction websites.

Western Union admitted to allowing wire fraud in January 2017 and agreed to pay $586 million, for turning a blind eye as criminals used its service for advance fee fraud. Scammers engaging in various 419 advance fee scams including offering fake job offers and lottery prizes, were able to process transactions using Western Union money transfer, mainly by giving the agents a share of the earnings from their scams. Western Union failed to investigate hundreds of thousands of complaints that were filed by victims.

=== Money laundering and terrorist financing ===
The Central Bank of Ireland reprimanded and fined Western Union €1.75 million in May 2015 because of failures in anti money laundering practices which could have left the firm's payment services open to being used for money laundering and/or terrorist financing saying that they were concerned that Western Union "failed to have in place sufficiently robust systems and procedures to train agents, to monitor and identify suspicious activity in respect of smaller transactions, and to maintain appropriate records" and "the splitting of payments into many separate smaller payments is a common method used to launder money. Similarly, terrorist financing is often carried out by small payment transfers."

Western Union agents in the US also allowed Chinese immigrants to pay hundreds of millions of dollars to human smugglers through the service, evading the transfer reporting requirements by sending the amounts in smaller increments.

In 2017, Western Union admitted to money laundering and consumer fraud violations and agreed to pay $586 million in a settlement with the Department of Justice. Among other charges, the Justice Department showed that Western Union was complicit in creating an ecosystem where criminals were able to engage in consumer fraud and human trafficking. The charges were dismissed in March 2020.

In 2018, Western Union was fined $60 million by the New York State Department of Financial Services. The press release accompanying the fine stated that, "Western Union executives put profits ahead of the company's responsibilities to detect and prevent money laundering and fraud, by choosing to maintain relationships with and failing to discipline obviously suspect, but highly profitable, agents."

On May 29, 2019, Western Union announced the departure of a company executive, Odilon Almeida, who had served as executive vice president and president of Global Money Transfer. In 2012, Stewart Stockdale, who had the same position as Almeida, left the company under similar circumstances.

=== Connection to military intelligence ===
The book The One Percent Doctrine: Deep Inside America's Pursuit of Its Enemies Since 9/11 alleged that Western Union provided United States military intelligence with personal information.

=== Anti-competitive behavior ===
Western Union has been accused of engaging in anti-competitive behavior in Africa as a result of a lack of competition on the continent. According to a report by the Overseas Development Institute, this allows Western Union to artificially inflate its fees for money transfers, charging what has been called an "Africa charge" of 8% consistently "applied across countries regardless of the size of the market, regulatory costs or market risk." However, the fees can be as high as 10% or more, depending on the region. Africa's remittance market remains the most expensive in the world, and the region is estimated to incur excess costs of $1.4 billion to $2.3 billion per year as a result of these high remittance fees.

The company has also been criticized for its use of exclusivity agreements with banks in countries that receive remittances, restricting competition and harming the consumer, by requiring the consumer to conduct transactions via nominated banks. This also allows for the imposition of above-average transaction fees.

In February 2016, Harada Ltd filed a complaint with the EU antitrust regulator claiming that Western Union colluded with banks to push out smaller rivals from the money transfer market. The commission concluded that the allegations were insufficient and found in favor of Western Union.

== See also ==
- 60 Hudson Street – Former headquarters
- 92 Code
- Communications in the United States
- Pangram – Used by WU to test teleprinters.
- Pennsylvania v. New York — Question before the U.S. Supreme Court: when Western Union Money orders are supposed to escheat to the state if not fully redeemed, what state is to get the money?
- Telegram messenger
- Telegraph in United States history
- Western Union, 1939 schooner chartered by Western Union Telegraph Company, used in the film Amistad as a portrayal of the slave ship La Amistad
- Western Union splice
- Western Union Telegraph Building – Former headquarters
