= Chatfield (surname) =

Chatfield is a toponymic surname of English origin with Old English roots, first appearing in the region of Sussex. Records indicate that the first people to bear this name were from a location named Catsfield, in Southern England.

== Etymology ==
The surname Chatfield can be traced to the village of Catsfield in East Sussex. The first recorded instance of this name is William de Cattefeld, found within tax records from the area in the early 1300s. Since the surname was most likely granted as a byname, the origin of the name Chatfield is directly tied to the etymology of the village itself. Several theories currently exist as to how the village of Catsfield was named.

The earliest record of Catsfield comes from the Domesday Book, in which the village is referred to as Cedesfelle. It's believed that Catsfield is combination of two Old English words, the first being Catte and the second being Feld, which translates to, "field, pasture, plains, or open country". More specifically, the word refers to an uncultivated land without forests.. There has been some speculation as to the true meaning behind the word Catte.

Firstly, the suspected origin of Catte is that it was derived from a personal name of Anglo-Saxon origin. The namesake of Catsfield, however, is also subject to debate. The leading theory is that the village church, now called The Church of Saint Laurence, was initially constructed in the name of, or later dedicated to, Saint Cedd or his brother, Chad of Mercia. The name may also be derived from an obscure saint, Ceatta of Lichfield, though this may simply be another name for Chad of Mercia, as there are few records containing the former name and Saint Chad was also a Bishop of Lichfield.

Secondly, the origin of Catte could be traced back to an ancient Germanic tribe named the Chatti or Catti that is known to have settled in Sussex. Their settlement may have been named Cattefeld, which could have literally meant, plains of the Catti. Since the word catte is an old English feminine word for cat, it could be that the name may have changed to Chatfield following the Norman Conquest. From old English, the words Catte + Feld may have transformed over time into their Frankish equivalent, Chat + Field.

== Coat of Arms ==
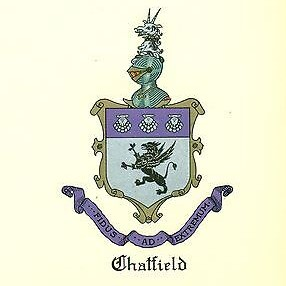
Chatfield Family Coat of Arms

A coat of arms was granted to the Chatfield family in 1564 and recorded at the College of Arms in London, England.

The crest is a heraldic antelope's head of erased argent, ducally gorged - meaning with a ducal crown around its neck. The antelope symbolizes unwavering fidelity while argent is emblematic of purity.

The escutcheon is composed of an argent charge displaying a sable griffin and a purple chief displaying three argent scallop shells. The griffin symbolizes both temporal and spiritual authority, as in the case of early church barons, while sable is indicative of antiquity. The scallop shells indicate that ancestors of the family made a trip to the Holy Land.

=== Motto ===
The Chatfield family motto is set on purple beneath the coat of arms. It reads, in Latin, “fidus ad extremum”, which translates to "faithful to the end".

== Notable people ==
Notable people with the surname include:

- Abbie Chatfield (born 1995), Australian radio presenter and television personality
- Adam Chatfield (born 1979), Australian rules footballer
- Andrew Chatfield (gridiron football) (born 1998), American football player
- Andrew G. Chatfield (1810–1875), New York and Minnesota politician and lawyer
- Bianca Chatfield (born 1982), Australian netball player
- Constant Chatfield (1849–1921), American sea captain and politician
- Edward Chatfield (1802–1839), English portrait painter
- Emelia Chatfield (born 2001), Haitian-American hurdler and sprinter
- Eric Chatfield (1900–1985), Australian rules footballer
- Ernle Chatfield, 1st Baron Chatfield (1873–1967), Royal Navy admiral
- Ewen Chatfield (born 1950), New Zealand cricketer
- Florence Chatfield (1867–1949), Australian nurse
- Frederick Chatfield (1801–1872), British consul in Central America
- Jack Chatfield, New Mexico politician
- Jalen Chatfield (born 1996), American ice hockey player
- Jason Chatfield (born 1984), Australian editorial and comic strip cartoonist and stand-up comedian
- John Lyman Chatfield (1826–1863), Union Army colonel in the American Civil War
- Lee Chatfield (born 1988), Michigan former politician
- Levi S. Chatfield (1808–1884), New York politician and lawyer
- Mark Chatfield (1953–1998), American breaststroke swimmer
- Michael Chatfield (1930s-2004), American economist and accounting historian
- Minotte E. Chatfield (1859–1952), Connecticut businessman and politician
- Philip Chatfield (1927–2021), British born ballet dancer, choreographer and artistic director
- Robert Chatfield (born 1943), Connecticut politician
- Sarah Chatfield, English music video director
- Shoshana Chatfield (born 1965), United States Navy vice admiral
- Thomas Chatfield (1871–1922), New York federal judge
- Thomas I. Chatfield (1818–1884), New York politician
- Tom Chatfield (born 1980), British author, technology theorist and commentator
- Wayne Chatfield-Taylor (1893–1967), U.S. Under Secretary of Commerce and Assistant Secretary of the Treasury
- William Chatfield (1851–1930), New Zealand architect
- William A. Chatfield (born 1951), American government executive and lobbyist

== See also ==
- Chatfield-Taylor
