= Chatfield =

Chatfield may refer to:

== Places ==
- Chatfield, Arkansas
- Chatfield, Manitoba
- Chatfield, Minnesota
- Chatfield Township, Fillmore County, Minnesota
- Chatfield Township, Bottineau County, North Dakota
- Chatfield, Ohio
- Chatfield Township, Ohio
- Chatfield, Texas
- Chatfield Farmstead, Connecticut
- Chatfield Island, British Columbia
- Chatfield Reservoir, Colorado
- Chatfield State Park, Colorado

== Other uses ==
- Chatfield (surname)
