= William Wesley Cornell =

19th century iron tycoon

- Born: 1823
- Died: 1870 (aged 46–47)

William Wesley Cornell (1823 – 1870) was an industrialist and philanthropist from New York and the namesake of Cornell College in Iowa.

Cornell was born in western New York and moved to New York City at the age of twelve to become a blacksmith's apprentice. The blacksmith to whom he apprenticed brought Cornell to Jane-Street Methodist Episcopal Sunday School, and Cornell became a lifelong Methodist and later served as the Church's Sunday-school Superintendent. Cornell eventually started his own iron foundry with his brother, John Black Cornell (1821 – 1887). The firm was known as J. B. and W. W. Cornell and became one of the largest iron works in the region. Cornell was a major benefactor of many Christian organizations, a Methodist Sunday-school and Missionary Society, and he supported various young working men from modest means. After Cornell made a small donation to the Iowa Conference Seminary (Seminary Mount Vernon College) in 1855, the school was renamed after him without his knowledge or permission. Today, Cornell College still has an affiliation with the United Methodist Church. Cornell died at his home in Fort Washington.

Cornell was a distant cousin of Ezra Cornell, who later founded Cornell University in New York and William Cornell, settler of Scarborough, Ontario whom is the namesake of the planned community of Cornell, Ontario.
