= Cunningham Island =

Island in British Columbia, Canada

Coordinates: 52°14′00″N 127°59′00″W

Cunningham Island is an island in the North Coast region of the Canadian province of British Columbia. To its west is Chatfield Island, to its south Denny Island, and to its east the mainland. It was named by Captain Daniel Pender of the Beaver about 1866, after Thomas Cunningham, an early British Columbia settler. Its north and east coasts were first charted by George Vancouver in 1793.
