= Albert Smith (Maine politician) =

American politician (1793–1867)

Member of the U.S. House of Representatives from Maine's 2nd district
- In office March 4, 1839 – March 3, 1841
- Preceded by: Francis Ormand Jonathan Smith
- Succeeded by: William P. Fessenden

Member of the Maine House of Representatives
- In office 1820

Personal details
- Born: January 3, 1793 Hanover, Massachusetts, U.S.
- Died: May 29, 1867 (aged 74) Boston, Massachusetts, U.S.
- Resting place: Mount Auburn Cemetery, Cambridge, Massachusetts, U.S.
- Party: Democratic
- Spouse: Roxy Chaddock
- Education: Brown University
- Profession: Politician, lawyer

Albert Smith (January 3, 1793 – May 29, 1867) was a U.S. representative from Maine.

Born in Hanover, Massachusetts, Smith attended the common schools and was graduated from Brown University, Providence, Rhode Island, in 1813. He studied law, was admitted to the bar, and commenced practice in Portland, Maine, in 1817. He served as member of the Maine House of Representatives in 1820. He was United States Marshal for the district of Maine 1830–1838.

Smith was elected as a Democrat to the Twenty-sixth Congress (March 4, 1839 – March 3, 1841). He was an unsuccessful candidate for reelection in 1840 to the Twenty-seventh Congress. He died in Boston, Massachusetts, on May 29, 1867. He was interred in Mount Auburn Cemetery, Cambridge, Massachusetts.

U.S. House of Representatives
Preceded by Francis Smith	Member of the U.S. House of Representatives from Maine's 2nd congressional district March 4, 1839 – March 3, 1841	Succeeded by William P. Fessenden
