= Erie and Michigan Telegraph Company =

The Erie and Michigan Telegraph Company was formed by Francis Ormand Jonathan Smith to connect Buffalo, Cleveland, Detroit, Chicago and Milwaukee. Smith was a partner in ownership of the Morse patent. John James Speed was assigned to construct lines west of Detroit in 1845. The first portion was constructed by Jeptha Wade in 1847. Speed was named president when the company was organized, and later Ezra Cornell became president.

== See also ==
- Timeline of North American telegraphy
