= Lyman Truman =

American politician (1806–1881)

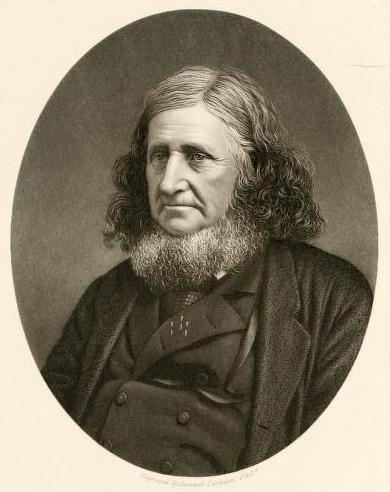
Lyman Truman

Lyman Truman (March 2, 1806 – March 24, 1881) was an American merchant, banker and politician from New York.

== Life ==
He was the son of Aaron Truman (1785–1823) and Experience (Park) Truman (1782–1844). He was born in that part of the Town of Spencer which in 1811 was separated as the Town of Candor, in Tioga County. In 1830, he removed to the county seat Owego, and became a clerk in the store of his uncle Asa H. Truman. In 1833, Lyman opened his own store and, in partnership with his brothers, conducted an extensive mercantile and lumber business until 1865. On January 10, 1838, he married Emily M. Goodrich (1817–1896), and they had four children.

He entered politics as a Democrat, became a Whig in 1833, joined the Free Soil Party in 1848, and the Republican Party upon its foundation in 1855. He was Supervisor of the Town of Owego in 1849 and 1857. He was President of the Bank of Owego, later the First National Bank of Owego, from 1856 until his death.

He was a member of the New York State Senate (24th D.) from 1858 to 1863, sitting in the 81st, 82nd, 83rd, 84th, 85th and 86th New York State Legislatures.

He was a member of the New York State Assembly (Tioga Co.) in 1869.

He died on March 24, 1881, in Owego.

== Sources ==
- The New York Civil List compiled by Franklin Benjamin Hough, Stephen C. Hutchins and Edgar Albert Werner (1867; pg. 442f)
- Biographical Sketches of the State Officers and Members of the Legislature of the State of New York in 1859 by William D. Murray (pg. 103ff)
- OBITUARY NOTES; The Hon. Lyman Truman died... in NYT on March 26, 1881

New York State Senate
Preceded by Samuel 69 Cuyler	New York State Senate; 24th District; 1858–1863	Succeeded by Ezra Cornell
New York State Assembly
Preceded by Oliver H. P. Kinney	New York State Assembly; Tioga County; 1869	Succeeded by John H. Deming
