= Chatfield-Taylor =

Chatfield-Taylor is a surname. Notable people with the surname include:

- Adele Chatfield-Taylor (born 1945), American arts administrator
- Hobart Chatfield-Taylor (1865–1945), American author
- Rose Farwell Chatfield-Taylor (1870–1918) American golfer, bookbinder, and socialite
- Wayne Chatfield-Taylor (1893–1967), a member of the Franklin D. Roosevelt administration

== See also ==
- Chatfield (surname)
- Taylor (surname)
- Chatham Taylor
