= Stephen Sweet =

American politician (1880–1920)

Member of the Connecticut House of Representatives from Voluntown
- In office 1915–1917
- Preceded by: William H. Dawley Jr.
- Succeeded by: Constant Chatfield

Personal details
- Born: November 1, 1880 Franklin, Connecticut, U.S.
- Died: May 2, 1920 (aged 39) Southbridge, Massachusetts, U.S.
- Party: Democratic
- Spouse: Mary Whipple
- Children: 2

Stephen Benoni Sweet (November 1, 1880 – May 2, 1920) was an American politician who served in the Connecticut House of Representatives from 1915 to 1917, representing the town of Voluntown as a Democrat. His father, J. Byron Sweet, was a state representative from Groton from 1911 to 1913.
