= Ezra Cornell =

American founder of Western Union, Cornell (1807–1874)

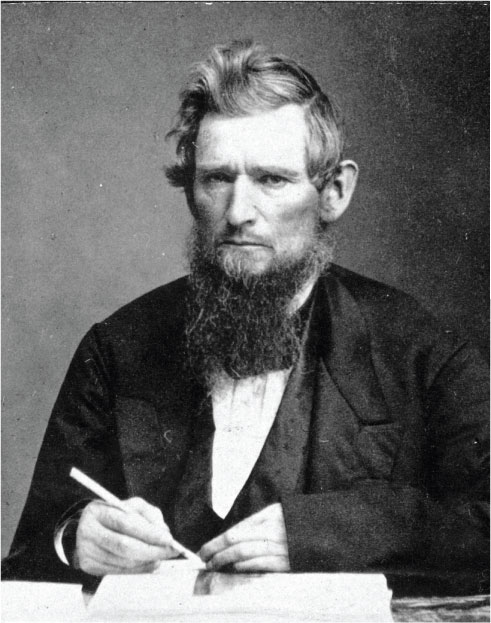

1st Chairman of Cornell University Board of Trustees
- In office 1870–1874
- Succeeded by: Henry W. Sage

Member of the New York Senate from the 24th district
- In office January 1, 1864 – December 31, 1867
- Preceded by: Lyman Truman
- Succeeded by: Orlow W. Chapman

Member of the New York State Assembly from the Tompkins County district
- In office January 1, 1862 – December 31, 1863
- Preceded by: Jeremiah W. Dwight
- Succeeded by: Henry B. Lord

President of the New York State Agricultural Society
- In office 1862
- Preceded by: George Geddes
- Succeeded by: Edward G. Faile

Personal details
- Born: January 11, 1807 Westchester Landing, The Bronx, New York, U.S.
- Died: December 9, 1874 (aged 67) Ithaca, New York, U.S.
- Party: Republican

Ezra Cornell (/kɔːrˈnɛl/; January 11, 1807 – December 9, 1874) was an American businessman, politician, academic, and philanthropist. He was involved in the founding of Western Union and a co-founder of Cornell University. He also served as president of the New York Agriculture Society and as a New York State Senator.

== Early life ==
Cornell was born in Westchester Landing at what is now 1515 Williamsbridge Road in Westchester Square, Bronx in New York City to Elijah Cornell and Eunice (Barnard), a potter. He was raised near DeRuyter, New York. He was a cousin of Paul Cornell, the founder of Chicago's Hyde Park neighborhood. He was also related to Ezekiel Cornell, a Revolutionary War general who represented Rhode Island in the Second Continental Congress from 1780 to 1782, and was a distant relative of William Cornell, who was an early settler from Rhode Island.

Cornell's earliest American patrilineal ancestor, Thomas Cornell (1595–1655), was a Puritan and a follower of Roger Williams and Anne Hutchinson before finally embracing Quakerism, the faith of his descendants.

== Career ==
Cornell initially pursued a career in carpentry and traveled extensively throughout New York State in the profession. Upon first setting eyes on Cayuga Lake and Ithaca, New York, in the spring of 1828, he decided that Ithaca would be his future home.

Cornell was hired as a mechanic by Otis Eddy to work at his cotton mill on Cascadilla Creek. On Eddy's recommendation, Jeremiah S. Beebe then hired Cornell to repair and overhaul his plaster and flour mills on Fall Creek. During Cornell's long association with Beebe, he designed and built a tunnel for a new mill race on Fall Creek, a stone dam on Fall Creek (which formed Beebe Lake), and a new flour mill. By 1832, Cornell was placed in charge of all Beebe's concerns at Fall Creek.

In 1831, Cornell married Mary Ann Wood in Dryden, New York. The young and growing family needed more income than he could earn as manager of Beebe's mills, so Cornell purchased rights in a patent for a new type of plow and began decades of traveling away from Ithaca. His territories for sales of the plow included the states of Maine and Georgia. He sold in Maine in the summer and the milder Georgia in the winter.

=== Telegraph ===
In 1842, Cornell happened into the offices of the Maine Farmer, where he saw an acquaintance, F.O.J. Smith, bent over some plans for a "scraper" as Smith called it. For services rendered, Smith had been granted a one-quarter share of the telegraph patent held by Samuel Morse, and was attempting to devise a way of burying the telegraph lines in the ground in lead pipe. Cornell devised a special kind of plow that would dig a 2 feet 6 inches (76 cm) ditch, lay the pipe and telegraph wire in the ditch, and cover it back up. It was later learned that condensation in the pipes and poor insulation of the wires impeded the electric current through the wire, so hanging wires from telegraph poles became the accepted method.

Cornell made his fortune in the telegraph business as an associate of Samuel Morse, and constructed and strung the poles for the Baltimore–Washington telegraph line, the first telegraph line of substance in the U.S. To address the problem of telegraph lines shorting out, he invented the use of glass insulators at the point where the lines were connected to supporting poles. After joining with Morse, Cornell supervised the development of many telegraph lines, including a portion of the New York, Albany & Buffalo line in 1846 and, along with his partners John James Speed and Francis Ormand Jonathan Smith, the Erie and Michigan Telegraph Company, which connected Buffalo with Milwaukee. Cornell, Speed, and Smith also built the New York and Erie line, which competed with and paralleled the New York, Albany and Buffalo line in which Morse had a major share. The line was completed in 1849 and Cornell was made president of the company.

In 1848, Cornell's sister, Phoebe, married Martin B. Wood and moved to Albion, Michigan. Cornell gave Wood a job constructing new lines and made Phoebe his telegraph operator, the first woman operator in the U.S.
Cornell earned a substantial fortune when the Erie and Michigan line was consolidated with his and Hiram Sibley's New York and Mississippi Valley Printing Telegraph Company to form the Western Union company. Cornell received $2 million in Western Union stock.

=== New York State Assembly ===
Cornell was a Republican member of the New York State Assembly representing Tompkins County in 1862 and 1863 and a member of the New York State Senate from 1864 to 1867, where he served in the 87th, 88th, 89th, and 90th New York State Legislatures.

=== Cornell Free Library ===
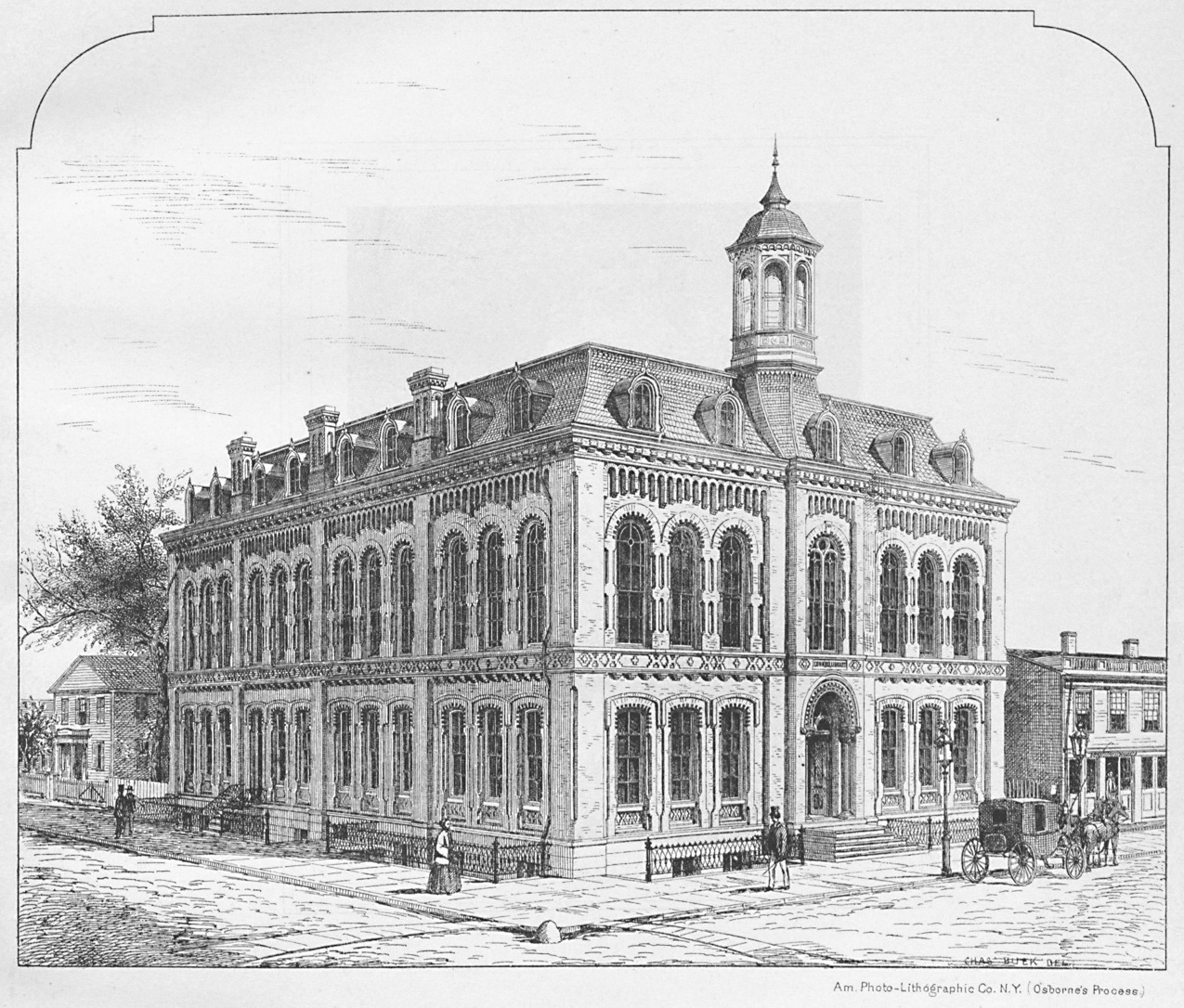
Cornell Free Library at Seneca and Tioga Streets in Ithaca, New York

Cornell retired from Western Union and turned his attention to philanthropy. He endowed the Cornell Free Library, the first public library for the citizens of Ithaca. The library was incorporated on April 5, 1864, and was formally presented to the town on December 20, 1866. The original library building stood at the corner of Tioga and Seneca street until it was demolished in 1960. The library evolved over time to serve the county as the Tompkins County Public Library.

To honor the 150th anniversary of his gift, a mural of Ezra Cornell was hung on the exterior wall of the current Tompkins County Public Library in October, 2016.

=== Cornell University founder ===
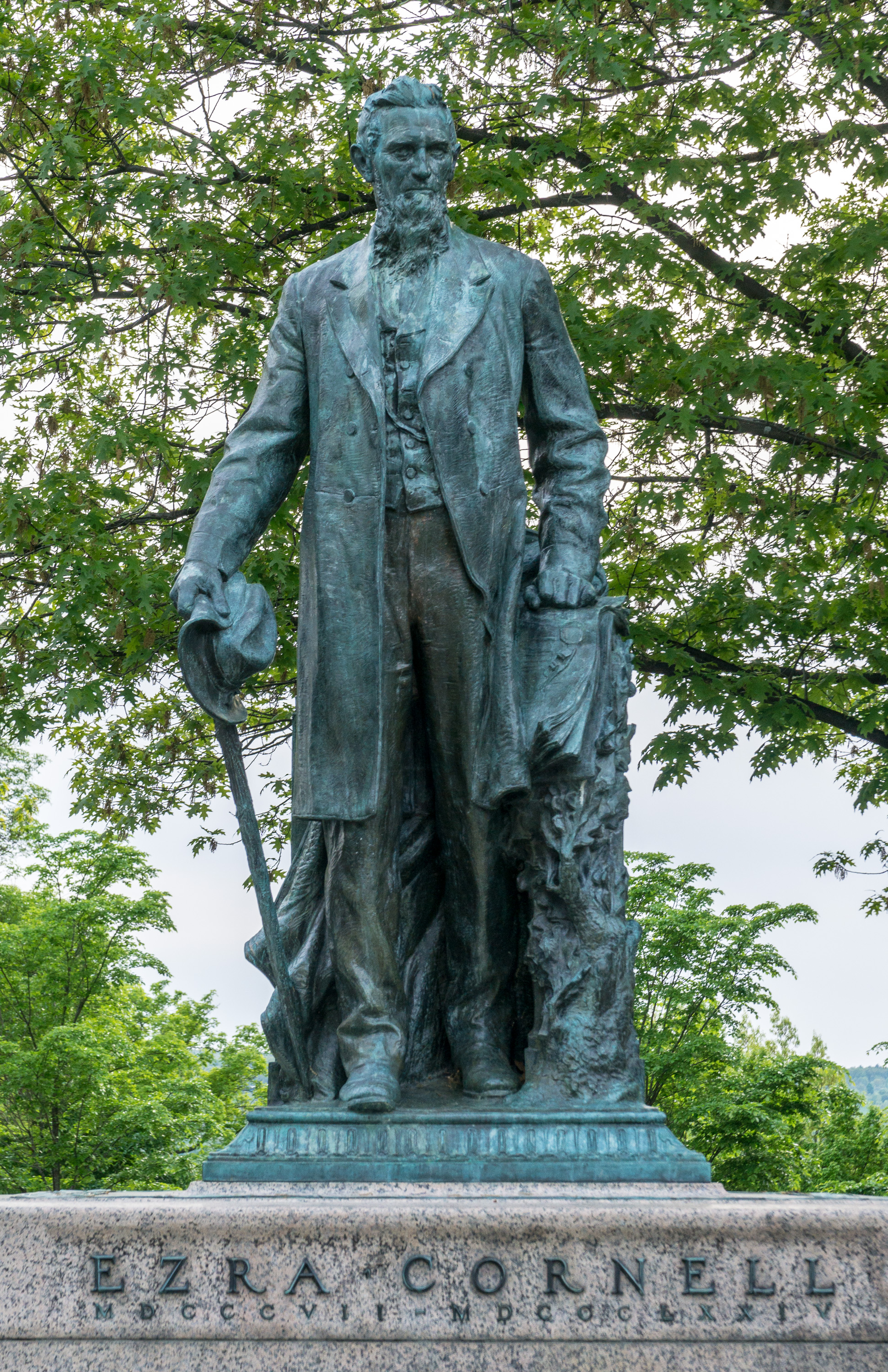
This bronze statue of Ezra Cornell by Hermon Atkins MacNeil was erected on Cornell University's Arts Quad in 1919.

A lifelong enthusiast of science and agriculture, he saw great opportunity in the 1862 Morrill Land-Grant Acts to found a university that would teach practical subjects on an equal basis with the classics favored by more traditional institutions. Andrew Dickson White helped secure the new institution's status as New York's land-grant university, and Cornell University was founded and granted a charter through their efforts in 1865.

Cornell University derived far greater revenues than earlier land grant colleges, largely from real estate transactions directed by Ezra Cornell. Under the land-grant program, the federal government issued the colleges scrip, documents granting the right to select a parcel of land. These colleges generally promptly sold their scrip. Ezra Cornell, however, held most of the scrip, anticipating it would increase in price. He also redeemed some scrip for promising land or for rights in timber, including pine forest in Wisconsin. While the first land-grant colleges received around half a dollar per acre, Cornell netted an average of over $5 per acre in 1905. Because of these timber holdings, the town of Cornell, Wisconsin, is named for Cornell.

=== Railroad business and letter writing ===
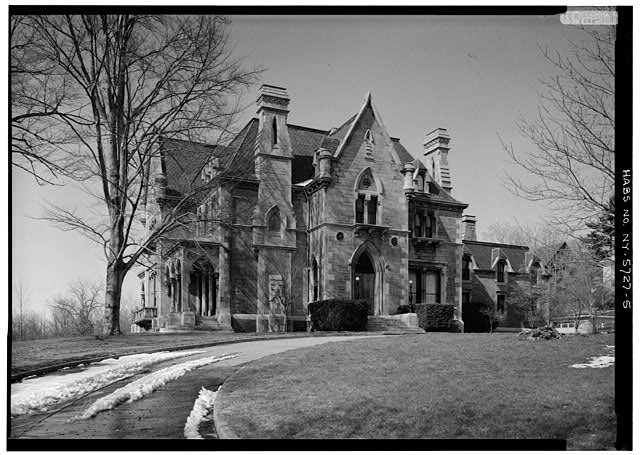
Llenroc was constructed by Cornell prior to his 1874 death; it is now the Delta Phi fraternity house at Cornell University.

Cornell entered the railroad business, but fared poorly due to the Panic of 1873. He began construction of a palatial Ithaca mansion, Llenroc, whose name was Cornell spelled in reverse, to replace his farmhouse, but died before it was completed. Llenroc was maintained by Cornell's heirs for several decades until being sold to Cornell University's chapter of the Delta Phi fraternity, which occupies it to this day; Forest Park, Cornell's farmhouse, was sold to Cornell University's Delta Tau Delta fraternity chapter but was later demolished.

Cornell corresponded with many people and would write dozens of letters each week. This was due partly to his wide traveling and also to the many business associates he maintained during his years as an entrepreneur and later as a politician and university founder. Cornell University has made the approximately 30,000 letters in the Cornell Correspondence available online.

== Personal life ==
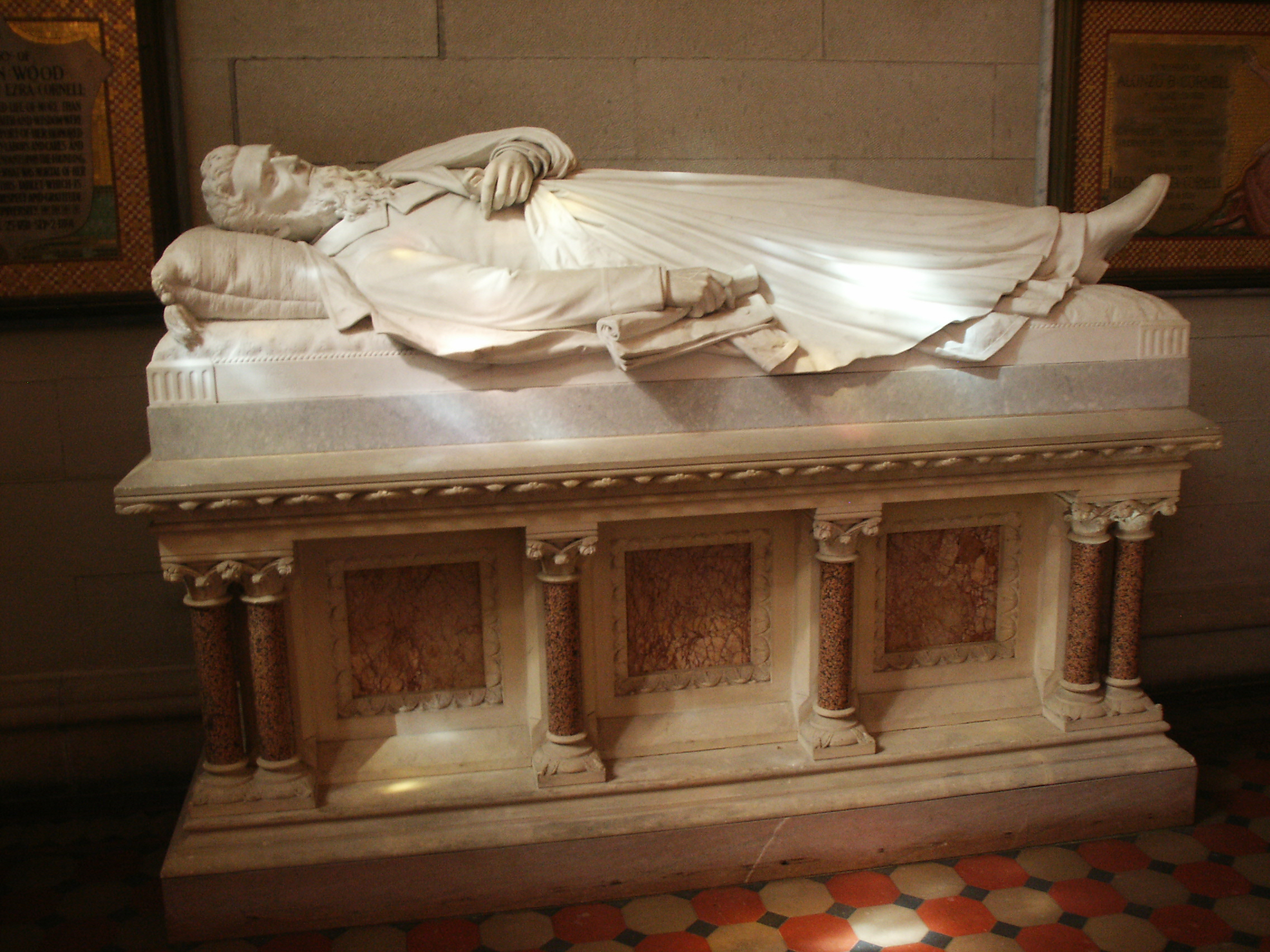
Cornell's sarcophagus in Sage Chapel at Cornell University

Ezra Cornell was a birthright Quaker, but was later disowned by the Society of Friends for marrying outside the faith to a "world's woman", Mary Ann Wood, a Methodist, on March 19, 1831.

On February 24, 1832, Cornell wrote the following response to his expulsion from The Society of Friends due to his marriage: "I have always considered that choosing a companion for life was a very important affair and that my happiness or misery in this life depended on the choice."

He died in 1874. Cornell is interred in Sage Chapel on Cornell's campus along with Daniel Willard Fiske and Jennie McGraw. Cornell was originally buried in Ithaca City Cemetery in Ithaca and later moved to Sage Chapel.

His eldest son, Alonzo B. Cornell, was later governor of New York. Since its founding, the university's charter specified that the eldest lineal descendant of Cornell is granted a life seat on Cornell University's board of trustees, currently Charles Ezra Cornell. (Charles Ezra Cornell took the post on November 17, 1969.)

In 1990, G. David Low, graduate of Cornell University and Space Shuttle astronaut, took with him into outer space a pair of tan silk socks worn by Ezra Cornell on his wedding day in 1831.

== See also ==
- Henry Wells
- Mary Morrill Foulger, Ezra's 4th great-grandmother and Benjamin Franklin's grandmother
- Peter Foulger, Ezra's 4th great-grandfather and Benjamin Franklin's grandfather
- Cornell, Ontario, a planned community named after Cornell's distant relative William Cornell
- William Wesley Cornell

== Sources ==
- The New York Times op-ed "A Colony With a Conscience" December 27, 2007

New York State Assembly
Preceded by Jeremiah W. Dwight	New York State Assembly; Tompkins County; 1862–1863	Succeeded by Henry B. Lord
New York State Senate
Preceded by Lyman Truman	New York State Senate; 24th District; 1864–1867	Succeeded by Orlow W. Chapman
Academic offices
Preceded by None	Chairman of Cornell Board of Trustees; 1866–1874	Succeeded by Henry W. Sage
