= Orlow W. Chapman =

American politician (1832–1890)

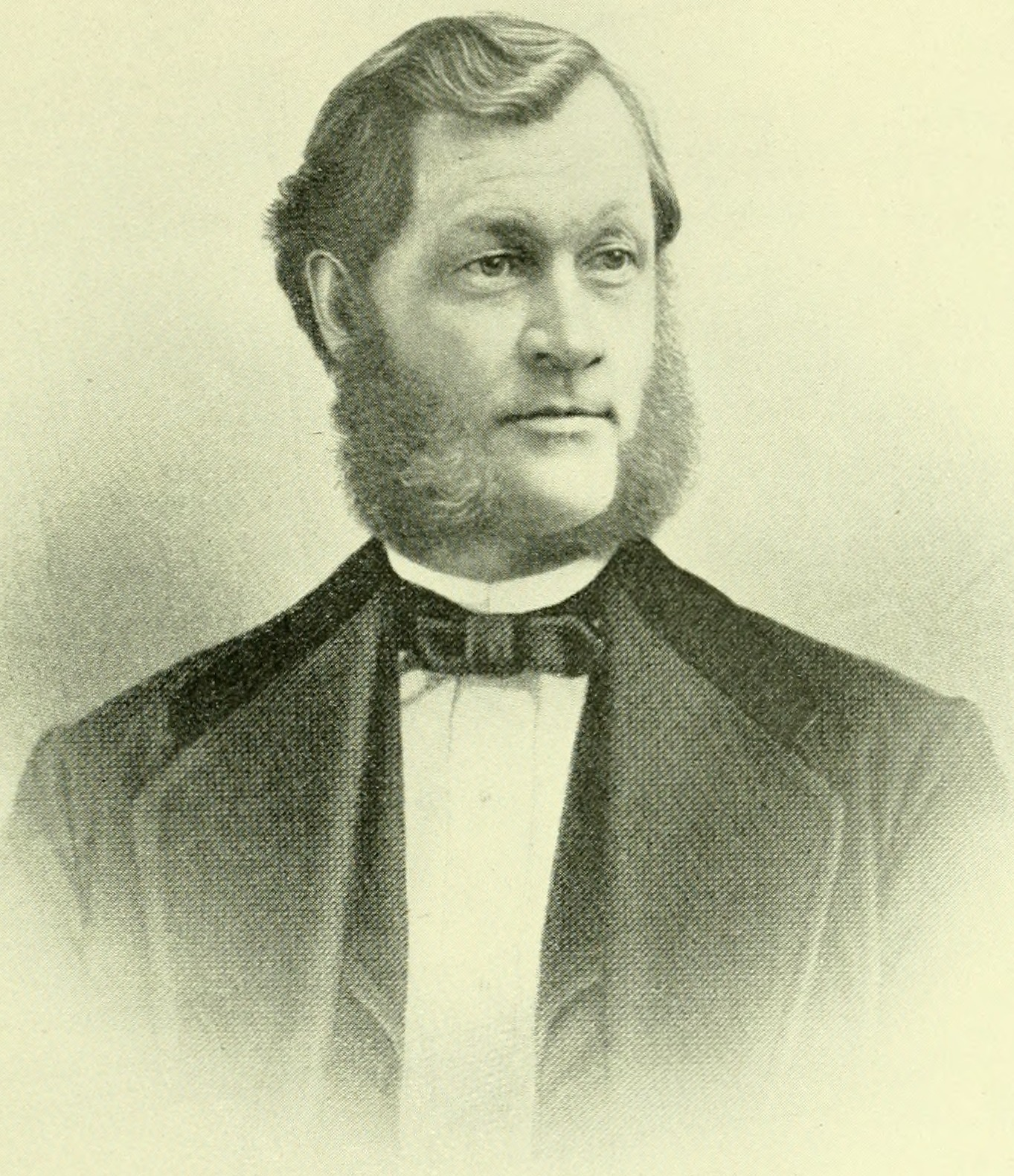
- Chapman in 1900 publication

5th United States Solicitor General
- In office 1889–1890
- Appointed by: Benjamin Harrison
- Preceded by: George A. Jenks
- Succeeded by: William Howard Taft

Member of the New York Senate from the 24th district
- In office 1868–1871
- Preceded by: Ezra Cornell
- Succeeded by: Thomas I. Chatfield

Personal details
- Born: January 7, 1832 Ellington, Connecticut, U.S.
- Died: January 19, 1890 (aged 58) Washington, D.C., U.S.
- Resting place: Spring Forest Cemetery
- Parent: Calvin Chapman (father)
- Education: Union College (BA)

Orlow W. Chapman (January 7, 1832 – January 19, 1890) was an American politician from New York. He served as United States Solicitor General from 1889 until his death in 1890.

== Early life ==
Orlow W. Chapman was born on January 7, 1832, in Ellington, Connecticut, to Hortensia (née Dorman) and Calvin Chapman. His father was a member of the Connecticut State Legislature. While in Ellington, Chapman received his primary education in a local academy in Ellington. He then proceeded to graduate from Union College of Schenectady, New York, in 1854 with a Bachelor of Arts. He was a member of Phi Beta Kappa.

After earning his undergraduate degree, he spent one year as Professor of Languages in the Fergusonville Academy in Delaware County. Chapman then studied law under Robert Parker of Parker & Gleason in Delhi, New York. In 1857, he was admitted to the bar.

== Career ==
In 1858, Chapman moved to Binghamton, New York, and established a law practice. He was appointed district attorney of Broome County by Governor Edwin D. Morgan in 1862. He served in that role until 1867. In 1868, he formed a partnership with C. E. Martin. He remained in that partnership until Martin became a judge. He then partnered with George F. Lyon. Chapman remained in that partnership until his death.

Chapman was a member of the New York State Senate (24th D.) from 1868 to 1871, sitting in the 91st, 92nd, 93rd and 94th New York State Legislatures. Subsequently, he was appointed Superintendent of New York State Insurance Department, where he served until his resignation on January 31, 1876. During Chapman’s time as superintendent he also served as president of the National Insurance Commissioners’ Association and he focused on eliminating corrupt states’ fostering of large and fraudulent companies. During his term Chapman also initiated the creation of an Executive Committee formed from and elected by Insurance Superintendents from each state.

On May 29, 1889, President Harrison appointed Chapman Solicitor General of the United States. He remained in that role until his death.

== Personal life ==
Chapman died of pneumonia on January 19, 1890, while working in Washington, D.C. He was buried at Spring Forest Cemetery.

New York State Senate
Preceded by Ezra Cornell	New York State Senate; 24th District; 1868–1871	Succeeded by Thomas I. Chatfield
