= John James Speed =

American politician

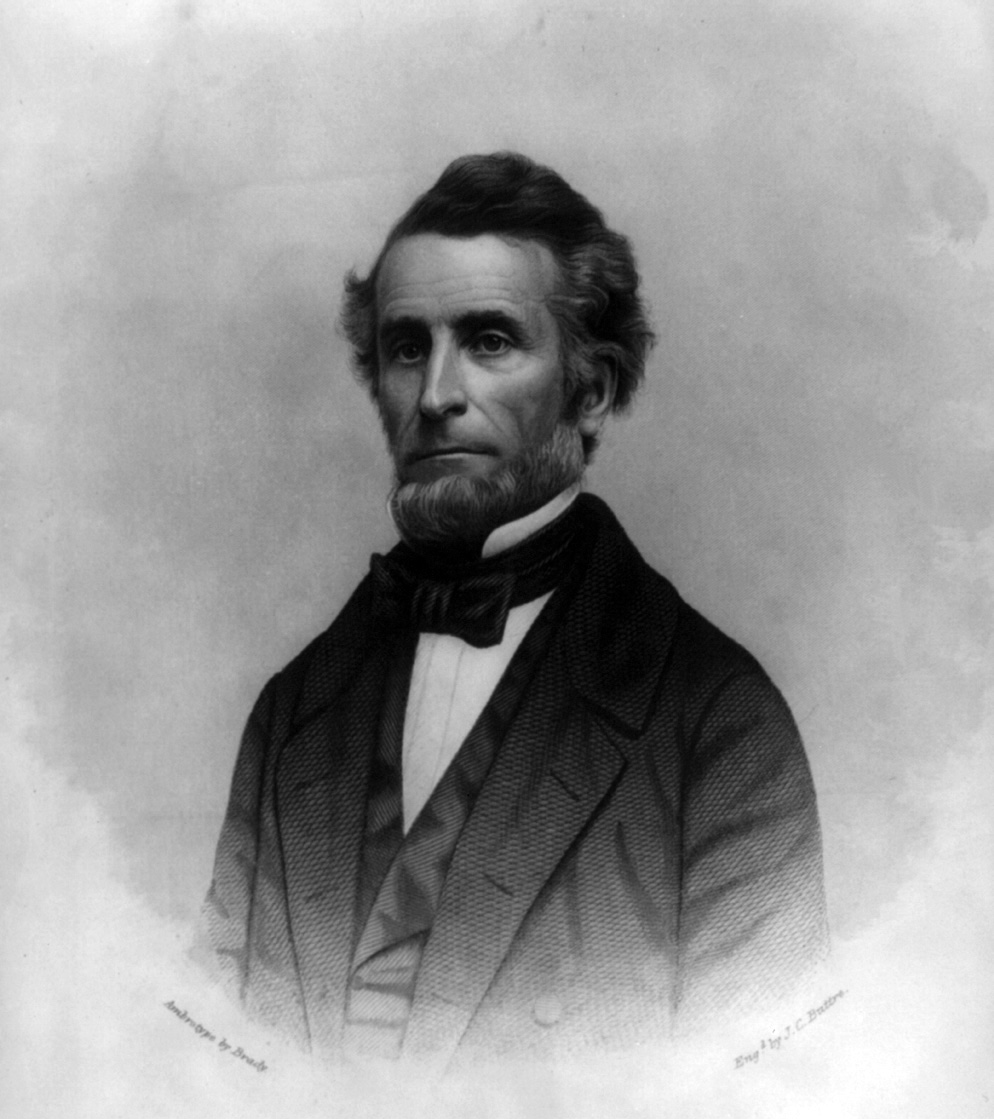
John James Speed, Jr.

John James Speed, Jr. (July 20, 1803 – June 15, 1867) was an American farmer, merchant, politician, and pioneer in telegraphy.

== Biography ==
Speed was born in Mecklenburg County, Virginia, on July 20, 1803, and his family moved to Caroline, New York, in 1807. Speed was educated in Caroline and became a farmer before relocating to Ithaca to become a merchant. In 1832 he married Anne Sophia Morrell, an aunt of Theodore L. Cuyler.

He was active in the New York Militia in the 1820s and 1830s, and became commander of a regiment with the rank of colonel. A Whig in politics, in 1832 he was elected to the New York State Assembly, and in 1838 he was elected a trustee of the village of Ithaca as well as Town Supervisor of the town of Ithaca. In 1843 he was elected President of the village trustees. In 1840 he was a presidential elector, and cast his ballot for William Henry Harrison and John Tyler.

Speed lost his mercantile fortune in the Panic of 1837 and turned to telegraphy to recover. In the 1840s he experimented with both visual and electric telegraphs. In Ithaca he was friends with Ezra Cornell and together they became agents for Samuel Morse's partner Francis Ormand Jonathan Smith, who had become the agent for the Morse patent in the states of Michigan, Ohio, Indiana, Illinois, and Wisconsin.

Smith contracted with Cornell and Speed in 1847 to build a line from Buffalo to Detroit, Chicago and Milwaukee, and Speed moved to Detroit. Speed built the section from Detroit west. He made a sub-contract with Jeptha Wade for the construction of a line from Detroit to Jackson, the first line completed west of Buffalo in the summer of 1847. When the line reached Chicago it was organized at the Erie and Michigan Telegraph Company with Speed as President. Direct contact was established between Chicago and Buffalo in January, 1849. However, the line was not well constructed and revenues were initially small.

Speed and Taliferro Shaffner connected the eastern and western hemispheres with a line from Greenland, Iceland and the Faroe Islands. During the American Civil War he constructed a telegraph line from Washington, D.C. to Portland, Maine. He continued to invent, and received patents for his improvements to the telegraph. In his later years he left the telegraph business and became involved in iron manufacturing.

== Death ==
Speed died in Brooklyn, New York, on June 15, 1867. He was buried at Green-Wood Cemetery.
