= Thomas I. Chatfield =

American politician (1818–1884)

Thomas Ives Chatfield (September 16, 1818 in Great Barrington, Berkshire County, Massachusetts – May 2, 1884 in Owego, Tioga County, New York) was an American merchant and politician from New York.

== Life ==
He was the son of John Chatfield (1792–1865). He attended the common schools, and then learned the baker's trade. In 1839, he removed to Owego, worked there as a baker, and soon became the owner of the bakery. On November 9, 1841, he married Mary Purdy Bundy (1822–1857). In 1845, he opened a grocery store, and later engaged also in the wholesale of groceries.

He was a Whig member of the New York State Assembly (Tioga Co.) in 1853. On June 22, 1858, he married Lucy Benton Goodrich (1830–1903), and their son was Federal Judge Thomas Chatfield (1871–1922).

He was a delegate to the 1868 Republican National Convention. At the New York state election, 1869, he ran on the Republican ticket for New York State Treasurer but was defeated by Democrat Wheeler H. Bristol. Chatfield was a member of the New York State Senate (24th D.) in 1872 and 1873.

He was buried at the Evergreen Cemetery in Owego.

== Sources ==
- The New York Civil List compiled by Franklin Benjamin Hough, Stephen C. Hutchins and Edgar Albert Werner (1870; pg. 477)
- Life Sketches of Executive Officers and Members of the Legislature of the State of New York by William H. McElroy & Alexander McBride (1873; pg. 61f) [e-book]
- Bio transcribed from Outr County and Its People: A Memorial History of Tioga County by LeRoy W. Kingman
- The Hon. Thomas I. Chatfield...died... in NYT on May 3, 1884

New York State Assembly
Preceded by William Pierson	New York State Assembly; Tioga County; 1853	Succeeded by Lewis P. Legg
New York State Senate
Preceded by Orlow W. Chapman	New York State Senate; 24th District; 1872–1873	Succeeded by John H. Selkreg
