= Constant Chatfield =

American sea captain and politician (1849–1921)

Member of the Connecticut House of Representatives from Voluntown
- In office 1917–1921
- Preceded by: Stephen Sweet
- Succeeded by: Thomas A. Brown

Personal details
- Born: January 4, 1849 Chester, Connecticut, U.S.
- Died: December 11, 1921 (aged 72) Voluntown, Connecticut, U.S.
- Party: Republican
- Spouse: Emily B. Chatfield

Constant Webb Chatfield (January 4, 1849 – December 11, 1921) was an American sea captain and politician who served in the Connecticut House of Representatives from 1917 to 1921, representing the town of Voluntown as a Republican. Chatfield was the captain of the schooner Lyman M. Law for 14 years, until its sale in June 1916. The schooner sank in February 1917 when it was torpedoed by an Austrian submarine. Chatfield's wife, Emily B. Chatfield, also served as a state representative.
