= Thomas Chatfield =

American judge (1871–1922)

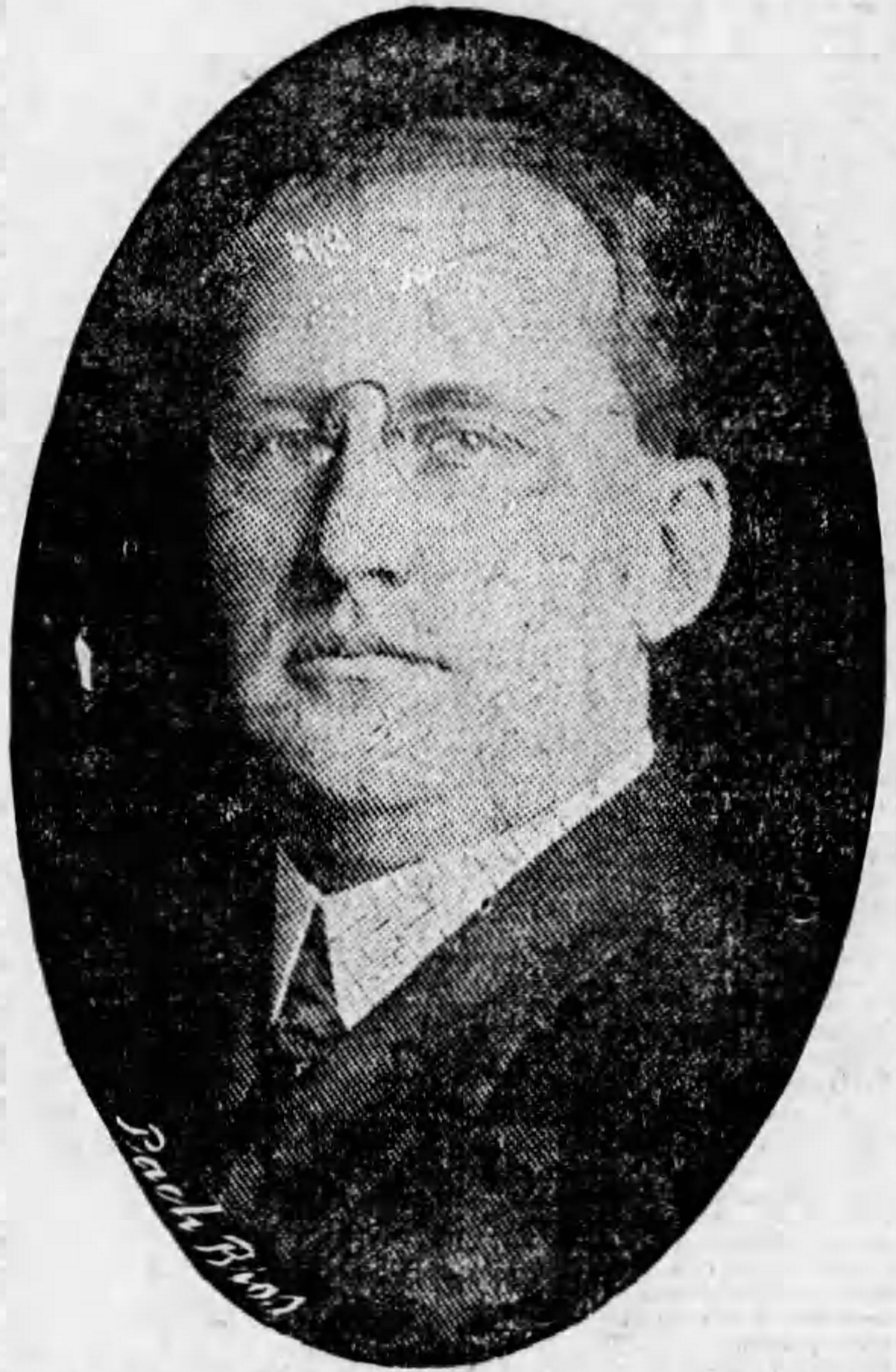

Judge of the United States District Court for the Eastern District of New York
- In office January 9, 1907 – December 24, 1922
- Appointed by: Theodore Roosevelt
- Preceded by: Edward B. Thomas
- Succeeded by: Robert Alexander Inch

Personal details
- Born: Thomas Ives Chatfield; October 4, 1871 Owego, New York
- Died: December 24, 1922 (aged 51) Brooklyn, New York
- Parent: Thomas I. Chatfield (father)
- Education: Yale University (A.B.); Columbia Law School (LL.B.)

Thomas Ives Chatfield (October 4, 1871 – December 24, 1922) was a United States district judge of the United States District Court for the Eastern District of New York.

== Education and career ==
Born on October 4, 1871, in Owego, New York, Chatfield received an Artium Baccalaureus degree in 1893 from Yale University. He received a Bachelor of Laws in 1896 from Columbia Law School. He entered private practice in New York City, New York from 1896 to 1906. He was an Assistant United States Attorney for the Eastern District of New York from 1902 to 1906.

== Federal judicial service ==
Chatfield was nominated by President Theodore Roosevelt on December 13, 1906, to a seat on the United States District Court for the Eastern District of New York vacated by Judge Edward B. Thomas. He was confirmed by the United States Senate on January 9, 1907, and received his commission the same day. His service terminated on December 24, 1922, due to his death at his home in Brooklyn, New York. He had been stricken with a heart attack while trimming the family Christmas tree, the heart attack having been induced by a bout of typhoid fever from which he suffered the previous summer.

== Family ==
Chatfield was the son of State Senator Thomas I. Chatfield (1818–1884) and Lucy B. (Goodrich) Chatfield.

Legal offices
Preceded by Edward B. Thomas	Judge of the United States District Court for the Eastern District of New York; 1907–1922	Succeeded by Robert Alexander Inch
