= Chatfield Island =

Island in British Columbia, Canada

Coordinates: 52°16′00″N 128°04′30″W

Chatfield Island is an island in the North Coast region of the Canadian province of British Columbia. To its north and west is Yeo Island, and to its east, Cunningham Island. It was named in 1876 by the Hydrographic Office of the British Admiralty after Captain Alfred John Chatfield, RN (1831-1910). Its north coast was charted in 1793 by George Vancouver, and its west coast by one of his lieutenants, James Johnstone, later that year.
