= Francis Ormand Jonathan Smith =

American politician

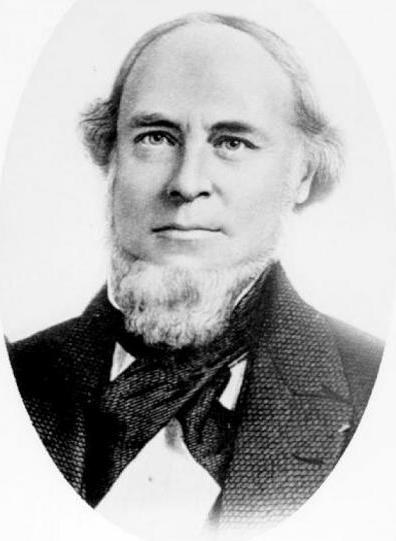

Member of the U.S. House of Representatives from Maine's 2nd district
- In office March 4, 1833 – March 3, 1839
- Preceded by: John Anderson
- Succeeded by: Albert Smith

Personal details
- Born: November 23, 1806 Brentwood, New Hampshire, US
- Died: October 14, 1876 (aged 69) Deering, Maine, US
- Resting place: F.O.J. Smith Tomb
- Party: Democratic
- Occupation: lawyer and financier

Francis Ormand Jonathan Smith (Brentwood, New Hampshire, November 23, 1806; Deering, Maine, October 14, 1876) was a U.S. lawyer, legislator, and telegraph pioneer and financier.

He was elected from the state of Maine to the United States House of Representatives to serve three terms from 1833 to 1839, and business partner of Samuel Morse.

== Biography ==
Smith was educated at Phillips Exeter Academy in Exeter, New Hampshire, and eventually was admitted to the bar to practice law in Portland, Maine. He served in the Maine House of Representatives in 1831, was a member of the Maine Senate in 1833, and served as its president. He was elected as a Jacksonian to the Twenty-third and Twenty-fourth Congresses and as a Democrat to the Twenty-fifth Congress (March 4, 1833 – March 3, 1839). He chaired the Committee on Commerce (Twenty-fifth Congress), and was subsequently an unsuccessful candidate for reelection in 1838 to the Twenty-sixth Congress.

Smith assisted Samuel F. B. Morse in perfecting and introducing the electric telegraph, and was a financial backer of the first telegraph lines set up in the United States.

He is interred in Evergreen Cemetery in Portland. He is buried in the F.O.J. Smith Tomb, which is listed on the National Register of Historic Places.

== Telegraph history ==
Samuel Morse came to Smith hoping for his support to obtain a grant from Congress to build an experimental telegraph line. Smith offered to become Morse's counsel, publicity man, and promotional agent for his invention. Smith was taken into partnership in 1838 and given a quarter interest in the patent. Smith furnished Morse with funds for a trip to Europe to seek patent rights there. Smith authored a bill to appropriate $30,000 for a line between Washington and Baltimore. This funding may be the first instance of government support to a private researcher, especially funding for applied (as opposed to basic or theoretical) research. Relations between the two men quickly soured however, due to Smith's frequent unfounded claims against Morse. In a letter to his own agent, Mr. Kendall, of January 4, 1851, Morse wrote, "Please tell me how matters stand in relation to [F. O. J. Smith]. I wish nothing short of entire separation from that unprincipled man if it can possibly be acommplished. . . I can suffer his frauds upon myself with comparative forbearance, but my indignation boils when I am made, nolens volens, a particeps criminis in his frauds on others. I will not endure it if I must suffer the loss of all the property I hold in the world."

The line was finally built and the first message sent in 1844. Smith was contractor for construction of the line. Line construction got off to a bad start and when failure was expected, Smith threatened to sue Morse for reimbursement of Smith's construction expenses. Smith was the contractor for construction of the New York and Boston Magnetic Telegraph.

The line opened June 27, 1846, but performed poorly. Smith switched his attention from New England to the Northwest to develop income from the patent for himself. Ezra Cornell and John James Speed became Smith's agents for the Morse patent in the Northwest—Michigan, Ohio, Wisconsin, Illinois, and Indiana, Cornell and Speed organized the Erie and Michigan line to connect Buffalo, Cleveland, Detroit, Chicago and Milwaukee. Because of patent disputes, Smith lost control. Smith's dream of a western telegraph empire were dashed when the Directors of the Erie and Michigan Telegraph failed to issue him stock. Smith wanted a link to the eastern seaboard without using the Magnetic Telegraph Company's New York, Albany, and Buffalo main line in which Morse had a substantial interest.

To this end he organized the New York and Erie Telegraph south of Morse's line. This line constructed by Cornell and Speed was unsuccessful and went bankrupt. Before the Trans-Atlantic cable, Smith played a strategic role in forwarding the latest European news to northeast newspapers when ships docked in Halifax before sailing to Boston and New York.

== Personal life ==
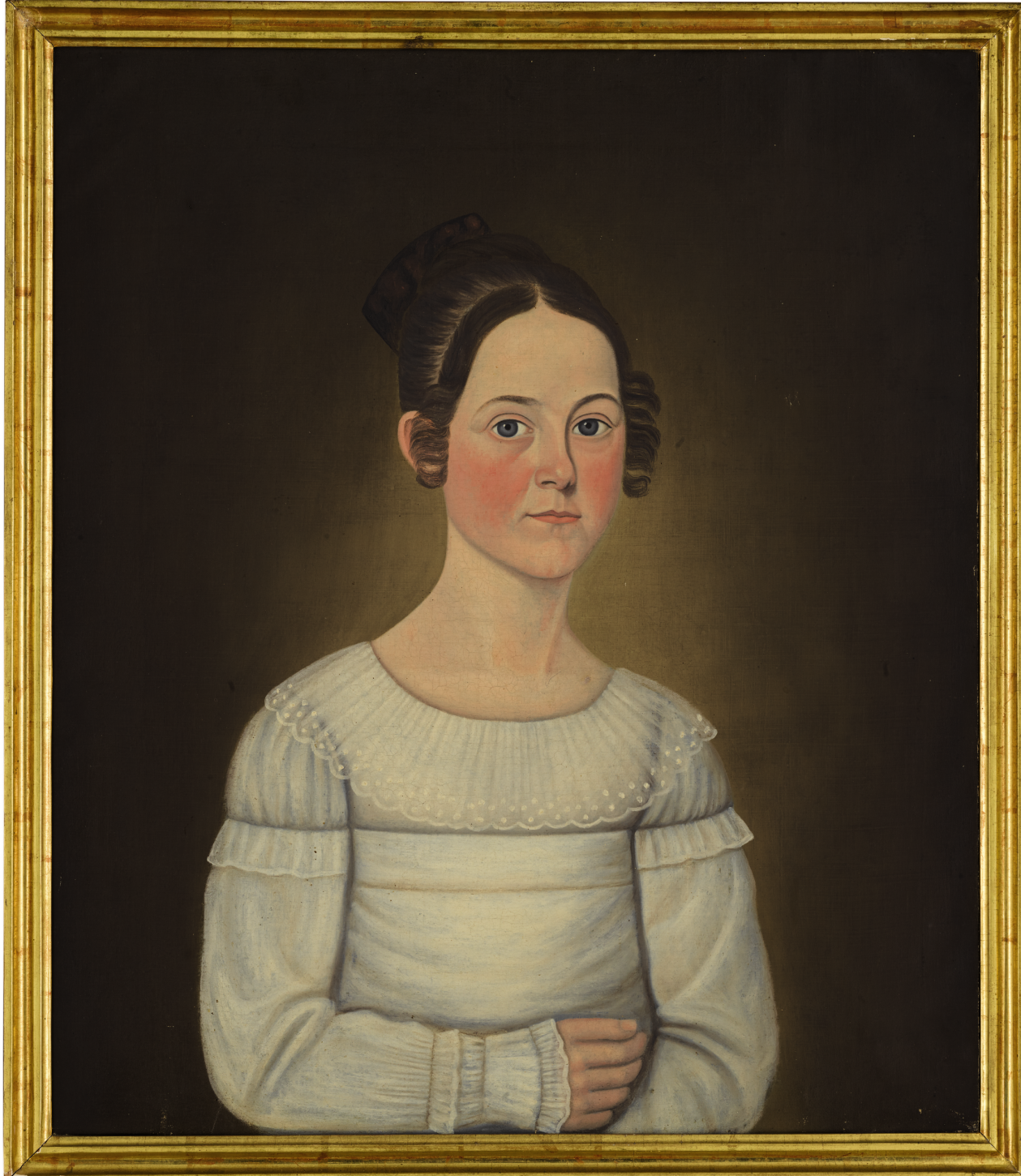
Smith's wife, Junia Loretta Bartlett

His wife was the sister of Luella J. B. Case, author, poet, and hymn writer.

Political offices
Preceded by Joshua Hall	10th President of the Maine Senate; 1832	Succeeded by Joseph Williamson
U.S. House of Representatives
Preceded by John Anderson	Member of the U.S. House of Representatives from Maine's 2nd congressional district March 4, 1833 – March 3, 1839	Succeeded by Albert Smith
