= Senator Lewis =

Senator Lewis may refer to:

== Members of the United States Senate ==
- Dixon Hall Lewis (1802–1848), U.S. Senator from Alabama from 1844 to 1848
- J. Hamilton Lewis (1863–1939), U.S. Senator from Illinois from 1913 to 1919 and again from 1931 to 1939
- John F. Lewis (1818–1895), U.S. Senator from Virginia 1870 to 1875

== United States state senate members ==
- Albert B. Lewis (1925–2021), New York State Senate
- Bob Lewis (Washington politician) (1925–2015), Washington State Senate
- Bonnie Titcomb Lewis, Maine State Senate
- Brian J. Lewis (born 1929), Washington State Senate
- Dave Lewis (politician) (born 1942), Montana State Senate
- David John Lewis (1869–1952), Maryland State Senate
- Earl Ramage Lewis (1887–1956), Ohio State Senate
- Frank Lewis (Nebraska politician) (born 1939), Nebraska State Senate
- Gerald Lewis (politician) (1934–2022), Florida State Senate
- H. Craig Lewis (1944–2013), Pennsylvania State Senate
- Helmar Lewis (1900–1999), Wisconsin State Senate
- James T. Lewis (1819–1904), Wisconsin State Senate
- James Lewis (Indiana politician) (1930–2016), Indiana State Senate
- Jason Lewis (Massachusetts politician) (born 1968), Massachusetts State Senate
- Jerry Lewis (Arizona politician) (born 1956), Arizona State Senate
- John W. Lewis Jr. (1906–1977), Illinois State Senate
- John Lewis (California politician) (born 1954), California State Senate
- Loran L. Lewis (1825–1916), New York State Senate
- Morgan Lewis (governor) (1754–1844), New York State Senate
- Patty Lewis (fl. 2020s), Missouri State Senate
- Phil Lewis (Florida politician) (1929–2012), Florida State Senate
- Robert S. Lewis (1856–1956), North Dakota State Senate
- Seth Lewis (fl. 2020s), Illinois State Senate
- Thomas Lewis (Kentucky politician) (1749–1809), Kentucky State Senate
- Tom Lewis (American politician) (1924–2003), Florida State Senate
- William Lewis (New York politician) (1827–1891), New York State Senate

== Other ==
- John Wood Lewis Sr. (1801–1865), Confederate States Senator from Georgia from 1862 to 1863
