= 1873 United States Senate election in New York =

- January 21, 1873

Majority vote of each house needed to win
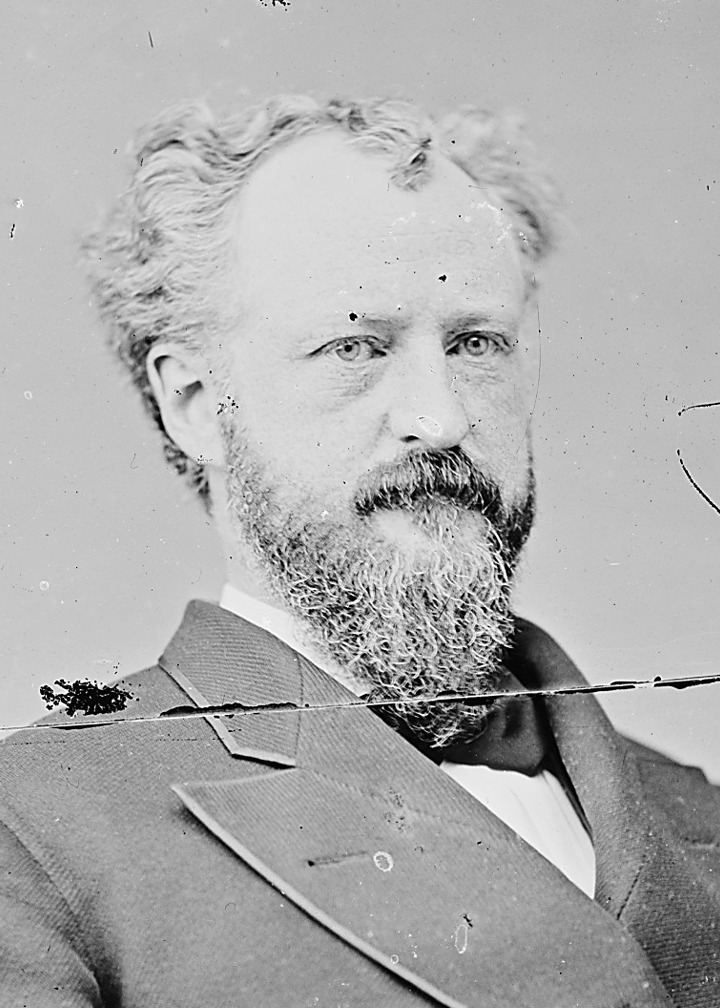

Nominee	Roscoe Conkling	Charles Wheaton
Party	Republican	Democratic
Senate	20	5
Percentage	62.5%	15.6%
Assembly	92	26
Percentage	71.88%	20.31%
Senator before election
Roscoe Conkling
Republican
Elected Senator
Roscoe Conkling
Republican

The 1873 United States Senate election in New York was held on January 21, 1873, by the New York State Legislature to elect a U.S. senator (Class 3) to represent the State of New York in the United States Senate.

== Background ==
Republican Roscoe Conkling had been elected in January 1867 to this seat, and his term would expire on March 3, 1873.

At the State election in November 1871, 21 Republicans and 11 Democrats were elected for a two-year term (1872–1873) in the State Senate. In 1872, a faction of the Republican Party opposed the re-election of President Ulysses S. Grant and the Radical Republicans who supported him, and under the name Liberal Republican Party nominated a joint ticket with the Democratic Party. At the State election in November 1872, 91 Republicans, 35 Democrats and 2 Independents were elected for the session of 1873 to the Assembly. The 96th New York State Legislature met from January 7 to May 30, 1873, at Albany, New York.

== Candidates ==
=== Republican caucus ===
The caucus of Republican State legislators met on January 8, State Senator William B. Woodin, of Auburn (25th D.), presided. 18 state senators and 88 assemblymen were present. They re-nominated the incumbent U.S. Senator Conkling unanimously.

=== Democratic caucus ===
The caucus of the Democratic State legislators nominated Ex-First Judge of Dutchess County Charles Wheaton.

== Result ==
Roscoe Conkling was the choice of both the Assembly and the State Senate, and was declared elected.

1873 United States Senator election result
House	Republican		Democratic		Republican		Liberal Republican	
State Senate (32 members)	Roscoe Conkling	20	Charles Wheaton	5	William M. Evarts	1	Henry R. Selden	1
State Assembly (128 members)	Roscoe Conkling	92	Charles Wheaton	26				

Notes:

- The vote for Ex-U.S. Attorney General Evarts was cast by Norman M. Allen (32nd D.), the vote for Ex-Judge of the New York Court of Appeals Selden by Gabriel T. Harrower (27th D.). Allen, Harrower and Abiah W. Palmer (11th D.) were the three Liberal Republicans in the State Senate.
- The votes were cast on January 21, but both Houses met in a joint session on January 22 to compare nominations, and declare the result.

== Aftermath ==
Conkling was re-elected in 1879, and remained in office until May 17, 1881, when he resigned in protest against the distribution of federal patronage in New York by President James A. Garfield without being consulted. The crisis between the Stalwart and the Half-Breed factions of the Republican party arose when the leader of the New Yorker Half-Breeds William H. Robertson was appointed Collector of the Port of New York, a position Conkling wanted to give to one of his Stalwart friends.

== See also ==
- United States Senate elections, 1872 and 1873

== Sources ==
- Members of the 43rd United States Congress
- ALBANY.; Unanimous Nomination of Roscoe Conkling for U.S. Senator in NYT on January 9, 1873
- ALBANY.; Nomination of Roscoe Conkling as United States Senator in NYT on January 22, 1873
- The Life and Letters of Roscoe Conkling: Orator, Statesman and Advocate by Alfred R. Conkling (page 449) [gives wrong date for governor's inauguration "January 6", the inauguration happens invariably on January 1; and adds non-existent middle initial "G."]
