= Senator Benedict =

Senator Benedict may refer to:

- Erastus C. Benedict (1800–1880), New York State Senate
- Henry S. Benedict (1878–1930), California State Senate
- Willis E. Benedict (1858–1917), South Dakota Senate
