= Senator Miner =

Senator Miner may refer to:

- Ahiman Louis Miner (1804–1886), Vermont State Senate
- Craig Miner (fl. 1980s–2010s), Connecticut State Senate
- Doris Miner (born 1936), South Dakota State Senate
- Eliphalet S. Miner (1818–1890), Wisconsin State Senate
- Phineas Miner (1777–1839), Connecticut State Senate

== See also ==
- Senator Minor (disambiguation)
- Sarah Minear (fl. 1980s–2010s), West Virginia State Senate
- Theodore L. Minier (1819–1895), New York State Senate
- Ruth Ann Minner (born 1935), Delaware State Senate
