= 95th New York State Legislature =

New York state legislative session

←	94th	96th	→
- The Old State Capitol (1879)

Overview
- Legislative body: New York State Legislature
- Jurisdiction: New York, United States
- Term: January 1 – December 31, 1872

Senate
- Members: 32
- President: Lt. Gov. Allen C. Beach (D)
- Temporary President: William B. Woodin (R)
- Party control: Republican (24-5-2)

Assembly
- Members: 128
- Speaker: Henry Smith (R)
- Party control: Republican (98-26-4)

Sessions
- 1st: January 2 – May 14, 1872

The 95th New York State Legislature, consisting of the New York State Senate and the New York State Assembly, met from January 2 to May 14, 1872, during the fourth year of John T. Hoffman's governorship, in Albany.

== Background ==
Under the provisions of the New York Constitution of 1846, 32 Senators and 128 assemblymen were elected in single-seat districts; senators for a two-year term, assemblymen for a one-year term. The senatorial districts were made up of entire counties, except New York County (five districts) and Kings County (two districts). The Assembly districts were made up of entire towns, or city wards, forming a contiguous area, all within the same county.

At this time there were two major political parties: the Republican Party and the Democratic Party.

== Elections ==
The 1871 New York state election was held on November 7. All seven statewide elective offices up for election were carried by the Republicans. The approximate party strength at this election, as expressed by the vote for Secretary of State, was: Republicans 387,000 and Democrats 368,000.

== Sessions ==
The Legislature met for the regular session at the Old State Capitol in Albany on January 2, 1872; and adjourned on May 14.

Henry Smith (R) was elected Speaker with 95 votes against 26 for John C. Jacobs (D).

In his annual message to the Legislature, Gov. John T. Hoffman suggested that a bi-partisan Constitutional Commission of 32 members should be formed. The Commission had four members from each judicial district, appointed by the Governor, and confirmed by the State Senate, equally divided between Democrats and Republicans.

William B. Woodin (R) was elected President pro tempore of the State Senate.

On May 1, Supreme Court Justice Albert Cardozo tendered his resignation, just before the report of the Judiciary Committee of the Assembly, which proposed his impeachment, was read. No further action was taken against Cardozo.

On May 2, the Assembly impeached Supreme Court Justice George G. Barnard.

On May 23, the Senate set the opening of the trial of Judge John McCunn, of the New York City Marine Court, for June 18.

On June 18, the Senate met for the trials of Judge McCunn, and Chenango County Judge Horace G. Prindle.

On July 2, the Senate removed Judge McCunn from office.

On July 17, the New York Court for the Trial of Impeachments met at Saratoga Springs to open the trial of Justice Barnard.

On August 19, Barnard was convicted by the Impeachment Court, was removed from office, and barred from ever holding public office again.

On December 4, the Constitutional Commission met.

== State Senate ==
=== Districts ===
- 1st District: Queens, Richmond and Suffolk counties
- 2nd District: 1st, 2nd, 3rd, 4th, 5th, 7th, 11th, 13th, 15th, 19th and 20th wards of the City of Brooklyn
- 3rd District: 6th, 8th, 9th, 10th, 12th, 14th, 16th, 17th and 18th wards of the City of Brooklyn; and all towns in Kings County
- 4th District: 1st, 2nd, 3rd, 4th, 5th, 6th, 7th, 13th and 14th wards of New York City
- 5th District: 8th, 9th, 15th and 16th wards of New York City
- 6th District: 10th, 11th and 17th wards of New York City
- 7th District: 18th, 20th and 21st wards of New York City
- 8th District: 12th, 19th and 22nd wards of New York City
- 9th District: Putnam, Rockland and Westchester counties
- 10th District: Orange and Sullivan counties
- 11th District: Columbia and Dutchess counties
- 12th District: Rensselaer and Washington counties
- 13th District: Albany County
- 14th District: Greene and Ulster counties
- 15th District: Fulton, Hamilton, Montgomery, Saratoga and Schenectady counties
- 16th District: Clinton, Essex and Warren counties
- 17th District: Franklin and St. Lawrence counties
- 18th District: Jefferson and Lewis counties
- 19th District: Oneida County
- 20th District: Herkimer and Otsego counties
- 21st District: Madison and Oswego counties
- 22nd District: Onondaga and Cortland counties
- 23rd District: Chenango, Delaware and Schoharie counties
- 24th District: Broome, Tompkins and Tioga counties
- 25th District: Cayuga and Wayne counties
- 26th District: Ontario, Seneca and Yates counties
- 27th District: Chemung, Schuyler and Steuben counties
- 28th District: Monroe County
- 29th District: Genesee, Niagara and Orleans counties
- 30th District: Allegany, Livingston and Wyoming counties
- 31st District: Erie County
- 32nd District: Cattaraugus and Chautauqua counties
Note: There are now 62 counties in the State of New York. The counties which are not mentioned in this list had not yet been established, or sufficiently organized, the area being included in one or more of the abovementioned counties.

=== Members ===
The asterisk (*) denotes members of the previous Legislature who continued in office as members of this Legislature. Isaac V. Baker Jr., Webster Wagner and James H. Graham changed from the Assembly to the Senate.

District	Senator	Party	Notes
1st	Townsend D. Cock	Democrat	
2nd	John C. Perry	Republican	
3rd	Henry C. Murphy*	Democrat	re-elected
4th	(William M. Tweed)*	Democrat	re-elected; did not take his seat; unsuccessfully contested by Jeremiah O'Donovan Rossa
5th	Erastus C. Benedict	Republican	
6th	Augustus Weismann	Republican	
7th	James O'Brien	Reform Democrat	
8th	Daniel F. Tiemann	Reform Democrat	
9th	William H. Robertson	Republican	
10th	Edward M. Madden	Republican	
11th	Abiah W. Palmer	Republican	
12th	Isaac V. Baker Jr.*	Republican	
13th	Charles H. Adams	Republican	
14th	Jacob Hardenbergh*	Democrat	re-elected; died on April 29, 1872
14th	William F. Scoresby	Lib. Rep./Dem.	elected to fill vacancy; seated on November 22
15th	Webster Wagner*	Republican	
16th	Samuel Ames	Republican	
17th	Wells S. Dickinson	Republican	
18th	Norris Winslow*	Republican	re-elected
19th	Samuel S. Lowery	Republican	
20th	Archibald C. McGowan	Republican	
21st	William Foster	Republican	
22nd	Daniel P. Wood	Republican	
23rd	James H. Graham*	Republican	
24th	Thomas I. Chatfield	Republican	
25th	William B. Woodin*	Republican	re-elected
26th	William Johnson	Democrat	
27th	Gabriel T. Harrower	Republican	
28th	Jarvis Lord*	Democrat	re-elected
29th	George Bowen*	Republican	re-elected
30th	James Wood*	Republican	re-elected
31st	Loran L. Lewis*	Republican	re-elected
32nd	Norman M. Allen	Republican	

=== Employees ===
- Clerk: James Terwilliger, resigned February 14
  - Charles R. Dayton, from February 17
- Sergeant-at-Arms: Edwin J. Loomis
- Doorkeeper: Daniel K. Schram
- Assistant Doorkeeper: J. D. Lonergan
- Journal Clerk: Charles R. Dayton, until February 17

== State Assembly ==
=== Assemblymen ===
The asterisk (*) denotes members of the previous Legislature who continued as members of this Legislature.

Party affiliations follow the vote for Speaker.

District		Assemblymen	Party	Notes
Albany	1st	Stephen Springsted	Republican	
Albany	2nd	Henry Smith	Republican	elected Speaker
Albany	3rd	Daniel L. Babcock	Republican	
Albany	4th	George B. Mosher	Democrat	
Allegany		William W. Crandall	Republican	
Broome		William M. Ely*	Republican	died on February 6, 1872
Broome		William L. Ford	Republican	elected to fill vacancy on March 5, 1872
Cattaraugus	1st	Commodore P. Vedder	Republican	
Cattaraugus	2nd	Enoch Holdridge	Republican	
Cayuga	1st	Ira D. Brown	Republican	
Cayuga	2nd	Elijah E. Brown	Republican	
Chautauqua	1st	Matthew P. Bemus*	Republican	
Chautauqua	2nd	Jerome Preston	Republican	
Chemung		David B. Hill*	Democrat	
Chenango		Andrew Shepardson*	Republican	
Clinton		Edmund Kingsland 2d	Republican	
Columbia	1st	Benjamin Ray*	Democrat	
Columbia	2nd	Milton M. Tompkins	Democrat	
Cortland		Dan C. Squires	Republican	
Delaware	1st	William Lewis Jr.	Republican	
Delaware	2nd	Matthew Griffin	Republican	
Dutchess	1st	Edward M. Goring	Republican	
Dutchess	2nd	Harvey G. Eastman	Republican	also Mayor of Poughkeepsie
Erie	1st	George Chambers*	Democrat	
Erie	2nd	George Baltz	Republican	
Erie	3rd	Franklin A. Alberger*	Republican	
Erie	4th	John Simson	Republican	
Erie	5th	John M. Wiley*	Democrat	
Essex		Franklin W. Tobey	Republican	
Franklin		James H. Pierce*	Republican	
Fulton and Hamilton		Samuel W. Buel	Democrat	
Genesee		Volney G. Knapp*	Republican	
Greene		Augustus Hill	Democrat	
Herkimer		Eleazer C. Rice	Republican	
Jefferson	1st	Oliver C. Wyman*	Republican	
Jefferson	2nd	William W. Enos	Republican	
Kings	1st	David C. Aitken*	Democrat	
Kings	2nd	Edward D. White	Republican	
Kings	3rd	Dominick H. Roche*	Democrat	
Kings	4th	William W. Moseley*	Democrat	
Kings	5th	Eugene D. Berri	Republican	
Kings	6th	Peter G. Peck	Republican	died on March 29, 1872 in Brooklyn
Kings	7th	Charles B. Morton	Republican	
Kings	8th	George C. Bennett	Republican	
Kings	9th	John C. Jacobs*	Democrat	
Lewis		Amos V. Smiley	Republican	
Livingston		Archibald Kennedy	Republican	
Madison	1st	John W. Lippitt	Republican	
Madison	2nd	Francis A. Hyatt	Republican	
Monroe	1st	George A. Goss	Republican	
Monroe	2nd	George D. Lord*	Democrat	
Monroe	3rd	Leonard Burritt	Republican	
Montgomery		William J. Van Dusen	Republican	
New York	1st	James Healey	Democrat	
New York	2nd	James Dunphy	Democrat	contested by Henry G. Leash
New York	3rd	James Hayes	Democrat	
New York	4th	John J. Blair*	Democrat	contested by William McMahon
New York	5th	David S. Paige	Reform Democrat	
New York	6th	Timothy J. Campbell*	Democrat	
New York	7th	Horatio N. Twombly	Republican	
New York	8th	Conrad Geib	Republican	
New York	9th	Stephen Pell	Republican	
New York	10th	Henry H. Haight	Reform Democrat	
New York	11th	Rush C. Hawkins	Republican	
New York	12th	William W. Cook*	Democrat	
New York	13th	George H. Mackay	Republican	
New York	14th	John A. Foley	Reform Democrat	
New York	15th	Alexander Frear*	Democrat	contested; seat vacated on March 1
New York	15th	Frederick Kilian	Republican	seated on March 1
New York	16th	Nicholas Haughton	Democrat	
New York	17th	Charles A. Flammer	Republican	
New York	18th	Samuel J. Tilden	Reform Democrat	
New York	19th	Thomas C. Fields*	Democrat	unsuccessfully contested
New York	20th	Severn D. Moulton	Republican	
New York	21st	William A. Whitbeck	Republican	
Niagara	1st	Isaac H. Babcock	Republican	
Niagara	2nd	George M. Swain	Republican	
Oneida	1st	Martin L. Hungerford	Republican	
Oneida	2nd	Eleazer Beckwith	Republican	
Oneida	3rd	George K. Carroll	Democrat	
Oneida	4th	Albert L. Hayes	Republican	
Onondaga	1st	Thomas G. Alvord*	Republican	
Onondaga	2nd	Peter Burns*	Republican	
Onondaga	3rd	Gustavus Sniper*	Republican	
Ontario	1st	Ambrose L. Van Dusen	Republican	
Ontario	2nd	Cyrillo S. Lincoln	Republican	
Orange	1st	Robert H. Strahan*	Republican	
Orange	2nd	Frank Abbott	Republican	
Orleans		E. Kirke Hart	Republican	
Oswego	1st	Daniel G. Fort	Republican	
Oswego	2nd	Thomas W. Green	Republican	
Oswego	3rd	Chauncey S. Sage*	Republican	
Otsego	1st	Alfred Chamberlain*	Democrat	
Otsego	2nd	J. Lee Tucker*	Republican	
Putnam		James B. Dykeman	Republican	
Queens	1st	L. Bradford Prince*	Republican	
Queens	2nd	James M. Oakley*	Democrat	
Rensselaer	1st	Jason C. Osgood	Republican	
Rensselaer	2nd	John L. Snyder	Republican	
Rensselaer	3rd	Castle W. Herrick	Republican	
Richmond		David W. Judd	Republican	
Rockland		Daniel Tompkins	Republican	
St. Lawrence	1st	Darius A. Moore	Republican	
St. Lawrence	2nd	Dolphus S. Lynde*	Republican	
St. Lawrence	3rd	Parker W. Rose	Republican	
Saratoga	1st	George West	Republican	
Saratoga	2nd	Nathaniel M. Houghton	Republican	
Schenectady		William Greenhalgh	Republican	
Schoharie		Peter Couchman	Democrat	
Schuyler		Harmon L. Gregory	Republican	
Seneca		Peter Lott	Republican	
Steuben	1st	Thomas M. Fowler	Republican	
Steuben	2nd	James B. Murdock	Republican	
Suffolk		John S. Marcy	Republican	
Sullivan		Frank Buckley*	Democrat	
Tioga		William Smyth	Republican	
Tompkins		Anson W. Knettles	Republican	
Ulster	1st	Robert Loughran	Republican	
Ulster	2nd	C. Meech Woolsey*	Republican	
Ulster	3rd	Allen A. Whitaker	Republican	
Warren		Joseph Woodward	Republican	
Washington	1st	Edmund W. Hollister	Republican	
Washington	2nd	George W. L. Smith	Republican	
Wayne	1st	Edward B. Wells	Republican	
Wayne	2nd	Lucien T. Yeomans	Republican	
Westchester	1st	William W. Niles	Republican	
Westchester	2nd	Albert Badeau	Republican	
Westchester	3rd	James W. Husted*	Republican	
Wyoming		John N. Davidson	Republican	
Yates		George P. Lord*	Republican	

=== Employees ===
- Clerk: Cornelius S. Underwood, died on April 27, 1872
  - Edward M. Johnson, from May 1, 1872
- Sergeant-at-Arms: Philip J. Rhinehardt
- Doorkeeper: Eugene L. Demers
- First Assistant Doorkeeper: James H. Lee
- Second Assistant Doorkeeper: James Hogan

== Sources ==
- Civil List and Constitutional History of the Colony and State of New York compiled by Edgar Albert Werner (1884; see pg. 276 for Senate districts; pg. 290 for senators; pg. 298–304 for Assembly districts; and pg. 372f for assemblymen)
- Journal of the Assembly (95th Session) (1872, Vol. I, January 2 to April 9, 1872)
- Journal of the Assembly (95th Session) (1872, Vol. II, April 9 to May 14, 1872)
- Senators Elected and Assemblymen Elected in Corning Journal on November 16, 1871
- THE ASSEMBLY in NYT on December 1, 1871
- THE REFORM LEGISLATURE in NYT on January 3, 1872
