= Senator Ames =

Senator Ames may refer to:

- Adelbert Ames (1835–1933), U.S. Senator from Mississippi from 1870 to 1874
- Alfred Elisha Ames (1814–1874), Illinois State Senate
- Alfred K. Ames (1866–1950), Maine State Senate
- Benjamin Ames (1778–1835), Maine State Senate
- Cheney Ames (1808–1892), New York State Senate
- DeHart H. Ames (1872–1955), New York State Senate
- E. Almer Ames Jr. (1903–1987), Virginia State Senate
- Frederick Lothrop Ames (1835–1893), Massachusetts State Senate
- Oliver Ames (governor) (1831–1895), Massachusetts State Senate
- Oliver Ames Jr. (1807–1877), Utah State Senate
- Oliver Ames Sr. (1779–1863), Massachusetts State Senate
- Samuel Ames (1824–1875), New York State Senate
