= Canal Ring (New York) =

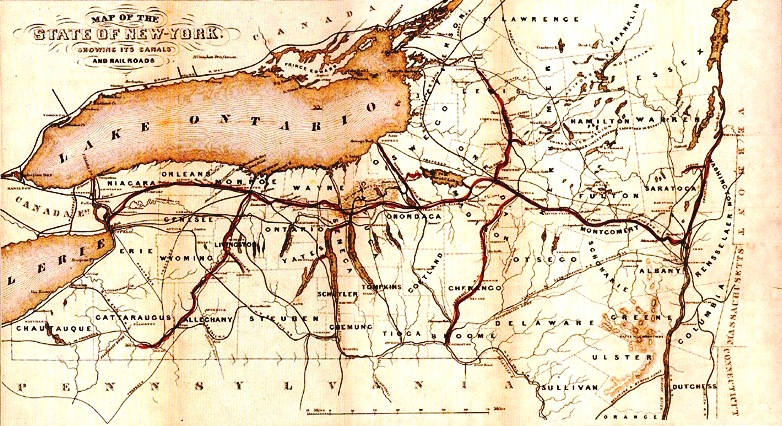
1853 map of New York canals emboldened, center: the Erie Canal; other lines: railroads, rivers and county borders

The Canal Ring was a group of corrupt contractors and their political supporters in the 1860s and 1870s who defrauded the state of New York by overcharging for repairs and improvement of the state's canal system. It consisted largely of a group of loosely organized Democratic and Republican Assemblymen and State Senators, led by Jarvis Lord in the Assembly and William Johnson in the Senate. The firm Belden & Denison made the most money from the scam, though numerous contractors were involved.

They were chiefly organized along the route of the Erie Canal; in Syracuse, Rochester, Buffalo, Lockport, and Oswego. Frauds peaked in 1872, with "Appropriations for Extraordinary Repairs" rising to $4.1 million.

Then Governor of New York Samuel J. Tilden began targeting the ring in 1874. In March 1875, he released a report detailing frauds carried out. This served as a direct appeal to the people, and so aroused public opinion that the legislature was forced to authorize the governor to appoint a canal commission. The reports of this commission resulted in a marked diminution in the appropriation for canals and the indictment of several officials for defrauding the state. His handling of the Ring is credited with helping Tilden secure the Democratic nomination for president in 1876.

== Background ==
The Erie Canal was first proposed in the 1780s, then re-proposed in 1807. A survey was authorized, funded, and executed in 1808. Proponents of the project gradually wore down opponents; its construction began in 1817, and opened on October 26, 1825. In a time when bulk goods were limited to pack animals (a 250-pound (113 kg) maximum), and there were no railways, water was the most cost-effective way to ship bulk goods. It was the first transportation system between the Eastern Seaboard and the western interior of the United States that did not require portage.

It was faster than carts pulled by draft animals and cut transport costs by about 95%. The canal gave New York City's port a large advantage over all other U.S. port cities and ushered in the state's 19th century political and cultural ascendancy. The canal fostered a population surge in western New York and opened regions farther west to settlement. Though the Erie Canal and associated feeders were highly successful for several years after opening, overbuilding and the Panic of 1837 marked the end of highly profitable years. Increased competition from railroads and other canals further contributed to decline in profits. In 1851, contracts under the $9 Million Act were divided among Democratic and Whig contractors. In 1854, a board of three commissioners was established to award contracts for the maintenance and repair of the canal.

More competition forced the canal to lower rates, resulting in a decline in revenue. The canal saw a boom in prosperity with the outbreak of the American Civil War in 1861, which continued throughout the war and for a brief time after. After the Atlantic Cable was completed in 1866, however, the canal began to lose tonnage again. By 1869, railroads finally surpassed the canals in terms of tonnage, and the routes financial troubles were compounded by the Long Depression beginning in 1873. It registered a net loss of $265,610.70 in 1875.

== Canal Ring ==
The Canal Ring made money by charging low prices for major works, but extremely high ones for minor things, in what was termed an "unbalanced bid". Under the system, contractors could also not complete all of the work they agreed to in a contract without punishment. In 1862, the enlargement of the canal was deemed finished in an effort to curb corruption, but new improvements were soon necessitated by the increased traffic due to the Civil War.

Many New Yorkers felt corruption was a major cause of the canal system's troubles. In 1867 at the state Constitutional Convention, Erastus Brooks alleged canal contracts of being awarded to the highest bidder. A commission was established, consisting of James Gibson, Henry C. Murphy, Charles Stanford, William Bristol, William S. Clark, George W. Millspaugh, and counsel Henry Smith. It concluded there were "gross and monstrous frauds", and the Canal Commissioner, Robert C. Dorn, was impeached.
