= Jacob B. Carpenter =

American politician

Jacob Bockee Carpenter (July 16, 1826 – April 9, 1894) was an American politician from New York.

== Life ==
Carpenter was born on July 16, 1826, in the family homestead in Stanford, New York. He was the son of Morgan Carpenter and Maria Bockee. Maria was the daughter of assemblyman Jacob Bockee. He graduated from Union College in 1846, the same graduating class as Henry R. Pierson and John T. Hoffman. His brother was B. Platt Carpenter.

In 1855, Carpenter was elected town supervisor of Stanford as a Whig. Later that year, he was elected to the New York State Assembly as a Republican, representing the Dutchess County 3rd District. He served in the Assembly in 1856. In the 1860 United States Presidential Election, he was a presidential elector for Abraham Lincoln and Hannibal Hamlin.

In 1864, Carpenter moved to Poughkeepsie. In 1872, he became a Liberal Republican and was re-elected to the New York State Assembly under a joint Liberal Republican-Democrat ticket for the Dutchess County 2nd District. He served in the Assembly in 1873. In 1870, he was elected town supervisor of Poughkeepsie, In 1875, he was elected mayor. He later became manager of Hudson River State Hospital. When the Poughkeepsie and Eastern Railroad became bankrupt, he was appointed receiver and managed the property while it was being reorganized. Afterwards, he moved to Millbrook.

In 1860, Carpenter married Sarah Elizabeth Thorn. Their two daughters were Mary Thorn Carpenter, author of A Girl's Winter in India and From Cairo to Jerusalem, and Maria Bockee Tower. He was a member of the Episcopal Church.

Carpenter died from heart failure on April 9, 1894, in Millbrook. He was buried in Poughkeepsie Rural Cemetery.

New York State Assembly
Preceded by Ambrose Wager	New York State Assembly; Dutchess County, 3rd District; 1856	Succeeded by Cornelius N. Campbell
Preceded by Harvey G. Eastman	New York State Assembly; Dutchess County, 2nd District; 1873	Succeeded by Harvey G. Eastman
