= Henry Pierson =

Henry Pierson may refer to:

- Henry Hugh Pierson (1815–1873), English composer
- Henry R. Pierson (1819–1890), American lawyer and politician
