= 96th New York State Legislature =

New York state legislative session

←	95th	97th	→
- The Old State Capitol (1879)

Overview
- Legislative body: New York State Legislature
- Jurisdiction: New York, United States
- Term: January 1 – December 31, 1873

Senate
- Members: 32
- President: Lt. Gov. John C. Robinson (R)
- Temporary President: William B. Woodin (R)
- Party control: Republican (21-4-4-2)

Assembly
- Members: 128
- Speaker: Alonzo B. Cornell (R)
- Party control: Republican (92-34-2)

Sessions
- 1st: January 7 – May 30, 1873

The 96th New York State Legislature, consisting of the New York State Senate and the New York State Assembly, met from January 7 to May 30, 1873, during the first year of John A. Dix's governorship, in Albany.

== Background ==
Under the provisions of the New York Constitution of 1846, 32 Senators and 128 assemblymen were elected in single-seat districts; senators for a two-year term, assemblymen for a one-year term. The senatorial districts were made up of entire counties, except New York County (five districts) and Kings County (two districts). The Assembly districts were made up of entire towns, or city wards, forming a contiguous area, all within the same county.

In his annual message to the 95th Legislature, Gov. John T. Hoffman suggested that a bi-partisan Constitutional Commission of 32 members should be formed. The commission had four members from each judicial district, appointed by the Governor, and confirmed by the State Senate, equally divided between Democrats and Republicans. The Constitutional Commission met on December 4, 1872.

At this time there were two major political parties: the Republican Party and the Democratic Party. A faction of the Republican Party assumed the name of Liberal Republican Party and nominated a fusion ticket with the Democrats, supporting Horace Greeley for president. The Democratic/Liberal Republican state ticket had Francis Kernan (D) for Governor and Chauncey M. Depew (LR) for Lieutenant Governor.

== Elections ==
The 1872 New York state election was held on November 5. Republicans John A. Dix and John C. Robinson were elected Governor and Lieutenant Governor. The other three statewide elective offices up for election were also carried by the Republicans. The approximate party strength at this election, as expressed by the vote for Governor, was: Republicans 446,000 and Democrats/Liberal Republicans 392,000.

== Sessions ==
The Legislature met for the regular session at the Old State Capitol in Albany on January 7, 1873; and adjourned on May 30.

Alonzo B. Cornell (R) was elected Speaker with 91 votes against 35 for John C. Jacobs (D).

William B. Woodin (R) was elected president pro tempore of the State Senate.

On January 21, the Legislature re-elected U.S. Senator Roscoe Conkling (R) to a second six-year term, beginning on March 4, 1873.

The Constitutional Commission adjourned sine die on March 15, 1873. The proposed amendments to the Constitution were then debated by the Legislature, and those approved were submitted to the voters for ratification at the next state elections. At the New York state election, 1873, the voters were asked if the Judges of the Court of Appeals, and the County Judges throughout the State, should be appointed instead of being elected, which was answered in the negative.

== State Senate ==
=== Districts ===
- 1st District: Queens, Richmond and Suffolk counties
- 2nd District: 1st, 2nd, 3rd, 4th, 5th, 7th, 11th, 13th, 15th, 19th and 20th wards of the City of Brooklyn
- 3rd District: 6th, 8th, 9th, 10th, 12th, 14th, 16th, 17th and 18th wards of the City of Brooklyn; and all towns in Kings County
- 4th District: 1st, 2nd, 3rd, 4th, 5th, 6th, 7th, 13th and 14th wards of New York City
- 5th District: 8th, 9th, 15th and 16th wards of New York City
- 6th District: 10th, 11th and 17th wards of New York City
- 7th District: 18th, 20th and 21st wards of New York City
- 8th District: 12th, 19th and 22nd wards of New York City
- 9th District: Putnam, Rockland and Westchester counties
- 10th District: Orange and Sullivan counties
- 11th District: Columbia and Dutchess counties
- 12th District: Rensselaer and Washington counties
- 13th District: Albany County
- 14th District: Greene and Ulster counties
- 15th District: Fulton, Hamilton, Montgomery, Saratoga and Schenectady counties
- 16th District: Clinton, Essex and Warren counties
- 17th District: Franklin and St. Lawrence counties
- 18th District: Jefferson and Lewis counties
- 19th District: Oneida County
- 20th District: Herkimer and Otsego counties
- 21st District: Madison and Oswego counties
- 22nd District: Onondaga and Cortland counties
- 23rd District: Chenango, Delaware and Schoharie counties
- 24th District: Broome, Tompkins and Tioga counties
- 25th District: Cayuga and Wayne counties
- 26th District: Ontario, Seneca and Yates counties
- 27th District: Chemung, Schuyler and Steuben counties
- 28th District: Monroe County
- 29th District: Genesee, Niagara and Orleans counties
- 30th District: Allegany, Livingston and Wyoming counties
- 31st District: Erie County
- 32nd District: Cattaraugus and Chautauqua counties
Note: There are now 62 counties in the State of New York. The counties which are not mentioned in this list had not yet been established, or sufficiently organized, the area being included in one or more of the abovementioned counties.

=== Members ===
The asterisk (*) denotes members of the previous Legislature who continued in office as members of this Legislature.

Note: Palmer, Harrower and Allen had been elected as Republicans in 1871, but had joined the Liberal Republicans in 1872, and were barred from the Republican caucus.

District	Senator	Party	Notes
1st	Townsend D. Cock*	Democrat	
2nd	John C. Perry*	Republican	
3rd	Henry C. Murphy*	Democrat	
4th	(William M. Tweed)*	Democrat	did not take his seat; unsuccessfully contested by Jeremiah O'Donovan Rossa
5th	Erastus C. Benedict*	Republican	
6th	Augustus Weismann*	Republican	
7th	James O'Brien*	Reform Democrat	
8th	Daniel F. Tiemann*	Reform Democrat	
9th	William H. Robertson*	Republican	
10th	Edward M. Madden*	Republican	
11th	Abiah W. Palmer*	Liberal Rep.	voted for Conkling as U.S. Senator
12th	Isaac V. Baker Jr.*	Republican	
13th	Charles H. Adams*	Republican	
14th	William F. Scoresby*	Lib. Rep./Dem.	
15th	Webster Wagner*	Republican	
16th	Samuel Ames*	Republican	
17th	Wells S. Dickinson*	Republican	
18th	Norris Winslow*	Republican	
19th	Samuel S. Lowery*	Republican	
20th	Archibald C. McGowan*	Republican	
21st	William Foster*	Republican	
22nd	Daniel P. Wood*	Republican	
23rd	James H. Graham*	Republican	
24th	Thomas I. Chatfield*	Republican	
25th	William B. Woodin*	Republican	elected President pro tempore
26th	William Johnson*	Democrat	
27th	Gabriel T. Harrower*	Liberal Rep.	voted for Henry R. Selden as U.S. Senator
28th	Jarvis Lord*	Democrat	
29th	George Bowen*	Republican	
30th	James Wood*	Republican	
31st	Loran L. Lewis*	Republican	
32nd	Norman M. Allen*	Liberal Rep.	voted for William M. Evarts as U.S. Senator

=== Employees ===
- Clerk: Charles R. Dayton
- Assistant Doorkeeper: James Franklyn Jr.
- Stenographer: H. C. Tanner

== State Assembly ==
=== Assemblymen ===
The asterisk (*) denotes members of the previous Legislature who continued as members of this Legislature.

District		Assemblymen	Party	Notes
Albany	1st	Peter Schoonmaker	Republican	
Albany	2nd	Henry R. Pierson	Republican	
Albany	3rd	John W. Van Valkenburgh	Democrat	
Albany	4th	George B. Mosher*	Democrat	
Allegany		William W. Crandall*	Republican	
Broome		William L. Ford*	Republican	
Cattaraugus	1st	Commodore P. Vedder*	Republican	
Cattaraugus	2nd	John Manley	Republican	
Cayuga	1st	Leonard F. Hardy	Republican	
Cayuga	2nd	Elijah E. Brown*	Republican	
Chautauqua	1st	Francis B. Brewer	Republican	
Chautauqua	2nd	John D. Hiller	Republican	
Chemung		Seymour Dexter	Republican	
Chenango		Russell A. Young	Republican	
Clinton		Smith M. Weed	Democrat	
Columbia	1st	Benjamin Ray*	Democrat	
Columbia	2nd	Milton M. Tompkins*	Democrat	
Cortland		George W. Phillips	Republican	
Delaware	1st	William Lewis Jr.*	Republican	
Delaware	2nd	Matthew Griffin*	Republican	
Dutchess	1st	James Mackin	Democrat	
Dutchess	2nd	Jacob B. Carpenter	Democrat	
Erie	1st	John O'Brien	Republican	
Erie	2nd	George Baltz*	Republican	
Erie	3rd	Franklin A. Alberger*	Republican	
Erie	4th	John Nice	Republican	
Erie	5th	Robert B. Foote	Republican	
Essex		Franklin W. Tobey*	Republican	
Franklin		John P. Badger	Republican	
Fulton and Hamilton		Willard J. Heacock	Republican	
Genesee		Elbert Townsend	Republican	
Greene		Augustus Hill*	Democrat	
Herkimer		Eleazer C. Rice*	Republican	
Jefferson	1st	Elam Persons	Republican	
Jefferson	2nd	Horatio S. Hendee	Republican	
Kings	1st	James F. Donahue	Democrat	
Kings	2nd	David C. Van Cott	Republican	
Kings	3rd	Dominick H. Roche*	Democrat	
Kings	4th	James Watt	Republican	
Kings	5th	Albion P. Higgins	Republican	
Kings	6th	Jacob Worth	Republican	
Kings	7th	Frederick Cocheu	Republican	
Kings	8th	Adrian M. Suydam	Republican	
Kings	9th	John C. Jacobs*	Democrat	
Lewis		Sidney Sylvester	Republican	
Livingston		Archibald Kennedy*	Republican	
Madison	1st	Edward C. Philpot	Republican	
Madison	2nd	Joseph F. Crawford	Republican	
Monroe	1st	George A. Goss*	Republican	
Monroe	2nd	Henry L. Fish	Independent	voted for Cornell as Speaker
Monroe	3rd	Leonard Burritt*	Republican	
Montgomery		William J. Van Dusen*	Republican	
New York	1st	James Healey*	Democrat	
New York	2nd	Dennis Burns	Democrat	
New York	3rd	James Hayes*	Democrat	
New York	4th	James Ryan	Democrat	
New York	5th	Michael Norton	Democrat	
New York	6th	Timothy J. Campbell*	Democrat	
New York	7th	George W. Clarke	Republican	
New York	8th	Solon B. Smith	Republican	
New York	9th	Stephen Pell*	Republican	
New York	10th	Jacob M. Patterson	Republican	
New York	11th	Alonzo B. Cornell	Republican	elected Speaker
New York	12th	William W. Cook*	Democrat	
New York	13th	Charles Blackie	Republican	
New York	14th	Charles G. Cornell	Democrat	
New York	15th	Joseph Blumenthal	Democrat	
New York	16th	Peter Woods	Democrat	
New York	17th	Andrew Blessing	Democrat	
New York	18th	Bernard Biglin	Republican	
New York	19th	James A. Deering	Democrat	
New York	20th	William S. Opdyke	Republican	
New York	21st	Charles Crary	Democrat	
Niagara	1st	Isaac H. Babcock*	Republican	
Niagara	2nd	George M. Swain*	Republican	
Oneida	1st	Nicholas A. White	Republican	
Oneida	2nd	Henry J. Coggeshall	Republican	
Oneida	3rd	Patrick H. Costello	Republican	
Oneida	4th	Daniel Walker	Republican	
Onondaga	1st	William H. H. Gere	Republican	
Onondaga	2nd	George Raynor	Republican	
Onondaga	3rd	John I. Furbeck	Republican	
Ontario	1st	Ambrose L. Van Dusen*	Republican	
Ontario	2nd	Cyrillo S. Lincoln*	Republican	
Orange	1st	Augustus Denniston	Republican	
Orange	2nd	Frank Abbott*	Dem./Lib. Rep.	
Orleans		Elisha S. Whalen	Republican	
Oswego	1st	Daniel G. Fort*	Republican	
Oswego	2nd	Willard Johnson	Democrat	
Oswego	3rd	J. Lyman Bulkley	Republican	
Otsego	1st	James Stewart	Democrat	
Otsego	2nd	John Cope	Republican	
Putnam		William S. Clapp	Independent	voted for Cornell as Speaker
Queens	1st	L. Bradford Prince*	Republican	
Queens	2nd	James M. Oakley*	Democrat	contested by Theodore J. Cogswell
Rensselaer	1st	William V. Cleary	Democrat	
Rensselaer	2nd	John L. Snyder*	Republican	
Rensselaer	3rd	Castle W. Herrick*	Republican	
Richmond		John Blake Hillyer	Republican	
Rockland		William Voorhis	Republican	
St. Lawrence	1st	Darius A. Moore*	Republican	
St. Lawrence	2nd	Dolphus S. Lynde*	Republican	
St. Lawrence	3rd	Parker W. Rose*	Republican	
Saratoga	1st	George West*	Republican	
Saratoga	2nd	George S. Batcheller	Republican	
Schenectady		Daniel P. McQueen	Republican	
Schoharie		Peter Couchman*	Democrat	
Schuyler		Jeremiah McGuire	Democrat	
Seneca		William W. Van Demark	Democrat	
Steuben	1st	Thomas M. Fowler*	Republican	
Steuben	2nd	Stephen F. Gilbert	Republican	
Suffolk		John S. Marcy*	Republican	
Sullivan		George M. Beebe	Democrat	
Tioga		Jerome B. Landfield	Republican	
Tompkins		Anson W. Knettles*	Republican	
Ulster	1st	Michael A. Cummings	Democrat	
Ulster	2nd	James H. Brown	Republican	
Ulster	3rd	Daniel D. Elting	Republican	
Warren		James G. Porteous	Republican	
Washington	1st	Edmund W. Hollister*	Republican	
Washington	2nd	Eleazer Jones	Republican	died on February 10, 1873
Washington	2nd	William H. Tefft	Republican	elected to fill vacancy on March 18, 1873 (took seat on March 19th)
Wayne	1st	Edward B. Wells*	Republican	
Wayne	2nd	Lucien T. Yeomans*	Republican	
Westchester	1st	William Herring	Republican	
Westchester	2nd	Amherst Wight Jr.	Republican	
Westchester	3rd	James W. Husted*	Republican	
Wyoming		John N. Davidson*	Republican	
Yates		Morris B. Flinn	Republican	

=== Employees ===
- Clerk: John O'Donnell
- Assistant Clerk: Samuel P. Allen
- Sergeant-at-Arms: Edward M. Goring
- Doorkeeper: Eugene L. Demers
- Journal Clerk: Edward M. Johnson

== Sources ==
- Civil List and Constitutional History of the Colony and State of New York compiled by Edgar Albert Werner (1884; see pg. 276 for Senate districts; pg. 290 for senators; pg. 298–304 for Assembly districts; and pg. 373f for assemblymen)
- Life Sketches of Executive Officers and Members of the Legislature of the State of New York by William H. McElroy & Alexander McBride (1873)
- THE ASSEMBLY in NYT on November 7, 1872
- ALBANY; Organization of Both Houses of the Legislature in NYT on January 8, 1873
