= George Bowen (New York politician) =

American politician

George Bowen (September 28, 1831 – January 22, 1921) was an American lawyer and politician from New York.

== Early life and education ==
Bowen was born in Shelby, New York, the son of Abiel Bowen MD and Anna (Cone) Bowen. He attended the common schools, Millville Academy. He graduated from the Cary Collegiate Institute in 1848.

He studied law in Batavia Town with John H. Martindale and Seth Wakeman and was admitted to the New York Bar in 1852. He practiced law in Batavia.

== Career ==
Early in his political career, Bowen was elected both village and town clerk of Batavia. He was district attorney of Genesee County from 1857 to 1859, postmaster of Batavia from 1862 to 1866, and a member of the New York State Senate (29th D.), sitting in the 93rd, 94th, 95th and 96th New York State Legislatures. He served two terms, from 1870 to 1873.

== Personal life ==
On December 17, 1856, he married Emerette A. Walker (1831–1918). He was buried at the Grand View Cemetery in Batavia.

New York State Senate
Preceded by Richard Crowley	New York State Senate; 29th District; 1870–1873	Succeeded by Dan H. Cole
