= James M. Oakley =

American politician

Member of the New York State Assembly
- In office 1871–1875

Member of the New York State Senate
- In office 1878–1879

Personal details
- Born: June 19, 1839 New York City, U.S.
- Died: March 25, 1887 (aged 47) Jamaica, Queens County, New York, U.S.
- Resting place: Prospect Cemetery, Queens
- Party: Democratic
- Occupation: Real estate businessman; politician

James M. Oakley (June 19, 1839 in New York City – March 25, 1887 in Jamaica, Queens County, New York) was an American politician from New York.

== Life ==
He attended the public schools, and then engaged in the real estate business.

He was a member of the New York State Assembly (Queens Co., 2nd D.) in 1871, 1872, 1873, 1874 and 1875.

He was a delegate to the 1872 and 1876 Democratic National Conventions. In 1877, he was appointed by Gov. Lucius Robinson as Commissioner of Quarantine.

He was a member of the New York State Senate (1st D.) in 1878 and 1879.

He was President of the New York, Woodhaven and Rockaway Railroad from 1881 until his death.

He died at his home in Jamaica, Queens, on March 25, 1887, of "paralysis of the heart," and was buried at the Prospect Cemetery in Queens.

== Sources ==
- Civil List and Constitutional History of the Colony and State of New York compiled by Edgar Albert Werner (1884; pg. 290 and 372ff)
- The State Government for 1879 by Charles G. Shanks (Weed, Parsons & Co, Albany NY, 1879; pg. 47)
- OBITUARY NOTES; Ex-State Senator James M. Oakley died... in NYT on March 26, 1887
- EX-SENATOR OAKLEY'S FUNERAL in NYT on March 29, 1887

New York State Assembly
Preceded by Francis B. Baldwin	New York State Assembly; Queens County, 2nd District; 1871–1875	Succeeded by Alvan T. Payne
New York State Assembly
Preceded by L. Bradford Prince	New York State Senate; 1st District; 1878–1879	Succeeded by John Birdsall
