= A. Bleecker Banks =

American book publisher and politician

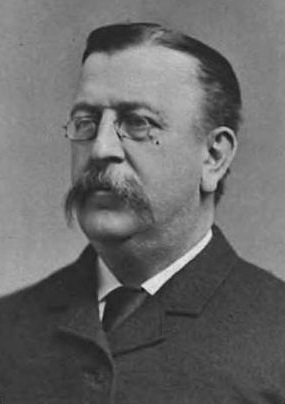
A. Bleecker Banks

Anthony Bleecker Banks (March 7, 1835 – August 6, 1910) was an American book publisher and politician from New York.

== Life ==
Banks was born on March 7, 1835, in New York City, the son of David Banks (born 1786), a law book publisher, and Harriet Brenecke (Lloyd) Banks. He graduated from Columbia College. Then he learned the printing and publishing trade, and in 1857 took over the management of the Albany branch of his father's publishing house.

He was a member of the New York State Assembly (Albany County, 3rd D.) in 1862. On July 6, 1866, he married Phoebe Wells (born 1837), and they had two children.

He was a member of the New York State Senate (13th D.) from 1868 to 1871, sitting in the 91st, 92nd, 93rd and 94th New York State Legislatures.

He was Mayor of Albany from 1876 to 1878, and from 1884 to 1886.

He was found guilty of violating the fish and game laws by taking partridge and quail when they were out of season. In January 1908, the New York Supreme Court, Appellate Division upheld the verdict, and Banks had to pay $648.76 in damages and costs.

He died on August 6, 1910, at his summer residence in Bar Harbor, Hancock County, Maine; and was buried at the Green-Wood Cemetery in Brooklyn.

== Sources ==
- The New York Civil List compiled by Franklin Benjamin Hough, Stephen C. Hutchins and Edgar Albert Werner (1870; pg. 444 and 495)
- Life Sketches of the State Officers, Senators, and Members of the Assembly of the State of New York in 1868 by S. R. Harlow & S. C. Hutchins (pg. 59f)
- GAME CONVICTION AFFIRMED in NYT on January 9, 1908
- Anthony Bleecker Banks in NYT on August 8, 1910
- Banks genealogy at RootsWeb
- "Green-Wood Cemetery". Burial Search. 2014.

New York State Assembly
Preceded by Henry Lansing	New York State Assembly; Albany County, 3rd District; 1862	Succeeded by Henry L. Wait
New York State Senate
Preceded by Lorenzo D. Collins	New York State Senate; 13th District; 1868–1871	Succeeded by Charles H. Adams
Political offices
Preceded by Edmund L. Judson	Mayor of Albany, New York; 1876–1878	Succeeded by Michael N. Nolan
Preceded by John Swinburne	Mayor of Albany, New York; 1884–1886	Succeeded by John Boyd Thacher
