= Jarvis Lord =

American politician

- Born: February 10, 1816; Ballston, New York
- Died: July 24, 1887 (aged 71); Pittsford (town), New York
- Occupation: American politician

Jarvis Lord (February 10, 1816, in Ballston, Saratoga County, New York – July 24, 1887, in Pittsford, Monroe County, New York), was an American politician from New York.

== Life ==
He was the son of Daniel Lord (1780–1818) and Clarissa (Seeley) Lord (1783–1867). He attended the common schools, and became a farmer. He married Eliza Ann Decker (1819–1854), and they had three children, among them Assemblyman George D. Lord. About 1842, he removed to a farm in Pittsford. He also became a contractor, engaging in canal construction, and was president of the Bank of Monroe of Rochester. On March 20, 1855, he married Zilpha M. Tibbets (1835–1911).

He was a member of the New York State Assembly (Monroe Co., 1st D.) in 1858. At the state elections in 1861 and 1864, he ran on the Democratic ticket for Canal Commissioner, but was defeated both times by Republican Franklin A. Alberger.

In 1872, Lord had a lake freighter named after him.

He was again a member of the State Assembly in 1867, and was the Democratic minority's candidate for Speaker. He was a member of the New York State Senate (28th D.) from 1870 to 1875, sitting in the 93rd, 94th, 95th, 96th, 97th and 98th New York State Legislatures. In 1876–77, he was accused in connection with the Canal Ring frauds, and became a defendant in a series of trials.

He was buried at the Pittsford Cemetery.

== Sources ==
- The New York Civil List compiled by Franklin Benjamin Hough, Stephen C. Hutchins and Edgar Albert Werner (1870; pg. 444, 487 and 506)
- Life Sketches of Executive Officers, and Members of the Legislature of the State of New York, Vol. III by H. H. Boone & Theodore P. Cook (1870; pg. 96f)
- Lord genealogy at RootsWeb
- WAR ON THE CANAL RING in NYT on March 26, 1875
- THE TRIAL OF JARVIS LORD in NYT on December 6, 1876

New York State Assembly
Preceded by Jeremiah S. Baker	New York State Assembly; Monroe County, 1st District; 1858	Succeeded by Harrison A. Lyon
Preceded by Fairchild Andrus	New York State Assembly; Monroe County, 1st District; 1867	Succeeded by John Martin Davis
New York State Senate
Preceded by Lewis H. Morgan	New York State Senate; 28th District; 1870–1875	Succeeded by William N. Emerson
