= Christopher F. Norton =

American politician

- Born: July 21, 1821; Fredonia, Chautauqua County, New York
- Died: May 6, 1880 (aged 58); Perry Park, Douglas County, Colorado
- Occupation: American politician
- Spouse: Sarah Chase

Christopher Frazine Norton (July 21, 1821 in Fredonia, Chautauqua County, New York – May 6, 1880 in Perry Park, Douglas County, Colorado) was an American politician from New York.

== Life ==
He was the son of James Norton and Polly (Webster) Norton. He attended the district schools and Fredonia Academy. Then he became a clerk in a store. On December 25, 1843, he married Sarah Chase (1821–1870), and they had several children. In 1845, he removed to Erie, Pennsylvania, and engaged in the lumber business. In 1856, he sold his business and removed to Plattsburgh, New York. There he set up a business, getting lumber from the Saranac lakes area, and have it floated down the Saranac River.

He was a member of the New York State Senate (16th D.) in 1870 and 1871.

He was buried at the Riverside Cemetery in Plattsburgh.

== Sources ==
- The New York Civil List compiled by Franklin Benjamin Hough, Stephen C. Hutchins and Edgar Albert Werner (1870; pg. 444)
- Life Sketches of Executive Officers, and Members of the Legislature of the State of New York, Vol. III by H. H. Boone & Theodore P. Cook (1870; pg. 110ff)

New York State Senate
Preceded by Matthew Hale	New York State Senate; 16th District; 1870–1871	Succeeded by Samuel Ames
