= John H. Selkreg =

American politician

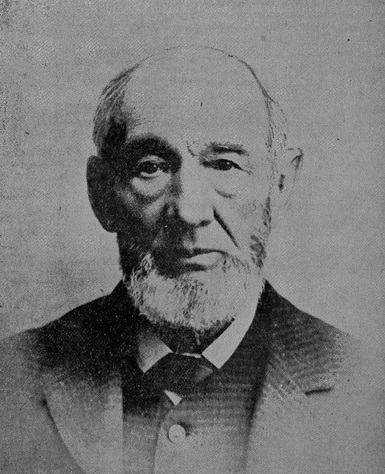
John H. Selkreg, New York State Assemblyman and Senator

John Hopkins Selkreg (September 10, 1817 in Staatsburgh, Dutchess County, New York – October 6, 1906 in Ithaca, Tompkins County, New York) was an American newspaper editor and politician from New York.

== Life ==
He was the son of Capt. John Selkreg (1774–1829) and Betsey Selkreg (1778–1825). He attended the district school in Staatsburgh, and then went to the county seat Poughkeepsie and learned the printer's trade at the Poughkeepsie Telegraph. In 1838, he went to Brooklyn and became co-publisher of the Brooklyn Eagle. The next year he returned to Poughkeepsie and published the Poughkeepsie Casket, a literary paper.

In 1841, he moved to Ithaca, and became first co-publisher, later sole owner, of the Ithaca Journal. The Journal was originally a Democratic paper, but supported Martin Van Buren and the Free Soil Party in 1848, then continued as a Democratic paper until 1856 when Selkreg supported John C. Frémont and adopted a Republican stance.

Selkreg was a Commissioner of Loans from 1857 to 1861; Postmaster of Ithaca from 1861 to 1866; a member of the New York State Assembly (Tompkins Co.) in 1867, 1868, 1869, 1870 and 1871; and a member of the New York State Senate (24th D.) from 1874 to 1877, sitting in the 97th, 98th, 99th and 100th New York State Legislatures.

In 1883, he ran on the Prohibition ticket for the State Assembly.

He was President of the Ithaca and Binghamton Telegraph Company; and of the Ithaca Calendar Clock Company. In 1865, he became Grand Master of Odd Fellows of Northern New York. In 1894, he published Landmarks of Tompkins County. He was married to Clara M. Turner (1818–1891).

He was buried at the Ithaca City Cemetery.

== Sources ==
- Life Sketches of the State Officers, Senators, and Members of the Assembly of the State of New York in 1868 by S. R. Harlow & S. C. Hutchins (pg. 346ff)
- The New York Civil List compiled by Franklin Benjamin Hough, Stephen C. Hutchins and Edgar Albert Werner (1870; pg. 545 and 553)
- Odd Fellowship in NYT on August 23, 1865
- JOHN H. SELKREG'S ACCEPTANCE in NYT on September 30, 1883
- John H. Selkreg in NYT on October 7, 1906

New York State Assembly
Preceded by Lyman Congdon	New York State Assembly; Tompkins County; 1867–1871	Succeeded by Anson W. Knettles
New York State Senate
Preceded by Thomas I. Chatfield	New York State Senate; 24th District; 1874–1877	Succeeded by Peter W. Hopkins
