= Augustus Weismann =

American politician

Augustus Weismann (March 6, 1809, in Kingdom of Württemberg – 1884) was an American politician from New York.

== Life ==
He attended school in his native village and Schorndorf. Then, he became an apothecary. In 1832, he emigrated to the United States, and settled in New York City. In 1833, he opened a small drugstore on Broome Street. In 1834, he married Clara Fabia Loss (born 1815), daughter of City Surveyor Adolphus Loss, and they had five children. From 1846 to 1860, he was a partner in a big drugstore on Broadway. Afterwards, he bought a farm in New Jersey and engaged in agricultural pursuits.

He entered politics as a Democrat, became a Free Soiler in 1848; and joined the Republican Party upon its foundation in 1855. He was appointed as a member of the New York City Board of Education in 1851; was a member of the Board of Supervisors of New York County from 1858 to 1863; and was a member of the New York State Senate (6th D.) in 1872 and 1873.

== Sources ==
- Life Sketches of Executive Officers and Members of the Legislature of the State of New York by William H. McElroy & Alexander McBride (1873; pg. 110ff) [e-book]
- CITY GOVERNMENT IN 1858 in NYT on January 5, 1858

New York State Senate
Preceded by Thomas J. Creamer	New York State Senate; 6th District; 1872–1873	Succeeded by Jacob A. Gross
