= Chauncey S. Sage =

American businessman, politician (1816–1890)

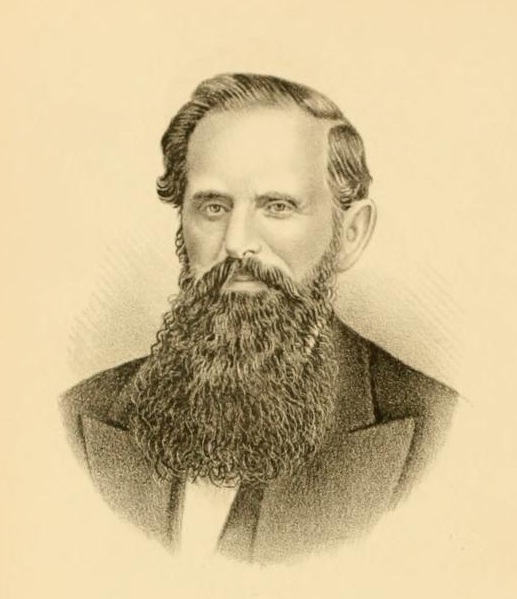
Chauncey S. Sage (1877)

Chauncey S. Sage (September 5, 1816 – November 23, 1890) was an American businessman and politician from New York.

== Life ==
He was born on September 5, 1816, on a farm in Verona, Oneida County, New York, the son of Roswell Sage (1789–1879) and Mercy Sage (1793–1876). He attended the common schools and Verona Academy. In 1840, he married Mary E. Cummings (1821–1842), and they had one son. In 1844, he married Lucy Lee, and they had four children. From 1840 to 1841, he ran the Verona Centre House hotel. Then he sold the hotel and bought a farm near the Village of Oneida instead. In 1848, he moved to a farm in Illinois. In April 1850, he returned to New York, settling on a farm in Williamstown, and engaged in the lumber business.

Sage was Supervisor of the Town of Williamstown in 1855, 1856, 1860, 1862, 1876 and 1877; and a member of the New York State Assembly (Oswego Co., 3rd D.) in 1858, 1871 and 1872; and Postmaster of Williamstown from 1861 to 1882.

He died on November 23, 1890.

== Sources ==
New York State Assembly
Preceded by new district	New York State Assembly; Oswego County, 3rd District; 1858	Succeeded by Beman Brockway
Preceded by John Parker	New York State Assembly; Oswego County, 3rd District; 1871–1872	Succeeded by J. Lyman Bulkley
