= George N. Kennedy =

American politician

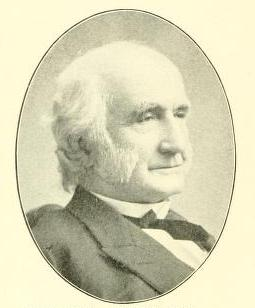
George N. Kennedy

George Nelson Kennedy (September 11, 1822 – September 7, 1901) was an American lawyer and politician from New York.

== Life ==
He was born in Marcellus, New York to George Kennedy and Eunice (Dibble) Kennedy. The family removed to Skaneateles in 1831. He studied law, was admitted to the bar in 1842, and practiced in Marcellus. He married Ann Jennette Tefft (1824–1885), daughter of Assemblyman Lake I. Tefft, and they had several children. In 1854, he removed to Syracuse, and practiced law there in partnership with Charles B. Sedgwick and Charles Andrews.

Kennedy entered politics as a Democrat, joined the Free Soil Party in 1848, returned to the Democratic Party, and finally joined the Republican Party upon its foundation. He was a member of the New York State Senate (22nd D.) from 1868 to 1871, sitting in the 91st, 92nd, 93rd and 94th New York State Legislatures.

He was a justice of the New York Supreme Court (5th D.) from 1884 until the end of 1892 when he reached the constitutional age limit and retired from the bench.

He died from "brain disease and Cheyne-Stokes respiration" at his summer residence in Thousand Island Park, and was buried at the Oakwood Cemetery in Syracuse. He bequeathed $40,000 to Syracuse University.

== Sources ==
- The New York Civil List compiled by Franklin Benjamin Hough, Stephen C. Hutchins and Edgar Albert Werner (1870; pg. 444, 498 and 501)
- Life Sketches of the State Officers, Senators, and Members of the Assembly of the State of New York in 1868 by S. R. Harlow & S. C. Hutchins (pg. 97ff)
- EX-JUSTICE G. M. (sic) KENNEDY DEAD in NYT on september 8, 1901 [After the wrong middle initial, the obit gives the wrong middle name "Nestor."]
- Ex-Justice Kennedy's Bequests in NYT on September 12, 1901

New York State Senate
Preceded by Andrew D. White	New York State Senate; 22nd District; 1868–1871	Succeeded by Daniel P. Wood
