= John S. Marcy =

John Stiles Marcy (March 23, 1830 – May 3, 1885) was an American businessman, farmer, and politician from Riverhead, New York.

== Life ==
Marcy was born on March 23, 1830 in Willimantic, Connecticut, the son of Zebediah and Abigail Marcy.

Marcy grew up on a farm and received a common school education. When he reached his majority he engaged in several successful business ventures. In 1862, he entered the insurance business. In 1871, he bought a farm in Riverhead and moved there. Originally a Democrat, he became a Republican following the Battle of Fort Sumter.

In 1871, Marcy was elected to the New York State Assembly as a Republican, representing Suffolk County. He served in the Assembly in 1872 and 1873. He later invested in the menhaden fishery business and preparing fertilizers from scrap. He moved to Brooklyn shortly before he died.

An active member of the Methodist Church, he was a leading spirit in establishing a camp meeting ground in Jamesport. He served as president and treasurer of the Suffolk County Agricultural Society. In around 1853, he married Sarah L. Case of Brooklyn. He had a son and adopted daughter.

Marcy died at his Brooklyn home from Bright's disease on May 3, 1885. He was buried in the Riverhead Cemetery.

New York State Assembly
Preceded by George F. Carman	New York State Assembly; Suffolk County; 1872–1873	Succeeded by Nathan D. Petty
