= Lewis A. Edwards =

American politician

Lewis Edwards

Member of the New York Senate from the 1st district
- In office January 7, 1868 – May 11, 1869
- Preceded by: Nicholas B. La Bau
- Succeeded by: Samuel H. Frost

Personal details
- Born: June 18, 1811 East Hampton, New York, United States
- Party: Democratic

Lewis A. Edwards (June 18, 1811 – 1879) was an American businessman, manufacturer and politician from New York.

== Life ==
Edwards was born on Gardiners Island, East Hampton, Suffolk County, New York, the son of Sylvanus Edwards (1790–1860) and Sarah (Brown) Edwards (1790–1866). He attended the district schools, and in 1828 went to New York City. There he became first a grocer's clerk, and then collector of wharfage. In 1846, after the death of his employer, he took over the management of the wharfage business. Later he succeeded to the business, becoming the co-lessee of extensive wharf areas, and later added shipping and the building of coastal trade vessels to his business. In 1853, after most of the wharves had been leased to steamship companies, he retired from business, and returned to Suffolk County, settling at Orient. In 1861, he became a partner in a fish oil and guano company.

He was a Democratic member of the New York State Senate (1st D.) in 1868 and 1869; and a presidential elector in 1868, voting for Horatio Seymour and Francis Preston Blair Jr.

== Sources ==
- The New York Civil List compiled by Franklin Benjamin Hough, Stephen C. Hutchins and Edgar Albert Werner (1870; pg. 444 and 591)
- Life Sketches of the State Officers, Senators, and Members of the Assembly of the State of New York in 1868 by S. R. Harlow & S. C. Hutchins (pg. 79ff)

New York State Senate
Preceded by Nicholas B. La Bau	New York State Senate; 1st District; 1868–1869	Succeeded by Samuel H. Frost
