= Senator Minor =

Senator Minor may refer to:

- Edward S. Minor (1840–1924), Wisconsin State Senate
- William T. Minor (1815–1889), Connecticut State Senate

== See also ==
- Senator Miner (disambiguation)
