= Henry Smith (speaker) =

American politician (1829–1884)

Henry Smith (March 14, 1829 – December 1, 1884) was an American lawyer and politician.

== Life ==
He was the son of Thomas Smith, a lawyer.

In 1865, he was elected District Attorney of Albany County, and in 1868 he led the prosecution of George W. Cole (brother of Cornelius Cole) at his trial for the murder of former state assemblyman L. Harris Hiscock.

In the summer of 1869, he was illegally arrested with other Albany and Susquehanna Railroad executive members during Jay Gould and Jim Fisk's attempt to buy the railroad.

He was a Republican member of the New York State Assembly (Albany Co., 2nd D.) in 1867 and 1872; and was Speaker in 1872. During his Speakership, he received a large retainer for legal services rendered to the Erie Railroad at a time when Erie Railroad bills were under debate, which led to accusations that he was bribed to support the bills. The next year a State Senate Investigating Committee probed into this matter.

In 1883, he pronounced his opinion that a "People's Party" should be formed by both Democratic and Republican politicians to oppose "corporate interests" and politicians like John Kelly and John F. Smyth.

Smith died in Albany on December 1, 1884. He was buried at Cobleskill Rural Cemetery in Cobleskill.

== See also ==
- William M. Tweed

New York State Assembly
Preceded by Lyman Tremain	New York State Assembly; Albany County, 2nd District; 1867	Succeeded by Francis H. Woods
Preceded by Robert C. Blackall	New York State Assembly; Albany County, 2nd District; 1872	Succeeded by Henry R. Pierson
Political offices
Preceded by William Hitchman	Speaker of the New York State Assembly; 1872	Succeeded by Alonzo B. Cornell
