= George H. Sanford =

American politician

George H. Sanford (December 14, 1836 – November 25, 1871) was an American politician from New York.

== Life ==
Sanford was born in Queensbury, New York, to Assemblyman George Sanford and Louisa (Gibbs) Sanford. At age twelve, he became a clerk in a store in Glens Falls while attending the common schools in winter. Two years later he became a shipping clerk in a wholesale lumber business in Albany, working there for six years during the navigation season. In winter, he attended school, or went lumbering in Genesee County, New York, and Potter County, Pennsylvania; and attended for one year Rensselaer Polytechnic Institute. About 1857, he removed to Syracuse, and became a merchant, engaging in the lumber and salt trade. In January 1861, he married Helen Breese Stevens (born 1839). In the spring of 1862, he removed to Oneida, in Madison County. He was Vice President of the Oneida Savings Bank; and a director of the Oneida Valley National bank, and the Rome and Clinton Railroad.

He was a delegate to the 1864 Democratic National Convention; Supervisor of the Town of Verona in 1865 and 1866; a member of the New York State Assembly (Oneida County, 3rd D.) in 1867; a delegate to the 1868 Democratic National Convention; and a member of the New York State Senate (19th D.) in 1870 and 1871.

He was buried at the Glenwood Cemetery in Oneida.

== Sources ==
- The New York Civil List compiled by Franklin Benjamin Hough, Stephen C. Hutchins and Edgar Albert Werner (1870; pg. 444 and 507)
- Life Sketches of Executive Officers, and Members of the Legislature of the State of New York, Vol. III by H. H. Boone & Theodore P. Cook (1870; pg. 123ff)
- SENATOR SANFORD in NYT on November 30, 1871

New York State Assembly
| Preceded by Benjamin N. Huntington | New York State Assembly; Oneida County, 3rd District; 1867 | Succeeded by James Stevens |
New York State Senate
| Preceded by Samuel Campbell | New York State Senate; 19th District; 1870–1871 | Succeeded by Samuel S. Lowery |
