= James Wood (New York politician) =

American politician

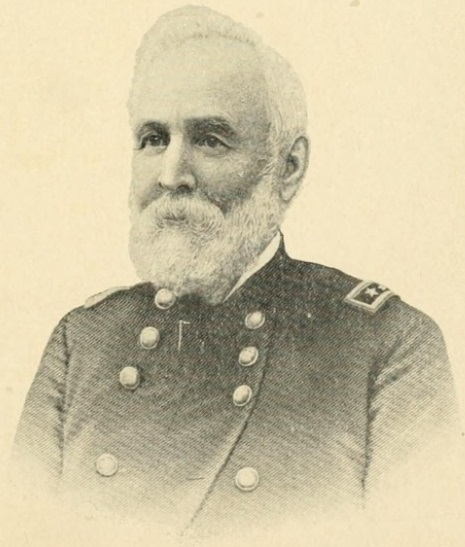
From 1904's Trials and Triumphs: The Record of the Fifty-Fifth Ohio Volunteer Infantry

James Wood (April 4, 1820 – February 25, 1892) was an American lawyer, Union Army General and member of the New York State Senate.

== Life ==
Wood was born in Alstead, New Hampshire. The family removed to New York in 1824, and eventually settled in Lima, in Livingston County, in 1829. He attended the district schools and Genesee Wesleyan Seminary and graduated from Union College in 1842. Then he studied law with John Young, was admitted to the bar in 1843, and commenced practiced in Geneseo in partnership with Young who was elected Governor of New York in 1846. Wood was District Attorney of Livingston County from 1854 to 1856.

He had long been active in the militia, and was appointed a brigadier general in 1855. During the American Civil War he became colonel of the 136th New York Volunteer Infantry, and commanded it at the battles of Chancellorsville, Gettysburg, Lookout Mountain, Missionary Ridge, Resaca, Dallas, Atlanta, Sherman's March to the Sea and Bentonville. He was brevetted a major general of volunteers. Afterwards, he resumed the practice of law at Geneseo.

He was a member of the New York State Senate (30th D.) from 1870 to 1873, sitting in the 93rd, 94th, 95th and 96th New York State Legislatures.

Wood died in Dansville, New York. He was buried at the Temple Hill Cemetery in Geneseo.

== Sources ==
- The New York Civil List compiled by Franklin Benjamin Hough, Stephen C. Hutchins and Edgar Albert Werner (1870; pg. 444 and 541)
- Life Sketches of Executive Officers, and Members of the Legislature of the State of New York, Vol. III by H. H. Boone & Theodore P. Cook (1870; pg. 137ff)

New York State Senate
Preceded by Wolcott J. Humphrey	New York State Senate; 30th District; 1870–1873	Succeeded by Abijah J. Wellman
