= Samuel S. Lowery =

American politician

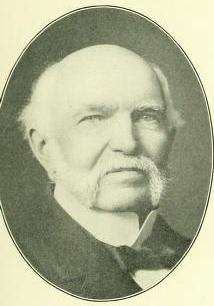
Samuel S. Lowery (1903)

Samuel S. Lowery (February 5, 1831 in County Down, Ireland – April 1912 in Utica, Oneida County, New York) was an American manufacturer and politician from New York.

== Life ==
The family emigrated to the United States in 1840 from Dromara in County Down, and settled in Oriskany, Oneida County, New York. He attended the common schools. Lowery worked in wool mills starting as a teenager. He ran a furnishing goods' store in Utica from about 1855 to 1860, and was engaged in the wool business for about 30 years after that, owning a couple of factories. He gave that up and went into real estate around 1890.

On September 1, 1853, he married Caroline A. Macomber (1831–1909).

A Republican, he was a member of the New York State Assembly (Oneida Co., 1st D.) in 1870; and of the New York State Senate (19th D.) from 1872 to 1875, sitting in the 95th, 96th, 97th and 98th New York State Legislatures. He was chairman of the committees on state prisons and banks while in the Senate.

He died in April 1912 in Utica, New York; and was buried at the Sauquoit Valley Cemetery in Clayville.

Lowery was a Presbyterian, and a trustee at Utica's Westminster Church.

== Sources ==
- The New York Civil List compiled by Franklin Benjamin Hough, Stephen C. Hutchins and Edgar Albert Werner (1870; pg. 513)
- Life Sketches of Executive Officers, and Members of the Legislature of the State of New York, Vol. III by H. H. Boone & Theodore P. Cook (1870; pg. 270f)
- CELEBRATE GOLDEN WEDDING in NYT on September 2, 1903
- Obituary Notes; SAMUEL S. LOWERY in NYT on April 25, 1912

New York State Assembly
Preceded by Eli B. Avery	New York State Assembly; Oneida County, 1st District; 1870	Succeeded by George W. Chadwick
New York State Senate
Preceded by George H. Sanford	New York State Senate; 19th District; 1872–1875	Succeeded by Theodore S. Sayre
