= Thomas E. Stewart =

American politician

Thomas Elliott Stewart
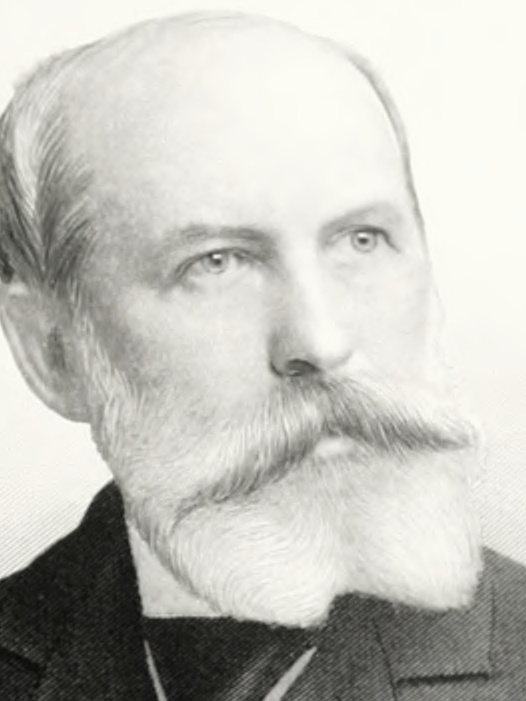

Member of the U.S. House of Representatives from New York's 6th district
- In office March 4, 1867 – March 3, 1869
- Preceded by: Henry J. Raymond
- Succeeded by: Samuel S. Cox

Member of the New York State Assembly for New York County, 7th District
- In office 1865–1866
- Preceded by: Erastus C. Benedict
- Succeeded by: Frank A. Ransom

Personal details
- Born: September 22, 1824 New York City, New York, U.S.
- Died: January 9, 1904 (aged 79) New York City, New York, U.S.
- Resting place: Center Cemetery, New Milford, Connecticut, U.S.
- Party: Republican
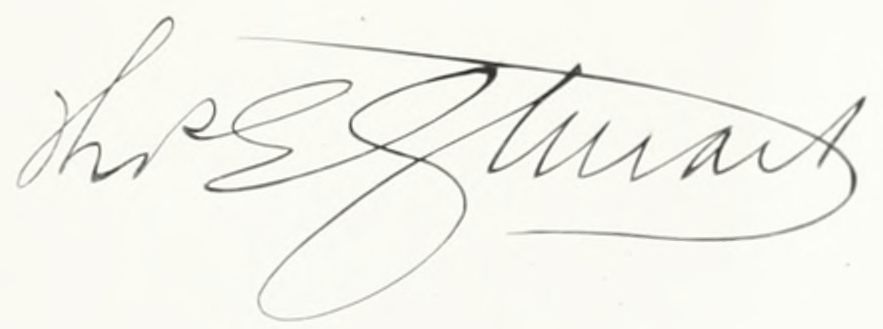
- Signature

Thomas Elliott Stewart (September 22, 1824 – January 9, 1904) was a U.S. representative from New York.

== Biography ==
Born in New York City, Stewart completed preparatory studies, studied law, was admitted to the bar in 1847 and commenced practice in New York City.

He served as a member of the board of education in 1854. He was a member of the New York State Assembly (New York Co., 7th D.) in 1865 and 1866. He served as a member of the Republican State committee from 1866 to 1868.

Stewart was elected as a Conservative Republican to the 40th Congress, defeating a Radical Republican and a Democrat. He served one term, March 4, 1867, to March 3, 1869, and did not run for reelection in 1868. While in Congress, Stewart voted against the impeachment of Andrew Johnson.

After leaving Congress, Stewart resumed the practice of law, and later became involved with the Liberal Republicans, serving as chairman of the party's New York City general committee in 1872.

From 1874 to 1876 Stewart was a member of the New York City Park Commission.

== Death and burial ==
He died in New York City on January 9, 1904, and was interred at Center Cemetery in New Milford, Connecticut.

== Family ==
In 1854 Stewart married Harriet Allen Taylor, daughter of a prominent New Milford physician and Democratic politician who served in the Connecticut House of Representatives and Connecticut State Senate. They were the parents of two sons, George Taylor Stewart and Thomas E. Stewart, Jr.

== Sources ==
- United States Congress. "Thomas E. Stewart (id: S000920)". Biographical Directory of the United States Congress.
- "Thomas E. Stewart's Funeral; Services Over ex-Congressman Held at New Milford, Conn". The New York Times. January 13, 1904.

New York State Assembly
Preceded by Erastus C. Benedict	New York State Assembly; New York County, 7th District; 1865–1866	Succeeded by Frank A. Ransom
U.S. House of Representatives
Preceded by Henry J. Raymond	Member of the U.S. House of Representatives from New York's 6th congressional district 1867–1869	Succeeded by Samuel S. Cox
