= Samuel H. Frost =

American politician

Samuel H. Frost (August 2, 1818 New York City; died c. 1874) was an American politician from New York.

== Life ==
He was the son of Samuel Frost and Catherine (Bedell) Frost. He attended White Plains Academy. About 1840, he removed to a farm on Staten Island. He married Louisa Ketteltas, and they had several children.

He entered politics as a Whig, and after this party disbanded became a Democrat. He was Supervisor of the Town of Westfield from 1851 to 1856; and was Superintendent of the Poor of Richmond County for twelve years. He was a member of the New York State Senate (1st D.) in 1870 and 1871.

By 1874, an article in The New York Times referred to Frost as already being deceased. In 1877, incarcerated former political boss William M. Tweed named Frost as one of the politicians who had engaged in corruption during his political tenure.

== Sources ==
- The New York Civil List compiled by Franklin Benjamin Hough, Stephen C. Hutchins and Edgar Albert Werner (1870; pg. 444)
- Life Sketches of Executive Officers, and Members of the Legislature of the State of New York, Vol. III by H. H. Boone & Theodore P. Cook (1870; pg. 78f)

New York State Senate
Preceded by Lewis A. Edwards	New York State Senate; 1st District; 1870–1871	Succeeded by Townsend D. Cock
