= Franklin W. Tobey =

American politician

Franklin Ward Tobey (February 7, 1844, in Jay, Essex County, New York – May 5, 1878) was an American lawyer and politician from New York.

== Life ==
He was the son of Jesse Tobey (1800–1873) and Elizabeth (Farnsworth) Tobey (1814–1882). He studied law with Augustus C. Hand, was admitted to the bar in 1868, and practiced in Port Henry. He married Jenny Gertrude Ransom (1843–1925), and they had three children.

He was Supervisor of the Town of Moriah in 1869 and 1870; and was Chairman of the Board of Supervisors of Essex County in 1870.

He was a member of the New York State Assembly (Essex Co.) in 1872 and 1873.

He was a member of the New York State Senate (16th D.) from 1874 to 1877, sitting in the 97th, 98th, 99th and 100th New York State Legislatures. He was a delegate to the 1876 Republican National Convention.

During the fall of 1877, he became ill with "oedema of the heart." In December 1877, he went to Aiken, South Carolina trying to improve his health in the milder Southern climate, but did not get better, and decided to return home. He died on May 5, 1878, on board the steamer City of Savannah while en route from Charleston, South Carolina to New York City, and was buried at the Union Cemetery in Port Henry.

== Sources ==
- Life Sketches of Government Officers and Members of the Legislature of the State of New York in 1875 by W. H. McElroy and Alexander McBride (pg. 104ff) [e-book]
- FRANKLIN W. TOBEY in NYT on May 8, 1878
- Tobey genealogy

New York State Assembly
Preceded by Clayton H. DeLano	New York State Assembly; Essex County; 1872–1873	Succeeded by Gardiner Pope
New York State Senate
Preceded by Samuel Ames	New York State Senate; 16th District; 1874–1877	Succeeded by William W. Rockwell
