= Anson S. Wood =

American politician

Anson Sprague Wood (October 2, 1834 – August 21, 1904) was an American lawyer and politician from New York.

== Life ==
Wood was born on October 2, 1834, in Camillus, New York, the son of Alvin Wood and Fanny Woodworth.

In 1842, Wood and his family moved to Butler. He attended Red Creek Union Academy. In 1853, he studied in a law office in Syracuse for a few months. For the next two years, he taught school in the winter and read law in Clyde during the summer, first with C. D. Lawton and then with County Judge and Surrogate L. S. Ketchum. He entered Albany Law School in 1855, and was admitted to the bar later that year. He opened a law office in South Butler in January 1856, and was elected school superintendent in March. In July, he moved to Lyons and formed a law partnership with state senator William Clark and assemblyman DeWitt Parshall. He practiced law with them until September 1862. He was also elected town clerk twice.

In August 1862, during the American Civil War, Wood enrolled in the 138th New York Infantry Regiment (later the 9th New York Heavy Artillery Regiment) and was mustered in as a first lieutenant in Company D. In March 1863, he was appointed adjutant. In June 1863, he was promoted to captain of Company M. He was transferred back to Company D in January 1865. He was promoted to major in February 1865.

Wood was initially detached to Elmira, where he worked in draft rendezvous and served as assistant adjutant general of the post. He returned at his own request to his command and regiment in May 1864. He served on General James B. Ricketts' staff in October 1864, and after the general was severely wounded he continued on General Truman Seymour's staff as judge advocate. He returned to his regiment when he was promoted to major. He resigned his commission after the war in May 1865, with the rank of brevet rank of lieutenant colonel. He participated in the Battles of Cold Harbor, Petersburg, Monocacy, Winchester, and Fisher's Hill.

After the war, Wood bought a farm in Butler. In 1866, he was elected town supervisor. From 1867 to 1869, he served as assistant assessor of the US Internal Revenue. He later moved to Wolcott and resumed practicing law. In 1869, he was elected to the New York State Assembly as a Republican, representing the Wayne County 1st District. He served in the Assembly in 1870 and 1871. In 1872, he was appointed deputy Secretary of State of New York under G. Hilton Scribner. He held the office for two years, and then returned to practicing law in Wolcott. In 1879, he was again appointed deputy Secretary of State of New York under Joseph B. Carr, serving in the position for six years. In the 1885 New York state election, he was the Republican candidate for Secretary of State of New York. After he lost, he practiced law in Albany for a year and then resumed practicing law in Wolcott with George S. Horton, residing in Port Bay. He also served as president of the village of Wolcott, trustee of the Wolcott Union Free School, justice of the peace, and town supervisor of Huron.

In 1858, Wood married Martha Louise Vickery of Youngstown. They had two sons, William Clark and Robert Alvin. He was an organizer and commander of his local post of the Grand Army of the Republic, and served as assistant quartermaster general and commander of the state department. He was a member of the Freemasons.

Wood died at home on August 21, 1904. He was buried in the family lot in the South Butler cemetery.

New York State Assembly
Preceded by Merritt Thornton	New York State Assembly; Wayne County, 1st District; 1870-1871	Succeeded by Edward B. Wells
