= Abraham V. Harpending =

American politician

Abraham V. Harpending (July 9, 1816 – April 23, 1871) was an American lawyer and politician from New York.

== Life ==
He was born on July 9, 1816, in Plainview, then in Ontario County, now Dundee, in Yates County, New York, the son of Samuel Harpending (1778–1852) and Hannah (Cosad) Harpending (1782–1880).

He was first a Whig and then joined the Republican Party. He never married.

He was District Attorney of Yates County from 1854 to 1856; and a member of the New York State Assembly (Yates Co.) in 1857.

He was a member of the New York State Senate (26th D.) in 1870 and 1871. He was elected on December 28, 1869, to fill the vacancy caused by the resignation of Senator-elect Charles J. Folger.

Harpending died at the Congress Hall Hotel in Albany, New York, two days after the end of the session of 1871, and was buried at the Old Baptist Cemetery in Dundee.

New York State Assembly
Preceded by Henry H. Gage	New York State Assembly; Yates County; 1857	Succeeded by John Mather
New York State Senate
Preceded by Charles J. Folger	New York State Senate; 26th District; 1870–1871	Succeeded by William Johnson
