= Jacob Hardenbergh =

American politician (1823–1872)

Jacob Hardenbergh (May 1823 New Paltz, Ulster County, New York – April 29, 1872 Albany, New York) was an American lawyer and politician from New York.

== Life ==
He was the son of Richard Hardenbergh (1791–1870) and Catharine Maria (Crispell) Hardenbergh (1790–1833). The family removed to Shawangunk in 1829. He attended New Paltz Academy, and graduated from Rutgers College in 1844. Then he became a teacher at Fonda Academy, and at the same time studied law. He was admitted to the bar in 1849, and commenced practice in Kingston. On April 3, 1850, he married Anna Elisabeth Holmes.

He was a delegate to the New York State Constitutional Convention of 1867–68; and a member of the New York State Senate (14th D.) from 1870 until his death, sitting in the 93rd, 94th and 95th New York State Legislatures. He died near the end of the session, after being confined to his room by illness during two months, and was buried at the Wiltwyck Cemetery in Kingston.

== Family ==
Hardenbergh descends from six of the twelve Patentees, or founders, of New Paltz, New York, including Louis DuBois and Abraham Hasbrouck of the Hasbrouck family. He is the third great-grandson of Johannes Hardenbergh, and great-great-nephew of Jacob Rutsen Hardenbergh.

He had at least five siblings: Lewis Hardenburgh (1816–1901), Asenath Hardenbergh Schoonmaker (1821–1900), Catharine Maria Hardenburgh McKinstry (1823–1917), Leah Hardenburgh (1825–1898) and Cornelia Hardenburgh Hendricks (1831–1906). His brother-in-law, Daniel Schoonmaker (1821–1877) served a term in the New York State Assembly in 1855.

== Sources ==
- The New York Civil List compiled by Franklin Benjamin Hough, Stephen C. Hutchins and Edgar Albert Werner (1870; pg. 444 and 593)
- Life Sketches of Executive Officers, and Members of the Legislature of the State of New York, Vol. III by H. H. Boone & Theodore P. Cook (1870; pg. 84ff) [gives erroneously surname "Hardenburgh"]
- Hardenbergh genealogy
- ALBANY; Death of Senator Hardenbergh in NYT on April 30, 1872

New York State Senate
Preceded by George Beach	New York State Senate; 14th District; 1870–1872	Succeeded by William F. Scoresby
