= Thomas C. Fields =

American lawyer, politician, and Tweed Ring member (1825–1885)

Member of the New York Senate from the 7th district
- In office 1864–1865
- Preceded by: Richard B. Connolly
- Succeeded by: Thomas Murphy

Member of the New York State Assembly from the New York County, 19th district
- In office 1870–1872
- Preceded by: Josiah Porter
- Succeeded by: James A. Derring

Member of the New York State Assembly from the New York County, 17th district
- In office 1863–1863
- Preceded by: Edward Jones
- Succeeded by: Sidney P. Ingraham Jr.

New York City Park Commissioner
- In office 1870–1872

Central Park Commissioner
- In office 1857–1870

Personal details
- Born: November 9, 1825 St. Lawrence County, New York, U.S.
- Died: January 25, 1885 (aged 59) Saint-André-d'Argenteuil, Quebec, Canada
- Party: Democratic
- Spouse: Annie E. Smith (m. 1847)
- Occupation: Lawyer, politician

Thomas Craig Fields (November 9, 1825 – January 25, 1885) was an American lawyer, politician, and member of the Tweed Ring from New York. He served in the New York State Assembly and the New York State Senate, and later became a fugitive from justice, dying in exile in Canada.

== Early life and legal career ==
Fields was born on November 9, 1825, in St. Lawrence County, New York. He studied law in Delhi, was admitted to the bar in 1846, and practiced in New York City.

In 1847, he married Annie E. Smith.

== Political career ==
Fields was a member of the New York State Assembly (New York County, 17th District) in 1863.

He was a member of the New York State Senate (7th District) in 1864 and 1865.

He served again in the State Assembly (New York County, 19th District) in 1870, 1871, and 1872.

=== Park Commissioner ===
Fields served as a Central Park Commissioner from 1857 to 1870 and as a New York City Park Commissioner from 1870 to 1872.

=== Tweed Ring and impeachment involvement ===
Fields was a member of the Tweed Ring, the corrupt political organization led by William M. Tweed.

During the impeachment of New York State Supreme Court Justice George G. Barnard, among the charges it was noted that Barnard denied alimony to Annie E. Fields on behalf of her husband.

=== Fleeing justice ===
In October 1872, Fields fled the country to escape prosecution for his role in the Tweed Ring. He first went to Cuba, then to Europe, and finally to Canada.

In May 1873, a verdict was returned against Fields at the suit of the People for $554,062.73 in connection with the firemen's claims.

== Death ==
Fields died while a fugitive from justice on January 25, 1885, at his residence "The Priory" near St. Andrews in Saint-André-d'Argenteuil, Quebec, Canada. He was 59 years old.

New York State Assembly
Preceded by Edward Jones	New York State Assembly; New York County, 17th District; 1863	Succeeded by Sidney P. Ingraham Jr.
Preceded by Josiah Porter	New York State Assembly; New York County, 19th District; 1870–1872	Succeeded by James A. Derring
New York State Senate
Preceded by Richard B. Connolly	New York State Senate; 7th District; 1864–1865	Succeeded by Thomas Murphy
