= 94th New York State Legislature =

New York state legislative session

←	93rd	95th	→
- The Old State Capitol (1879)

Overview
- Legislative body: New York State Legislature
- Jurisdiction: New York, United States
- Term: January 1 – December 31, 1871

Senate
- Members: 32
- President: Lt. Gov. Allen C. Beach (D)
- Party control: Democratic (17-14)

Assembly
- Members: 128
- Speaker: William Hitchman (D)
- Party control: Democratic (65-63)

Sessions
- 1st: January 3 – April 21, 1871

The 94th New York State Legislature, consisting of the New York State Senate and the New York State Assembly, met from January 3 to April 21, 1871, during the third year of John T. Hoffman's governorship, in Albany.

== Background ==
Under the provisions of the New York Constitution of 1846, 32 Senators and 128 assemblymen were elected in single-seat districts; senators for a two-year term, assemblymen for a one-year term. The senatorial districts were made up of entire counties, except New York County (five districts) and Kings County (two districts). The Assembly districts were made up of entire towns, or city wards, forming a contiguous area, all within the same county.

At this time there were two major political parties: the Republican Party and the Democratic Party.

== Elections ==
The 1870 New York state election was held on November 8. Gov. John T. Hoffman and Lt. Gov. Allen C. Beach were re-elected. The other four statewide elective offices up for election were also carried by the Democrats. The approximate party strength at this election, as expressed by the vote for Governor, was: Democrats 399,000 and Republicans 366,000.

== Sessions ==
The Legislature met for the regular session at the Old State Capitol in Albany on January 3, 1871; and adjourned on April 21.

William Hitchman (D) was re-elected Speaker with 64 votes against 62 for James W. Husted (R).

On April 4, the Legislature re-elected Abram B. Weaver (D) to a second term of three years as Superintendent of Public Instruction.

On April 7, Assemblyman James Irving had an altercation with Assemblyman Smith M. Weed, during which Irving hit Weed forceful in the face. Subsequently, Irving resigned his seat, and the Democrats could not pass any bills anymore, a vote of 65 being required. After a week of deadlock, Republican Assemblyman Orange S. Winans voiced his opinion that the Democrats were entitled to a majority, and voted with them, thus passing the pending bills. Winans was denounced as a traitor, and disappeared from politics.

== State Senate ==
=== Districts ===
- 1st District: Queens, Richmond and Suffolk counties
- 2nd District: 1st, 2nd, 3rd, 4th, 5th, 7th, 11th, 13th, 15th, 19th and 20th wards of the City of Brooklyn
- 3rd District: 6th, 8th, 9th, 10th, 12th, 14th, 16th, 17th and 18th wards of the City of Brooklyn; and all towns in Kings County
- 4th District: 1st, 2nd, 3rd, 4th, 5th, 6th, 7th, 13th and 14th wards of New York City
- 5th District: 8th, 9th, 15th and 16th wards of New York City
- 6th District: 10th, 11th and 17th wards of New York City
- 7th District: 18th, 20th and 21st wards of New York City
- 8th District: 12th, 19th and 22nd wards of New York City
- 9th District: Putnam, Rockland and Westchester counties
- 10th District: Orange and Sullivan counties
- 11th District: Columbia and Dutchess counties
- 12th District: Rensselaer and Washington counties
- 13th District: Albany County
- 14th District: Greene and Ulster counties
- 15th District: Fulton, Hamilton, Montgomery, Saratoga and Schenectady counties
- 16th District: Clinton, Essex and Warren counties
- 17th District: Franklin and St. Lawrence counties
- 18th District: Jefferson and Lewis counties
- 19th District: Oneida County
- 20th District: Herkimer and Otsego counties
- 21st District: Madison and Oswego counties
- 22nd District: Onondaga and Cortland counties
- 23rd District: Chenango, Delaware and Schoharie counties
- 24th District: Broome, Tompkins and Tioga counties
- 25th District: Cayuga and Wayne counties
- 26th District: Ontario, Seneca and Yates counties
- 27th District: Chemung, Schuyler and Steuben counties
- 28th District: Monroe County
- 29th District: Genesee, Niagara and Orleans counties
- 30th District: Allegany, Livingston and Wyoming counties
- 31st District: Erie County
- 32nd District: Cattaraugus and Chautauqua counties
Note: There are now 62 counties in the State of New York. The counties which are not mentioned in this list had not yet been established, or sufficiently organized, the area being included in one or more of the abovementioned counties.

=== Members ===
The asterisk (*) denotes members of the previous Legislature who continued in office as members of this Legislature.

District	Senator	Party	Notes
1st	Samuel H. Frost*	Democrat	
2nd	James F. Pierce*	Democrat	
3rd	Henry C. Murphy*	Democrat	
4th	William M. Tweed*	Democrat	
5th	Michael Norton*	Democrat	
6th	Thomas J. Creamer*	Democrat	
7th	John J. Bradley*	Democrat	
8th	Henry W. Genet*	Democrat	
9th	William Cauldwell*	Democrat	
10th	William M. Graham*	Democrat	
11th	George Morgan*	Democrat	until March 1871, also Mayor of Poughkeepsie
12th	Francis S. Thayer*	Republican	
13th	A. Bleecker Banks*	Democrat	
14th	Jacob Hardenbergh*	Democrat	
15th	vacant		Senator Isaiah Blood died on November 29, 1870
16th	Christopher F. Norton*	Democrat	
17th	Abraham X. Parker*	Republican	
18th	Norris Winslow*	Republican	
19th	George H. Sanford*	Democrat	died on November 25, 1871
20th	Augustus R. Elwood*	Republican	
21st	William H. Brand*	Republican	
22nd	George N. Kennedy*	Republican	
23rd	John F. Hubbard Jr.*	Democrat	
24th	Orlow W. Chapman*	Republican	
25th	William B. Woodin*	Republican	also Surrogate of Cayuga County
26th	Abraham V. Harpending*	Republican	died on April 23, 1871
27th	Theodore L. Minier*	Republican	
28th	Jarvis Lord*	Democrat	
29th	George Bowen*	Republican	
30th	James Wood*	Republican	
31st	Loran L. Lewis*	Republican	
32nd	Allen D. Scott*	Republican	

=== Employees ===
- Clerk: Hiram Calkins
- Sergeant-at-Arms: George Graham
- Assistant Sergeant-at-Arms: Abraham J. Meyers
- Doorkeeper: Alexander H. Waterman
- Assistant Doorkeeper: W. W. McKinney
- Assistant Doorkeeper: John Drew
- Assistant Doorkeeper: Orson Root
- Assistant Doorkeeper: Cornelius V. Simpkins
- Stenographer: Andrew Devine

== State Assembly ==
=== Assemblymen ===
The asterisk (*) denotes members of the previous Legislature who continued as members of this Legislature.

Party affiliations follow the vote for Speaker.

District		Assemblymen	Party	Notes
Albany	1st	William D. Murphy*	Democrat	
Albany	2nd	Robert C. Blackall	Republican	
Albany	3rd	Edward Coyle	Democrat	
Albany	4th	William D. Sunderlin	Republican	
Allegany		Charles N. Flenagin*	Republican	
Broome		William M. Ely*	Republican	
Cattaraugus	1st	Claudius V. B. Barse	Republican	
Cattaraugus	2nd	Stephen C. Green*	Republican	
Cayuga	1st	Charles H. Curtis	Democrat	
Cayuga	2nd	Stephen S. Hewitt*	Republican	
Chautauqua	1st	Matthew P. Bemus*	Republican	
Chautauqua	2nd	Orange S. Winans*	Republican	
Chemung		David B. Hill	Democrat	
Chenango		Andrew Shepardson	Republican	
Clinton		Smith M. Weed	Democrat	
Columbia	1st	Benjamin Ray	Democrat	
Columbia	2nd	Perkins F. Cady	Republican	
Cortland		Henry S. Randall	Democrat	
Delaware	1st	Alpheus Bolt*	Republican	
Delaware	2nd	James H. Graham	Republican	
Dutchess	1st	James A. Seward*	Republican	
Dutchess	2nd	David H. Mulford*	Republican	
Erie	1st	George Chambers	Democrat	
Erie	2nd	John Howell	Democrat	
Erie	3rd	Franklin A. Alberger	Republican	
Erie	4th	Harry B. Ransom*	Democrat	
Erie	5th	John M. Wiley	Democrat	
Essex		Clayton H. DeLano*	Republican	
Franklin		James H. Pierce*	Republican	
Fulton and Hamilton		Mortimer Wade	Republican	
Genesee		Volney G. Knapp	Republican	
Greene		Hiram Van Steenburgh*	Democrat	
Herkimer		Daniel A. Northup*	Republican	
Jefferson	1st	Oliver C. Wyman	Republican	
Jefferson	2nd	James Johnson	Republican	
Kings	1st	David C. Aitken	Democrat	
Kings	2nd	Smith C. Baylis	Democrat	
Kings	3rd	Dominick H. Roche	Democrat	
Kings	4th	William W. Moseley*	Democrat	
Kings	5th	William W. Goodrich	Republican	
Kings	6th	Bernard Haver*	Democrat	
Kings	7th	William Wainwright	Democrat	
Kings	8th	Samuel F. Conselyea	Democrat	
Kings	9th	John C. Jacobs*	Democrat	
Lewis		Joseph Pahud	Republican	
Livingston		Richard Johnson*	Republican	
Madison	1st	David L. Fisk	Republican	
Madison	2nd	Leonard C. Kilham*	Republican	
Monroe	1st	Richard D. Cole	Democrat	
Monroe	2nd	George D. Lord	Democrat	
Monroe	3rd	Volney P. Brown*	Republican	
Montgomery		Webster Wagner	Republican	
New York	1st	Michael Madigan	Democrat	
New York	2nd	Dennis Burns*	Democrat	
New York	3rd	John Hayes	Democrat	
New York	4th	John J. Blair*	Democrat	
New York	5th	George L. Loutrel	Democrat	
New York	6th	Timothy J. Campbell*	Democrat	
New York	7th	John Carey*	Democrat	unsuccessfully contested by Horatio N. Twombly (R)
New York	8th	Martin Nachtmann*	Democrat	
New York	9th	James O'Neill	Democrat	
New York	10th	Christopher Flecke	Democrat	
New York	11th	Lawrence O'Brien	Democrat	
New York	12th	William W. Cook*	Democrat	
New York	13th	Richard Flanagan*	Democrat	
New York	14th	John Tyler Kelly	Democrat	
New York	15th	Alexander Frear*	Democrat	
New York	16th	James Irving*	Democrat	resigned his seat on April 10
New York	17th	Edmond Connelly	Democrat	
New York	18th	Leander Buck	Democrat	
New York	19th	Thomas C. Fields*	Democrat	
New York	20th	John Brown*	Democrat	
New York	21st	William Hitchman*	Democrat	re-elected Speaker
Niagara	1st	John E. Pound	Republican	
Niagara	2nd	Lee R. Sanborn*	Republican	
Oneida	1st	George W. Chadwick	Republican	
Oneida	2nd	Sidney A. Bunce	Republican	
Oneida	3rd	Thomas Mulhall	Democrat	
Oneida	4th	Isaac McDougal	Republican	
Onondaga	1st	Thomas G. Alvord*	Republican	
Onondaga	2nd	Peter Burns	Republican	
Onondaga	3rd	Gustavus Sniper*	Republican	
Ontario	1st	George W. Nicholas	Democrat	
Ontario	2nd	David E. Wilson*	Republican	
Orange	1st	Robert H. Strahan	Republican	
Orange	2nd	Isaac V. Montanye	Democrat	
Orleans		John Berry*	Republican	
Oswego	1st	DeWitt C. Littlejohn*	Republican	
Oswego	2nd	Abraham Howe*	Democrat	
Oswego	3rd	Chauncey S. Sage	Republican	
Otsego	1st	Alfred Chamberlain	Democrat	
Otsego	2nd	J. Lee Tucker	Republican	
Putnam		Sarles Drew	Democrat	
Queens	1st	L. Bradford Prince	Republican	
Queens	2nd	James M. Oakley	Democrat	
Rensselaer	1st	John L. Flagg*	Democrat	
Rensselaer	2nd	Horace C. Gifford	Republican	
Rensselaer	3rd	Sylvester Waterbury	Democrat	
Richmond		John Decker*	Democrat	
Rockland		James M. Nelson*	Democrat	
St. Lawrence	1st	George M. Gleason*	Republican	
St. Lawrence	2nd	Dolphus S. Lynde	Republican	
St. Lawrence	3rd	William Bradford*	Republican	
Saratoga	1st	Isaiah Fuller*	Democrat	
Saratoga	2nd	Joseph W. Hill	Republican	
Schenectady		Gershom Banker*	Democrat	
Schoharie		Silas Sweet*	Democrat	
Schuyler		William C. Coon*	Democrat	
Seneca		Sanford R. Ten Eyck	Democrat	
Steuben	1st	James G. Bennett*	Democrat	
Steuben	2nd	Alvin C. Barney	Republican	
Suffolk		George F. Carman	Republican	
Sullivan		Frank Buckley	Democrat	
Tioga		Burnett B. Bignall	Republican	
Tompkins		John H. Selkreg*	Republican	
Ulster	1st	Cyrus Burhans	Republican	
Ulster	2nd	C. Meech Woolsey	Republican	
Ulster	3rd	Charles H. Krack*	Democrat	
Warren		Duncan Griffin	Democrat	
Washington	1st	Thomas Stevenson*	Republican	
Washington	2nd	Isaac V. Baker Jr.*	Republican	
Wayne	1st	Anson S. Wood*	Republican	
Wayne	2nd	Henry R. Durfee	Republican	
Westchester	1st	G. Hilton Scribner	Republican	on November 7, 1871, elected Secretary of State of New York
Westchester	2nd	Alfred W. Bartlett	Democrat	
Westchester	3rd	James W. Husted*	Republican	
Wyoming		Henry S. Joy	Democrat	
Yates		George P. Lord	Republican	

=== Employees ===
- Clerk: Cornelius W. Armstrong
- Sergeant-at-Arms: Jeriah G. Rhoads
- Doorkeeper: Andrew S. Scobey
- First Assistant Doorkeeper: James Keenan
- Second Assistant Doorkeeper: Allen W. Seaman

== Sources ==
- The New York Civil List compiled by Franklin Benjamin Hough, Stephen C. Hutchins and Edgar Albert Werner (1870; see pg. 439 for Senate districts; pg. 444 for senators; pg. 450–463 for Assembly districts)
- Journal of the Assembly (94th Session) (1871; Vol. I)
- Journal of the Assembly (94th Session) (1871; Vol. II)
