= 93rd New York State Legislature =

New York state legislative session

←	92nd	94th	→
- The Old State Capitol (1879)

Overview
- Legislative body: New York State Legislature
- Jurisdiction: New York, United States
- Term: January 1 – December 31, 1870

Senate
- Members: 32
- President: Lt. Gov. Allen C. Beach (D)
- Temporary President: Henry C. Murphy (D), from January 17
- Party control: Democratic (18-14)

Assembly
- Members: 128
- Speaker: William Hitchman (D)
- Party control: Democratic (73-55)

Sessions
- 1st: January 4 – April 26, 1870

The 93rd New York State Legislature, consisting of the New York State Senate and the New York State Assembly, met from January 4 to April 26, 1870, during the 2nd year term of John T. Hoffman governorship, in Albany.

== Background ==
Under the provisions of the New York Constitution of 1846, 32 Senators and 128 assemblymen were elected in single-seat districts; senators for a two-year term, assemblymen for a one-year term. The senatorial districts were made up of entire counties, except New York County (five districts) and Kings County (two districts). The Assembly districts were made up of entire towns, or city wards, forming a contiguous area, all within the same county.

At this time there were two major political parties: the Republican Party and the Democratic Party.

== Elections ==
The 1869 New York state election was held on November 3. All nine statewide elective offices up for election were carried by the Democrats. All amendments proposed by the Constitutional Convention, except the re-organization of the judicial system, were rejected by the voters. The approximate party strength at this election, as expressed by the vote for Secretary of State, was: Democrats 331,000 and Republicans 310,000.

== Sessions ==
The Legislature met for the regular session at the Old State Capitol in Albany on January 4, 1870; and adjourned on April 26.

William Hitchman (D) was again elected Speaker with 72 votes against 51 for James W. Husted (R).

On January 17, Henry C. Murphy (D) was elected president pro tempore of the State Senate.

On February 10, the Legislature re-elected Joseph S. Bosworth (D) as a Metropolitan Police Commissioner, for a term of eight years beginning on March 1, 1870.

== State Senate ==
=== Districts ===
- 1st District: Queens, Richmond and Suffolk counties
- 2nd District: 1st, 2nd, 3rd, 4th, 5th, 7th, 11th, 13th, 15th, 19th and 20th wards of the City of Brooklyn
- 3rd District: 6th, 8th, 9th, 10th, 12th, 14th, 16th, 17th and 18th wards of the City of Brooklyn; and all towns in Kings County
- 4th District: 1st, 2nd, 3rd, 4th, 5th, 6th, 7th, 13th and 14th wards of New York City
- 5th District: 8th, 9th, 15th and 16th wards of New York City
- 6th District: 10th, 11th and 17th wards of New York City
- 7th District: 18th, 20th and 21st wards of New York City
- 8th District: 12th, 19th and 22nd wards of New York City
- 9th District: Putnam, Rockland and Westchester counties
- 10th District: Orange and Sullivan counties
- 11th District: Columbia and Dutchess counties
- 12th District: Rensselaer and Washington counties
- 13th District: Albany County
- 14th District: Greene and Ulster counties
- 15th District: Fulton, Hamilton, Montgomery, Saratoga and Schenectady counties
- 16th District: Clinton, Essex and Warren counties
- 17th District: Franklin and St. Lawrence counties
- 18th District: Jefferson and Lewis counties
- 19th District: Oneida County
- 20th District: Herkimer and Otsego counties
- 21st District: Madison and Oswego counties
- 22nd District: Onondaga and Cortland counties
- 23rd District: Chenango, Delaware and Schoharie counties
- 24th District: Broome, Tompkins and Tioga counties
- 25th District: Cayuga and Wayne counties
- 26th District: Ontario, Seneca and Yates counties
- 27th District: Chemung, Schuyler and Steuben counties
- 28th District: Monroe County
- 29th District: Genesee, Niagara and Orleans counties
- 30th District: Allegany, Livingston and Wyoming counties
- 31st District: Erie County
- 32nd District: Cattaraugus and Chautauqua counties
Note: There are now 62 counties in the State of New York. The counties which are not mentioned in this list had not yet been established, or sufficiently organized, the area being included in one or more of the abovementioned counties.

=== Members ===
The asterisk (*) denotes members of the previous Legislature who continued in office as members of this Legislature.

Party affiliations follow the vote for Senate Clerk and Police Commissioner.

District	Senator	Party	Notes
1st	Samuel H. Frost	Democrat	
2nd	James F. Pierce*	Democrat	re-elected; took his seat on January 11
3rd	Henry C. Murphy*	Democrat	re-elected; on January 17, elected president pro tempore
4th	William M. Tweed*	Democrat	re-elected
5th	Michael Norton*	Democrat	re-elected; also an Alderman of New York City
6th	Thomas J. Creamer*	Democrat	re-elected
7th	John J. Bradley*	Democrat	re-elected
8th	Henry W. Genet*	Democrat	re-elected
9th	William Cauldwell*	Democrat	re-elected
10th	William M. Graham*	Democrat	re-elected
11th	George Morgan	Democrat	also Mayor of Poughkeepsie
12th	Francis S. Thayer*	Republican	re-elected
13th	A. Bleecker Banks*	Democrat	re-elected
14th	Jacob Hardenbergh	Democrat	took his seat on January 6
15th	Isaiah Blood	Democrat	died on November 29, 1870
16th	Christopher F. Norton	Democrat	
17th	Abraham X. Parker*	Republican	re-elected
18th	Norris Winslow	Republican	
19th	George H. Sanford	Democrat	
20th	Augustus R. Elwood	Republican	
21st	William H. Brand	Republican	
22nd	George N. Kennedy*	Republican	re-elected
23rd	John F. Hubbard Jr.*	Democrat	re-elected
24th	Orlow W. Chapman*	Republican	re-elected
25th	William B. Woodin	Republican	also Surrogate of Cayuga County
26th	Abraham V. Harpending	Republican	took his seat on January 11
27th	Theodore L. Minier	Republican	
28th	Jarvis Lord	Democrat	
29th	George Bowen	Republican	
30th	James Wood	Republican	
31st	Loran L. Lewis	Republican	
32nd	Allen D. Scott	Republican	

=== Employees ===
- Clerk: Hiram Calkins
- Sergeant-at-Arms: George Graham
- Assistant Sergeant-at-Arms: Abraham J. Meyers
- Doorkeeper: Alexander H. Waterman
- Assistant Doorkeeper: W. W. McKinney
- Assistant Doorkeeper: John Drew
- Assistant Doorkeeper: Orson Root
- Assistant Doorkeeper: Cornelius V. Simpkins
- Stenographer: Andrew Devine, from February 10

== State Assembly ==
=== Assemblymen ===
The asterisk (*) denotes members of the previous Legislature who continued as members of this Legislature.

Party affiliations follow the vote for Speaker.

District		Assemblymen	Party	Notes
Albany	1st	William D. Murphy	Democrat	unsuccessfully contested by Stephen Springsted
Albany	2nd	Thomas J. Lanahan	Democrat	
Albany	3rd	Edward D. Ronan	Democrat	
Albany	4th	John Tighe*	Democrat	
Allegany		Charles N. Flenagin	Republican	
Broome		William M. Ely*	Republican	
Cattaraugus	1st	George N. West	Republican	
Cattaraugus	2nd	Stephen C. Green	Republican	
Cayuga	1st	William H. Eaker	Republican	
Cayuga	2nd	Stephen S. Hewitt	Republican	
Chautauqua	1st	Matthew P. Bemus*	Republican	
Chautauqua	2nd	Orange S. Winans	Republican	
Chemung		Edward L. Patrick*	Democrat	
Chenango		Samuel L. Brown	Democrat	
Clinton		Daniel G. Dodge	Democrat	
Columbia	1st	Edward Sturges*	Democrat	
Columbia	2nd	Daniel D. Barnes	Democrat	
Cortland		Charles Foster	Republican	
Delaware	1st	Alpheus Bolt	Republican	
Delaware	2nd	Orson M. Allaben	Democrat	
Dutchess	1st	James A. Seward	Republican	
Dutchess	2nd	David H. Mulford	Republican	
Erie	1st	George J. Bamler*	Democrat	
Erie	2nd	James Franklin	Republican	
Erie	3rd	Albert H. Blossom	Republican	
Erie	4th	Harry B. Ransom	Democrat	
Erie	5th	Lyman Oatman	Republican	
Essex		Clayton H. DeLano	Republican	
Franklin		James H. Pierce	Republican	
Fulton and Hamilton		John F. Empie	Democrat	
Genesee		Edward C. Walker*	Republican	
Greene		Hiram Van Steenburgh	Democrat	
Herkimer		Daniel A. Northup	Republican	
Jefferson	1st	Jay Dimick*	Republican	
Jefferson	2nd	William W. Butterfield*	Republican	
Kings	1st	Hugh M. Clark*	Democrat	
Kings	2nd	Henry J. Cullen Jr.*	Democrat	
Kings	3rd	Dennis O'Keeffe*	Democrat	
Kings	4th	William W. Moseley*	Democrat	
Kings	5th	William C. Jones	Democrat	unsuccessfully contested by William W. Goodrich (R)
Kings	6th	Bernard Haver	Democrat	
Kings	7th	Samuel T. Maddox	Republican	
Kings	8th	Joseph Droll	Democrat	
Kings	9th	John C. Jacobs*	Democrat	
Lewis		Jay A. Pease	Democrat	
Livingston		Richard Johnson	Republican	
Madison	1st	Joseph W. Merchant	Republican	
Madison	2nd	Leonard C. Kilham*	Republican	
Monroe	1st	Charles S. Wright*	Republican	
Monroe	2nd	James S. Graham	Republican	
Monroe	3rd	Volney P. Brown	Republican	
Montgomery		James Shanahan	Democrat	
New York	1st	Michael C. Murphy*	Democrat	
New York	2nd	Dennis Burns*	Democrat	
New York	3rd	Owen Cavanagh*	Democrat	
New York	4th	John J. Blair	Democrat	
New York	5th	Peter Mitchell*	Democrat	
New York	6th	Timothy J. Campbell*	Democrat	
New York	7th	John Carey	Democrat	
New York	8th	Martin Nachtmann*	Democrat	
New York	9th	William G. Bergen*	Democrat	
New York	10th	Owen Murphy	Democrat	
New York	11th	John H. White	Republican	
New York	12th	William W. Cook	Democrat	
New York	13th	Richard Flanagan	Democrat	
New York	14th	John R. Hennessey	Democrat	
New York	15th	Alexander Frear*	Democrat	
New York	16th	James Irving*	Democrat	
New York	17th	George W. Plunkitt*	Democrat	
New York	18th	Lawrence D. Kiernan*	Democrat	
New York	19th	Thomas C. Fields	Democrat	
New York	20th	John Brown	Democrat	
New York	21st	William Hitchman*	Democrat	elected Speaker
Niagara	1st	Lewis S. Payne	Democrat	
Niagara	2nd	Lee R. Sanborn	Republican	
Oneida	1st	Samuel S. Lowery	Republican	
Oneida	2nd	David Morse Miner	Republican	
Oneida	3rd	St. Pierre Jerred	Democrat	
Oneida	4th	James Roberts	Republican	
Onondaga	1st	Thomas G. Alvord	Republican	
Onondaga	2nd	Nathan R. Tefft	Republican	
Onondaga	3rd	Gustavus Sniper	Republican	
Ontario	1st	Henry Ray*	Republican	
Ontario	2nd	David E. Wilson	Republican	
Orange	1st	Odell S. Hathaway	Democrat	
Orange	2nd	Thomas J. Lyon*	Democrat	
Orleans		John Berry	Republican	
Oswego	1st	DeWitt C. Littlejohn	Republican	
Oswego	2nd	Abraham Howe	Democrat	
Oswego	3rd	John Parker	Republican	
Otsego	1st	James Young	Democrat	
Otsego	2nd	William W. Snow	Democrat	
Putnam		Morgan Horton*	Democrat	
Queens	1st	James B. Pearsall*	Democrat	
Queens	2nd	Francis B. Baldwin	Democrat	
Rensselaer	1st	John L. Flagg*	Democrat	
Rensselaer	2nd	Eugene Hyatt	Republican	
Rensselaer	3rd	J. Thomas Davis	Republican	unsuccessfully contested by F. S. Fairchild
Richmond		John Decker	Democrat	
Rockland		James M. Nelson	Democrat	
St. Lawrence	1st	George M. Gleason*	Republican	
St. Lawrence	2nd	Julius M. Palmer*	Republican	
St. Lawrence	3rd	William Bradford	Republican	
Saratoga	1st	Isaiah Fuller	Democrat	
Saratoga	2nd	Seymour Ainsworth	Democrat	
Schenectady		Gershom Banker	Democrat	
Schoharie		Silas Sweet	Democrat	
Schuyler		William C. Coon	Democrat	
Seneca		Robert R. Steele	Democrat	
Steuben	1st	James G. Bennett	Democrat	
Steuben	2nd	John Davis	Democrat	
Suffolk		Brinley D. Sleight	Democrat	
Sullivan		James L. La Moree*	Democrat	
Tioga		John H. Deming	Republican	
Tompkins		John H. Selkreg*	Republican	
Ulster	1st	Patrick J. Flynn*	Democrat	
Ulster	2nd	Abraham E. Hasbrouck*	Democrat	
Ulster	3rd	Charles H. Krack	Democrat	
Warren		Godfrey R. Martine	Democrat	
Washington	1st	Thomas Stevenson	Republican	
Washington	2nd	Isaac V. Baker Jr.*	Republican	
Wayne	1st	Anson S. Wood	Republican	unsuccessfully contested by Eran N. Thomas
Wayne	2nd	Amasa Hall	Republican	
Westchester	1st	James J. Mooney	Democrat	
Westchester	2nd	Edward D. Lawrence*	Democrat	unsuccessfully contested by Howard C. Cady
Westchester	3rd	James W. Husted*	Republican	
Wyoming		Marcus A. Hull*	Republican	
Yates		William T. Remer	Republican	

=== Employees ===
- Clerk: Cornelius W. Armstrong
- Sergeant-at-Arms: Jeriah G. Rhoads
- Doorkeeper: James C. Pierce
- First Assistant Doorkeeper: M. W. Wall
- Second Assistant Doorkeeper: Hugh Ryan
- Stenographer: George Wakeman

== Sources ==
- The New York Civil List compiled by Franklin Benjamin Hough, Stephen C. Hutchins and Edgar Albert Werner (1870; see pg. 439 for Senate districts; pg. 444 for senators; pg. 450–463 for Assembly districts; pg. 512f for assemblymen)
- Journal of the Senate (93rd Session) (1870)
- Journal of the Assembly (93rd Session) (1870; Vol. I)
- Life Sketches of Executive Officers, and Members of the Legislature of the State of New York, Vol. III by H. H. Boone & Theodore P. Cook (1870)
