= Benjamin Ray =

American politician

Benjamin Ray (born 1819 Hudson, Columbia County, New York) was an American politician from New York.

== Life ==
He was the son of Capt. Samuel Ray. He began work as a boater on the Hudson River. In 1835, he went to New York City, learned the trade of a blacksmith, and worked for a boiler and boat building company. In 1849, he went to California.

In 1853, he returned to New York City, and was a member of the New York State Assembly (New York Co., 2nd D.) in 1856. Some time later he returned to Hudson.

He was again a member of the State Assembly (Columbia Co., 1st D.) in 1871, 1872 and 1873; and was a member of the New York State Senate (11th D.) in 1874 and 1875.

In 1888, Ray crossed party lines to endorse Republican candidates Benjamin Harrison and Levi P. Morton for President and Vice President.

== Sources ==
- Life Sketches of Government Officers and Members of the Legislature of the State of New York in 1875 by W. H. McElroy and Alexander McBride (pg. 95ff) [e-book]

New York State Assembly
Preceded by Robert B. Coleman	New York State Assembly; New York County, 2nd District; 1856	Succeeded by Thomas Kivlen
Preceded by Edward Sturges	New York State Assembly; Columbia County, 1st District; 1871–1873	Succeeded by Henry Lawrence
New York State Senate
Preceded by Abiah W. Palmer	New York State Senate; 11th District; 1874–1875	Succeeded by B. Platt Carpenter
