= William M. Graham (politician) =

American politician

William M. Graham (September 8, 1819 Minisink, Orange County, New York – November 13, 1886 Middletown, Orange Co., NY) was an American banker and Democratic politician from New York.

== Life ==
In 1841, he began to work for the Middletown Bank, first as Teller, and from 1844 on as Cashier. He was Treasurer of Orange County from 1855 to 1860. In 1860, he became President of the Wallkill Bank, later the Wallkill National Bank.

He was a member of the New York State Senate (10th D.) from 1868 to 1871, sitting in the 91st, 92nd, 93rd and 94th New York State Legislatures.

In 1872, the Wallkill National Bank went bankrupt. An investigation showed that $256,000 of the bank's funds and more than $100,000 worth of securities deposited in the bank were missing, the money having been "dissipated in Wall Street" by Graham and Cashier Charles H. Horton. (In total, the cash and securities were worth over nine million dollars in current money.) Horton fled to Europe, but Graham was convicted of fraud and embezzlement, and sentenced to ten years imprisonment at hard labor. He served about four years in Clinton State Prison and was pardoned by President Rutherford B. Hayes in 1877. Afterwards he worked as an attendant at the Middletown State Homeopathic Hospital.

In the spring of 1886, Graham attempted a political comeback when he was the Democratic candidate for Justice of the Peace, losing by a narrow margin. In November of that year, however, Graham died of Bright's disease.

== Sources ==
- The New York Civil List compiled by Franklin Benjamin Hough, Stephen C. Hutchins and Edgar Albert Werner (1870; pg. 444 and 555)
- Life Sketches of the State Officers, Senators, and Members of the Assembly of the State of New York in 1868 by S. R. Harlow & S. C. Hutchins (pg. 87f)
- TWEED AND GRAHAM in NYT on May 23, 1877
- A CHECKERED CAREER ENDED in NYT on November 15, 1886

New York State Senate
Preceded by George Chambers	New York State Senate; 10th District; 1868–1871	Succeeded by Edward M. Madden
