= Charles N. Flenagin =

American lawyer and politician (1839–1881)

Charles N. Flenagin (September 30, 1839 – April 30, 1881) was an American lawyer and politician from Allegany County, New York.

== Life ==
Flenagin was born on September 30, 1839, in Hume, New York, the son of James Flenagin and Julia A. Perkins.

Flenagin attended the Genesee Conference Seminary in Pike. In 1860, he began studying law in the office of E. E. Harding of Hume. He began practicing law on his own in 1864. He served as Clerk and Justice of the Peace of Hume, Hume's representative in the Board of Supervisors for two terms, and Attorney for the Board of Excise of Allegany County. In 1869, he was elected to the New York State Assembly as a Republican, representing Allegany County. He served in the Assembly in 1870 and 1871. In 1874, he moved to Angelica and was elected District Attorney. He was reelected to that office in 1877. He spent years in the Angelica law firm Richardson, Flenagin and Smith. He was elected Town Supervisor of Angelica in 1880, and he was reelected to that office the year he died.

Flenagin was Vice President of the First National Bank of Angelica, its confidential attorney, and at the time of his death its attorney in the settlement of several large estates. In 1865, he married Elizabeth Jane Abbott of Pike. Their only child died in infancy.

Flenagin died at his home from heart disease on April 30, 1881. He was buried in the cemetery in Angelica.

New York State Assembly
Preceded by Silas Richardson	New York State Assembly; Allegany County; 1870–1871	Succeeded by William W. Crandall
