= William F. Scoresby =

American politician

William Frederick Scoresby (January 2, 1840 Fallsburg, Sullivan County, New York – 1884) was an American medical doctor and politician from New York.

== Life ==
He was the son of Thomas Scoresby MD (1804–1866) and Louisa (Richardson) Scoresby (1804–1875). The couple emigrated to the United States in 1834, settling first in Port Jervis, New York, then in Fallsburgh. In 1840, the family removed to Ellenville. William studied medicine with his father, graduated from the College of Physicians and Surgeons in New York City in 1864, and practiced medicine in Ellenville. On January 29, 1867, he married Marilda S. "Lillie" Ernhout (1842–1867) who died suddenly eight months later while he was in England.

He entered politics as a Republican. He was a Trustee of Ellenville from 1869 to 1879, and President of the Village of Ellenville for one term. In 1872, he joined the Liberal Republicans, and was a delegate to the Liberal Republican state convention. He was nominated by this party for the seat in the New York State Senate (14th D.) vacated by the death of Jacob Hardenbergh. His nomination was endorsed by the Democrats, and he was elected by a majority of 9 votes. He took his seat in the 95th New York State Legislature on November 22, 1872, during the special session called for the trial of the corrupt judges; and sat in the 96th New York State Legislature in 1873.

On May 24, 1877, he married Grace A. Rayner. As a Democrat, he was Supervisor of the Town of Wawarsing in 1877 and 1878.

He was buried at the Fantinekill Cemetery in Ellenville.

English scientist and divine William Scoresby DD (1789–1857) was his uncle.

== Sources ==
- Life Sketches of Executive Officers and Members of the Legislature of the State of New York by William H. McElroy & Alexander McBride (1873; pg. 101ff) [e-book]
- Bio at Old Bios
- THE STATE SENATE in NYT on November 23, 1872

New York State Senate
| Preceded by Jacob Hardenbergh | New York State Senate; 14th District; 1872–1873 | Succeeded by Henry C. Connelly |
