= Michael Norton (politician) =

American politician

Michael Norton (December 25, 1837 in County Roscommon, Ireland – April 23, 1889 in New York City) was an American politician from New York.

== Life ==
The family emigrated to New York City when Michael was still an infant. he began to work when eight years old, first in a crockery factory, then in a sugar refinery. At age 16, he became a mess boy aboard the steamer Atlantic of the Collins Line. After six trips across the Atlantic Ocean, he abandoned the maritime service, and became a cooper instead.

He fought in the American Civil War as a captain of volunteers from May to November 1861, when he resigned his commission to take care of the family after his father's death. He was an Alderman of New York (3rd D.) from 1865 to 1870.

He was a Democratic member of the New York State Senate (5th D.) from 1868 to 1871, sitting in the 91st, 92nd, 93rd and 94th New York State Legislatures. He was a member of the Tweed Ring, and was admitted to the bar without studying law. During his second senatorial term, he left the Ring and joined the Young Democracy (an Anti-Tweed faction of Tammany Hall. He was a member of the New York State Assembly (New York Co., 5th D.) in 1873.

Later he joined Irving Hall and the County Democracy, both Anti-Tammany organizations affiliated with the Democratic Party. He was Civil Justice of the First District from 1882 until his death.

== Sources ==
- The New York Civil List compiled by Franklin Benjamin Hough, Stephen C. Hutchins and Edgar Albert Werner (1870; pg. 444)
- Life Sketches of the State Officers, Senators, and Members of the Assembly of the State of New York in 1868 by S. R. Harlow & S. C. Hutchins (pg. 123ff)
- Manual of the Corporation of New York by Joseph Shannon (1869; pg. 618)
- MICHAEL NORTON DEAD in NYT on April 24, 1889

New York State Senate
Preceded by Charles G. Cornell	New York State Senate; 5th District; 1868–1871	Succeeded by Erastus C. Benedict
New York State Assembly
Preceded by David S. Paige	New York State Assembly; New York County, 5th District; 1873	Succeeded by ?
