= Willis E. Benedict =

American politician

Willis E. Benedict (July 16, 1858 – August 17, 1917) was a member of the South Dakota Senate and the South Dakota House of Representatives.

He was born in Lafayette County, Wisconsin. He moved to Lincoln County, South Dakota in 1872. On August 12, 1899, Benedict married Maude Ionia Druse. They had one daughter. Benedict is buried in Canton, South Dakota.

== Career ==
Benedict was a member of the Senate from 1899 to 1900 and of the House of Representatives from 1901 to 1902. He was a Republican.
