= Abiah W. Palmer =

American politician

Abiah W. Palmer (January 25, 1835 – January 10, 1881) was an American politician from New York. In 1864, he became the first President of the First National Bank of Amenia. He served member of the New York State Assembly in 1860 and 1866. In 1866, Palmer was appointed Chairman of the Board of Commissioners for the Hudson River State Hospital for the Insane. He also served as a member of the New York State Senate in 1868, 1869, 1872 and 1873.

== Early life and education ==
Palmer was born on January 25, 1835 in Amenia, Dutchess County, New York, the son of Capt. Abiah Palmer. He attended Amenia Seminary, and Oneida Conference Seminary in Cazenovia. Then he entered Union College, but due to ill health left in 1856 without graduating. He spent several months taking the "water cure" at Clifton Springs, and then travelled for two years about Europe.

== Career ==
In 1859, Palmer returned to his homestead in Amenia, and engaged in farming and the mining of iron ore. In 1864, he became the first President of the First National Bank of Amenia.

He was a member of the New York State Assembly (Dutchess Co., 1st D.) in 1860 and 1866. In 1866, Palmer was appointed by Gov. Reuben E. Fenton as Chairman of the Board of Commissioners in charge to select a site to establish the Hudson River State Hospital for the Insane. He was a member of the New York State Senate (11th D.) in 1868, 1869, 1872 and 1873.

At the 1870 New York state election, Palmer ran on the Republican ticket for New York State Comptroller, but was defeated by the incumbent Democrat Asher P. Nichols.

== Death ==
Afterwards, to improve his health, Palmer went to live in Colorado Springs, where he died in 1881. He was buried at the Amenia Island Cemetery.

== Personal life ==
In July 1870, Palmer married Jeannette Yeamans (1851–1921), and they had two children.

New York State Assembly
Preceded by James Mackin	New York State Assembly; Dutchess County, 1st District; 1860	Succeeded by John B. Dutcher
Preceded by James Howard	New York State Assembly; Dutchess County, 1st District; 1866	Succeeded by Augustus A. Brush
New York State Senate
Preceded by Edward G. Wilbor	New York State Senate; 11th District; 1868–1869	Succeeded by George Morgan
Preceded by George Morgan	New York State Senate; 11th District; 1872–1873	Succeeded by Benjamin Ray
