= Loran L. Lewis =

American politician

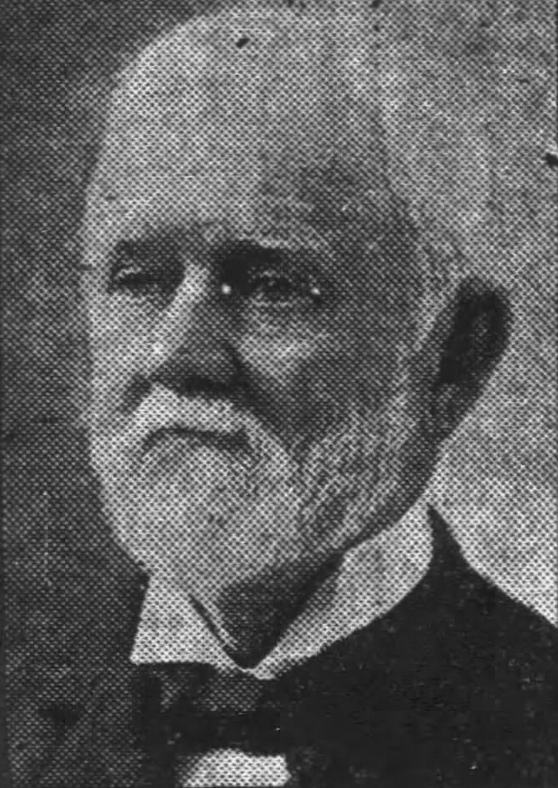

Justice of the New York Supreme Court
- In office 1883–1895

Member of the New York State Senate
- In office 1870–1873
- Preceded by: Asher P. Nichols
- Succeeded by: John Ganson
- Constituency: 31st District

Personal details
- Born: Loran Ludowick Lewis; May 9, 1825 Mentz, New York
- Died: March 8, 1916 (aged 90) Buffalo, New York
- Party: Republican
- Spouse: Charlotte E. Pierson (m. 1852)
- Children: 4
- Occupation: Lawyer, politician

Loran Ludowick Lewis (May 9, 1825 – March 8, 1916) was an American lawyer and politician from New York.

== Life ==
Loran L. Lewis was born in Mentz, New York on May 9, 1825, the son of John C. Lewis and Delecta (Barbour) Lewis. He studied law in Auburn, was admitted to the bar in 1848, and commenced practice in Buffalo. On June 1, 1852, he married Charlotte E. Pierson, and they had four children.

He was a member of the New York State Senate (31st D.) from 1870 to 1873, sitting in the 93rd, 94th, 95th and 96th New York State Legislatures.

He was a justice of the New York Supreme Court (8th D.) from 1883 to 1895 when he reached the constitutional age limit. In 1901, he was appointed by the court, with Robert C. Titus, to defend Leon Czolgosz at his trial for the assassination of William McKinley, although because Czolgosz did not cooperate with his attorneys, the prosecution easily won the trial and Czolgosz was sentenced to death.

Lewis died from pneumonia at his home in Buffalo on March 8, 1916.

Temperance and physical culture advocate Diocletian Lewis (1823–1886) was his brother.

New York State Senate
Preceded by Asher P. Nichols	New York State Senate; 31st District; 1870–1873	Succeeded by John Ganson
