= Theodore L. Minier =

American politician

Theodore Loomis Minier (December 16, 1819 Ulster Township, Pennsylvania – August 27, 1895 Elmira, New York) was an American politician from New York.

== Life ==
He was the son of John Minier and Rachel Minier. He attended the common schools and Athens Academy. In 1838, he removed to Horseheads, in Chemung County, New York. He was Deputy Collector of canal tolls there from 1839 to 1841. In 1842, he became a teller in the Chemung Canal Bank. Then he became Principal Agent of the Erie Railroad in Elmira, was private secretary of Erie Railroad President Benjamin Loder, and was then hired by Alexander S. Diven to take charge of his railroad business.

On May 25, 1848, Minier married Sarah Vail Maxwell, and they had three children. In 1854, he became Cashier of the Bank of Havana, in Schuyler County. After the death of Charles Cook in 1866, Minier took charge of the bank's operations.

He was a member of the New York State Senate (26th D.) in 1870 and 1871. In 1876, he returned to Elmira, and was later an Alderman for three terms.

He was buried at the Woodlawn Cemetery in Elmira.

== Sources ==
- The New York Civil List compiled by Franklin Benjamin Hough, Stephen C. Hutchins and Edgar Albert Werner (1870; pg. 444)
- Life Sketches of Executive Officers, and Members of the Legislature of the State of New York, Vol. III by H. H. Boone & Theodore P. Cook (1870; pg. 98ff)

New York State Senate
Preceded by John I. Nicks	New York State Senate; 27th District; 1870–1871	Succeeded by Gabriel T. Harrower
