= Erastus C. Benedict =

American politician

Erastus Cornelius Benedict (March 19, 1800 – October 22, 1880) was an American lawyer and politician from New York. He served in the New York Assembly and New York Senate.

== Life ==
He was born on March 19, 1800, in Branford, New Haven County, Connecticut, the son of Rev. Joel Tyler Benedict (1772–1833) and Currance (Wheeler) Benedict (1772–1862). He attended the common schools, and then taught school. He graduated from Williams College in 1821. Then he taught school again, and studied law. He was admitted to the bar in 1824, and practiced in New York City. On May 7, 1833, he married Caroline Margaret Bloodgood (1809–1886), and they had two children.

He was an Assistant Alderman (15th Ward) of New York City in 1841; a member of the New York State Assembly (New York Co., 13th D.) in 1848; a member of the New York City Board of Education from 1850 to 1863; and a Regent of the University of the State of New York from 1855 until his death.

He was again a member of the State Assembly (New York Co., 7th D.) in 1864; and a member of the New York State Senate (5th D.) in 1872 and 1873.

After the death of John V. L. Pruyn, Benedict was elected Chancellor of USNY in January 1878.

He died on October 22, 1880, in New York City; and was buried at the Green-Wood Cemetery in Brooklyn.

His niece, Margaret Bloodgood Peeke, was an author.

== Sources ==
- Life Sketches of Executive Officers and Members of the Legislature of the State of New York by William H. McElroy & Alexander McBride (1873; pg. 57ff) [e-book]
- Manual of the Corporation of New York by Joseph Shannon (1869; pg. 592)

New York State Assembly
| Preceded by new district | New York State Assembly; New York County, 13th District; 1848 | Succeeded by Joseph B. Varnum Jr. |
| Preceded by Vincent C. King | New York State Assembly; New York County, 7th District; 1864 | Succeeded by Thomas E. Stewart |
New York State Senate
| Preceded by Michael Norton | New York State Senate; 5th District; 1872–1873 | Succeeded by James W. Booth |
Academic offices
| Preceded by John V. L. Pruyn | Chancellor of the University of the State of New York; 1878-1880 | Succeeded by Henry R. Pierson |
