= Gabriel T. Harrower =

American politician

Gabriel T. Harrower (September 25, 1816 – August 15, 1895) was an American politician from New York.

== Life ==
Harrower was born on September 25, 1816, in Guilford, New York. He was the son of Benjamin Harrower. The family removed to Lindley when Gabriel was still a child. He attended the common schools and Geneva Lyceum. Then he engaged in farming and the lumber business.

He joined the Free Soil Party in 1848, and the Republican Party upon its foundation. He was Sheriff of Steuben County from 1853 to 1855; and Supervisor of the Town of Lindley. On November 5, 1859, he married Helen Parkhurst (1837–1911), and they had several children.

During the American Civil War, Harrower commanded the 161st New York Volunteer Infantry Regiment, fighting in the Department of the Gulf, and taking part in the siege of Port Hudson.

He was a member of the New York State Senate (27th D.) in 1872 and 1873. In 1872, he joined the Liberal Republican Party and supported Horace Greeley for President.

Harrower died on August 15, 1895, in Lawrenceville, Pennsylvania. He was buried at the Cemetery in Lawrenceville.

New York State Senate
Preceded by Theodore L. Minier	New York State Senate; 27th District; 1872–1873	Succeeded by George B. Bradley
