= William Johnson (politician, born 1821) =

American politician

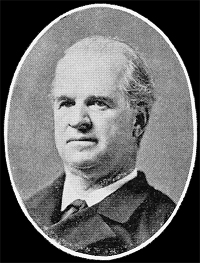
- William Johnson
- Born: December 8, 1821; Williamstown, Massachusetts, United States
- Died: October 11, 1875 (aged 53); Seneca Falls, New York, United States
- Military career
- Allegiance: United States of America; Union
- Branch: United States Army; Union Army
- Service years: 1862–1863
- Rank: Colonel
- Commands: 148th Regiment
- Other work: New York State Senator, 26th District, Democrat, 1871 – 1875.

William Johnson (December 8, 1821 – October 10, 1875) was a New York State businessman and politician.

== Early life and entry into politics ==
William Johnson was born on December 8, 1821, in Williamstown, Massachusetts, to David Johnson and Olive (Stodard) Johnson. The family removed to Frankfort, New York, where David died in 1825. At 14, William began studies in mechanics, and without completing a degree he began work as a contractor on public works projects.

It was his work on the New York State Canal System from 1849 through 1856 that brought him to Seneca Falls, New York. There he married in the summer of 1855 Angeline Chamberlain (died 1901), daughter of Congressman Jacob P. Chamberlain. The couple had five sons, the last surviving of whom was Charles Chamberlain Johnson. The Johnson residence still stands on Cayuga Street in Seneca Falls, and is being developed into condominiums after years as a home for women.

In 1859, Johnson entered into the manufacture of knit goods. He was a Democratic member of the New York State Assembly (Seneca Co.) in 1861, and was a member of the Canals Committee and the Commerce and Navigation Committee.

== Civil War ==
When the American Civil War began, he was appointed by Governor Edwin D. Morgan as Seneca County representative to the War Committee, responsible for procuring troops and supplies. In 1862, he assembled 1200 men at Camp Swift in Geneva, New York. He was appointed Colonel and led the 148th Regiment into the war. He resigned his commission and returned to New York in late 1863, citing ill health, but continued to support the Union cause at home.

In the years following his Army service, Johnson became a contractor for railroad construction.

== New York State Senate ==
He was a member of the New York State Senate (26th D.) from 1872 to 1875, sitting in the 95th, 96th, 97th and 98th New York State Legislatures.

He was elected to the New York State Senate in the fall of 1871, as a Democrat representing the 26th District, then comprising Ontario, Seneca, and Yates counties. He was elected with a vote majority cited between 950 and 1500 in a primarily Republican district. He became a member of the standing committees on Canals, Manufactures, and Grievances.

During this first senate term, then-State Senator William M. Tweed was embroiled in his corruption and embezzlement scandal. As Chairman of the Special Committee investigating Tweed in the State Senate, Johnson went to meet with Tweed, who declared himself too sick to speak with the Senator. Being charged with only 30 days in which to act on the matter, Johnson used what he viewed as Republican attempts at interference as leverage to aid in the passage of his bill for the creation of an investigatory panel. "Boss Tweed" was convicted in 1873.

Johnson was re-elected to the State Senate by a margin of less than 200 votes. During his second term as a State Senator, he was a member of the committees on Canals, Manufactures, and Militia.

On October 11, 1875, Johnson returned to Seneca Falls after having been in New York City. He fell ill that afternoon and died hours later of unreported causes.

== Personality ==
Johnson was remembered as being kind, personable, and frank. As a State Senator he was regarded as being well-versed in many subjects as well as a deft conversationalist. He was known as a jovial man, with a sharp wit and strong sense of irony.

New York State Assembly
Preceded by John C. Hall	New York State Assembly; Seneca County; 1861	Succeeded by Peter J. Van Vleet
New York State Senate
Preceded by Abraham V. Harpending	New York State Senate; 26th District; 1872–1875	Succeeded by Stephen H. Hammond
