= Samuel Ames =

American politician

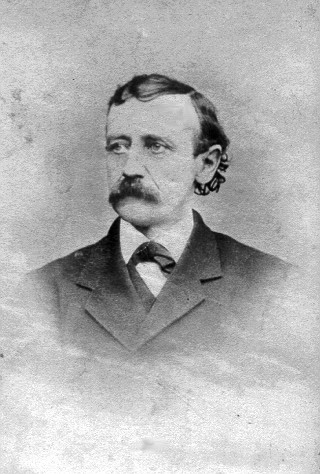

Samuel Ames (June 29, 1824, in Champlain, Clinton County, New York – July 4, 1875, in Keeseville, Essex County, New York) was an American lawyer, banker, and politician from New York.

== Life ==
He was the son of Charles Ames. He attended Champlain Academy and Keeseville Academy. Then he studied law with George A. Simmons, was admitted to the bar in 1847, and commenced practice in partnership with Simmons in Keeseville. In 1849, he married Elizabeth Thompson (c.1825–1898), and they had three children. In 1860, he succeeded his father-in-law as Cashier of the Essex County Bank. In 1870, he became a director of the Keeseville and Montreal Railroad. In 1871, he became Cashier of the Keeseville Bank.

He entered politics as a Whig and joined the Republican Party upon its foundation. He was a member of the New York State Senate (16th D.) in 1872 and 187, but missed most of both sessions due to ill health.

He was buried at the Evergreen Cemetery in Keeseville.

== Sources ==
- Life Sketches of Executive Officers and Members of the Legislature of the State of New York by William H. McElroy & Alexander McBride (1873; pg. 53f) [e-book]
- Evergreen Cemetery transcriptions at RootsWeb
- Bio transcribed from History of Essex County (1885)
- OBITUARY; HON. SAMUEL AMES in NYT on July 6, 1875

New York State Senate
Preceded by Christopher F. Norton	New York State Senate; 16th District; 1872–1873	Succeeded by Franklin W. Tobey
