= William Lewis (New York politician) =

American politician

William Lewis (October 31, 1827, in Scotland – December 11, 1891, in Hamden, New York) was an American merchant and politician from New York.

== Life ==
The family emigrated to the United States in 1834, and settled on a farm in Delaware County, New York. He attended the common schools, and then became a merchant in Hamden at the age of 23. He married Janette Neish. Later he was also a contractor, and built about 20 miles of the New York and Oswego Midland Railroad in 1870 and 1871.

He was a Republican member of the New York State Assembly (Delaware Co., 1st D.) in 1872 and 1873; Supervisor of the Town of Hamden from 1875 to 1883; Chairman of the Board of Supervisors of Delaware County in 1877 and 1878; again a member of the State Assembly (Delaware Co.) in 1881; and a member of the New York State Senate (24th D.) in 1888 and 1889.

Lewis died in his home in Hamden at the age of 64.

== Sources ==
- The New York Red Book compiled by Edgar L. Murlin (published by James B. Lyon, Albany NY, 1897; pg. 403, 493f and 500)
- Life Sketches of Executive Officers and Members of the Legislature of the State of New York by William H. McElroy & Alexander McBride (1873; pg. 245f)
- Biographical sketches of the members of the Legislature in The Evening Journal Almanac (1888)
- The History of Delaware County ("The Town of Hamden")

New York State Assembly
Preceded by Alpheus Bolt	New York State Assembly; Delaware County, 1st District; 1872–1873	Succeeded by Benjamin J. Bassett
Preceded by Robert Beates	New York State Assembly; Delaware County; 1881	Succeeded by Chester H. Treadwell
New York State Senate
Preceded by Matthew W. Marvin	New York State Senate; 24th District; 1888–1889	Succeeded by Edmund O'Connor
