= Henry R. Pierson =

American politician

Henry Rufus Pierson
- Born: June 13, 1819; Charleston, Montgomery County, New York
- Died: January 1, 1890 (aged 70); Albany, New York
- Resting place: Green-Wood Cemetery

Henry Rufus Pierson (June 13, 1819 – January 1, 1890) was an American lawyer and politician from New York.

== Life ==
Pierson graduated from Union College in 1846. Then he studied law, first in Cherry Valley, then in New York City, was admitted to the bar in 1848, and practiced. In 1849, he moved to Brooklyn. He was an alderman (3rd Ward) of Brooklyn from 1858 to 1860, and was president of the Board of Aldermen. He was president of the Brooklyn City Railroad from 1860 to 1869.

He was a member of the New York State Senate (2nd D.) in 1866 and 1867. In 1869, he went to Chicago as Financial Agent of the North Western Railroad, and was the company's vice president for two years.

In 1872, he moved to Albany, and was a member of the New York State Assembly (Albany Co., 2nd D.) in 1873. He was elected a regent of the University of the State of New York, and was vice chancellor from 1878 to 1881, and chancellor from 1881 until his death.

Pierson died from the Russian flu at his home in Albany, and was buried at the Green-Wood Cemetery in Brooklyn.

== Sources ==
- The New York Civil List compiled by Franklin Benjamin Hough, Stephen C. Hutchins and Edgar Albert Werner (1870; pg. 444)
- Life Sketches of the State Officers, Senators, and Members of the Assembly of the State of New York, in 1867 by S. R. Harlow & H. H. Boone (pg. 135ff)

New York State Senate
Preceded by Demas Strong	New York State Senate; 2nd District; 1866–1867	Succeeded by James F. Pierce
New York State Assembly
Preceded by Henry Smith	New York State Assembly; Albany County, 2nd District; 1873	Succeeded by Leopold C. G. Kshinka
Academic offices
Preceded by Erastus C. Benedict	Chancellor of the University of the State of New York; 1881–1890	Succeeded by George William Curtis
