= Peter Couchman =

Australian television presenter and journalist

- Born: 1941 (age 84–85)
- Occupations: Television presenter; radio presenter; author; journalist
- Years active: 1965–present
- Employer: Australian Broadcasting Corporation
- Television: This Day Tonight; Four Corners

Peter Couchman (born 1941) is an Australian journalist, author and presenter. He had a long career with the Australian Broadcasting Commission, working on current affairs programs including This Day Tonight and Four Corners.

== Career ==
Couchman studied at the National Institute of Dramatic Art and worked for two years as an actor with the Young Elizabethan Players. Once he decided he wanted to be a reporter, he joined the ABC, starting in their Sydney mailroom.

Couchman worked on This Day Tonight, the ABC's evening current affairs program in the 1960s and 1970s. In 1973, he was Singapore correspondent for the ABC. Couchman travelled to Cambodia in May 1973 with cameraman David Brill to report for Four Corners on the ultimately successful campaign of the Khmer Rouge. He was detained while reporting in the Philippines in 1973 during a period of martial law imposed by President Ferdinand Marcos.

He was a reporter for Four Corners for three terms: 1968–1969, 1974–1975 and 1987–1989.

He was the host of the Victorian edition of This Day Tonight during the 1970s.

In 1978, he moved to Network Ten, hosting The Peter Couchman Show, a daytime talk show and the late-night Peter Couchman Tonight. In August 1979, he moved to a prime-time slot with magazine program Peter Couchman's Melbourne.

In 1980, Couchman presented an afternoon radio program on 3AW. In 1981, he returned to the ABC as compere of Nationwide. There was a contractual dispute between 3AW and the ABC, with 3AW believing that they had an agreement to renew Couchman's contract for 1981. The Supreme Court found for the ABC.

When the ABC revamped its news and current affairs with a new program, The National, in 1985, Couchman was appointed Asian correspondent, based once more in Singapore.

In 1986, Couchman wrote, produced and presented an ABC news special, Coup D'Etat, a world exclusive following the political crisis in the Philippines, the end of Marcos's regime and the swearing in of new president Corazon Aquino. The program won a 1987 Logie Award for Most Outstanding Achievement in Public Affairs.

Couchman turned down an offer to present Seven Network's Holiday to return to Four Corners in 1987.

From 1989 to 1992, he hosted the eponymous Couchman forum program with a similar format to Robert Moore's Monday Conference (1971–1978) and the current Q&A.

In January 1994 he hosted the ABC's The 7.30 Report in Sydney. In November that year, Couchman was arrested during the "Save Albert Park" protests against the Australian Grand Prix being run at Albert Park in Melbourne. He was released without charge.

From 1995 to 1997, Couchman hosted the morning slot on 774 ABC Melbourne radio, formerly known as 3LO, taking over from Ranald Macdonald. He had a combative relationship with the Victorian premier, Jeff Kennett, who was a regular guest on the program.

Couchman now works on the speakers circuit as an MC and moderator.

== Notable work ==
- This Day Tonight: 50-cent coins. Report by Peter Couchman for TDT in 1968. At that time the fifty-cent coin contained 58 cents' worth of silver.
- Interview with Graham Kennedy on TDT in 1970.
- Peter Couchman Show 1978 Guest appearances by Denise Drysdale and Margo Lee.
- Interview with former PM Malcolm Fraser circa 1984.
- Nationwide April Fools joke.
- Coup D'Etat: The Philippines Revolt (Youtube)
- Transcript of interview with Prime Minister Paul Keating, 5 October 1995.
- Disasters - ABC reporting on disasters including Peter Couchman reporting on the 1994 Sydney bushfires.

== Personal life ==
Peter Couchman married wife Trish. They had two children, Sophie and Simon.
