= List of elections in 1867 =

The following elections occurred in the year 1867.

== North America ==
=== Canada ===
- 1867 Canadian federal election
- 1867 Nova Scotia general election
- 1867 Ontario general election
- 1867 Quebec general election

=== United States ===
- 1867 New York state election

==== United States Senate ====
- 1867 United States Senate election in California
- 1867 United States Senate election in New York
- 1867 United States Senate election in Pennsylvania
- 1867 United States Senate election in Wisconsin
- 1866 and 1867 United States Senate elections

==== United States House of Representatives ====
- 1867 United States House of Representatives elections in California
- 1866–67 United States House of Representatives elections

==== United States lieutenant gubernatorial ====
- 1867 California lieutenant gubernatorial election
- 1867 Connecticut lieutenant gubernatorial election
- 1867 Minnesota lieutenant gubernatorial election
- 1867 Wisconsin lieutenant gubernatorial election

==== United States gubernatorial ====
- 1867 California gubernatorial election
- 1867 Connecticut gubernatorial election
- 1867 Iowa gubernatorial election
- 1867 Kentucky gubernatorial election
- 1867 Maryland gubernatorial election
- 1867 Massachusetts gubernatorial election
- 1867 Minnesota gubernatorial election
- 1867 New Hampshire gubernatorial election
- 1867 Ohio gubernatorial election
- 1867 Rhode Island gubernatorial election
- 1867 Tennessee gubernatorial election
- 1867 Vermont gubernatorial election
- 1867 Wisconsin gubernatorial election

==== United States mayoral elections ====
- 1867 Boston mayoral election
- 1867 Chicago mayoral election
- 1867 Manchester, New Hampshire, mayoral election
- 1867 New York City mayoral election
- 1867 Worcester, Massachusetts, mayoral election

== Europe ==
- 1867 Belgian general election
- 1867 Dalmatian parliamentary election
- 1867 Faroese general election
- 1867 Italian general election
- 1867 Portuguese legislative election
- 1867 Romanian general election
- 1867 Spanish general election

== Africa ==
- 1867 Liberian general election

== See also ==
- Category:1867 elections
