= List of elections in 1870 =

The following elections occurred in the year 1870.

== North America ==
=== Canada ===
- 1870 Manitoba general election
- 1870 New Brunswick general election

=== United States ===
- 1870 New York state election
- 1870 United States elections

==== United States Senate ====
- 1870 and 1871 United States Senate elections

==== United States House of Representatives ====
- 1870 United States House of Representatives elections
- 1870 United States House of Representatives election in Florida
- 1870 United States House of Representatives elections in South Carolina

==== United States lieutenant gubernatorial ====
- 1870 Connecticut lieutenant gubernatorial election

==== United States gubernatorial ====
- 1870 Alabama gubernatorial election
- 1870 Connecticut gubernatorial election
- 1870 Delaware gubernatorial election
- 1870 Kansas gubernatorial election
- 1870 Maine gubernatorial election
- 1870 Massachusetts gubernatorial election
- 1870 Michigan gubernatorial election
- 1870 Missouri gubernatorial election
- 1870 Nebraska gubernatorial election
- 1870 Nevada gubernatorial election
- 1870 New Hampshire gubernatorial election
- 1870 New York gubernatorial election
- 1870 Oregon gubernatorial election
- 1870 South Carolina gubernatorial election
- 1870 Vermont gubernatorial election
- 1870 West Virginia gubernatorial election

==== United States mayoral elections ====
- 1870 Boston mayoral election
- 1870 Manchester, New Hampshire, mayoral election
- 1870 New York City mayoral election
- 1870 Worcester, Massachusetts, mayoral election

== Europe ==
- August 1870 Belgian general election
- June 1870 Belgian general election
- 1870 Dalmatian parliamentary election
- 1870 French constitutional referendum
- 1870 Italian general election
- 1870 Norwegian parliamentary election
- March 1870 Portuguese legislative election
- September 1870 Portuguese legislative election
- 1870 Serbian parliamentary election

== See also ==
- Category:1870 elections
