= 1869 United States Senate election in New York =

- January 19, 1869

Majority vote of each house needed to win
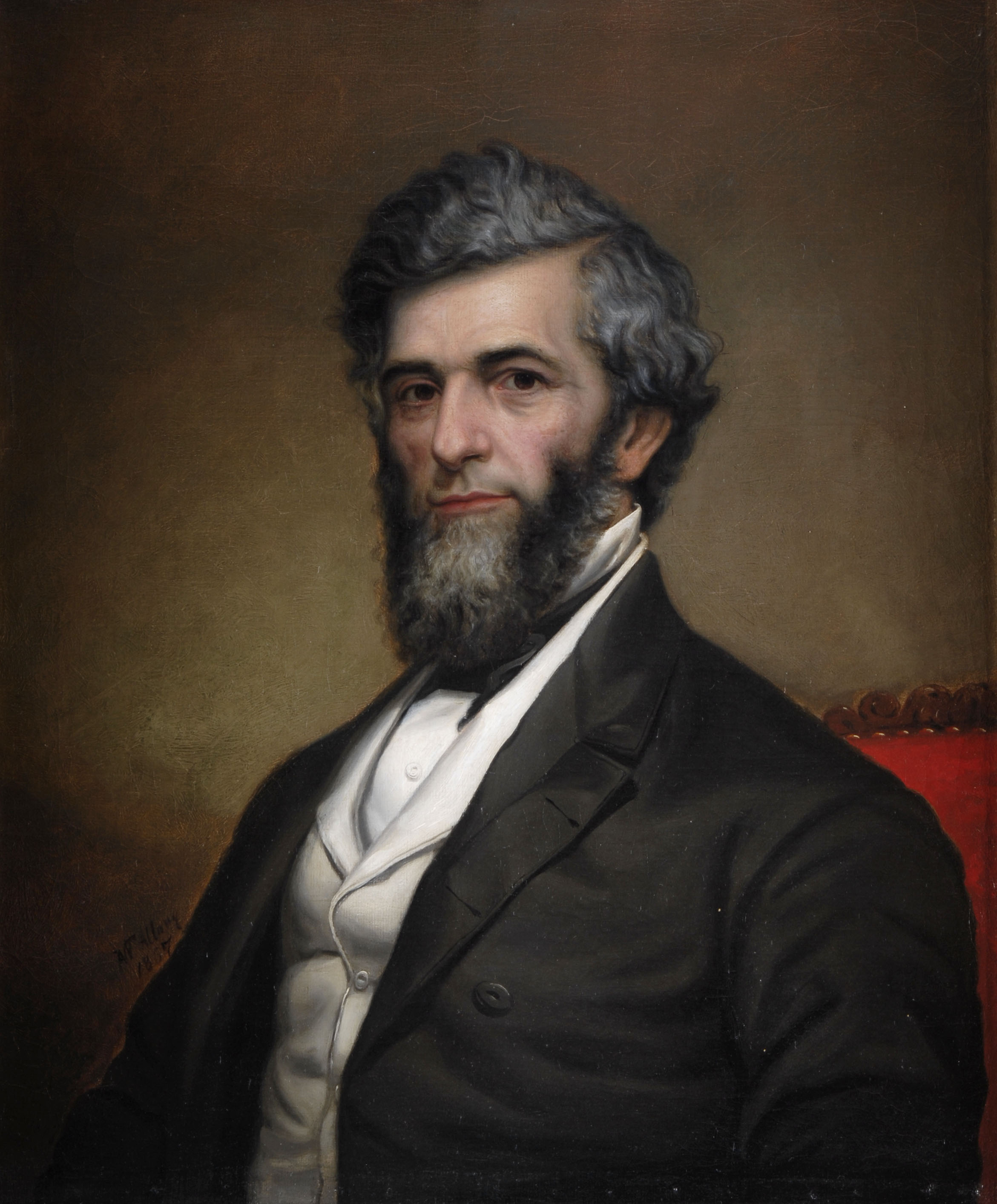

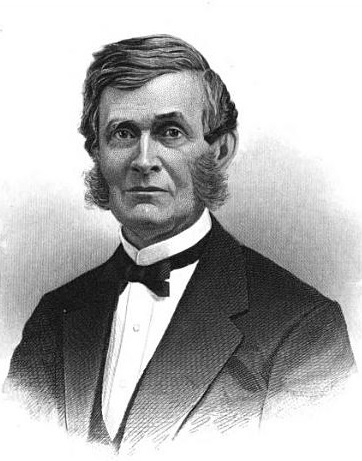
Nominee	Reuben Fenton	Henry Cruse Murphy
Party	Republican	Democratic
Senate	15	10
Percentage	57.69%	38.46%
House	73	46
Percentage	61.34%	38.66%
Senator before election
Edwin D. Morgan
Republican
Elected Senator
Reuben Fenton
Republican

The 1869 United States Senate election in New York was held on January 19, 1869, by the New York State Legislature. Incumbent Senator Edwin D. Morgan stood for a second term in office, but lost the support of the Republican legislative caucus in favor of Reuben Fenton.

== Background ==
Republican Edwin D. Morgan had been elected in February 1863 to this seat, and his term would expire on March 3, 1869.

At the State election in November 1867, 17 Republicans and 15 Democrats were elected for a two-year term (1868–1869) in the State Senate. At the State election in November 1868, Democrat John T. Hoffman was elected Governor, and 75 Republicans and 53 Democrats were elected for the session of 1869 to the Assembly. The 92nd New York State Legislature met from January 5 to May 11, 1869, at Albany, New York.

== Candidates ==
=== Republican caucus ===
The caucus of Republican State legislators met on January 16, Assemblyman John H. Selkreg presided. All 92 legislators were present. They nominated Ex-Governor Reuben E. Fenton for the U.S. Senate. The incumbent U.S. Senator Edwin D. Morgan was very keen on his re-election, but was voted down. Speaker Truman G. Younglove had held back the appointments to the standing Assembly committees until after the caucus, and subsequent election, of a U.S. Senator, and was accused by the Morgan men to have made a bargain to favor the Fenton men with appointments after the election was accomplished. After the caucus, comparing notes, the assemblymen discovered that some of the most important committee chairmanships had been promised to a dozen different members by Speaker Younglove.

1869 Republican caucus for United States Senator result
Candidate	First ballot	Second ballot
Reuben E. Fenton	(50)	52
Edwin D. Morgan	(42)	40
blank	(1)	

Note: On the first ballot, 93 votes were cast, one too many, and it was annulled without announcing the result. The above stated result transpired unofficially. The blank vote caused some debate if the result was really invalidated by it, but it was finally agreed to take a second ballot.

=== Democratic caucus ===
The caucus of the Democratic State legislators met on January 18. State Senator Henry C. Murphy was again nominated, like in 1867.

== Election ==
In the Assembly, Republicans DeWitt C. Hoyt (Saratoga Co.) and James O. Schoonmaker (Ulster Co.); and Democrats James Irving (NYC), Lawrence D. Kiernan (NYC), Harris B. Howard (Rensselaer Co.), James B. Pearsall (Queens), John Tighe (Albany Co.) and Moses Y. Tilden (Columbia Co.); did not vote.

In the State Senate, Republicans Matthew Hale (16th D.) and Charles Stanford (15th D.); and Democrats Cauldwell, Thomas J. Creamer, Michael Norton (5th D.) and John J. Bradley (7th D.); did not vote.

== Result ==
Reuben E. Fenton was the choice of both the Assembly and the State Senate, and was declared elected.

1869 United States Senator election result
House	Republican		Democratic		Democratic	
State Senate (32 members)	Reuben E. Fenton	15	Henry C. Murphy	10	Henry S. Randall	1
State Assembly (128 members)	Reuben E. Fenton	73	Henry C. Murphy	46		

Notes:

- The vote for Ex-Secretary of State Randall was cast by Henry C. Murphy.
- The votes were cast on January 19, but both Houses met in a joint session on January 20 to compare nominations, and declare the result.

== Aftermath ==
Fenton served one term, and remained in office until March 3, 1875.

== Sources ==
- Members of the 41st United States Congress
- Result state election 1867 in The Tribune Almanac for 1868 compiled by Horace Greeley of the New York Tribune
- Result state election 1868 in The Tribune Almanac for 1869 compiled by Horace Greeley of the New York Tribune
- ALBANY.; Caucus of the Republican Members of the Legislature; Reuben E. Fenton Nominated United States Senator in NYT on January 17, 1869
- ALBANY.; Election of United States Senator in NYT on January 20, 1869
- Result State Senate in Journal of the Senate (92nd Session) (1869; pg. 58f)
- Result Assembly in Journal of the Assembly (92nd Session) (1869; Vol. I, pg. 75f)
