= 92nd New York State Legislature =

New York state legislative session

←	91st	93rd	→
- The Old State Capitol (1879)

Overview
- Legislative body: New York State Legislature
- Jurisdiction: New York, United States
- Term: January 1 – December 31, 1869

Senate
- Members: 32
- President: Lt. Gov. Allen C. Beach (D)
- Temporary President: Charles J. Folger (R), from February 4; Richard Crowley (R), on February 24
- Party control: Republican (17-15)

Assembly
- Members: 128
- Speaker: Truman G. Younglove (R)
- Party control: Republican (75-53)

Sessions
- 1st: January 5 – May 11, 1869

The 92nd New York State Legislature, consisting of the New York State Senate and the New York State Assembly, met from January 5 to May 11, 1869, during the first year of John T. Hoffman's governorship, in Albany.

== Background ==
Under the provisions of the New York Constitution of 1846, 32 Senators and 128 assemblymen were elected in single-seat districts; senators for a two-year term, assemblymen for a one-year term. The senatorial districts were made up of entire counties, except New York County (five districts) and Kings County (two districts). The Assembly districts were made up of entire towns, or city wards, forming a contiguous area, all within the same county.

According to the Constitution of 1846, twenty years after its elaboration the electorate was asked if they wanted a Constitutional Convention to be held, which was answered at the 1866 New York state election, in the affirmative. On April 23, 1867, the delegates to the Constitutional Convention were elected, resulting in a Republican majority. On June 4, the Constitutional Convention met at Albany; adjourned on September 23; and met again on November 12. On February 28, 1868, the Constitutional Convention adjourned sine die. How to put the proposed amendments before the electorate was then debated throughout the 91st and the 92nd Legislature, and all amendments, except the re-organization of the judicial system, were eventually rejected by the voters at the 1869 New York state election.

At this time there were two major political parties: the Republican Party and the Democratic Party.

== Elections ==
The 1868 New York state election was held on November 3. Mayor of New York City John T. Hoffman and Allen C. Beach (both Democrats) were elected Governor and Lieutenant Governor. The other three statewide elective offices up for election were also carried by the Democrats. The approximate party strength at this election, as expressed by the vote for Governor, was: Democrats 439,000 and Republicans 411,000.

== Sessions ==
The Legislature met for the regular session at the Old State Capitol in Albany on January 5, 1869; and adjourned on May 11.

Truman G. Younglove (R) was elected Speaker with 71 votes against 52 for William Hitchman (D).

On January 19, the Legislature elected Ex-Governor Reuben E. Fenton (R) to succeed Edwin D. Morgan as U.S. Senator from New York for a six-year term beginning on March 4, 1869.

On February 4, Charles J. Folger (R) was elected president pro tempore of the State Senate "for this session."

On February 24, Richard Crowley (R) was elected president pro tempore of the State Senate "for this day."

On April 29, the Legislature elected Henry Smith (R) as a Metropolitan Police Commissioner, to fill the vacancy caused by the resignation of Thomas C. Acton.

== State Senate ==
=== Districts ===
- 1st District: Queens, Richmond and Suffolk counties
- 2nd District: 1st, 2nd, 3rd, 4th, 5th, 7th, 11th, 13th, 15th, 19th and 20th wards of the City of Brooklyn
- 3rd District: 6th, 8th, 9th, 10th, 12th, 14th, 16th, 17th and 18th wards of the City of Brooklyn; and all towns in Kings County
- 4th District: 1st, 2nd, 3rd, 4th, 5th, 6th, 7th, 13th and 14th wards of New York City
- 5th District: 8th, 9th, 15th and 16th wards of New York City
- 6th District: 10th, 11th and 17th wards of New York City
- 7th District: 18th, 20th and 21st wards of New York City
- 8th District: 12th, 19th and 22nd wards of New York City
- 9th District: Putnam, Rockland and Westchester counties
- 10th District: Orange and Sullivan counties
- 11th District: Columbia and Dutchess counties
- 12th District: Rensselaer and Washington counties
- 13th District: Albany County
- 14th District: Greene and Ulster counties
- 15th District: Fulton, Hamilton, Montgomery, Saratoga and Schenectady counties
- 16th District: Clinton, Essex and Warren counties
- 17th District: Franklin and St. Lawrence counties
- 18th District: Jefferson and Lewis counties
- 19th District: Oneida County
- 20th District: Herkimer and Otsego counties
- 21st District: Madison and Oswego counties
- 22nd District: Onondaga and Cortland counties
- 23rd District: Chenango, Delaware and Schoharie counties
- 24th District: Broome, Tompkins and Tioga counties
- 25th District: Cayuga and Wayne counties
- 26th District: Ontario, Seneca and Yates counties
- 27th District: Chemung, Schuyler and Steuben counties
- 28th District: Monroe County
- 29th District: Genesee, Niagara and Orleans counties
- 30th District: Allegany, Livingston and Wyoming counties
- 31st District: Erie County
- 32nd District: Cattaraugus and Chautauqua counties
Note: There are now 62 counties in the State of New York. The counties which are not mentioned in this list had not yet been established, or sufficiently organized, the area being included in one or more of the abovementioned counties.

=== Members ===
The asterisk (*) denotes members of the previous Legislature who continued in office as members of this Legislature.

District	Senator	Party	Notes
1st	Lewis A. Edwards*	Democrat	
2nd	James F. Pierce*	Democrat	
3rd	Henry C. Murphy*	Democrat	
4th	William M. Tweed*	Democrat	
5th	Michael Norton*	Democrat	also an Alderman of New York City
6th	Thomas J. Creamer*	Democrat	
7th	John J. Bradley*	Democrat	
8th	Henry W. Genet*	Democrat	
9th	William Cauldwell*	Democrat	
10th	William M. Graham*	Democrat	
11th	Abiah W. Palmer*	Republican	
12th	Francis S. Thayer*	Republican	
13th	A. Bleecker Banks	Democrat	
14th	George Beach*	Democrat	
15th	Charles Stanford*	Republican	
16th	Matthew Hale*	Republican	
17th	Abraham X. Parker*	Republican	
18th	John O'Donnell*	Republican	
19th	Samuel Campbell*	Republican	
20th	John B. Van Petten*	Republican	
21st	Abner C. Mattoon*	Republican	
22nd	George N. Kennedy*	Republican	
23rd	John F. Hubbard Jr.*	Democrat	
24th	Orlow W. Chapman*	Republican	
25th	Stephen K. Williams*	Republican	
26th	Charles J. Folger*	Republican	on February 4, elected president pro tempore
27th	John I. Nicks*	Republican	
28th	Lewis H. Morgan*	Republican	
29th	Richard Crowley*	Republican	on February 24, elected president pro tempore
30th	Wolcott J. Humphrey*	Republican	
31st	Asher P. Nichols*	Democrat	
32nd	Lorenzo Morris*	Democrat	

=== Employees ===
- Clerk: James Terwilliger
- Sergeant-at-Arms: John H. Kemper
- Assistant Sergeant-at-Arms: George H. Knapp
- Doorkeeper: Charles V. Schram
- Assistant Doorkeeper: Nathaniel Saxton
- Assistant Doorkeeper: David L. Shields
- Assistant Doorkeeper: Elisha T. Burdick

== State Assembly ==
=== Assemblymen ===
The asterisk (*) denotes members of the previous Legislature who continued as members of this Legislature.

Party affiliations follow the vote for Speaker.

District		Assemblymen	Party	Notes
Albany	1st	Hugh Conger	Republican	
Albany	2nd	Adam W. Smith	Democrat	
Albany	3rd	John M. Kimball	Democrat	
Albany	4th	John Tighe	Democrat	
Allegany		Silas Richardson*	Republican	
Broome		William M. Ely	Republican	
Cattaraugus	1st	Claudius V. B. Barse	Republican	
Cattaraugus	2nd	William H. Stuart	Republican	
Cayuga	1st	Charles H. Weed*	Republican	
Cayuga	2nd	Sanford Gifford*	Republican	
Chautauqua	1st	Matthew P. Bemus*	Republican	
Chautauqua	2nd	Winfield S. Cameron*	Republican	
Chemung		Edward L. Patrick	Democrat	
Chenango		Charles Pearsall	Republican	
Clinton		Daniel Stewart	Republican	
Columbia	1st	Edward Sturges	Democrat	
Columbia	2nd	Moses Y. Tilden	Democrat	
Cortland		Hiram Whitmarsh	Republican	
Delaware	1st	Benjamin J. Bassett	Republican	
Delaware	2nd	John Ferris	Republican	
Dutchess	1st	David R. Gould	Republican	
Dutchess	2nd	William W. Hegeman	Republican	
Erie	1st	George J. Bamler*	Democrat	
Erie	2nd	Philip H. Bender	Republican	
Erie	3rd	James A. Chase	Republican	
Erie	4th	Charles B. Rich	Republican	
Erie	5th	Abbot C. Calkins	Republican	
Essex		Samuel Root*	Republican	
Franklin		Edmund F. Sargent*	Republican	
Fulton and Hamilton		William F. Barker	Republican	
Genesee		Edward C. Walker	Republican	
Greene		Baldwin Griffin	Democrat	
Herkimer		Erasmus W. Day	Republican	
Jefferson	1st	Jay Dimick	Republican	
Jefferson	2nd	William W. Butterfield	Republican	
Kings	1st	Hugh M. Clark	Democrat	
Kings	2nd	Henry J. Cullen Jr.	Democrat	
Kings	3rd	Dennis O'Keeffe	Democrat	
Kings	4th	William W. Moseley	Democrat	
Kings	5th	James R. Allaben	Republican	
Kings	6th	Andrew B. Hodges	Republican	
Kings	7th	George L. Fox	Democrat	
Kings	8th	DeWitt C. Tower*	Democrat	
Kings	9th	John C. Jacobs*	Democrat	
Lewis		Chester Ray	Republican	
Livingston		Lewis E. Smith*	Republican	
Madison	1st	Wesley M. Carpenter	Republican	
Madison	2nd	Leonard C. Kilham	Republican	
Monroe	1st	Charles S. Wright	Republican	
Monroe	2nd	Nehemiah C. Bradstreet*	Democrat	
Monroe	3rd	Andrew J. Randall	Republican	
Montgomery		Darius V. Berry	Republican	
New York	1st	Michael C. Murphy*	Democrat	
New York	2nd	Dennis Burns*	Democrat	
New York	3rd	Owen Cavanagh	Democrat	
New York	4th	John Galvin*	Democrat	
New York	5th	Peter Mitchell	Democrat	
New York	6th	Timothy J. Campbell*	Democrat	unsuccessfully contested by Frederick Zimmer
New York	7th	James A. Richmond	Republican	
New York	8th	Martin Nachtmann	Democrat	
New York	9th	William G. Bergen*	Democrat	
New York	10th	Anthony Hartman*	Democrat	
New York	11th	Peter Trainer*	Democrat	
New York	12th	Henry Woltman	Democrat	
New York	13th	William Halpin	Democrat	contested, seat vacated on April 23
New York	13th	Alexander McLeod	Republican	seated on April 23
New York	14th	Charles H. Whalen	Democrat	contested; seat vacated on April 2
New York	14th	James McKiever	Democrat	seated on April 2
New York	15th	Alexander Frear*	Democrat	
New York	16th	James Irving*	Democrat	
New York	17th	George W. Plunkitt	Democrat	
New York	18th	Lawrence D. Kiernan*	Democrat	
New York	19th	Josiah Porter	Democrat	
New York	20th	John Keegan	Democrat	
New York	21st	William Hitchman*	Democrat	
Niagara	1st	Ransom M. Skeels*	Democrat	
Niagara	2nd	Benjamin Farley*	Republican	
Oneida	1st	Eli B. Avery	Republican	
Oneida	2nd	Addison B. Tuttle	Republican	
Oneida	3rd	James Stevens*	Democrat	
Oneida	4th	Erastus Ely	Republican	
Onondaga	1st	James V. Kendall	Republican	
Onondaga	2nd	Moses Summers	Republican	
Onondaga	3rd	Miles B. Hackett	Republican	
Ontario	1st	Henry Ray*	Republican	
Ontario	2nd	George Cook	Republican	
Orange	1st	J. C. Bancroft Davis	Republican	seat vacated on March 26 upon appointment as United States Assistant Secretary of State
Orange	2nd	Thomas J. Lyon	Democrat	
Orleans		Marvin Harris	Republican	
Oswego	1st	Benjamin Doolittle	Republican	
Oswego	2nd	James D. Lasher*	Republican	
Oswego	3rd	Nathan B. Smith	Republican	
Otsego	1st	William W. Campbell	Republican	
Otsego	2nd	Clifford S. Arms	Republican	
Putnam		Morgan Horton	Democrat	
Queens	1st	James B. Pearsall	Democrat	
Queens	2nd	John B. Madden*	Democrat	
Rensselaer	1st	John L. Flagg*	Democrat	
Rensselaer	2nd	Edward Akin	Republican	
Rensselaer	3rd	Harris B. Howard*	Democrat	
Richmond		John Decker*	Democrat	contested; seat vacated on April 27
Richmond		Willett N. Hawkins	Republican	seated on April 27
Rockland		James Suffern	Democrat	
St. Lawrence	1st	George M. Gleason*	Republican	
St. Lawrence	2nd	Julius M. Palmer*	Republican	
St. Lawrence	3rd	Alexander H. Andrews*	Republican	
Saratoga	1st	Truman G. Younglove*	Republican	elected Speaker
Saratoga	2nd	DeWitt C. Hoyt	Republican	
Schenectady		Henry M. Crane	Republican	
Schoharie		Peter R. Dyckman	Democrat	
Schuyler		George Clark*	Republican	
Seneca		Josiah T. Miller	Democrat	
Steuben	1st	Monroe Brundage	Republican	
Steuben	2nd	Samuel Mitchell	Republican	
Suffolk		William A. Conant	Republican	
Sullivan		James L. La Moree	Democrat	
Tioga		Lyman Truman	Republican	
Tompkins		John H. Selkreg*	Republican	
Ulster	1st	Patrick J. Flynn	Democrat	
Ulster	2nd	Abraham E. Hasbrouck*	Democrat	
Ulster	3rd	James O. Schoonmaker	Republican	
Warren		Nicholas B. La Bau*	Republican	
Washington	1st	William J. Perry	Republican	
Washington	2nd	Isaac V. Baker Jr.	Republican	
Wayne	1st	Merritt Thornton	Republican	
Wayne	2nd	Elijah M. K. Glenn*	Republican	
Westchester	1st	Clairborne Ferris	Democrat	
Westchester	2nd	Edward D. Lawrence	Democrat	
Westchester	3rd	James W. Husted	Republican	
Wyoming		Marcus A. Hull	Republican	
Yates		Foster A. Hixson	Republican	

=== Employees ===
- Clerk: Edward F. Underhill
- Sergeant-at-Arms: Samuel C. Pierce
- Doorkeeper: John Hancock
- First Assistant Doorkeeper: Franklin Hutchinson
- Second Assistant Doorkeeper: James Tanner
- Stenographer: Hudson C. Tanner

== Sources ==
- The New York Civil List compiled by Franklin Benjamin Hough, Stephen C. Hutchins and Edgar Albert Werner (1870; see pg. 439 for Senate districts; pg. 444 for senators; pg. 450–463 for Assembly districts; pg. 510f for assemblymen)
- Journal of the Senate (92nd Session) (1869)
- Journal of the Assembly (92nd Session) (1869; Vol. I)
- Journal of the Assembly (92nd Session) (1869; Vol. II)
