= 1867 New York City mayoral election =

- December 3, 1867
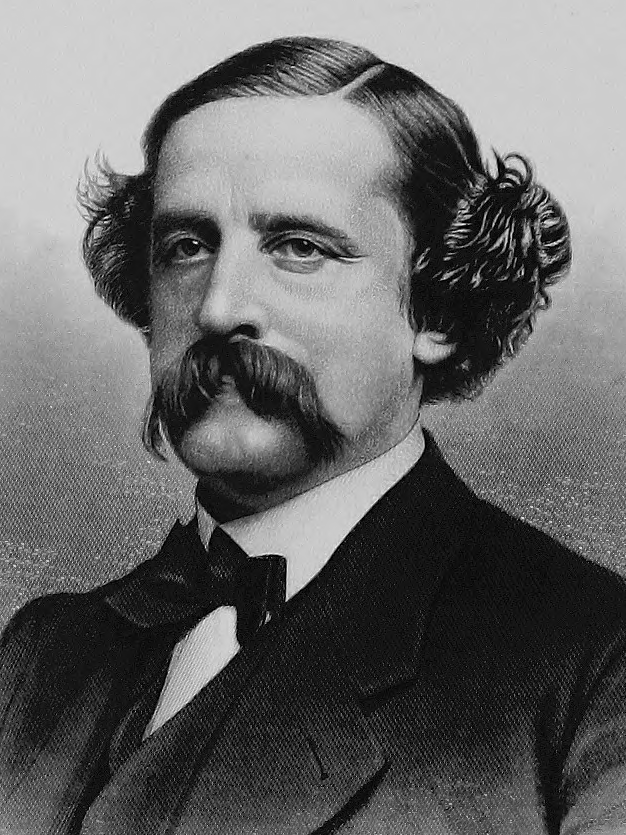

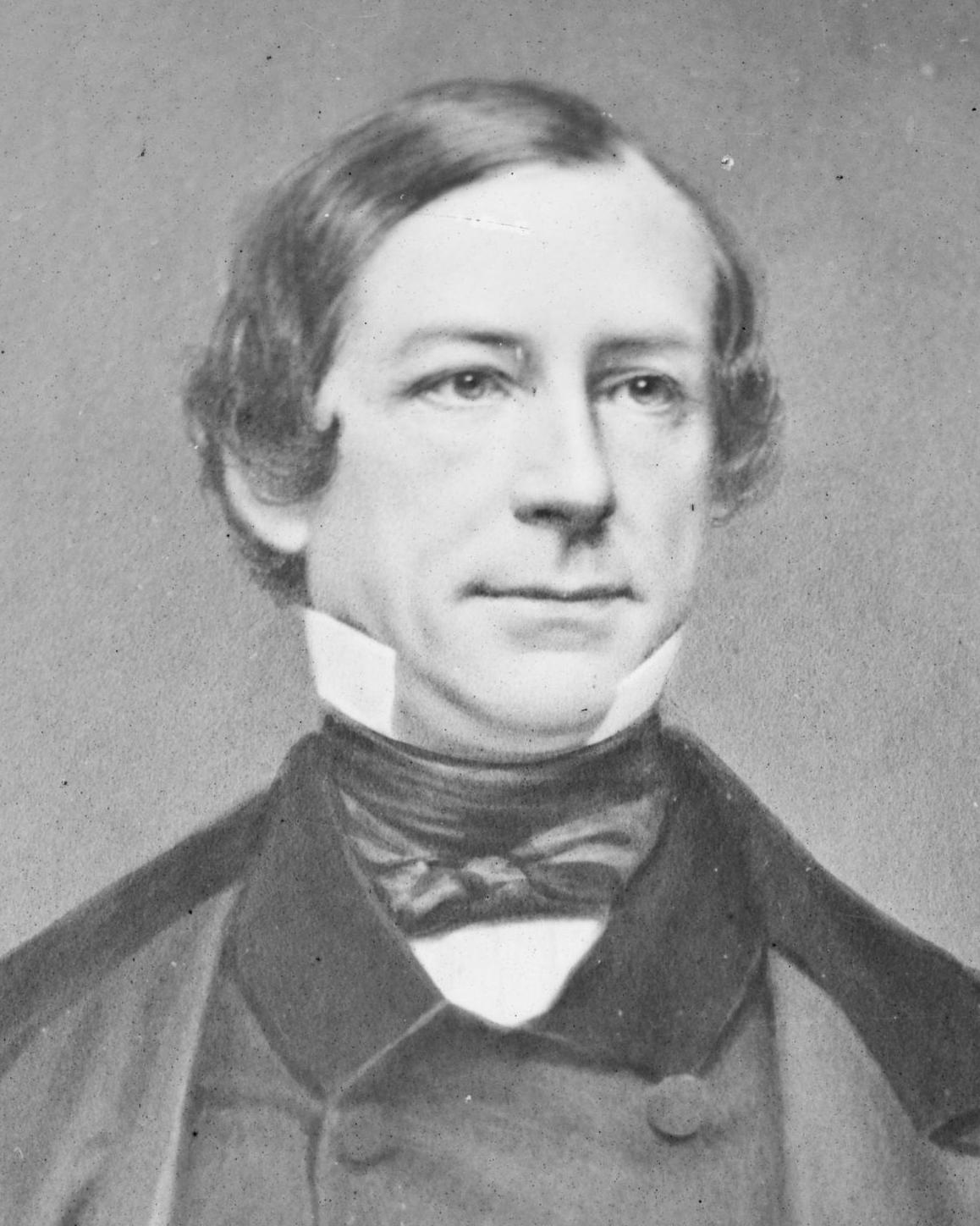

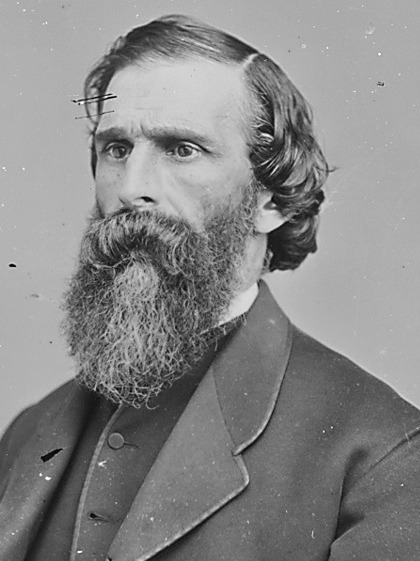
Nominee	John T. Hoffman	Fernando Wood	William A. Darling
Party	Democratic	Independent Democratic	Republican
Alliance	Tammany Hall	Mozart Hall
Popular vote	63,061	22,837	18,483
Percentage	60.41%	21.88%	17.71%
Mayor before election
John T. Hoffman
Democratic
Elected mayor
John T. Hoffman
Democratic

The 1867 New York City mayoral election took place on December 3, 1867, to elect the mayor of New York City.

John T. Hoffman, the incumbent Mayor backed by Tammany Hall, easily won re-election against former Mayor Fernando Wood and Republican nominee William Augustus Darling.

== Background ==
Following his election in 1865, mayor Hoffman's popularity grew. Although corruption still persisted in the city, none of it could be tied to his name. He was even nominated by the Democratic State Committee for governor in 1866, although he narrowly lost to Reuben Fenton. He was re-nominated by Tammany Hall for mayor in 1867.

After receiving a poor performance in the November elections, where they did not elect a single man to office, Mozart Hall unanimously (by acclamation) nominated Fernando Wood for mayor at a meeting held November 12.

By the standards of the Reconstruction era, 1867 proved to be a particularly strong year in election results for the Democratic Party. In 1867, Democratic nominees also won the Boston Baltimore, Pittsburgh, and Manchester (NH) mayoral elections.

== Candidates ==
- John T. Hoffman, incumbent mayor ––Democratic Party nominee, backed by Tammany Hall
- Fernando Wood, congressman and former mayor ––independent nominee, backed by Mozart Hall
- William Augustus Darling, former U.S. Representative from NY-09 ––Republican Party nominee

== Campaign ==
At a nomination ratification meeting, held November 13 at the Cooper Institute, Wood declared himself to be running independent of any political party.

Wood already faced an uphill battle against an extremely popular mayor. Mozart could not come close to matching Tammany Hall in terms of resources and its ability to marshal voters. Moreover, Tammany focused on illegally naturalizing many immigrants before the election so they could register to vote.

Soon Wood began to lose support among much of his own immigrant base. Horace Greeley stated in one of his editorials, "Hoffman may be relied upon as the tool of the Ring," Wood "may enact the role again of a first-class Reform Mayor." This quasi-endorsement was the kiss of death for Wood among the Irish, who were well aware of Greeley's Nativism. In addition, Tammany encouraged the mistaken notion that Hoffman was of German descent and kept his dutch origins quiet. These efforts paid off, as the German Democratic Union General Committee endorsed Hoffman.

The New York Times endorsed Hoffman, urging even Republicans to vote for Hoffman in order to defeat Wood. The newspaper argued that Darling (as the Republican Party's nominee) did not stand a chance of winning the election, and that Wood was abhorrent enough to necessitate strategic voting.

== Results ==
Vote counts resulted in Hoffman handily winning re-election. Tammany Hall-backed candidates also won nearly all down-ballot races.

The total vote for mayor was 104,381, an increase of 22,756 (or 27.9%) from 81,625 in 1865. Historian Gustavus Myers wrote that, while repeat voting was one factor in this increase, the main reason was false registration from illegally naturalized citizens. He noted that in the Eighteenth ward alone in this election, 1,500 fraudulent registrations were discovered. Myers cited this as an example of how Tammany Hall often used fraudulent methods in order to achieve victories in elections, which was a foreshadowing of what would occur in the 1868 election.

1867 New York City mayoral election
Party	Candidate	Votes	%
Democratic	John T. Hoffman (incumbent)	63,061	60.41
Independent Democratic	Fernando Wood	22,837	21.88
Republican	William A. Darling	18,483	17.71
Total votes		104,381	100.00
