= 1868 New York gubernatorial election =

- November 3, 1868
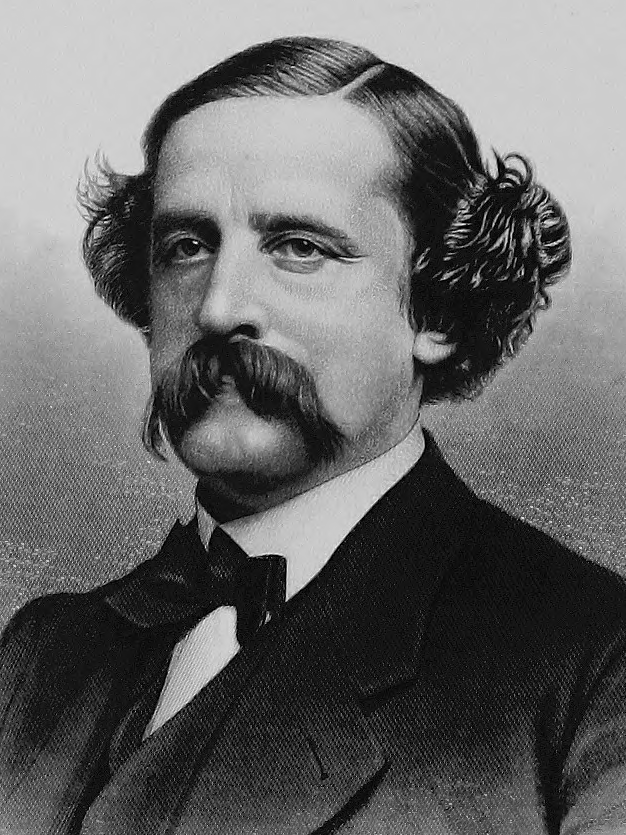

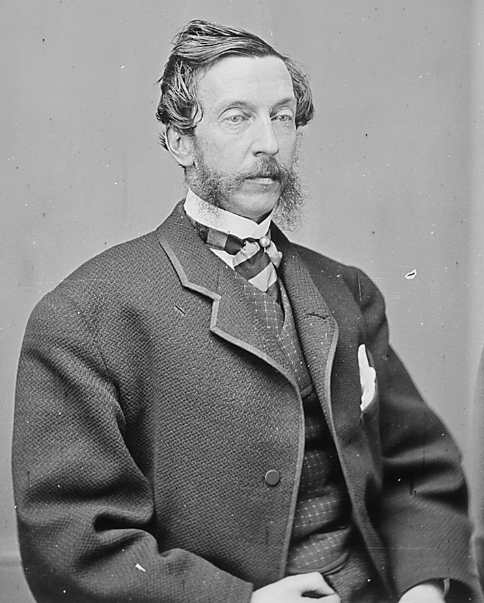
Nominee	John T. Hoffman	John Augustus Griswold
Party	Democratic	Republican
Popular vote	439,301	411,355
Percentage	51.64%	48.36%
- County results Hoffman: 50–60% 60–70% 70–80% Griswold: 50–60% 60–70% 70–80%
Governor before election
Reuben E. Fenton
Republican
Elected Governor
John T. Hoffman
Democratic

The 1868 New York gubernatorial election was held on November 3, 1868. Incumbent Governor Reuben Fenton did not run for re-election to a third term. Mayor of New York City John T. Hoffman won the election over Republican John Augustus Griswold. As of 2026, this is the most recent time any mayor of New York City was elected Governor of New York or any higher office.

== Republican nomination ==
=== Candidates ===
- Horace Greeley, publisher of the New-York Tribune and former U.S. Representative from New York City
- John Augustus Griswold, U.S. Representative from Troy
- Stewart L. Woodford, Lieutenant Governor of New York

=== Convention ===
The Republican state convention met on July 8. Early in the proceedings, the convention resolved to amend the system of delegate apportionment to award delegates to Assembly districts on the basis of the Republican vote; this had the immediate effect of reducing the power of New York City, which was predominantly Democratic, in future conventions.

An informal ballot showed Griswold with a majority of the delegates, and his nomination was ratified unanimously.

1868 New York Republican convention
Party	Candidate	Votes	%
Republican	John A. Griswold	247	65.34%
Republican	Horace Greeley	95	25.13%
Republican	Stewart L. Woodford	36	9.52%
Total votes		378	100.00%

== Democratic nomination ==
=== Candidates ===
- John T. Hoffman, mayor of New York City and nominee in 1866

==== Declined ====
- Henry C. Murphy, state senator and former mayor of Brooklyn, U.S. Minister to the Netherlands, and U.S. Representative

=== Convention ===
The Democratic state convention met on September 2 and 3 at Tweddle Hall in Albany. John T. Hoffman was nominated by acclamation after Henry C. Murphy, leader of the Brooklyn Democratic Party, declined to be a candidate citing "contrariety of opinion... rendering my nomination at least doubtful, and calculated to engender bad feelings in the party." Hoffman's nomination was a demonstration of growing strength for Tammany Hall; however, Tammany was defeated on the ballot for Lieutenant Governor, when the forces of Henry C. Murphy of Brooklyn joined with the county parties to Allen C. Beach over Tammany candidate Albert P. Lanning.

A separate German convention also met on September 2 at Schreiber's Hotel in Albany, endorsing Hoffman.

== General election ==
=== Candidates ===
- John T. Hoffman, mayor of New York City and nominee in 1866 (Democratic)
- John Augustus Griswold, U.S. Representative from Troy (Republican)

=== Results ===
1868 New York gubernatorial election
Party	Candidate	Votes	%	±%
Democratic	John T. Hoffman	439,301	51.64%	▲2.60
Republican	John Augustus Griswold	411,355	48.36%	▼2.60
Total votes		850,656	100.00%	

=== Allegations of fraud ===
According to author and historian Oliver E. Allen, this election was "almost certainly the most crookedest in the city's history." So blatant were the frauds that the U.S. Congress ordered an investigation into it. It was discovered that, in preparation for the election, Tammany Hall allotted $1,000 to each election district in NYC (of which there were 327 in the city, for a total of $327,000) for election engineering. On October 30, Boss Tweed announced to the general committee that “at 10 o’clock to-morrow the money for electioneering purposes will be distributed” and that those who came first would be served first.

In addition, Tammany had focused on a massive campaign to illegally naturalize many immigrants to register to vote. More than six weeks leading up to the election, according to Gustavus Myers it was estimated the Hall had naturalized around 25,000 to 30,000 citizens, however Oliver E. Allen puts the number at 41,112. Of these naturalized citizens, it is estimated not less than 85% of them voted for the straight Tammany ticket in November. The Supreme, Common Pleas, and Superior Courts played a vital role in these naturalizations. Although judge Cardozo could not play a role in these events, judges George G. Barnard and John McCunn filled his place.

== See also ==
- New York gubernatorial elections
- 1868 New York state election
- 1868 United States elections
