= Alexander Barkley =

American politician

Alexander Barkley (1817–1893) was an American politician from New York.

== Life ==
Barkley was born on May 4, 1817, in Argyle, New York.

He was the son of James Barkley and Margaret (MacDougall) Barkley.

In 1861, he was appointed Superintendent of Canal Repairs for Sections 1 and 2 of the Champlain Canal. He was a member of the New York State Assembly (Washington Co., 1st D.) in 1865 and 1866.

At the New York state election, 1868, he ran for Canal Commissioner on the Republican ticket but was defeated by Democrat Oliver Bascom. At the New York state election, 1870, he ran again but was again defeated, this time by the incumbent Democrat George W. Chapman. At the New York state election, 1871, he ran again and was elected, being in office from 1872 to 1874. At the New York state election, 1874, he was defeated for re-election by Democrat Adin Thayer. During the investigation of the Canal Ring, Barkley was indicted by a grand jury in Buffalo, New York, for conspiracy.

Barclay died January 2, 1893, at Argyle, Washington County, New York.

He was buried at the Prospect Hill Cemetery in Argyle, New York.

== Sources ==
- Annual Report of the Canal Commissioners (1862) [gives name as "Barckley"]
- THE STATE TICKET in NYT on July 11, 1868
- THE NOVEMBER ELECTION in NYT on October 30, 1870
- THE CANAL FRAUDS in NYT on October 3, 1875

New York State Assembly
Preceded by R. King Crocker	New York State Assembly; Washington County, 1st District; 1865–1866	Succeeded by Thomas Shiland
