= 1870 New York gubernatorial election =

- November 8, 1870
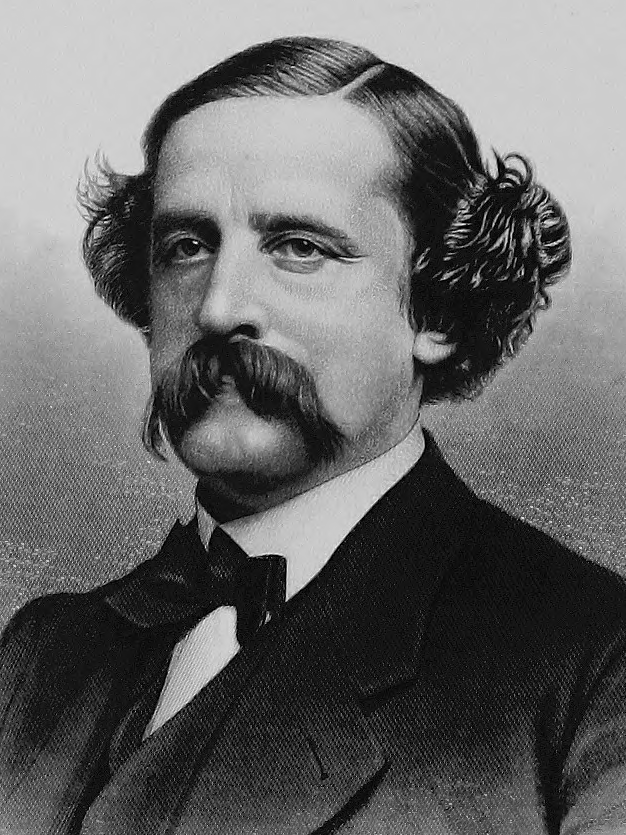

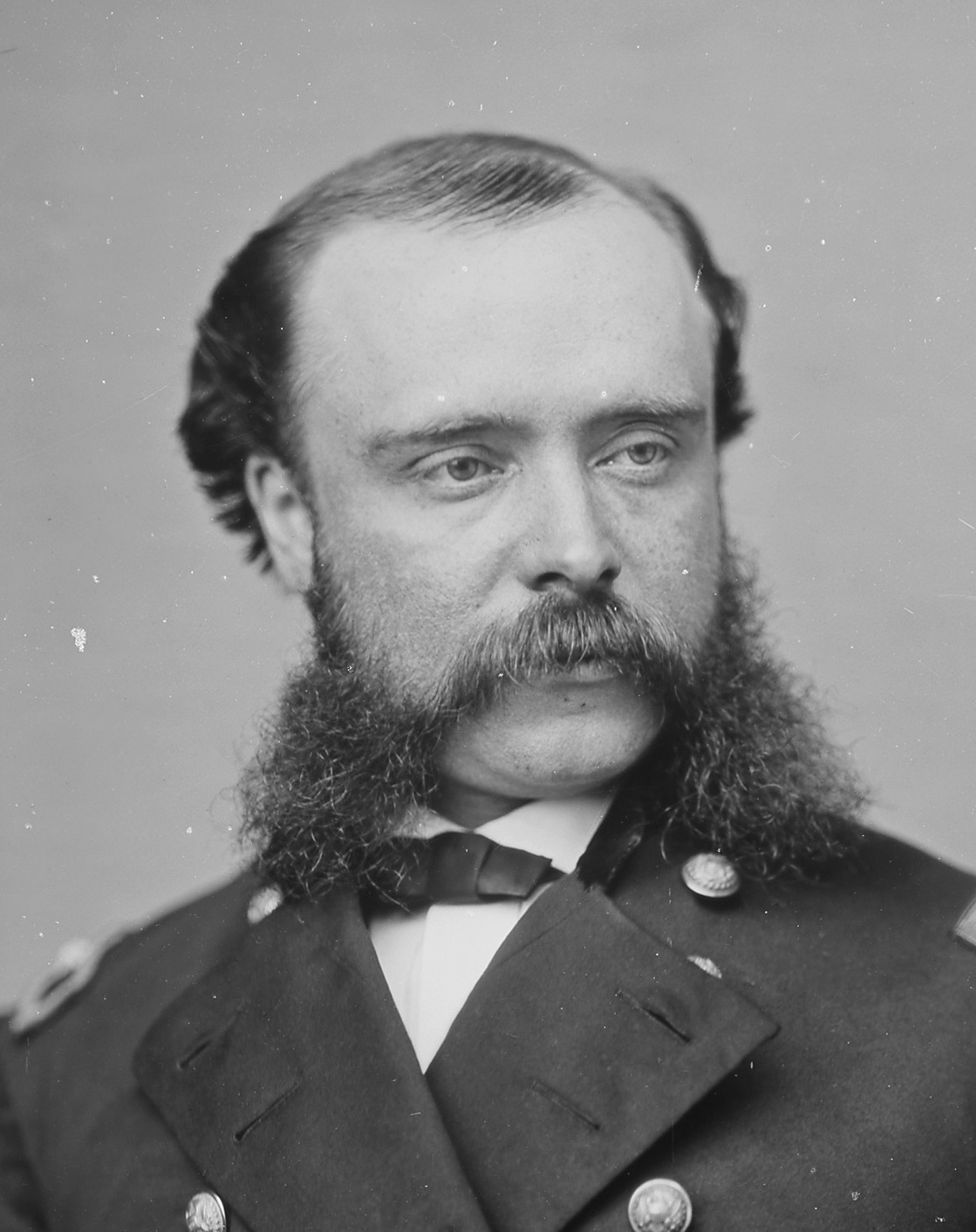
Nominee	John T. Hoffman	Stewart L. Woodford
Party	Democratic	Republican
Popular vote	399,490	366,424
Percentage	52.16%	47.84%
- County results Hoffman: 50–60% 60–70% 70–80% Woodford: 40–50% 50–60% 60–70% 70–80% No Data
Governor before election
John T. Hoffman
Democratic
Elected Governor
John T. Hoffman
Democratic

The 1870 New York gubernatorial election was held on November 8, 1870. Incumbent Governor John T. Hoffman won re-election to a second term in office over Republican Stewart L. Woodford. As of 2026, this is the most recent time a former mayor of New York City was elected Governor of New York or to any higher office.

== Republican nomination ==
=== Candidates ===
- George William Curtis, political editor of Harper's Weekly
- Horace Greeley, publisher of the New-York Tribune and former U.S. Representative from New York City
- Stewart L. Woodford, former Lieutenant Governor of New York

=== Convention ===
The Republican state convention met on September 7. The convention was divided between supporters of the state's two Republican United States Senators, Roscoe Conkling and Reuben Fenton, who were in a struggle over the state's vast federal patronage network. The first skirmish was over the election of a temporary chair; George William Curtis, a reformer supported by Conkling, defeated Charles Van Wyck, supported by Fenton, 220–150. Curtis delivered an address calling the convention to order which received thunderous applause and, during the afternoon recess, his name was elevated as a candidate for governor.

When the convention met that evening, Curtis was formally nominated along with Horace Greeley and Stewart L. Woodford, each of whom had been candidates in the tightly contested convention of 1868. Greeley was supported by Fenton. After an inconclusive informal ballot which showed support evenly distributed among the three candidates, a motion was adopted for a formal ballot, which showed Woodford gaining primarily at the expense of Curtis. A motion to adjourn failed, and a second formal ballot showed most Curtis supporters abandoning him for Woodford, who won a majority of the vote. Curtis thanked the convention for the honor of its support and withdrew, moving to make Woodford's nomination unanimous.

1870 New York Republican convention, informal ballot
Party	Candidate	Votes	%
Republican	Stewart L. Woodford	153	38.20%
Republican	Horace Greeley	143	35.70%
Republican	George William Curtis	104.5	26.09%
Total votes		400.5	100.00%

1870 New York Republican convention, first ballot
Party	Candidate	Votes	%	±%
Republican	Stewart L. Woodford	170.5	42.95%	▲17.5
Republican	Horace Greeley	139	35.01%	▼4
Republican	George William Curtis	87.5	22.04%	▼17
Total votes		397	100.00%	

1870 New York Republican convention, second ballot
Party	Candidate	Votes	%	±%
Republican	Stewart L. Woodford	258	67.28%	▲87.5
Republican	Horace Greeley	105.5	27.51%	▼33.5
Republican	George William Curtis	20	5.22%	▼67.5
Total votes		383.5	100.00%	

== General election ==
=== Candidates ===
- John T. Hoffman, incumbent Governor since 1869 (Democratic)
- Stewart L. Woodford, former Lieutenant Governor of New York (Republican)

=== Results ===
1870 New York gubernatorial election
Party	Candidate	Votes	%	±%
Democratic	John T. Hoffman	399,490	52.16%	▲0.52
Republican	Stewart L. Woodford	366,424	47.84%	▼0.52
Total votes		850,656	100.00%	

== See also ==
- New York gubernatorial elections
- 1870 New York state election
- 1870 United States elections
