= George W. Chapman (politician) =

American politician

George W. Chapman was an American lawyer and politician from New York.

== Life ==
George Walton Chapman was born 19 Aug 1832 in Saratoga County, New York, and lived in Ballston Spa, New York, where he died 20 April 1881. He attended the University of Rochester where he is listed on the Delta Psi fraternity rolls for 1854. In 1862, he was Supervisor of the Town of Milton. He was a member of the New York State Assembly (Saratoga Co., 1st D.) in 1865.

In 1869, Chapman was appointed by Governor John Thompson Hoffman a Canal Commissioner, to fill the vacancy caused by the death of Oliver Bascom. At the New York state election, 1870, he was elected, on the Democratic ticket, to succeed himself for the remainder of Bascom's term, and remained in office until the end of 1871. At the New York state election, 1871, he was defeated running for re-election. He is buried in Ballston Spa Village Cemetery, Ballston Spa, Saratoga County, New York.

== Sources ==
- The New York Civil List compiled by Franklin Benjamin Hough, Stephen C. Hutchins and Edgar Albert Werner (1867; pages 502 and 509)
- Political Graveyard
- The state tickets, in NYT on October 30, 1870
- Catalogue of the Delta Psi Fraternity, New York: Privately Published, 1889;
- US Federal Census for 1870, George W. Chapman, Milton, Saratoga, New York
- Sawin, Mark W., Raising Kane: Elisha Kent Kane and the Culture of Fame in Antebellum America, Philadelphia: American Philosophical Society, 2008

New York State Assembly
Preceded by Ira Brockett	New York State Assembly; Saratoga County, 1st District; 1865	Succeeded by Truman G. Younglove
