= 1866 New York gubernatorial election =

- November 6, 1866
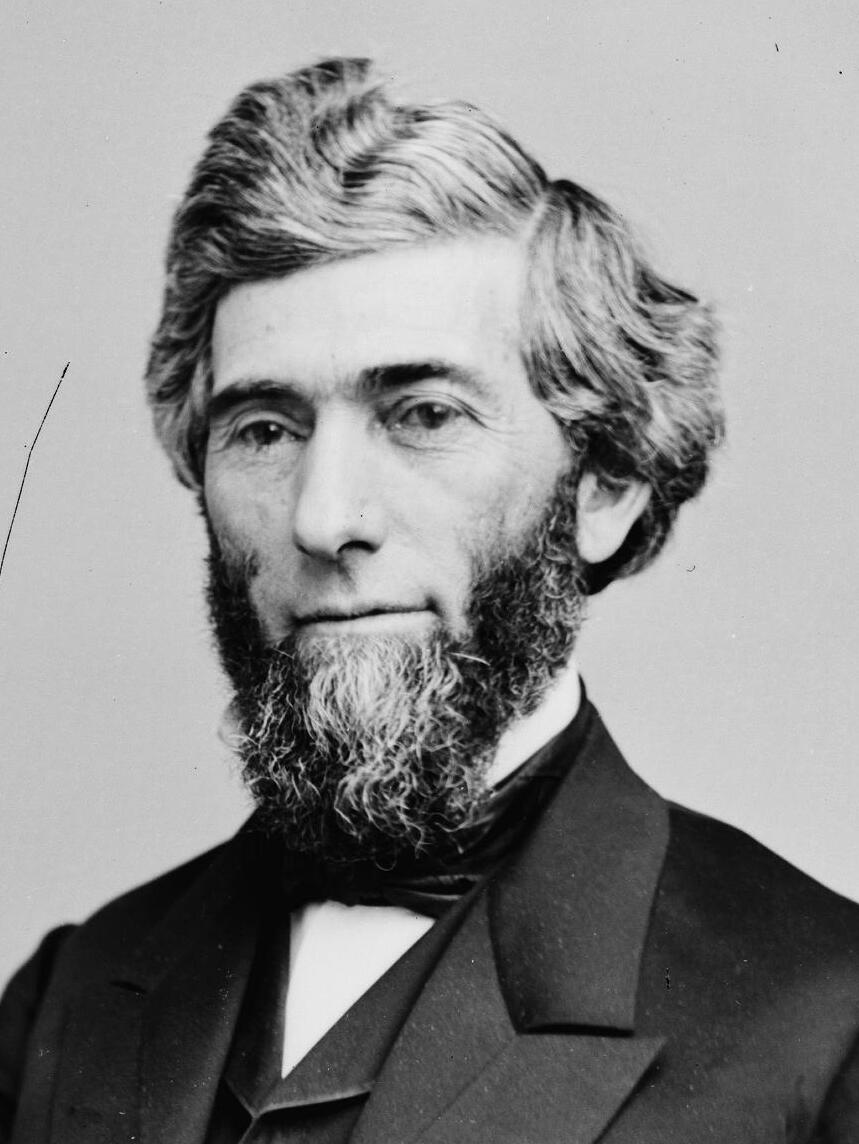

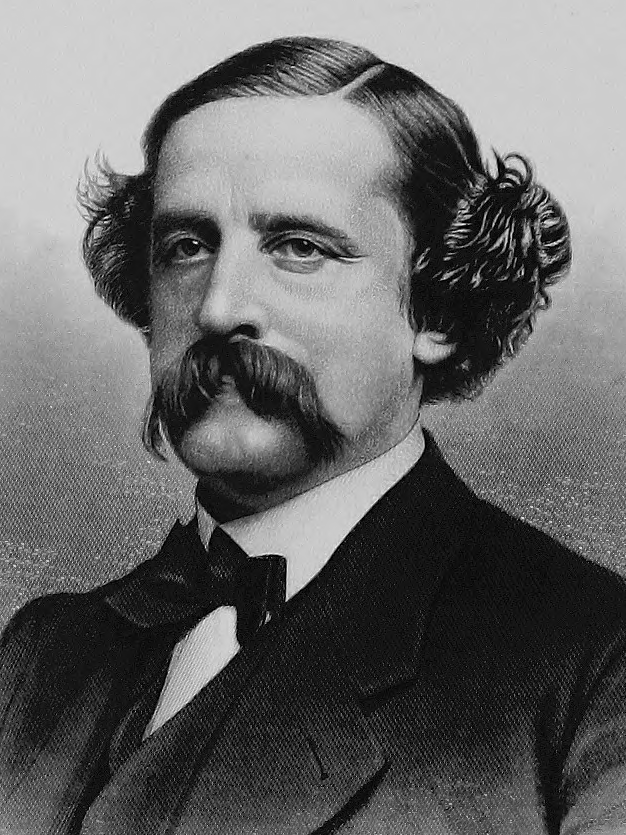
| Nominee | Reuben E. Fenton | John T. Hoffman |
| Party | Republican | Conservative Union |
| Popular vote | 366,315 | 352,526 |
| Percentage | 50.96% | 49.04% |
- County results Fenton: 50–60% 60–70% 70–80% Hoffman: 50–60% 60–70% 70–80% No Data
Governor before election
Reuben E. Fenton
Republican
Elected Governor
Reuben E. Fenton
Republican

The 1866 New York gubernatorial election was held on November 6, 1866. Incumbent Governor Reuben Fenton was re-elected to a second term in office over Conservative Union candidate John T. Hoffman.

== Conservative Union nomination ==
=== Candidates ===
- John Adams Dix, former U.S. Secretary of the Treasury and U.S. Senator (Republican)
- John T. Hoffman, mayor of New York City (Democratic)
- Henry C. Murphy, State Senator and former mayor of Brooklyn and U.S. Minister to the Netherlands (Democratic)

=== Convention ===
The Conservative Union state convention met from September 10 to 12 at Tweddle Hall in Albany. The convention was called by members of the Democratic Party with the intention of welcoming War Democrats, who had joined the National Union Party in 1864, back into the fold. They were joined by conservative Republicans who supported the Andrew Johnson administration and opposed the re-election of Governor Fenton, including Thurlow Weed.

Ahead of the convention, the nomination was expected to come down to New York City mayor John T. Hoffman and John Adams Dix, with Dix rising among the delegates on the eve of the convention, especially outside of New York City. Brooklyn and Richmond County were expected to support Henry C. Murphy.

There was a great deal of conflict over the organization of the convention; the Democratic portion of the delegates, supporting Hoffman, sought to delay the convention to prevent Dix from receiving the nomination. With a large lobbying effort backed with $30,000 in funding, they launched acrid criticisms of Dix, including his war record, for which they singled out his arrests and internment of Democratic dissenters. Motions to delay proceedings passed with the support of Hoffman and Murphy supporters in both the morning and evening sessions on September 10. The afternoon adjournment was controversial, as temporary chairman Sanford E. Church declared adjournment despite overwhelming votes against the motion.

Following the adjournment, Hoffman appeared to regain the momentum, with a number of Dix supporters in the Democratic Party defecting to Hoffman. As the second day proceeded, momentum for Hoffman appeared to trend toward his unanimous nomination, with the Republicans receiving the nomination for Lieutenant Governor as consolation.

On September 12, Hoffman was formally placed in nomination, and Republican Edwards Pierrepont withdrew Dix's name from consideration, endorsing Hoffman. Francis Kernan moved for nomination by acclamation, which carried enthusiastically. Robert H. Pruyn was nominated by a two-thirds vote for Lieutenant Governor.

== General election ==
=== Candidates ===
- John T. Hoffman, mayor of New York City (Conservative Union)
- Reuben Fenton, incumbent Governor since 1865 (Republican)

=== Results ===
1866 New York gubernatorial election
| Party | Candidate | Votes | % | ±% |
|---|---|---|---|---|
| Republican | Reuben Fenton | 366,315 | 50.96% | ▲0.39 |
| Conservative Union | John T. Hoffman | 352,526 | 49.04% | ▼0.39 |
| Total votes | | 718,841 | 100.00% | |

=== New York City results ===
Results by ward (New York County)
| Ward | Fenton Republican | | Hoffman Con. Union | | Total |
| Ward | Votes | % | Votes | % | Votes |
|---|---|---|---|---|---|
| 1 | 179 | 7.56% | 2,190 | 92.44% | 2,369 |
| 2 | 134 | 33.42% | 267 | 66.58% | 401 |
| 3 | 196 | 24.84% | 593 | 75.16% | 789 |
| 4 | 443 | 14.32% | 2,650 | 85.68% | 3,093 |
| 5 | 803 | 27.17% | 2,152 | 72.83% | 2,955 |
| 6 | 297 | 8.36% | 3,254 | 91.64% | 3,551 |
| 7 | 1,142 | 19.70% | 4,656 | 80.30% | 5,798 |
| 8 | 1,381 | 26.05% | 3,920 | 73.95% | 5,301 |
| 9 | 3,207 | 43.37% | 4,187 | 56.63% | 7,394 |
| 10 | 1,284 | 28.91% | 3,157 | 71.09% | 4,441 |
| 11 | 1,601 | 20.71% | 6,128 | 79.29% | 7,729 |
| 12 | 1,657 | 36.02% | 2,943 | 63.98% | 4,600 |
| 13 | 1,025 | 25.13% | 3,053 | 74.87% | 4,078 |
| 14 | 601 | 15.04% | 3,396 | 84.96% | 3,997 |
| 15 | 1,728 | 43.67% | 2,229 | 56.33% | 3,957 |
| 16 | 2,594 | 41.56% | 3,647 | 58.44% | 6,241 |
| 17 | 2,869 | 26.09% | 8,128 | 73.91% | 10,997 |
| 18 | 2,474 | 34.09% | 4,783 | 65.91% | 7,257 |
| 19 | 2,263 | 34.96% | 4,210 | 65.04% | 6,473 |
| 20 | 2,669 | 30.41% | 6,109 | 69.59% | 8,778 |
| 21 | 2,530 | 38.37% | 4,063 | 61.63% | 6,593 |
| 22 | 2,415 | 32.74% | 4,962 | 67.26% | 7,377 |
| Totals | 33,492 | 29.34% | 80,677 | 70.66% | 114,169 |

== See also ==
- New York gubernatorial elections
- 1866 New York state election
- 1866 United States elections
