= George L. Fox (politician) =

American politician

George L. Fox (February 20, 1831 – December 5, 1910) was an American lawyer, judge, and politician from New York.

== Life ==
Fox was born on February 20, 1831, in New York City. His father, John Oscar Fox, was a prominent banker in the city from 1828 to 1843, when he moved with his family to Williamsburg.

In 1849, Fox began to study law under Harvey A. Weed in New York City, later continuing his studies in the law office of Brainerd & Rice. He was admitted to the bar in 1853. He then formed a partnership with George Thompson of Williamsburg, later a judge in the City Court of Brooklyn. The law firm ended in 1858, when Fox was elected Justice of the 4th District Court of Brooklyn as a Democrat.

In the 1868 presidential election, Fox was a presidential elector for Horatio Seymour and Francis Preston Blair, Jr. In 1868 he ran for the New York State Assembly as a Democrat to represent the Kings County 7th District. He won the election and served in the Assembly in 1869.

In 1873, Mayor Samuel S. Powell appointed Fox commissioner of the proposed consolidation of Brooklyn with the county towns in Kings County. He was also elected supervisor-at-large of Kings County that year, and he presided over the board of supervisors in 1874 and 1875. In 1878, he was appointed a member of the board of education. In 1886, he was appointed a park commissioner.

Fox served as counsel for the Kings County Savings Institution for many years. He was also a director of the Manufacturers National Bank and the Broadway Railroad Company. He was a member of the Friendly Sons of St. Patrick.

Fox died at home on December 5, 1910. He was buried in Green-Wood Cemetery.

New York State Assembly
Preceded by Caleb L. Smith	New York State Assembly; Kings County, 7th District; 1869	Succeeded by Samuel T. Maddox
