= Henry A. Barnum =

American politician

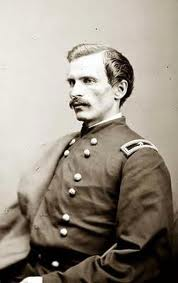
- General Barnum in his Union Army uniform during the Civil War

Member of the New York State Assembly from the 21st district
- In office January 1, 1885 – December 31, 1886
- Preceded by: Theodore Roosevelt
- Succeeded by: George W. Lyon

Personal details
- Born: Henry Alanson Barnum; September 24, 1833 Jamesville, New York, U.S.
- Died: January 29, 1892 (aged 58) New York City, U.S.
- Resting place: Oakwood Cemetery Syracuse, New York

Military service
- Allegiance: United States
- Branch/service: United States Army; Union Army
- Rank: Brevet Major General
- Unit: 3rd Brigade
- Commands: (New York (state)) 149th Regiment New York Volunteer
- Battles: American Civil War; Battle of Malvern Hill; Battle of Lookout Mountain; Battle of Peachtree Creek; Battle of Kennesaw Mountain
- Awards: Medal of Honor

Henry Alanson Barnum (September 24, 1833 – January 29, 1892) was a United States Army officer during the American Civil War and a recipient of the United States military's highest decoration, the Medal of Honor. He received this honor in 1889, for his heroism during the Battle of Lookout Mountain in November, 1863.

== Early life ==
Barnum was born in Jamesville, New York, and educated in the common schools. He attended Syracuse Institute and passed his bar exam in 1860, four years after his graduation.

== Civil War ==
Barnum entered the U.S. service on May 13, 1861, as captain of Company I, 12th N.Y. Infantry, at the age of 27; and afterward in October 1861 was promoted to major of that regiment. He served with distinction with that command, including the Peninsula Campaign under Maj. Gen. George B. McClellan, until July 1, 1862, when he was dangerously wounded by gunshot through the left ilium, at Malvern Hill, Virginia. At the time, it was presumed to be a mortal wound. His body was abandoned and fell into the hands of the enemy; afterward, he returned to the Union lines, sufficiently recovered from his injury by October 4, 1862 to accept a commission as colonel in the 149th New York. He made rank September 17, 1862, and was mustered into service with the regiment at Syracuse, New York.

Not being able to assume immediate command, he joined the regiment in the field on the eve of its departure from Fairfax Station, Virginia, January 18, 1863. He soon required further surgical operations, and on April 1, obtained leave of absence and went to Albany, New York, for treatment under Dr. March.

He next joined the regiment at Edward's Ferry, Maryland, during the Gettysburg campaign, but was still too ill to render active service only part of the time, and at Ellis' Ford, Virginia, August 6, 1863, was compelled a second time to leave the regiment, and went to Washington, D.C., for treatment.

He again joined the regiment at Wauhatchie, Tennessee, on November 10, 1863, and received a flesh wound in the right forearm while leading the charge of his regiment at the Battle of Lookout Mountain, November 24, 1863.

On December 23, in pursuance of an order of Maj. Gen. George H. Thomas, he was detailed to convey the captured flags taken by the 149th New York and other regiments to the War Department at Washington, and also received a leave of absence for twenty days, to take effect after the performance of such duty. For this service, no recognition was given at the time, but later Col. Barnum received the Medal of Honor. While absent in the performance of this duty, Barnum received further surgical treatment, and being disabled for field duty, was placed on recruiting service for the regiment, and again joined his command at Kennesaw Mountain, Georgia, about June 26, 1864, and a few days later was wounded by a fragment of shell in the right side at Peach Tree Creek, Georgia, July 20, 1864.

On September 10, following the death of Colonel David Ireland at Atlanta, Barnum assumed command of the 3rd Brigade, which he retained for the rest of the war.

At Savannah, Georgia, Barnum led his brigade, first in Sherman's command, into the captured city, and under Brig. Gen. John W. Geary had charge of its western portion during the occupancy by General Sherman. Soon after the capture of Savannah, Barnum received the brevet rank of brigadier general of U.S. Volunteers, and afterwards at Washington, D.C., the full rank of that grade to date May 31, 1865, and soon afterward the brevet rank of major general of U.S. Volunteers to date from March 13, 1865.

== Postbellum career ==
Barnum resigned from the service on January 9, 1866.

Barnum became President of The Central New York Peat & Marl Company incorporated in Savannah, New York on February 14, 1866, with a capitalization of $5MM and 50k shares issued at $100 each.

After the American Civil War, Barnum was frequently honored in public and private life. He was New York State Prison Inspector from 1866 to 1868, elected on the Republican ticket at the 1865 New York state election, but defeated for re-election at the 1868 New York state election.

He was a member of the New York State Assembly (New York Co., 21st D.) in 1885.

Barnum died in New York City and is buried in Oakwood Cemetery in Syracuse, New York.

== Medal of Honor citation ==
Rank and organization: Colonel, 149th New York Infantry. Place and date: At Chattanooga, Tenn., November 23, 1863. Entered service at: Syracuse, N.Y. Born: September 24, 1833, Jamesville, Onondaga County, N.Y. Date of issue: July 1889.

Citation:

Although suffering severely from wounds, he led his regiment, inciting the men to greater action by word and example until again severely wounded.

== See also ==
- List of American Civil War generals (Union)
- List of Medal of Honor recipients
- List of American Civil War Medal of Honor recipients: A–F
