= 149th New York Infantry Regiment =

- Active: September 18, 1862, to June 12, 1865
- Country: United States
- Allegiance: Union
- Branch: Infantry
- Size: 1,155
- Engagements: Battle of Chancellorsville, Battle of Gettysburg, Battle of the Lookout Mountain, Battle of Atlanta

The 149th New York Infantry Regiment was an infantry regiment that served in the Union Army during the American Civil War.

== Service ==
The 149th New York Infantry was organized at Syracuse, N.Y., and mustered in September 18, 1862.

== Campaigns ==
The regiment, under the command of Henry A. Barnum, left Syracuse on September 23, 1862, and within a short time joined General McClellan's army. It was assigned to the Third Brigade, Geary's Division, Twelfth Corps, in which command it fought at Chancellorsville, losing there 15 killed, 68 wounded, and 103 captured or missing.

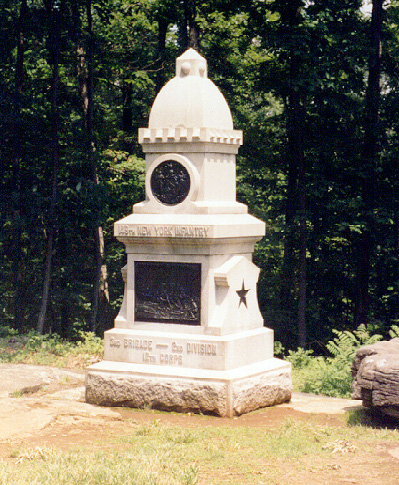
Gettysburg Monument

At Gettysburg the regiment participated in the famous defense of Culp's Hill, made by Greene's Brigade, in which the One Hundred and Forty-ninth, fighting behind breastworks, lost 6 killed, 46 wounded, and 3 missing, but inflicted many times that loss on its assailants.

With the Twelfth Corps, it was transferred to the Army of the Cumberland, and the Onondaga boys fought as bravely in Tennessee as in Virginia or at Gettysburg. At Lookout Mountain, Tenn., they captured five flags while fighting under Hooker in that memorable affair, their casualties amounting to 10 killed and 64 wounded.

Before starting on the Atlanta campaign the Twelfth Corps was designated the Twentieth, its command being given to General Hooker. The regiment started on that campaign with 380 fighting men, of whom 136 were killed or wounded before reaching Atlanta. Lieutenant-Colonel Charles B. Randall, a gallant and skilful officer, was killed at Peach Tree Creek, in which action the regiment sustained its heaviest loss while on that campaign, its casualties there aggregating 17 killed, 25 wounded, and 10 missing.

The regiment after marching with Sherman to the Sea was actively engaged in the Siege of Savannah, and then marched through the Carolinas on the final campaign which ended in the surrender of Johnston.

The regiment mustered out on June 12, 1865, after participating in the Grand Review of the Armies.

== Legacy ==
6 Medals of Honor were awarded to members of the 149th, including one to Colonel Barnum.

== Total strength and casualties ==
The regiment lost 4 officers and 129 enlisted men killed in action or mortally wounded and 78 enlisted men who died of disease, for a total of 211 fatalities. 18.3% of the men who served in the regiment would die during its time of service.

== Commanders ==
- Colonel Henry A. Barnum

== See also ==
- List of New York Civil War regiments
