= William Hitchman =

American politician

William Hitchman (November 18, 1830 – 1900) was an American politician.

== Life ==
He was born on November 18, 1830, in Pearl Street in New York City, the son of a livery stable keeper. He was apprenticed to carriage painter James Flynn, in Eighty-sixth Street near Third Avenue. He joined the 45 Engine Company as a runner, and got his certificate when he was twenty-one years old. His comrades elected him secretary. Carriage painting injured his health and he abandoned this trade, to become a policeman instead. He became a lieutenant, and held this rank in the 19th Ward when the fight between the Municipal and Metropolitan Departments began. Resigning from the force, he entered United States Weigher Dennis McCarthy's office as clerk, and remained there about a year.

He was a friend of Boss William Tweed who launched him on his political career. From 1859 to 1867, he was engrossing clerk of the Board of Aldermen with a desk at the City Library. In 1860, he was elected a member of the Board of School Trustees of the 19th Ward, and served for two terms. At the close of his second term, he was chosen School Commissioner. In 1861, he was elected a member of the Tammany Hall General Committee, and in 1863 became its secretary. In 1864 he was made a trustee of the Fire Department.

He was a delegate to the New York State Constitutional Convention of 1867–68.

He was a member of the New York State Assembly (New York Co., 21st D.) in 1868, 1869, 1870 and 1871; and was Speaker in 1868, 1870 and 1871.

In 1870, when the "Tweed Charter" reorganized the Metropolitan Fire Department, he became president of the Board of Fire Commissioners.

After Tweed's fall, he joined the County Democracy, a faction of the Democratic Party opposed to John Kelly.

In 1887, he was arrested as an insane person and taken to Bellevue Hospital.

== Sources ==
- His arrest in NYT on October 24, 1887
- Meeting of the Anti-Kelly faction in NYT on January 17, 1882
- The new Fire Commissioners, in NYT on May 1, 1870
- Bio at History of New York Fire Department
- Bio in Life Sketches of Executive Officers, and Members of the Legislature of the State of New York by H. H. Boone & Theodore P. Cooke (Weed, Parsons & Co, Albany NY, 1870)

Political offices
Preceded by Edmund L. Pitts	Speaker of the New York State Assembly; 1868	Succeeded by Truman G. Younglove
Preceded by Truman G. Younglove	Speaker of the New York State Assembly; 1870 - 1871	Succeeded by Henry Smith
New York State Assembly
Preceded by Henry W. Genet	New York State Assembly; New York County, 21st District; 1868-1871	Succeeded by William A. Whitbeck
