= Caleb L. Smith =

American politician

Caleb Lemuel Smith (November 21, 1829 – April 20, 1890) was an American builder and politician from New York.

== Life ==
Smith was born on November 21, 1829, in New York City, New York. He moved into the country when he was young and grew up on a farm.

Smith was apprenticed in the carpenters trade in Brooklyn. He later became a successful builder and architect in the city.

In 1867, Smith was elected to the New York State Assembly as a Democrat, representing the Kings County 7th District. He served in the Assembly in 1868. In the 1884 United States House of Representatives election, he was the Democratic candidate for New York's 3rd congressional district.

Smith died at home on April 20, 1890. He was buried in Cypress Hills Cemetery.

New York State Assembly
Preceded by Henry M. Dixon	New York State Assembly; Kings County, 7th District; 1868	Succeeded by George L. Fox
