= Hannis Taylor =

American diplomat, lawyer, and writer (1851–1922)

The Honorable Hannis Taylor
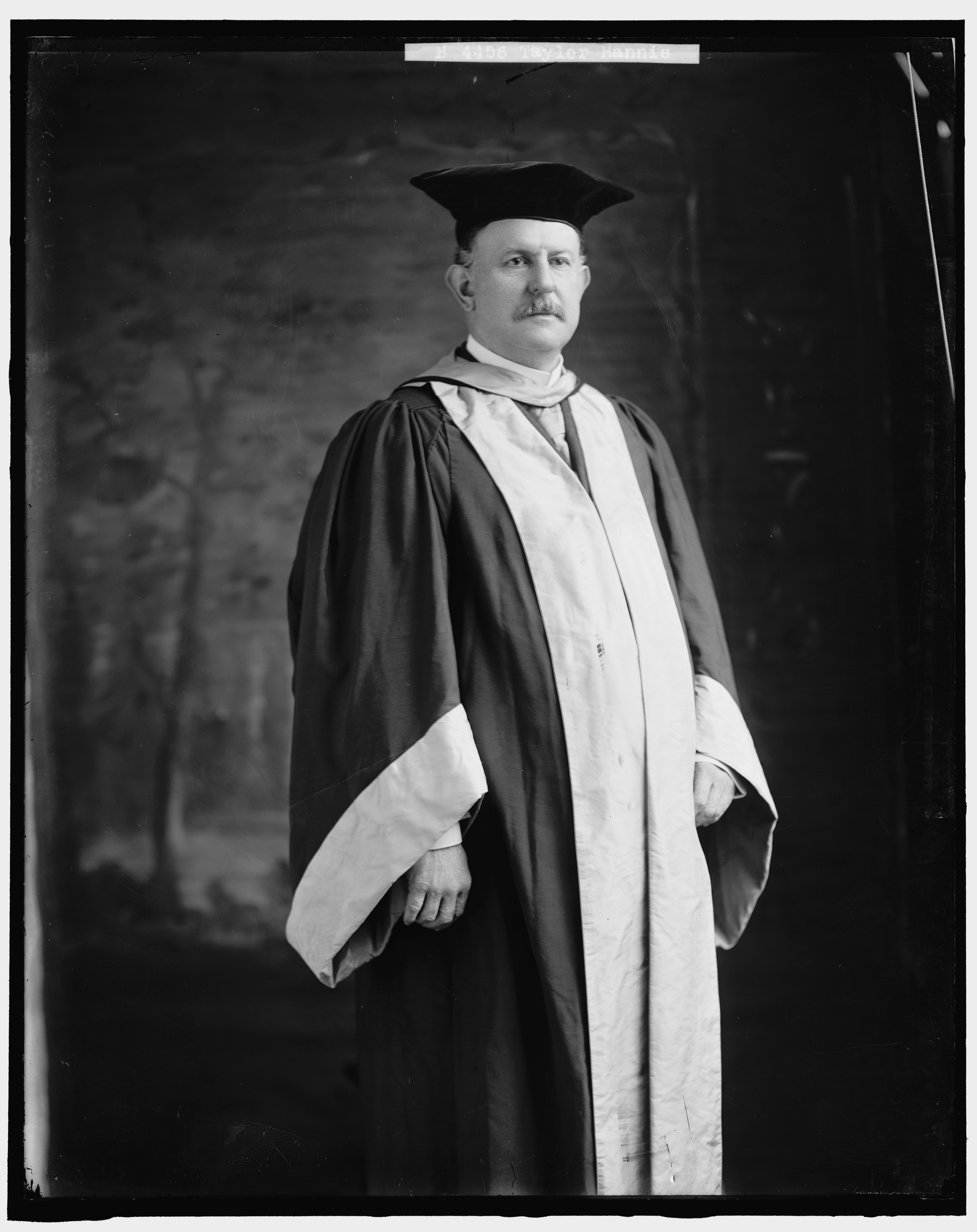
- Taylor, 1905–1922

30th United States Minister to Spain
- In office July 1, 1893 – September 13, 1897
- President: Grover Cleveland
- Preceded by: A. Loudon Snowden
- Succeeded by: Stewart L. Woodford

Personal details
- Born: September 12, 1851 New Bern, North Carolina
- Died: December 26, 1922 (aged 71) Washington, D.C.
- Party: Democratic Party
- Education: University of North Carolina at Chapel Hill
- Occupation: Lawyer and writer

Hannis Taylor (September 12, 1851 – December 26, 1922) was an American diplomat, lawyer, and writer.

== Biography ==
=== Early life ===
Taylor was born in New Bern, North Carolina, on September 12, 1851. His mother contracted tuberculosis when he was 18, resulting in Taylor, his 6 siblings, and his parents moving to southern Alabama in search of a better climate; she died shortly after leaving a distressed father and Taylor left to take care of his family. He received a degree from the University of North Carolina at Chapel Hill before moving to Mobile, Alabama, where he was admitted to the Bar.

He worked for 15 years as a lawyer in Mobile before publishing his first volume of The Origin and Growth of the English Constitution in 1889. Although he was not considered a successful lawyer, his writing career and connections within the Democratic party earned him notoriety and the presidency of the Alabama State Bar.

=== Ambassadorship ===
Between 1893 and 1897, Taylor served as Envoy extraordinary and minister plenipotentiary of the United States to the Spanish Empire. His selection by President Cleveland, was done to incorporate the New South and appease expansionist, Democrat leader Senator John Tyler Morgan. Morgan's candidate was a surprising choice, due to his inability to speak Spanish and lack of familiarity with international law.

Originally Taylor showed greater interest in advancing his constitutional studies, but he would quickly take on the expansionist role Morgan hoped for abroad, pushing American interests and never backing down from Spanish pressure. He would first be tested when the Mora case was reopened as the Spanish Cortes blocked payments conceded by Foreign Minister Segismundo Moret over illegally confiscated land from a naturalized U.S. citizen.

Later in his term, in 1896, Taylor would butt heads with the Spanish government again. Antonio Cánovas del Castillo instructed then Foreign Minister Carlos O'Donnell to solicit European support against the eventuality of the U.S. invading Cuba and the Monroe Doctrine. In the Summer of that year, O'Donnell drafted a memorandum that stated American intervention would ultimately result in the destabilizing and overthrowing of the Spanish Monarchy and its colonial holdings, which would in turn spread to the rest of Europe. Taylor would become aware of this through the British Ambassador to Spain, Henry Drummond Wolff, who revealed the plans to him. Taylor would then respond by warning O'Donnell that, should he continue with the plot, the Cleveland administration would perceive it as a hostile action which saw the memorandum scrapped. That same year, Taylor would seek compromise by requesting Spain grant semi-autonomy to Cuba under the rule of Cánovas del Castillo.

During this period he would work on a second volume of The Origin and Growth of the English Constitution which was published in 1898. After his assignment, Taylor was called before President McKinley to give his impressions of Spain's American policy, especially with regarding Cuba. During this meeting, he advocated for American intervention to the president.

In November 1897 former President Cleveland gave this assessment of Taylor in a letter to former Attorney General Richard Olney: "I am thoroughly disgusted with Hannis Taylor. I’d give a month’s salary as President if I was in the White House and he was in Madrid. What a satisfaction it would be to bounce him. It is an aggravating thing to have to put up with his general inefficiency, and find out last that he is not even a gentleman. Well: He’s another of our Southern men of “high character” who – if appointed “will reflect credit on the administration.” He wrote that he intended to come to see me. I hope not."

=== Post-Ambassadorship ===
In 1901 Taylor published A Treatise on International Public Law describing cases and doctrines such as the Caroline test, detailing in the latter its necessity. The next year, in 1902, he moved his family to Washington, D.C., after two failed campaigns for the United States Congress.

Taylor would later publish several additional works: The Science of Jurisprudence in 1908 and 1911 a final volume for The Origin and Growth of the English Constitution.

On December 26, 1922, Taylor died in Washington D.C. at his home.
