= Henry W. Genet =

American politician (1828–1889)

Henry Webb Genet (February 27, 1828 – September 6, 1889) was an American lawyer and politician from New York.

== Life ==
Genet was born in Wethersfield, Connecticut, the son of John M. Genet, a French immigrant. The family moved to Albany, New York, when Henry was still an infant. He attended school in Albany, Glens Falls Academy, and New York University. Then he studied law, was admitted to the bar, and practiced in New York City.

=== Public office ===
He was a Councilman of New York (7th District) in 1858; an Alderman (17th District) from 1859 to 1863; and President of the Board of Aldermen in 1861. He was Clerk of New York County from 1862 to 1864.

He was a member of the New York State Assembly (New York County, 21st District) in 1867. He was a member of the New York State Senate (8th District) from 1868 to 1871, sitting in the 91st, 92nd, 93rd and 94th New York State Legislatures.

=== Conviction ===
Genet was a member of the Tweed Ring and was convicted in December 1873 for "having, by false and fraudulent means, obtained the signature of Mayor A. Oakey Hall to a warrant for $4,802 for the payment of iron-work alleged to have been supplied by J. McBride Davidson for the Harlem Courthouse." Though Genet had been elected to the State Assembly of 1874, he could not take office after his conviction, so a special election to fill the vacancy was held on January 20, 1874.

Sheriff Matthew T. Brennan let Genet escape and spent 30 days in jail himself. Genet fled to Canada and then to Europe. In 1878, Genet returned to New York City and surrendered himself. In 1881, he was sentenced to eight months in jail, served his time, and paid a fine of $9,604.

== Death ==
On September 6, 1889, he died of cancer at his home at 100 West 124th Street in New York City and was buried at the Woodlawn Cemetery in The Bronx.

New York State Assembly
Preceded by new district	New York State Assembly; New York County, 21st District; 1867	Succeeded by William Hitchman
New York State Senate
Preceded by Edmund G. Sutherland	New York State Senate; 8th District; 1868–1871	Succeeded by Daniel F. Tiemann
