= Nicholas B. La Bau =

American lawyer and politician

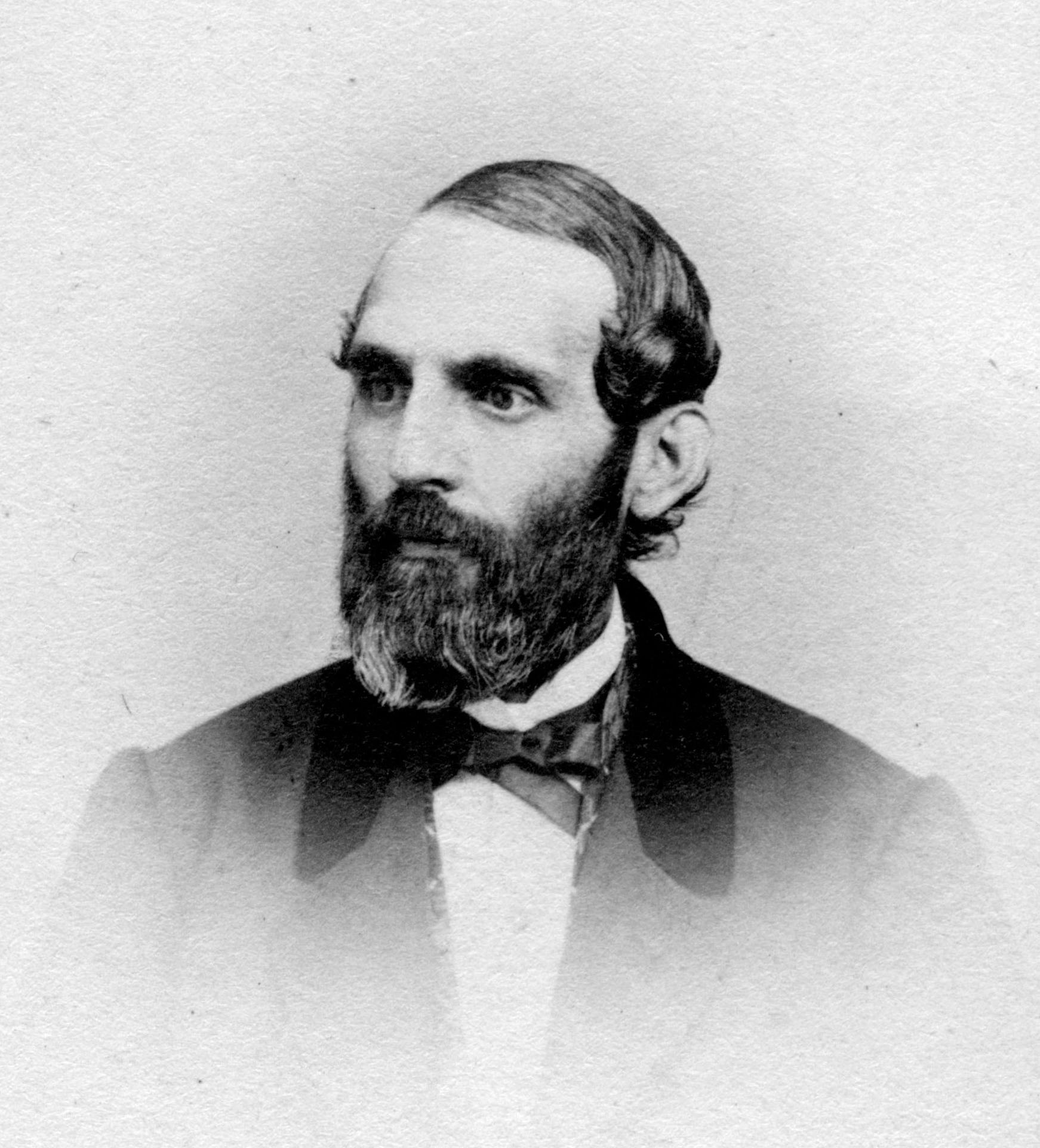
- Born: July 29, 1823; Trenton, New Jersey
- Died: November 1, 1873 (aged 50); New York City
- Spouse: Mary Alicia Vanderbilt

Nicholas Bergasse La Bau (July 29, 1823 – November 1, 1873) was an American lawyer and politician from New York.

== Life ==
He was born on July 29, 1823, in Trenton, New Jersey. He graduated from Columbia College in 1844. Then he studied law, was admitted to the bar, and practiced until 1859 when he retired due to ill health. He was a lieutenant colonel of the State Militia.

He married Mary Alicia Vanderbilt (1834–1902), a daughter of Cornelius Vanderbilt, and they had several children. They lived on Staten Island. By 1863, he had recovered his health sufficiently to enter politics. He ran twice unsuccessfully for the Assembly, but in 1865 he defeated the incumbent State Senator Robert Christie Jr. by a slim margin of about 70 votes. La Bau was a member of the New York State Senate (1st D.) in 1866 and 1867. Afterwards he bought a house in Luzerne, Warren County, and was a member of the New York State Assembly (Warren Co.) in 1868 and 1869.

He died on November 1, 1873, in New York City.

== Sources ==
New York State Senate
Preceded by Robert Christie Jr.	New York State Senate; 1st District; 1866–1867	Succeeded by Lewis A. Edwards
New York State Assembly
Preceded by Columbus Gill	New York State Assembly; Warren County; 1868–1869	Succeeded by Godfrey R. Martine
