= 1870 New York state election =

- November 8, 1870

The 1870 New York state election was held on November 8, 1870, to elect the governor, the lieutenant governor, the New York State Comptroller, two Canal Commissioners and an Inspector of State Prisons, as well as all members of the New York State Assembly. This followed the 1870 New York special judicial election.

== History ==
The Republican state convention met on September 7 at Saratoga Springs, New York. Due to the factional struggle between the followers of Roscoe Conkling and Reuben E. Fenton, the Temporary Chairman was not proposed and adopted by acclamation, as traditionally done, but was elected. George William Curtis, the Conkling man, was chosen by the delegates (vote: Curtis 220, Van Wyck 150). Thereupon, Conkling proposed Charles H. Van Wyck, the Fenton man, as president, which was adopted. Stewart L. Woodford was nominated for Governor on the second ballot (informal vote: Woodford 153, Horace Greeley 143, George William Curtis 104½; first ballot: Woodford 170½, Greeley 139, Curtis 87½; second ballot: Woodford 258, Greeley 105½, Curtis 20). DeWitt Clinton Littlejohn was nominated for Lieutenant Governor on the first ballot (vote: Littlejohn 196, Sigismund Kaufman 182). Abiah W. Palmer was nominated for Comptroller by acclamation. On September 8, Absalom Nelson, of Erie County, was nominated for Canal Commissioner (full term) by acclamation. Alexander Barkley was nominated for Canal Commissioner (short term) on the first ballot (vote: Barkley: 302, Alonzo N. Welch 82). Littlejohn declined to run and suggested the choice of Kaufman, who was then nominated. John Parkhurst, the Warden of Clinton State Prison, was nominated for Prison Inspector by acclamation.

== Result ==
The whole Democratic ticket, made up of the six incumbent officers, was re-elected.

65 Democrats and 63 Republicans were elected for the session of 1871 to the New York State Assembly.

1870 state election results
| Office | Democratic ticket | | Republican ticket | |
|---|---|---|---|---|
| Governor | John T. Hoffman | 399,490 | Stewart L. Woodford | 366,424 |
| Lieutenant Governor | Allen C. Beach | 399,057 | Sigismund Kaufmann | 368,158 |
| Comptroller | Asher P. Nichols | 399,106 | Abiah W. Palmer | 368,358 |
| Canal Commissioner (full term) | John D. Fay | 390,468 | Absalom Nelson | 368,102 |
| Canal Commissioner (short term) | George W. Chapman | 390,350 | Alexander Barkley | 368,588 |
| Inspector of State Prisons | Solomon Scheu | 398,759 | John Parkhurst | 367,986 |

== See also ==
- New York gubernatorial elections

== Sources ==
- The Tickets: in NYT on October 30, 1870
- Results: Tribune Almanac 1871
