= Truman G. Younglove =

American politician

Truman Giles Younglove (October 31, 1815 Edinburg, Saratoga County, New York – September 17, 1882) was an American civil engineer and politician who served four years on the New York State Assembly.

== Business career ==
Younglove was for many years in charge of the construction of the great dam and elaborate system of canals at Cohoes, New York which provided the water power to the cotton mills. He became head of the water power company and supervised the construction of Mill #3 of the Harmony Mills. He was an incorporator of the Cohoes Savings Institution and the first treasurer, also director of the First National Bank of Cohoes, from its organization to his death.

== Political role ==
He was a member of the New York State Assembly (Saratoga Co., 1st D.) in 1866, 1867, 1868 and 1869; and was Speaker in 1869.

He was a delegate to the Republican National Convention in 1868 and Temporary Chairman of the Liberal Republican state convention of 1872.

== Family ==
Younglove was the son of Daniel Copeland Younglove (1791–1867) and Elizabeth Stimson Younglove (1793–1850). He married first Elizabeth MacMartin on January 7, 1841; and then Jane MacMartin on November 4, 1850.

His son Truman Giles Younglove Jr. (1858–1920) was accused in 1883 of embezzlement while Secretary and Treasurer of the Cohoes Straw Board Co., and fled to Illinois.

Assemblywoman Maude E. Ten Eyck (1902–1977) was his great-granddaughter.

He was buried at Albany Rural Cemetery in Menands, New York in 1882.

New York State Assembly
Preceded by George W. Chapman	New York State Assembly; Saratoga County, 1st District; 1866-1869	Succeeded by Isaiah Fuller
Political offices
Preceded by William Hitchman	Speaker of the New York State Assembly; 1869	Succeeded by William Hitchman
