= 1870 Nebraska gubernatorial election =

- October 11, 1870

Nominee	David Butler	John H. Croxton
Party	Republican	Democratic
Popular vote	11,126	8,648
Percentage	56.27%	43.73%
- County results Butler: 50–60% 60–70% 70–80% 80–90% 90–100% Croxton: 50–60% 60–70% 70–80% No Data/Votes
Governor before election
David Butler
Republican
Elected Governor
David Butler
Republican

The 1870 Nebraska gubernatorial election was held on October 11, 1870. (Note: The Nebraska Constitution of 1866 specified in Article III, Section 1, that the governor and all executive officers were to be elected on the second Tuesday in October.) Two-term incumbent Governor of Nebraska David Butler, the Republican nominee, was seeking a third term as governor. He was opposed by Democratic nominee John H. Croxton, a lawyer from Nebraska City.

== General election ==
=== Candidates ===
- David Butler, Republican candidate, incumbent Governor of Nebraska
- John H. Croxton, Democratic candidate, lawyer and former city attorney of Nebraska City

=== Results ===
Nebraska gubernatorial election, 1870
Party	Candidate	Votes	%
Republican	David Butler	11,126	56.27%
Democratic	John H. Croxton	8,648	43.73%
Total votes		19,774	100.0%
Republican hold			

== Aftermath ==
Shortly after David Butler took office for his third term in 1871, eleven articles of impeachment were filed against him by the Nebraska Legislature. Eventually Butler was removed from office on June 2, 1871, and William H. James took over as acting Governor.
