= 1867 Wisconsin lieutenant gubernatorial election =

- November 5, 1867
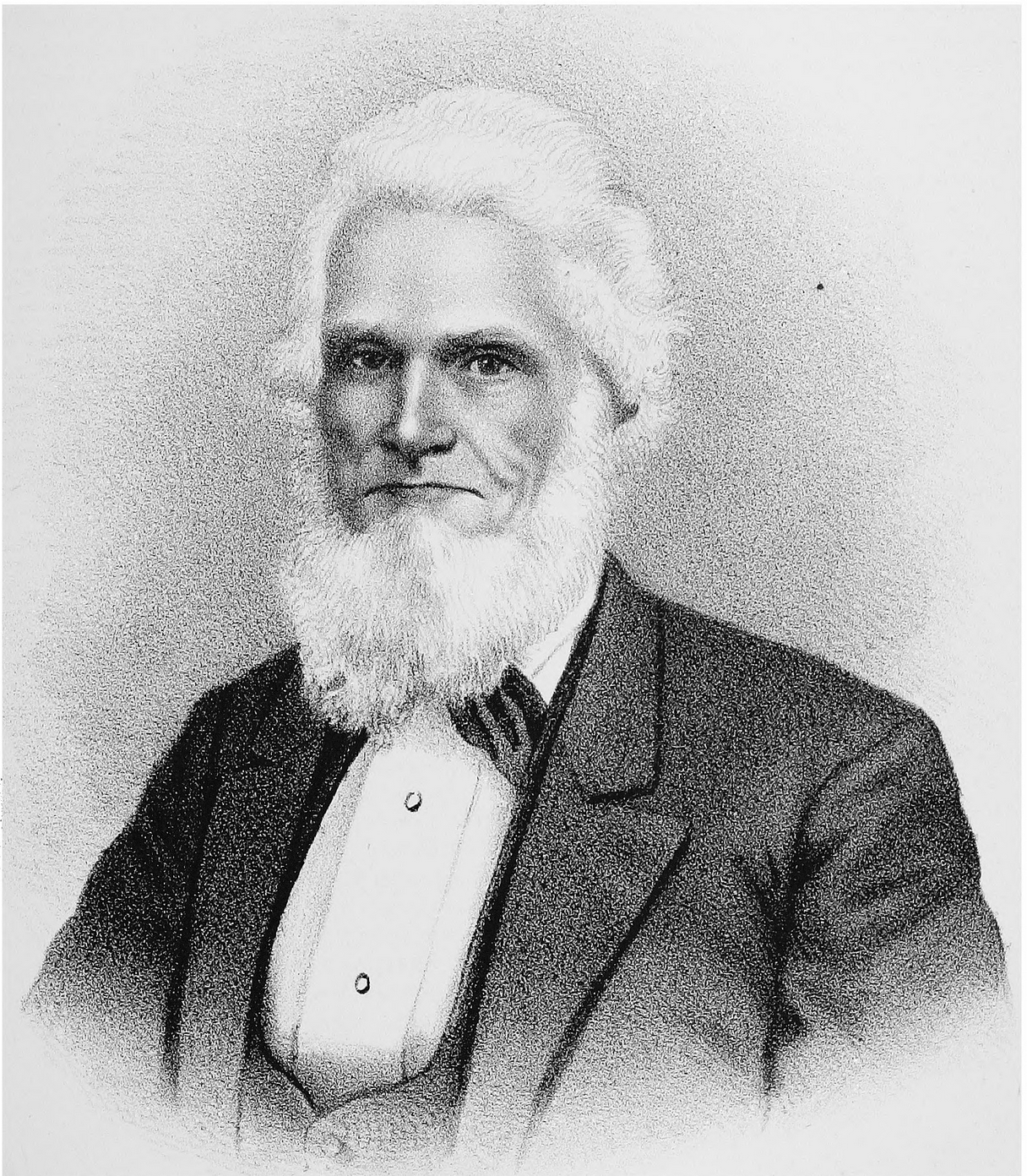

| Nominee | Wyman Spooner | Gilbert H. Park |
| Party | Republican | Democratic |
| Popular vote | 73,419 | 68,996 |
| Percentage | 51.55% | 48.44% |
Lieutenant Governor before election
Wyman Spooner
Republican
Elected Lieutenant Governor
Wyman Spooner
Republican

The 1867 Wisconsin lieutenant gubernatorial election was held on November 5, 1867, in order to elect the lieutenant governor of Wisconsin. Incumbent Republican lieutenant governor Wyman Spooner defeated Democratic nominee Gilbert H. Park. This election marked the first time in the state's history a lieutenant governor was elected to a third term.

== General election ==
On election day, November 5, 1867, incumbent Republican lieutenant governor Wyman Spooner won re-election by a margin of 4,423 votes against his opponent Democratic nominee Gilbert H. Park, thereby retaining Republican control over the office of lieutenant governor. Spooner was sworn in for his third term on January 6, 1868.

=== Results ===
Wisconsin lieutenant gubernatorial election, 1867
| Party | Candidate | Votes | % |
|---|---|---|---|
| Republican | Wyman Spooner (incumbent) | 73,419 | 51.55 |
| Democratic | Gilbert H. Park | 68,996 | 48.44 |
| | Scattering | 10 | 0.01 |
| Total votes | | 142,425 | 100.00 |
| Republican hold | | | |
