= 1867 California lieutenant gubernatorial election =

- September 4, 1867

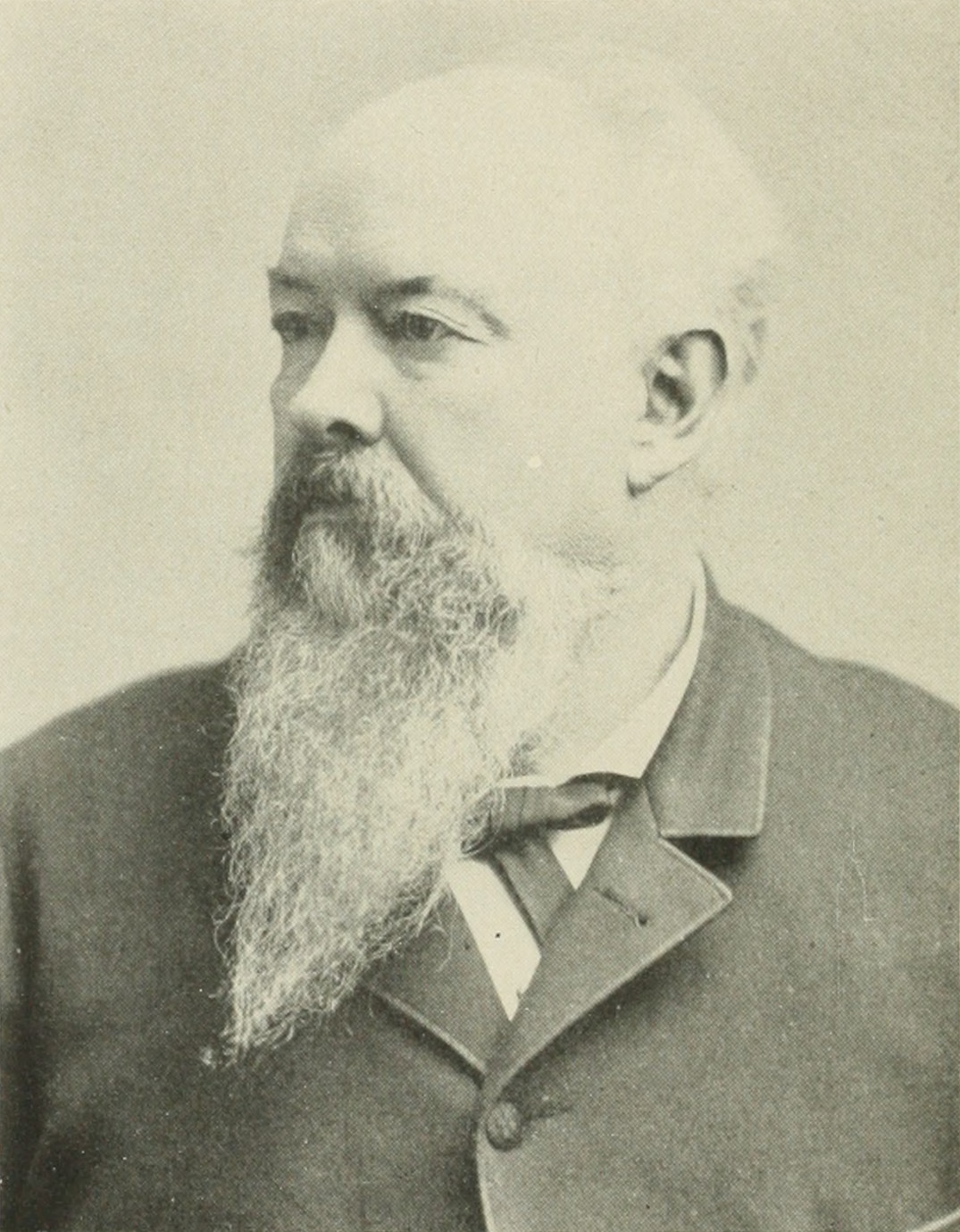
Nominee	William Holden	John P. Jones
Party	Democratic	National Union
Popular vote	47,969	44,584
Percentage	51.83%	48.17%
County results
Holden
50–60%
60–70%
70–80%
80–90%
Jones
50–60%
60–70%
No Data
Lieutenant Governor before election
Tim N. Machin
National Union
Elected Lieutenant Governor
William Holden
Democratic

The 1867 California lieutenant gubernatorial election was held on September 4, 1867, in order to elect the lieutenant governor of California. Democratic nominee and former member of the California State Assembly William Holden defeated National Union nominee and former member of the California State Senate John P. Jones.

== General election ==
On election day, September 4, 1867, Democratic nominee William Holden won the election by a margin of 3,385 votes against his opponent National Union nominee John P. Jones, thereby gaining Democratic control over the office of lieutenant governor. Holden was sworn in as the 11th lieutenant governor of California on December 5, 1867.

=== Results ===
California lieutenant gubernatorial election, 1867
Party	Candidate	Votes	%
Democratic	William Holden	47,969	51.83
National Union	John P. Jones	44,584	48.17
Total votes		92,553	100.00
Democratic gain from National Union			
