= Canterbury Hall (New York City) =

Building in Manhattan, New York

- Interactive map of the Canterbury Hall area

General information
- Coordinates: 40°43′37″N 73°59′44″W
- Demolished: 1861

Canterbury Hall was an edifice located at 663 Broadway in the 19th century. It was used for entertainment and political meetings. It was a three-story building where bawdy concerts took place. The building had a front of 40 feet and a depth of 125 feet.

== History ==
Often called Mozart Hall, it was also a gathering place of anti-Tammany Hall political forces in New York City. Fernando Wood, New York Mayor and Congressman, founded the organization in 1858. The Hall practically passed out of existence after Wood resigned from its leadership on August 3, 1868, and rejoined Tammany Hall. The edifice burned entirely in the early morning hours of March 24, 1861.

Proceedings at the venue were frowned upon by newspaper writers such as one from The New York Times. He commented about Canterbury Hall advertisements promoting the prettiest waiter girls in town. Along with a rival theater, the Melodeon, the establishment was "a nightly disgrace to Broadway and its adjacent streets". In November 1860 the proprietors of the business, Fox & Curran, were compelled to pay a license fee of $500 to keep the venue open. A New York Times editorialist expressed the opinion that this was a first measure in ridding the city of such nuisances, which he predicted the New York State Legislature would soon entirely eliminate.

The property on which Canterbury Hall stood was formerly owned by a Reverend Wiley. His estate encompassed additional buildings on Broadway and was insured for $15,000. The fire which consumed the structure began among stage scenery and was discovered by watchmen. The owners of Canterbury Hall suffered an estimated loss of $10,000. A fire marshal began an investigation into the cause of the fire which was considered to be of incendiary origin.
