= 1870 Nevada gubernatorial election =

- November 8, 1870

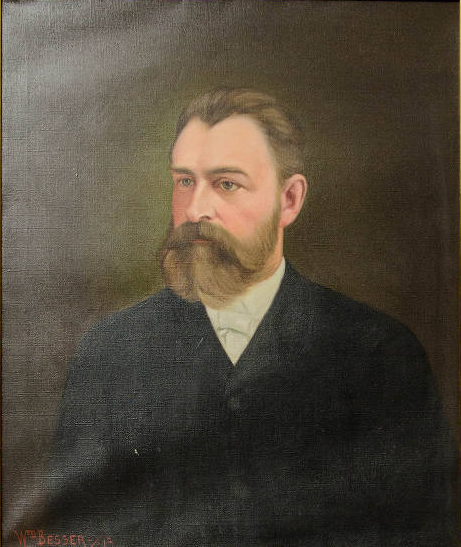
Nominee	Lewis R. Bradley	Frederick Augustus Tritle
Party	Democratic	Republican
Popular vote	7,200	6,148
Percentage	53.94%	46.06%
- County results Bradley: 50–60% 60–70% Tritle: 50–60% No Data/Vote
Governor before election
Henry G. Blasdel
Republican
Elected Governor
Lewis R. Bradley
Democratic

The 1870 Nevada gubernatorial election was held on November 8, 1870, in order to elect the Governor of Nevada. The Democratic nominee Lewis R. Bradley won the election against Republican nominee and Nevada State Senator Frederick Augustus Tritle.

== General election ==
On election day, November 8, 1870, Democratic nominee Lewis R. Bradley won the election by a margin of 1,052 votes against his opponent Republican nominee Frederick Augustus Tritle, thereby gaining Democratic control over the office of Governor from the Republicans. Bradley was sworn in as the 2nd Governor of Nevada on January 3, 1871.

=== Results ===
Nevada gubernatorial election, 1870
Party	Candidate	Votes	%	±%
Democratic	Lewis R. Bradley	7,200	53.94%	+9.47%
Republican	Frederick Augustus Tritle	6,148	46.06%	−9.47%
Write-in	James S. Slingerland	1	0.01%	+0.01%
Majority		1,052	7.88%	
Total votes		13,349	100.00%	
Democratic gain from Republican		Swing	+18.93%	

=== Results by county ===
County	Lewis R. Bradley Democratic		Frederick Augustus Tritle Republican		James S. Slingerland Write-in		Margin		Total votes cast
County	#	%	#	%	#	%	#	%	Total votes cast
Churchill	48	61.54%	30	38.46%	0	0.00%	18	23.08%	78
Douglas	251	56.03%	197	43.97%	0	0.00%	54	12.05%	448
Elko	693	56.99%	523	43.01%	0	0.00%	170	13.98%	1,216
Esmeralda	254	53.93%	217	46.07%	0	0.00%	37	7.86%	471
Humboldt	437	59.46%	298	40.54%	0	0.00%	139	18.91%	735
Lander	886	60.56%	577	39.44%	0	0.00%	309	21.12%	1,463
Lyon	479	59.50%	326	40.50%	0	0.00%	153	19.01%	805
Lyon	270	44.70%	334	55.30%	0	0.00%	-64	-10.60%	604
Nye	353	52.22%	323	47.78%	0	0.00%	30	4.44%	676
Ormsby	454	52.49%	411	47.51%	0	0.00%	43	4.97%	865
Storey	1,742	52.72%	1,562	47.28%	0	0.00%	180	5.45%	3,304
Washoe	499	52.09%	458	47.81%	1	0.10%	41	4.28%	958
White Pine	834	48.32%	892	51.68%	0	0.00%	-58	3.36%	1,726
Totals	7,200	53.94%	6,148	46.06%	1	0.01%	1,052	7.88%	13,349

==== Counties that flipped from Republican to Democratic ====
- Churchill
- Douglas
- Esmeralda
- Humboldt
- Lander
- Nye
- Ormsby
- Storey
- Washoe

== Sources ==
- Goff, John S. (1978). Arizona Territorial Officials Volume II: The Governors 1863–1912. Cave Creek, Arizona: Black Mountain Press. OCLC 5100411.
