= 1870 Kansas gubernatorial election =

- November 8, 1870
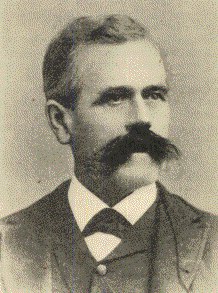

Nominee	James M. Harvey	Isaac Sharp
Party	Republican	Democratic
Popular vote	40,667	20,496
Percentage	66.37%	33.45%
- County results Harvey: 50–60% 60–70% 70–80% 80–90% >90% Sharp: 50–60% 60–70% 70–80% Tie: 50% No Data/Vote
Governor before election
James M. Harvey
Republican
Elected Governor
James M. Harvey
Republican

The 1870 Kansas gubernatorial election was held on November 8, 1870, in order to elect the Governor of Kansas. Incumbent Republican Governor of Kansas James M. Harvey defeated Democratic nominee Isaac Sharp.

== General election ==
On election day, November 8, 1870, Republican nominee James M. Harvey won re-election by a margin of 20,171 votes against his opponent Democratic nominee Isaac Sharp, thereby retaining Republican control over the office of Governor. Harvey was sworn in for his second term on January 13, 1871.

=== Results ===
Kansas gubernatorial election, 1870
Party	Candidate	Votes	%
Republican	James M. Harvey (incumbent)	40,667	66.37
Democratic	Isaac Sharp	20,496	33.45
	Scattering	108	0.18
Total votes		61,271	100.00
Republican hold			
