= 1867 Portuguese legislative election =

- 4 February 1867

All 177 seats in the Chamber of Deputies 89 seats needed for a majority
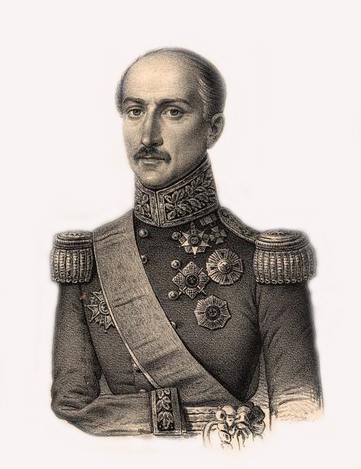

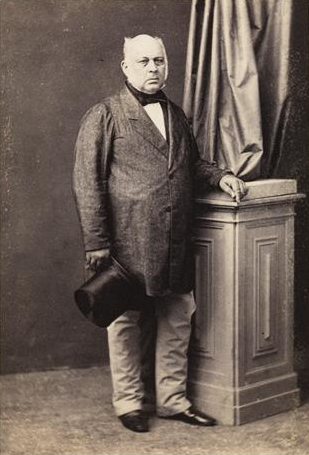
	First party	Second party
Leader	1st Marquis of Sá da Bandeira	Joaquim António de Aguiar
Party	Opposition	CEC
Result	Won the most seats	Formed government
Prime Minister before election
Joaquim António de Aguiar
Regenerator
Prime Minister after election
Joaquim António de Aguiar
Regenerator

Parliamentary elections were held in Portugal on 4 February 1867. The result was a victory for the opposition, but the government of Joaquim António de Aguiar remained in power until early 1868, following the Janeirinha uprising.

== Results ==
The result was a victory for the opposition, which consisted of the Liberal-Progressive Group and the People's Party. The government, consisting of the Regenerator Party and Historic Party, contested the elections as the 'Electoral Commission of the Centre'.
