= 1867 Faroese general election =

Danish territorial election

Partial general elections were held in the Faroe Islands in 1867 to elect nine of the eighteen elected members of the Løgting. The Danish administrator (Amtmaður) and the local dean (Próstur) were also members, with the administrator serving as the speaker.

== Electoral system ==
Members of the Løgting were elected by first-past-the-post voting, with voters having as many votes as there were seats available in their constituency. Nine of the 18 seats were elected every two years. Voting was restricted to men aged 25 or over who met certain tax-paying criteria.

== Results ==
Constituency	Elected members	Notes
Eysturoy	Hans Jacobsen	
Eysturoy	Gregorius Johannesen	Re-elected
Eysturoy	Johannes Petersen	Re-elected
Eysturoy	Sámal Jákup Weihe	
Norðurstreymoy	Joen Hansen	
Norðurstreymoy	Thomas Egholm	
Suðurstreymoy	Andreas Christian Lützen	
Vágar	Heine Heinesen	
Vágar	Zacharias Nielsen	Re-elected
Source: Løgting
