= 1867 Connecticut lieutenant gubernatorial election =

- April 1, 1867

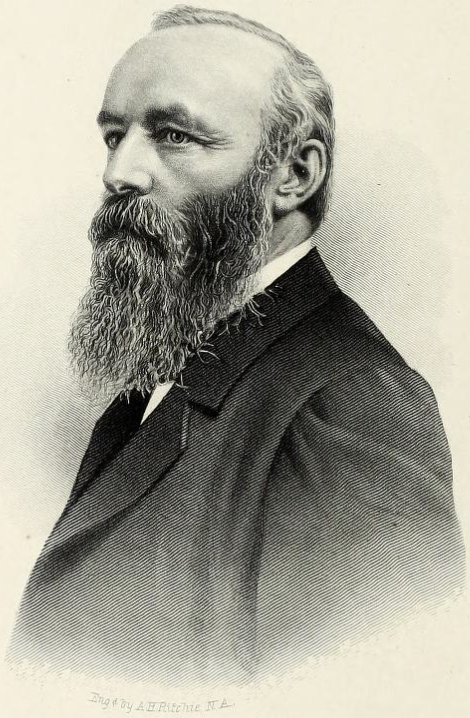
Nominee	Ephraim H. Hyde	Oliver Henry Perry
Party	Democratic	Republican
Popular vote	47,407	46,808
Percentage	50.30%	49.70%
Lieutenant Governor before election
Oliver Winchester
Republican
Elected Lieutenant Governor
Ephraim H. Hyde
Democratic

The 1867 Connecticut lieutenant gubernatorial election was held in the US state on April 1, 1867, to elect the lieutenant governor of Connecticut. Democratic nominee Ephraim H. Hyde won the election against Republican nominee and former Speaker of the Connecticut House of Representatives Oliver Henry Perry.

== General election ==
On election day, April 1, 1867, Democratic nominee Ephraim H. Hyde won the election with 50.30% of the vote, thereby gaining Democratic control over the office of lieutenant governor. Hyde was sworn in as the 53rd lieutenant governor of Connecticut on May 1, 1867.

=== Results ===
Connecticut lieutenant gubernatorial election, 1867
Party	Candidate	Votes	%
Democratic	Ephraim H. Hyde	47,407	50.30
Republican	Oliver Henry Perry	46,808	49.70
	Scattering	1	0.00
Total votes		94,216	100.00
Democratic gain from Republican			
