= 1868 New York state election =

- November 3, 1868

The 1868 New York state election was held on November 3, 1868, to elect the governor, the lieutenant governor, a Canal Commissioner, an Inspector of State Prisons and the Clerk of the Court of Appeals, as well as all members of the New York State Assembly.

== History ==
The Republican state convention met on July 8 at Syracuse, New York. Henry Smith was Temporary Chairman until the choice of John Cochrane as president. John A. Griswold was nominated for governor on the first ballot (vote: Griswold 247, Horace Greeley 95, Stewart L. Woodford 36). Alonzo B. Cornell was nominated for lieutenant governor on the first ballot (vote: Cornell 219, Augustus Frank 88, Franz Sigel 6). Alexander Barkley for Canal Commissioner, the incumbent Prison Inspector Henry A. Barnum, and Campbell H. Young for Clerk of the Court of Appeals, were nominated by acclamation.

The Democratic state convention met on September 2 and 3 at Tweddle Hall in Albany, New York. H. O. Cheesbro was temporary chairman until the choice of Robert Earl as president. Mayor of New York City John T. Hoffman, the Democratic candidate of 1866, was nominated again for governor by acclamation. Allen C. Beach was nominated for lieutenant governor after an informal ballot (vote: Beach 68, Albert P. Lanning 47, William J. Averill 9, S. T. Ahnot 1).

A German Democratic state convention met on September 2 at Schreiber's Hotel in Albany, New York with Henry Clausenger as president, and endorsed the nomination of John T. Hoffman for governor.

== Result ==
The whole Democratic ticket was elected.

The incumbent Barnum was defeated.

75 Republicans and 53 Democrats were elected for the session of 1869 to the New York State Assembly.

This was the last time the Clerk of the Court of Appeals was elected. At this time, the term was three years, and the next election of the Clerk would occur in 1871, but in 1870 the Court of Appeals was re-organized and the office became appointive.

1868 state election results
Office	Democratic ticket		Republican ticket	
Governor	John T. Hoffman	439,301	John A. Griswold	411,355
Lieutenant Governor	Allen C. Beach	439,327	Alonzo B. Cornell	411,670
Canal Commissioner	Oliver Bascom	439,126	Alexander Barkley	411,522
Inspector of State Prisons	David B. McNeil	438,784	Henry A. Barnum	411,850
Clerk of the Court of Appeals	Edwin O. Perrin	438,357	Campbell H. Young	412,080

== See also ==
- New York gubernatorial elections

== Sources ==
- Result in The Tribune Almanac for 1869 compiled by Horace Greeley of the New York Tribune
- Result: Official Canvass of the Vote on the State Ticket of New-York in NYT on December 8, 1868
