= Stewart L. Woodford =

American politician (1835–1913)

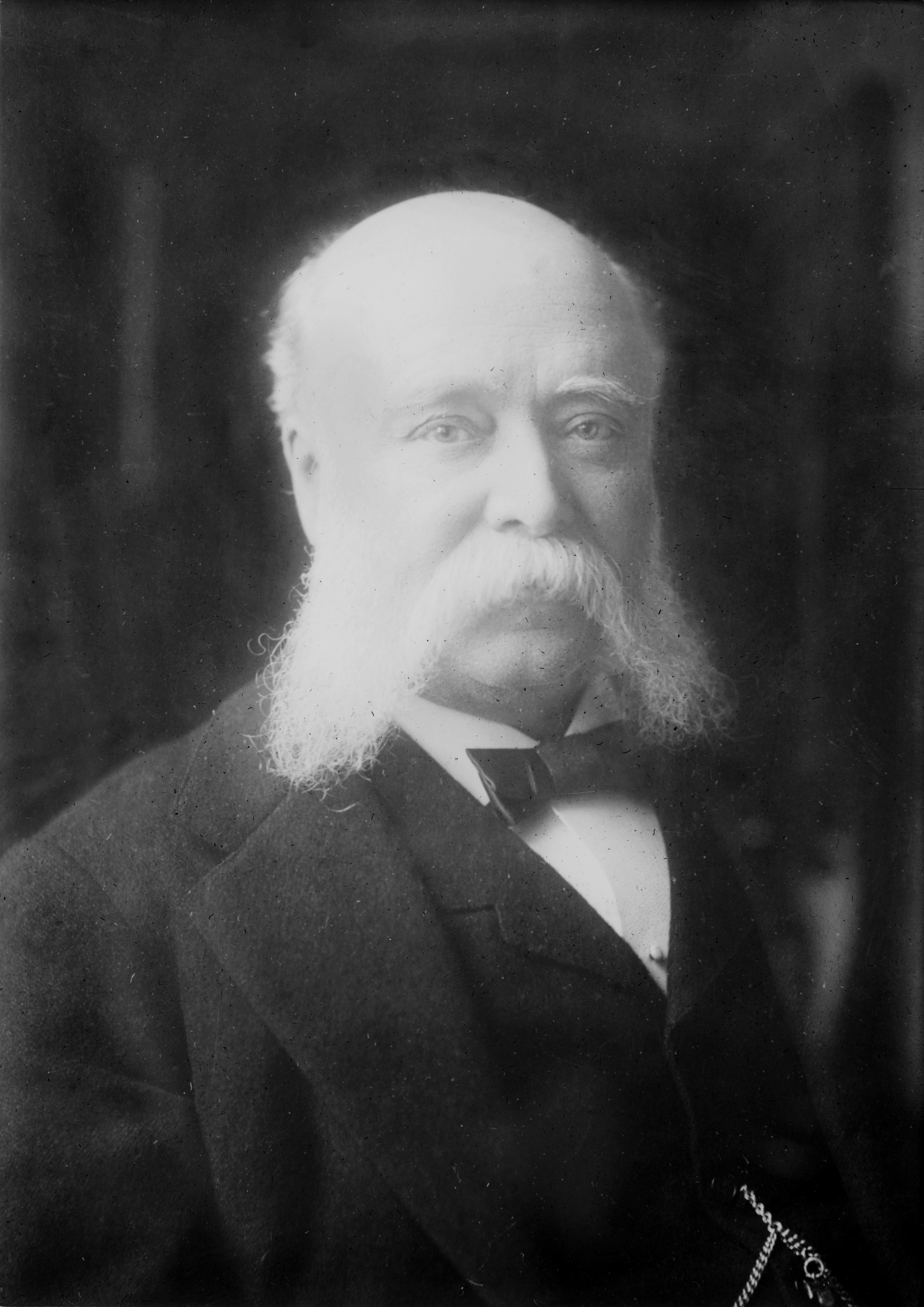

31st United States Minister to Spain
- In office June 19, 1897 – April 21, 1898
- President: William McKinley
- Preceded by: Hannis Taylor
- Succeeded by: Bellamy Storer

United States Attorney for the Southern District of New York
- In office January 24, 1877 – March 12, 1883
- President: See list: Ulysses S. Grant Rutherford B. Hayes James A. Garfield Chester A. Arthur
- Preceded by: George Bliss, Jr.
- Succeeded by: Elihu Root

Member of the U.S. House of Representatives from New York's 3rd district
- In office March 4, 1873 – July 1, 1874
- Preceded by: Henry Warner Slocum
- Succeeded by: Simeon B. Chittenden

Lieutenant Governor of New York
- In office January 1, 1867 – December 31, 1868
- Governor: Reuben Fenton
- Preceded by: Thomas G. Alvord
- Succeeded by: Allen C. Beach

Personal details
- Born: September 3, 1835 New York City, U.S.
- Died: February 14, 1913 (aged 77) New York City, U.S.
- Party: Republican
- Education: Columbia University
- Occupation: Attorney

Military service
- Allegiance: Union
- Branch/service: Union Army
- Years of service: 1862–1865
- Rank: Colonel; Brevet Brigadier General
- Commands: 103rd U.S. Colored Infantry Regiment
- Battles/wars: American Civil War

Stewart Lyndon Woodford (September 3, 1835 – February 14, 1913) was an American attorney and politician who served as a member of the United States House of Representatives and the lieutenant governor of New York.

Born in New York City, Woodford graduated from Columbia University in 1854, studied law, and attained admission to the bar. Becoming active in politics as a Republican, he served as Assistant United States Attorney for New York's Southern District from 1861 until volunteering for the Union Army in 1862. Woodford took part in the American Civil War as chief of staff to Quincy A. Gillmore, commander of the Department of the South, and as commander of the 103rd Colored Infantry Regiment. He attained the rank of colonel and the brevet rank of brigadier general.

Woodford ran successfully for lieutenant governor in 1866 and served from 1867 to 1868. After losing the 1870 race for governor, in 1872, Woodford was elected to the U.S. House, and he served a partial term. From 1877 to 1883, he served as United States Attorney for the Southern District of New York, and he served as Minister to Spain from 1897 until the start of hostilities during the Spanish–American War. Woodford died in New York City in 1913, and was buried in Stamford, Connecticut.

== Early life and education ==
He studied at Yale University and Columbia College, now Columbia University. He graduated from Columbia in 1854, and was a member of St. Anthony Hall. He then studied law, awas admitted to the bar in 1857, and commenced practice in New York City.

== Career ==
In 1860, he was chosen as the messenger of the electoral college for New York state to convey to Washington, D.C. its vote in favor of the presidency of Abraham Lincoln. In 1861, he was appointed U.S. assistant district attorney for the U.S. Southern District of New York. He held this office for approximately 18 months.

=== Union Army ===
In 1862, during the American Civil War, he joined the Union Army as a volunteer, serving until 1865, during which time he became in succession chief of staff to Gen. Quincy A. Gillmore in the Department of the South, and military commandant of Charleston, South Carolina, and Savannah, Georgia. He became colonel of the 103rd Regiment of U.S. Colored Infantry. On January 13, 1866, U.S. President Andrew Johnson nominated Woodford for the award of the honorary grade of brevet brigadier general of volunteers, to rank from May 12, 1865, and the U. S. Senate confirmed the award on March 12, 1866.

=== Lieutenant governor of New York ===
He was the Lieutenant Governor of New York from 1867 to 1868, elected in 1866 on the Republican ticket with Governor Reuben E. Fenton. In 1870, Woodford was the Republican candidate for Governor but was defeated by the incumbent Democrat John T. Hoffman.

=== U.S. Congress ===
In 1872, he was elected as a Republican to the 43rd United States Congress and served from March 4, 1873, to July 1, 1874. Also in 1872 he was chosen to be a presidential elector.

=== U.S. federal attorney ===
He was U.S. Attorney for the Southern District of New York from 1877 to 1883.

=== U.S. envoy to Spain ===
In June 1897, President William McKinley appointed Woodford to the post of Envoy Extraordinary and Minister Plenipotentiary to Spain. Spain severed diplomatic relations with the U.S. on April 21, 1898, and Woodford left his post the same day. The United States declared war on Spain as of that date by Act of Congress approved on April 25, 1898.

== Death ==
He died from heart disease at his home in New York City on February 14, 1913, and was interred in Woodland Cemetery in Stamford, Connecticut.

== Memberships ==
General Woodford was a companion of the New York Commandery of the Military Order of the Loyal Legion of the United States and was also a member of the General Society of Colonial Wars and Sons of the American Revolution. While a member of the Military Order of Foreign Wars in New York, he proposed COL Teddy Roosevelt for membership. He also served as the second Governor General of the Order of the Founders and Patriots of America from 1898 to 1900.

== See also ==
- Spanish–American War#Declaring war
- Teller Amendment

== Sources ==
- United States Congress. "Stewart L. Woodford (id: W000713)". Biographical Directory of the United States Congress.
- Eicher, John H., and David J. Eicher. Civil War High Commands. Stanford, CA: Stanford University Press, 2001. ISBN 0-8047-3641-3.
- Samuel R. Harlow, H. H. Boone (1867). Life Sketches of the State Officers, Senators, and Members of the Assembly …. Weed, Parsons & co. Life Sketches of State Officers
- Wilson, J. G.; Fiske, J., eds. (1900). "Woodford, Stewart Lyndon" . Appletons' Cyclopædia of American Biography. New York: D. Appleton.

Party political offices
| Preceded by John Augustus Griswold | Republican nominee for Governor of New York; 1870 | Succeeded by John Adams Dix |
Political offices
| Preceded by Thomas G. Alvord | Lieutenant Governor of New York; 1867–1868 | Succeeded by Allen C. Beach |
U.S. House of Representatives
| Preceded by Henry Warner Slocum | Member of the U.S. House of Representatives from New York's 3rd congressional district 1873–1874 | Succeeded by Simeon B. Chittenden |
Legal offices
| Preceded by George Bliss, Jr. | United States Attorney for the Southern District of New York; 1877–1883 | Succeeded by Elihu Root |
Diplomatic posts
| Preceded by Hannis Taylor | United States Minister to Spain; 1897–1898 | Succeeded by Bellamy Storer |
