= Oliver Bascom =

American businessman and politician

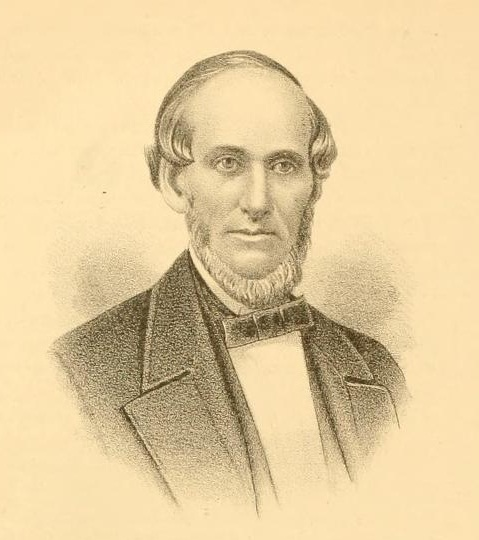
Oliver Bascom

Oliver Bascom (June 13, 1815 – November 7, 1869) was an American businessman and politician from New York.

== Life ==
He was born in West Haven, Rutland County, Vermont, the son of Josiah Bascom (1786–1863) and Betsey (Bottom) Bascom. The family removed to Whitehall, Washington County, New York, in 1824. He entered the transportation and forwarding business as a clerk and in 1841, opened his own company. On January 4, 1842, he married Almira Tanner (born 1822), and they had seven children. In 1851, he formed a partnership, Bascom, Vaughan & Co., which later became the Northern Transportation Line. In 1862, he retired from this company and went to California. Upon his return a short time later, he engaged in farming and the lumber business.

He served as Supervisor of the Town of Whitehall in 1851, 1852, 1864, and 1865.

In November 1868, he was elected on the Democratic ticket as a Canal Commissioner and took office on January 1, 1869.

He died ten months into his term.

== Sources ==
- Biographical Sketches of John T. Hoffman and Allen C. Beach (pages 106f)
- The Fitch Gazetteer: An Annotated Index to the Manuscript History of Washington County, New York by Kenneth A. Perry (Heritage Books, 1999, ISBN 0-7884-1182-9, ISBN 978-0-7884-1182-3)
- The Late Canal Commissioner Bascom in NYT on November 9, 1869
- History of Washington Co., New York by Crisfield Johnson (1878; pg. 475 and 491)
