= Allen C. Beach =

American politician (1825–1918)

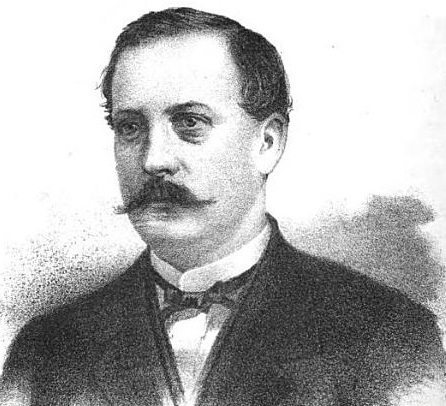
Allen C. Beach

Allen Carpenter Beach (October 9, 1825 – October 17, 1918) was an American lawyer and politician from New York who served the lieutenant governor of New York from 1869 to 1872.

== Life ==
He was born on October 9, 1825, in Fairfield, Herkimer County, New York, the son of Rev. Allen R. Beach (1797–1879) and Amy Brown Beach (1803–c.1890). He graduated from Union College in 1848, and was admitted to the bar in 1852. His first wife Abby A. Woodruff died in 1856. In 1862, he married Olivia H. Pickering, and they had one daughter, Amy.

Active in politics as a Democrat, Beach served as chairman of the Jefferson County Democratic Committee, and was a delegate to numerous county and state party conventions. Jefferson County was a Republican stronghold, and Beach ran unsuccessfully for several offices, including county judge. He was a delegate to the 1860 and 1876 Democratic National Conventions.

As a Democrat, he was Lieutenant Governor of New York from 1869 to 1872, elected in 1868 and 1870.

He was Secretary of State of New York from 1878 to 1879, elected in 1877 and defeated for re-election in 1879.

He died on October 17, 1918, in Rochester, New York.

== Sources ==
- Life Sketches of Executive Officers and Members of the Legislature of the State of New York by H. H. Boone & Theodore P. Cook (Weed, Parsons & Co., Albany NY, 1870; pg. 15–19)

Political offices
Preceded by Stewart L. Woodford	Lieutenant Governor of New York; 1869–1872	Succeeded by John C. Robinson
Preceded by John Bigelow	Secretary of State of New York; 1878–1879	Succeeded by Joseph Bradford Carr
Party political offices
Preceded by Samuel J. Tilden	New York State Democratic Committee Chairman; September 1874 – September 1875	Succeeded by Daniel Magone
