= National Register of Historic Places listings in Fulton County, New York =

Location of Fulton County in New York

List of the National Register of Historic Places listings in Fulton County, New York

This is intended to be a complete list of properties and districts listed on the National Register of Historic Places in Fulton County, New York. The locations of National Register properties and districts (at least for all showing latitude and longitude coordinates below) may be seen in a map by clicking on "Map of all coordinates". Two listings, Johnson Hall and Adirondack Park, are further designated National Historic Landmarks of the United States.

This National Park Service list is complete through NPS recent listings posted December 5, 2025.

Contents: Counties in New York
Albany (Albany) – Allegany – Bronx – Broome – Cattaraugus – Cayuga – Chautauqua – Chemung – Chenango – Clinton – Columbia – Cortland – Delaware – Dutchess (Poughkeepsie, Rhinebeck) – Erie (Buffalo) – Essex – Franklin – Fulton – Genesee – Greene – Hamilton – Herkimer – Jefferson – Kings – Lewis – Livingston – Madison – Monroe (Rochester) – Montgomery – Nassau – New York (Below 14th Street, 14th to 59th Streets, 59th to 110th Streets, Above 110th Street, Islands) – Niagara (Niagara Falls) – Oneida – Onondaga (Syracuse) – Ontario – Orange – Orleans – Oswego – Otsego – Putnam – Queens – Rensselaer – Richmond – Rockland – St. Lawrence – Saratoga – Schenectady – Schoharie – Schuyler – Seneca – Steuben – Suffolk – Sullivan – Tioga – Tompkins – Ulster – Warren – Washington – Wayne – Westchester (Northern, Southern, New Rochelle, Peekskill, Yonkers) – Wyoming – Yates

== Listings county-wide ==
	Name on the Register	Image	Date listed	Location	City or town	Description
1	Adirondack Forest Preserve	Adirondack Forest Preserve	October 15, 1966 (#66000891)	NE New York State; 43°58′43″N 74°18′42″W	Adirondack State Forest Preserve	
2	Benjamin Chamberlain House	Benjamin Chamberlain House	August 12, 1999 (#99000989)	100 Market St. 43°00′15″N 74°22′22″W	Johnstown	
3	Bleecker District No. 3 School		August 4, 2025 (#100012061)	112 Lily Lake Road; 43°07′12″N 74°22′02″W	Bleecker	
4	Dolge Company Factory Complex	Dolge Company Factory Complex	September 17, 1974 (#74001238)	S. Main St. 43°06′07″N 74°46′09″W	Dolgeville	
5	Downtown Gloversville Historic District	Downtown Gloversville Historic District	September 12, 1985 (#85002367)	Roughly bounded by Spring, Prospect, E. Fulton, N. and S. Main and Elm Sts. 43°03′03″N 74°20′43″W	Gloversville	
6	First United Methodist Church	First United Methodist Church	February 20, 1998 (#98000128)	7 Elm St. at Bleecker Sq. 43°03′07″N 74°20′48″W	Gloversville	
7	Fulton County Courthouse	Fulton County Courthouse	July 24, 1972 (#72000841)	N. William St. 43°00′24″N 74°22′32″W	Johnstown	
8	Fulton County Jail	Fulton County Jail	October 19, 1981 (#81000404)	Perry and Montgomery Sts. 43°00′11″N 74°22′16″W	Johnstown	
9	Garoga Site	Garoga Site	July 22, 1980 (#80002613)	Address Restricted	Ephratah	
10	Gloversville Armory	Gloversville Armory	March 2, 1995 (#95000081)	87 Washington St. 43°03′00″N 74°20′26″W	Gloversville	
11	Gloversville Free Library	Gloversville Free Library	May 24, 1976 (#76001219)	58 E. Fulton St. 43°03′01″N 74°20′36″W	Gloversville	
12	Hotel Broadalbin	Hotel Broadalbin	May 4, 2011 (#11000252)	59 W. Main St. 43°03′24″N 74°11′57″W	Broadalbin	
13	Johnson Hall	Johnson Hall	October 15, 1966 (#66000520)	Hall St. 43°00′54″N 74°22′58″W	Johnstown	
14	Johnstown Colonial Cemetery	Johnstown Colonial Cemetery	March 9, 1998 (#98000129)	Jct. of W. Green and N. Market Sts. 43°00′30″N 74°22′23″W	Johnstown	
15	Kane Mountain Fire Observation Station	Kane Mountain Fire Observation Station	September 23, 2001 (#01001033)	Kane Mountain; 43°10′29″N 74°31′04″W	Caroga	
16	Kingsboro Historic District	Kingsboro Historic District	February 24, 1975 (#75001190)	Area surrounding Kingsboro Ave. Park to N side of cemetery and S to include both sides of Gregory St. 43°04′01″N 74°20′12″W	Gloversville	
17	Klock Site	Klock Site	July 22, 1980 (#80002614)	Address Restricted	Ephratah	
18	Knox Mansion	Knox Mansion	February 28, 2008 (#08000101)	104 W. 2nd Ave. 43°00′02″N 74°22′28″W	Johnstown	
19	Gustav Levor House	Gustav Levor House	June 10, 2005 (#05000572)	23 Prospect Ave. 43°03′11″N 74°20′30″W	Gloversville	
20	Log Cabin Church	Log Cabin Church	March 18, 1999 (#99000350)	413 Progress Rd. 43°02′35″N 74°17′33″W	Mayfield	
21	Northville Historic District	Northville Historic District	May 7, 2014 (#14000191)	Roughly Main, Division & Bridge Sts. 43°13′13″N 74°10′18″W	Northville	Historic core of lower Adirondack town
22	Smith Pagerie Site	Smith Pagerie Site	April 22, 1980 (#80002615)	Address Restricted	Ephratah	
23	Oliver Rice House	Oliver Rice House	February 10, 1995 (#95000046)	Old NY 30, E side 43°06′00″N 74°16′40″W	Mayfield	
24	Oppenheim and St. Johnsville Union Society Church		July 19, 2010 (#10000485)	110 County Highway 108; 43°02′27″N 74°43′16″W	Crum Creek vicinity	
25	Sacandaga Railroad Station	Sacandaga Railroad Station	March 7, 2003 (#03000094)	136 McKinley Ave. 43°13′01″N 74°11′09″W	Sacandaga Park	
26	Godfrey Shew House	Godfrey Shew House	July 12, 2006 (#06000574)	1632 S. Shore Rd. 43°08′43″N 74°07′26″W	Fish House	
27	St. John's Episcopal Church	St. John's Episcopal Church	September 24, 2004 (#04001054)	1 North Market St. 43°00′24″N 74°22′24″W	Johnstown	
28	US Post Office-Johnstown	US Post Office-Johnstown	May 11, 1989 (#88002337)	14 N. William St. 43°00′26″N 74°22′27″W	Johnstown	

== See also ==
- National Register of Historic Places listings in New York
