= Willard J. Heacock =

Willard J. Heacock (April 5, 1821 – March 21, 1906) was an American businessman and politician from Gloversville, New York.

== Life ==
Heacock was born on April 5, 1821, in Johnstown, New York, the son of Philander Heacock and Margaret Smith.

Heacock's parents died in 1837, when he was only sixteen. When he was twenty, he started working in the dry goods store of Jacob and Elisha Burton in Kingsboro. In 1845, he began manufacturing gloves in Kingsboro. In 1861, he formed a partnership with his brother Joseph S. under the firm name W. J. and J. S. Heacock. The partnership lasted five years. During that time, he headed efforts to build a railroad from Fonda through Johnstown to Gloversville. In 1872, he organized and became president of a company that expanded the railroad to Northville.

Active in the Republican Party, Heacock was a vice-president of the 1860 Republican State Convention in Syracuse, a representative of the manufacturers in his district before Congress on the Revenue Act of 1861, and chairman of the county's War Committee. In 1862, he was elected to the New York State Assembly by 49 votes as a Republican, representing Fulton County and Hamilton County. By then, he was living in Gloversville. He served in the Assembly in 1863 and 1873.

Heacock was the main founder, a charter member, and senior ruling elder of the First Presbyterian Church of Gloversville, furnishing more than half the funds for the erection of the church. He was also a director of the National Fulton County Bank, a trustee of the Gloversville Free Library, and a member of the Republican State Committee. In 1845, he married Minerva M. Avery. Their surviving children were Marion L. (wife of Fred E. Hotchkiss of Redlands, California), Lillian (wife of Henry H. Pettit of Redlands), and Willard A. (a physician in New York City). Minerva died in 1890, and in 1891 he married Clara Barton Perry of Geneseo, Illinois.

Heacock died at home on March 21, 1906. His funeral was held at his home and conducted by Rev. Harvey Clements and Rev. H. W. Tolson. The directors of the Gloversville Free Library all attended the funeral. He was buried in Prospect Hill Cemetery.

New York State Assembly
Preceded by James H. Burr	New York State Assembly; Fulton and Hamilton Counties; 1863	Succeeded by William A. Smith
Preceded by Samuel W. Buel	New York State Assembly; Fulton and Hamilton Counties; 1873	Succeeded by John Sunderlin
