= James H. Burr =

American politician (1816–1906)

James Howard Burr (May 9, 1816 – December 10, 1906) was an American glove manufacturer and politician from New York.

== Life ==
Burr was born on May 9, 1816, in Gloversville, New York, the son of James Burr and Amarillis Mills.

In 1840, Burr entered the glove business in a shop. In 1844, he joined the glove manufacturing firm F. and D.M. Burr & Company with Francis Burr and David M. Burr. The firm was a continuation of his father's glove and mitten manufacturing business that began in 1809. In 1848, the firm was dissolved and Burr established his own business. In 1853, he developed a factory that, by 1892, employed an average of 60 workers, including 30 cutters. He was also president of the National Bank of Gloversville and the vice president and last surviving original stockholder of the Fulton County National Bank.

In 1860, Burr was elected to the New York State Assembly as a Republican, representing Fulton and Hamilton counties. He served in the Assembly in 1861 and 1862. He was initially a Whig, but he later became a Republican. While in the Assembly, he played a critical role in electing Ira Harris to the United States Senate in 1861. By 1862, he became the United States Collector in the 18th Congressional District.

Burr was a member of the First Baptist Church of Gloversville from 1841 until his death. He was also trustee of the church, superintendent of the Sunday school, and treasurer of the Saratoga Baptists Association and the New York State Baptist Mission Society. In 1841, he married Azubah Warner of Troy. Azubah died in 1890, and two years later he married widow Kittie C. Young. He had a stepdaughter, Mrs. Fred C. Fowler, and his children with Azubah were Harvey W., Caroline, and Julia A.

Burr died at home on December 10, 1906. He was buried in Prospect Hill Cemetery in Gloversville.

New York State Assembly
Preceded by James Kennedy	New York State Assembly; Fulton and Hamilton Counties; 1861–1862	Succeeded by Willard J. Heacock
