= Glove Theatre =

Historic theater in Gloversville, New York

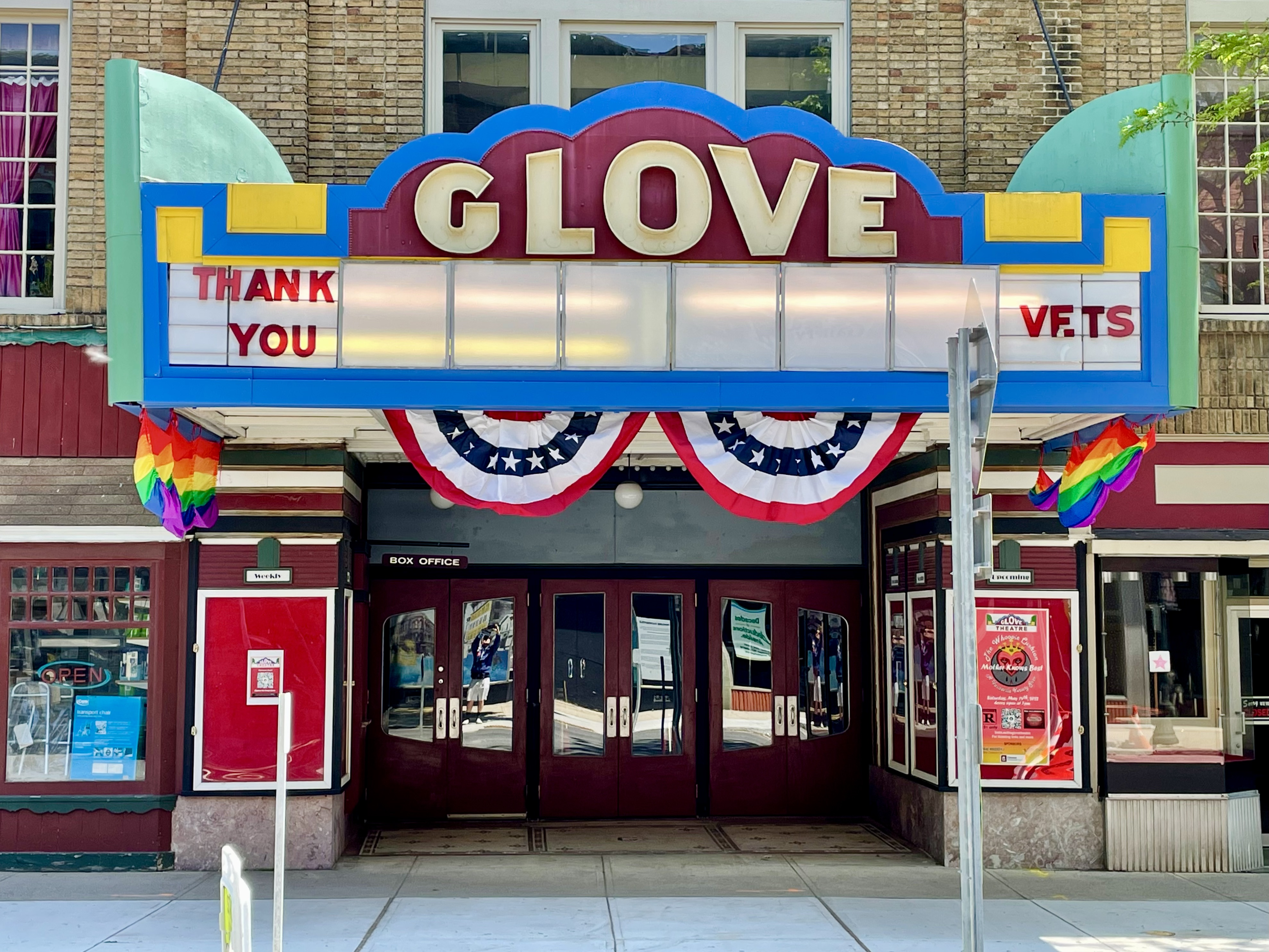
- Interactive map of Glove Theatre
- Address: 42 North Main Street; Gloversville, NY; United States
- Coordinates: 43°03′06″N 74°20′41″W
- Owner: Gloversville Theatre Corporation
- Capacity: 800 originally, 250 currently
- Designation: NRHP

Construction
- Opened: 1914
- Closed: 1971
- Reopened: 1997
- Architect: Linn Kinne

Website
- theglovetheatre.com

The Glove Theatre is a historic theater located at 42 North Main Street in Gloversville, New York. It is located in the Downtown Gloversville Historic District and on the National Register of Historic Places.

== History (1913 - 1920) ==
Situated between City Hall and the Kasson Block Building, the area where the Glove Theatre now sits, known to locals as the 'historic Hosmer property,' was purchased in the summer of 1913 by Dr. Henry Cady, a well-known veterinary surgeon, and George Dartch, a local businessman, who at one time, operated the Hotel Lincoln at 52 North Main Street. At the time of the purchase, the property housed a barber shop and Hollenbeck’s lunch wagon. Tenants were given a month’s notice to vacate the property.

For many years there were speculations of another entertainment venue opening. At that time there were two opera houses, the Family Theatre inside the Kasson Block Building, and the Darling Theatre. Built in the late 19th century, it was owned by Hiram Darling and located at 15 Elm Street facing Middle Street, later changed to Freemont Street. Mr Darling would also donate the land of which Darling Field would be established on.

The building was designed by Utica based architect Linn Kinney in the Classical Revival style. In the fall of 1913, Cady and Dartch went before the City's Common Council on various matters related to the construction of the theatre. Two requests were granted. The first was to amend the City's Ordinance, which did not allow for a marquee over the sidewalk, which "would add much to the appearance of the structure and be a decided ornament to the street." The second was to allow for a fire escape to be placed over the City Hall driveway.

The "new" 800-seat Glove Theatre opened on October 9, 1914. As part of the opening night events, The Call of the North (1914 film), the second film directed by Cecil B. DeMille was screened.

From its inception, the Glove Theatre attracted a variety of well-rounded live entertainment for all including local, amateur, touring shows, professional troupes, and world-renowned entertainers in a variety of genres such as orchestral concerts, plays, and opera.

In addition to live entertainment, it served as a home for community events such as Gloversville High School graduations, dance competitions, fashion exhibits, speaking engagements, and at times, a venue for the Fulton County Board of Supervisors.

In 1917, Carrie Chapman Catt during the ultimately successful push for New York voters to approve a women’s suffrage amendment to the state constitution at that year’s election, spoke to a "Glove Theatre Packed to Overflowing” in an appeal to Gloversville for Suffrage. The October 17, 1917, Morning Herald article states: “With every seat in the Glove theatre occupied, the gallery completely jammed and people in the rear of the house standing patiently four rows deep for almost two hours, Mrs. Carrie Chapman Catt, national and international executive head of the Woman Suffrage movement, last night presented the arguments in substantiation of the cause of which she is executive leader in language which depended for its eloquence entirely upon its appeal to logic and reason, rather than dramatic oratory or stirring phrases.”

Society reporting in local papers frequently cited the Glove Theatre. In 1927, the society section noted that "bathing beauties" of New York and "Miss Ohio" landed in Fonda enroute to the Glove Theatre to exhibit being escorted by Herman, the Chrysler garage man in a string of fancy coupes.

== Schine Enterprise (1920 - 1971) ==
Following the success of their purchase of the Hippodrome Theatre at the corner of East Fulton Street and Freemont Street, in 1920, brothers Junius Myer Schine and Louis W. Schine purchased the Glove Theatre building as the flagship headquarters of Schine Enterprise, turning the venue into a vaudeville house. The purchase also included a carriage house, the last remaining structure of the A. J. Kasson Estate which was situated along East Fulton Street; and the Kasson Block Building, home to the Kasson Opera House, later known as the Family Theatre. They converted the neighboring building into part of their entertainment headquarters with the upper two floors used for offices. The office space also consisted of a private screening room to screen movies before distribution nationwide. The building is now known as Schine Memorial Hall.

Schine Enterprise continued the venue's tradition of community outreach. In 1924, they hosted an evening for Daughters of the American Revolution (DAR) where the Caughnawaga Chapter was one of many DAR Chapters to a private screening of America (1924 film) directed by D. W. Griffith, and adapted from the 1905 novel The Reckoning, written by Broadalbin resident Robert W. Chambers.

Innovations in theater equipment were first tested at the Glove Theatre before widespread distribution. In 1928, for example, the Glove Theatre was among the first in the nation to be equipped with sound.

During the Great Depression, Friday and Saturday nights were marketed as 'rural night', which, in addition to a movie screening, activities would include log-chopping, nail driving, the biggest family, milking, and square dancing.

Renovations in late summer 1939 modernized the building in the Art Deco architectural style. On October 6, 1939, the Schine's reopened the "New Glove theatre" which included the addition of the current Glove marquee, designed by John Eberson Special guests included movie representatives from RKO Pictures, Republic Film Corps., Columbia Pictures, 20th Century-Fox, and Paramount Pictures. Other special guests included Dr. A. L. Johnson, the former city health director and first patron to purchase a ticket when Schine Enterprise took ownership in the 1920s; George Dartch, former owner of the Glove Theatre; and Mrs. J. B. Morris, former owner of the Family Theatre and Kasson Building.

Several weeks later, Gloversville was the first of 5 municipalities to be selected to host the location premiere of Drums Along the Mohawk starring Henry Fonda and Claudette Colbert by 20th Century-Fox on Thursday, November 2, 1939; citing the geographic location of Fort Johnson, New York and Sacandaga which several years earlier was transformed into a reservoir. Mayor Chauncey Thayer and executives of 20th Century-Fox were in attendance for the world premiere. In total, over 40 communities applied but the honor was given to Gloversville and other Mohawk Valley communities including the City of Albany at Palace Theatre (Albany, New York) with NYS Governor Herbert H. Lehman and Mayor John Boyd Thacher II in attendance; the City of Utica at the Olympic Theatre; the City of Schenectady at the Plaza Theatre; and the City of Amsterdam at the Rialto Theatre, also operated by Schine Enterprise. Prior to the screening, a street parade took place which included several Native American Tribes, The Liberty Boys, and descendants of Douw Fonda.

During World War II, The Glove was a kickoff point for bond drives, scrap metal drives, and speaking tours from veterans. Following the war, the Schines solely hired veterans and were trained at the Glove before going to work at other venues, many who would later become managers within the chain. All aspects of theatre management were taught including customer service, and basic maintenance.

At its height, Schine Enterprises operated over 150 theatres in 4 states

By the early 1960s, Schine Enterprises still operated around 50 theaters, including the Glove. In 1965, the company sold off most of its property except for the Glove Theatre. While still owned by Schine, operations were transferred to Panther Theaters under a leasing agreement. The September 2, 1966 edition of the Leader-Herald stated that J. Myer Schine, “said he would not sell the Glove Theater because of its sentimental value.” The agreement lasted for several years.

November 28, 1971, the Glove Theatre closed, as it was reportedly operating at a loss. The last two movies to be screened were Let's Scare Jessica to Death and Unman, Wittering and Zigo (film)

Over the next 25 years, the venue mainly stood vacant with some infrequent screenings. In 1976, the Glove, again screened Drums Along the Mohawk as part of the bi-centennial celebration. In the early 1990s, owner Rick Ruby, during the holiday season, would invite Santa Claus into the lobby.

== New Era For The Glove (1995 - Present) ==
By 1995, The building was being strongly considered for demolition to make way for a parking lot. The same year community members raised necessary funds to resurrect the theatre and The Gloversville Theatre Corporation was established. On October 25, 1997, the next era of The Glove Theatre began with a grand re-opening event: “The Phantom of The Glove.” Entertainment included speeches from then Glove Theatre Board President Vincent DeSantis and other locals. Musical acts by local Miss Fulton County, musicians and performers, high school students from Northville, Johnstown, Mayfield, Gloversville, Broadalbin-Perth, Johnstown High School Madrigal Choir, and Gloversville High School Select Chorus. Local performer and baker Leta Aldous made a cake recreating the exterior of the Glove Theatre.

In the late 1990s, Roberta Esposito was hired as Artistic Executive Director to help the community members work on plans to renovate the theatre and bring entertainment to downtown Gloversville. In the spring of 1998, the venue produced Follies, the first stage production in several decades, drawing in dozens of community members from Fulton County and the surrounding area. That summer, Cinderella (Rodgers and Hammerstein musical) was produced with almost 100 school-age children. During the Holiday Season, Frosty and Friends, a variety show of high school students in costumes such as Babar and Celeste, Frosty the Snowman, and other known cartoon characters, were brought to life for elementary school kids. In the early aughts, the Glove was home to Summer stock theater doing several musicals during July and August. While the original Board of Directors vision was that of a venue for all genres of entertainment as well as an outlet for community events, the focus shifted to that of a producing theatre house.

In the late aughts and throughout the second decade of the twenty-first century, budgetary constraints left leadership solely up to the board. While development was slow-moving, the Glove stayed afloat due to Richard and Joann Samrov.

In the aftermath of COVID-19, the Glove Theatre brought on new board members with various backgrounds and skill sets looking to continue the vision to develop the venue into a catalyst of economic development in Gloversville.

On Wednesday, May 28, 2022, the 'Blackmon Film Series' later rebranded as the 'Love the Glove Film Series' sponsored by the Blackmon, Perrott, and Peck Families, has screened free weekly movies; the first time since the 1960s weekly events have taken place in the theatre. In addition to movies, the Glove has presented, produced kids musicals; vaudeville shows; theatrical productions (both producing and presenting); dance parties; educational seminars; family-friendly events; a summer theatre academy; and concerts, attracting local, regional, and national groups, pivoting back to the 1995 goals and vision of the venue laid out by the original Board of Directors.

In November of 2022, NYS Governor Kathy Hochul (the first governor to visit downtown Gloversville in many administrations) announced on the stage, that the venue was part of Round 5 of the New York State's Downtown Revitalization Initiative (DRI) for the City of Gloversville. The Glove was awarded $1,994,000 for pending renovation costs. In May 2023, The Glove was awarded another $2 million to fund additional renovations through the RestoreNY program.

On June 3, 2023, an unveiling of a New York State Historic Markers through the William G. Pomeroy Foundation, was placed in the front of the theatre with speeches from NYS Assemblymember Robert Smullen, NYS Senator Mark Walczyk, Fulton County Historian and Executive Director of the Fulton County Historical Society Samantha Hall-Saladino, Glove Theatre Vice President Alex Miller, and Fulton County Vice Chairman of the Board of Supervisors John Blackmon.

== Live Entertainment History ==
- Adobe theatre company
- Alex Torres & His Latin Orchestra
- Ann Rutherford
- Buddy Jewell
- Caroga Arts Collective
- Charles Coburn
- Charles Laughton
- Emma De Weale with the F. James Carroll Players / Carroll Stock Company
- Gloversville Philharmonic Orchestra
- Ethel Barrymore in The Second Mrs Tanqueray
- Irene Dunne
- John Philip Sousa
- Leo the Lion (MGM)
- Louis Prima
- Major Bowes Amateur Hour
- NoLaNauts
- Sally Rand
- Tommy McClellan
- Tony Randall
- Quintocracy
- Victor Jory
- Wynotte Sisters
- Ziegfeld Follies
- Zippy the Chimp
