= Casey Johnston =

American writer and influencer (born 1987)

- Born: February 6, 1987 (age 38); Gloversville, New York, U.S.
- Other names: "Swole Woman"
- Education: Columbia University (BS)
- Occupations: Writer; editor; internet personality
- Years active: 2009–present

Instagram information
- Page: Casey Johnston
- Years active: 2016–present
- Followers: 36,277 (July 20, 2023)
- Website: www.caseyjohnston.website

Casey Johnston (born February 6, 1987) (Note: Johnston's birthday of February 6, and age of 36 in July 2023, place her year of birth in 1987.) is an American writer, editor, and strength-training advocate. She has written the fitness advice column "Ask a Swole Woman" since 2016 and a newsletter about weightlifting, She's a Beast, since 2021.

== Early life and education ==
Johnston grew up in the city of Gloversville in upstate New York. She played field hockey and lacrosse at the Emma Willard School in Troy, New York, and went to Columbia University in New York City, where she graduated with a bachelor's degree in applied physics from the university's engineering school in 2010.

== Career ==
Johnston worked as a writer and editor for Ars Technica after beginning her career there as an intern in June 2009. She was an editor for the product review website Wirecutter from 2014 to 2018. In December 2014, a tweet by Johnston went viral when, after a male follower told her to "read the full article" about a story she had linked, she replied: "I wrote the article". While working for the website The Outline in 2018, she wrote an article criticizing the MacBook Pro's new butterfly keyboard design.

Johnston became interested in weightlifting after seeing Reddit posts by a beginner female weightlifter. She had put on some weight while in college, and begun running and dieting with a focus on her body image, behaviors which increasingly strained her over seven years. She began strength training in 2014, using Mark Rippetoe's book Starting Strength, and as she got stronger and felt better she soon "couldn't stop talking about" the virtues of weightlifting.

In July 2016, Johnston started writing a fitness advice column, "Ask a Swole Woman", for the website The Hairpin, at the request of Hairpin editor Silvia Killingsworth, one of many people to whom she had enthusiastically talked about weightlifting. GQ described her tone as "that of an enthusiastic amateur with an eye for bullshit". After The Hairpin shut down in 2018, the column moved to the magazine Self and then Vice, which dismissed her during the COVID-19 pandemic in 2021. She then launched a weightlifting newsletter, She's a Beast—which "Ask a Swole Woman" became part of. As of 2023, She's a Beast has about 25,000 free or paid subscribers, and Johnston has over 34,000 Instagram followers.

An ebook published by Johnston in December 2021, Liftoff: Couch to Barbell, describes a twelve-week regimen for weightlifting beginners. It is intended to make weightlifting more accessible for women or men who may not consider themselves typical weightlifters, and those who, in her words, feel that "their body [is] never hot enough, always in too much pain". Over 11,000 copies have sold digitally.
