= Mortimer Wade =

American politician and businessman

Mortimer Wade (December 23, 1821 – November 1, 1902) was an American manufacturer and politician from Johnstown, New York.

== Life ==
Wade was born on December 23, 1821, in St. Johnsville, New York (back when it was part of Oppenheim, the son of Gideon Wade and Sophia Brown.

Wade attended the local public schools. When he was twenty, he moved to Ephratah and spent two years working as a teacher. He then became involved in the manufacture of boots and shoes. He moved to Johnstown in 1861 and began manufacturing gloves with James M. Dudley. He worked with Dudley for many years, but later conducted the business on his own and from 1874 to 1876 he was associated with Byron G. Shults. He then worked alone for a while, and in 1888 he formed a partnership with his son Frank. The partnership lasted until Wade retired in 1897.

Initially a Whig, Wade later joined the Republican Party. He was elected Supervisor of Ephratah (a Democratic town) in 1855, 1858, and 1859. By 1871, he was president of the village of Johnstown. In 1870, he was elected to the New York State Assembly as a Republican, representing Fulton County and Hamilton County. He served in the Assembly in 1871. He served as county clerk from 1860 to 1875, assistant journal clerk in the State Legislature from 1879 to 1881, and a trustee of the board of education for 15 years. He was also postmaster of Johnstown from 1884 to 1888.

Wade was a trustee of the local Presbyterian church and a trustee of the Fonda, J. & G. Railroad Company. In 1844, he married Sarah A. Van Voast of Ephratah. Their surviving children were Arabella (wife of James W. Miller), Franklin B. (glove manufacturer), and Mortimer Jr. (clerk of the Surrogates Court).

Wade died at home on November 1, 1902, ten weeks after a stroke that left him bedridden. The funeral was conducted at his house by Rev. James A. Williamson. He was buried in Johnstown Cemetery.

New York State Assembly
Preceded by John F. Empie	New York State Assembly; Fulton and Hamilton Counties; 1871	Succeeded by Samuel W. Buel
