= Samuel W. Buel =

Samuel Wakeman Buel (March 16, 1830 – July 29, 1895) was an American businessman and politician.

== Life ==
Buel was born on March 16, 1830, in Broadalbin, New York.

Buel attended the common schools in town. The son of a farmer, he worked in that field until he was eighteen. He then began working in the lumbering business. By 1868, he was living in Benson.

A War Democrat during the American Civil War, Buel was elected School Commissioner of Hamilton County in 1866. In 1867, Buel was elected to the New York State Assembly as a Democrat, representing Fulton County and Hamilton County. He served in the Assembly in 1868 and 1872.

Buel died from typhoid fever at his home in South Ballston (where he retired to in around 1875) on July 29, 1895.

New York State Assembly
Preceded by Joseph Covell	New York State Assembly; Fulton and Hamilton Counties; 1868	Succeeded by William F. Barker
Preceded by Mortimer Wade	New York State Assembly; Fulton and Hamilton Counties; 1872	Succeeded by Willard J. Heacock
