= WFNY =

Radio station in Gloversville, New York

- Gloversville, New York; United States
- Broadcast area: Mohawk Valley
- Frequency: 1440 kHz

Programming
- Format: Variety

Ownership
- Owner: Michael A. Sleezer
- Sister stations: WFNY-CD

History
- First air date: September 2002; 23 years ago
- Call sign meaning: Fulton (county) New York

Technical information
- Licensing authority: FCC
- Facility ID: 129191
- Class: B
- Power: 5,000 watts (day); 500 watts (night)
- Transmitter coordinates: 43°01′57.3″N 74°21′0.5″W
- Translators: (93.1 MHz) W226CO (Gloversville); (94.1 MHz) W231CF (Gloversville)

Links
- Public license information: Public file; LMS

WFNY (1440 AM) is a commercial radio station licensed to Gloversville, New York. Programming primarily consists of what is known as a variety format, focusing on pop music from the 1950s to the 1980s, along with local weather forecasts, as the station has no local news department or sales department. WFNY serves the Mohawk Valley. The station is owned by local businessman Michael A. Sleezer.

The station also simulcasts on W226CO 93.1 FM and W231CF 94.1 FM.
