= William F. Barker =

American merchant and politician (1823–1895)

William Fayette Barker (August 6, 1823 – May 14, 1895) was an American merchant and politician.

== Biography ==
Barker was born on August 6, 1823, in Hope, New York, the son of John Barker and Alice Cornell. He moved to Edinburgh in 1831, followed by Northville in 1844. He lived in the latter village for the rest of his life and lived in the same house for 45 years. Shortly after arriving in Northville, he began a large and successful general merchandise business. In about 1877, he had to make an assignment on the business due to bad speculations, after which he had to work in the store he previously ran.

Originally a Whig, Barker joined the Republican Party upon its formation. In 1868, he was elected to the New York State Assembly as a Republican, representing Fulton County and Hamilton County. He served in the Assembly in 1869. He was also Supervisor of Northampton in 1859 to 1860, Postmaster of Northville from 1861 to 1867, and superintendent of the local Methodist Episcopal Church Sunday School.

In 1844, Barker married Nancy Buswell, with whom he had two children. He died on May 14, 1895, aged 71, from gastric fever.

New York State Assembly
Preceded by Samuel W. Buel	New York State Assembly; Fulton and Hamilton Counties; 1869	Succeeded by John F. Empie
