= John F. Empie =

American politician (1821–1918)

Member of the New York State Assembly from the Fulton and Hamilton District
- In office January 1, 1870 – December 31, 1870
- Preceded by: William F. Barker
- Succeeded by: Mortimer Wade

Member of the Fulton County Board of Supervisors
- In office 1867–1971

Personal details
- Born: John Frederick Empie; March 10, 1821 Ephratah, New York, U.S.
- Died: April 20, 1918 (aged 97) Ephratah, New York, U.S.
- Resting place: Ephratah Rural Cemetery; Ephratah, New York, U.S.
- Party: Democratic
- Other offices: Chair of the Fulton County Democratic Party

John Frederick Empie (March 10, 1821 – April 20, 1918) was an American politician who served in the 93rd New York State Legislature. He was also a member of the Fulton County Board of Supervisors from 1867 to 1871.

== Biography ==
Empie was born on March 10, 1821, in Ephratah, New York to Frederick and Nancy Klock Empie. His grandparents were German immigrants who were early settlers in upstate New York. After receiving a "common school education", he took up farming. He eventually married Elenor M. Van Vost (1884).

== Political career ==
In 1870, Empie was elected to the New York State Assembly to represent Fulton and Hamilton counties. He was elected as a Democrat and served one term. After his service in the legislature he continued to be active in Democratic party politics. According to History of Fulton County (1892), he also served as a supervisor in Fulton County for at least five years.
