= Lillie M. Peck =

American social worker

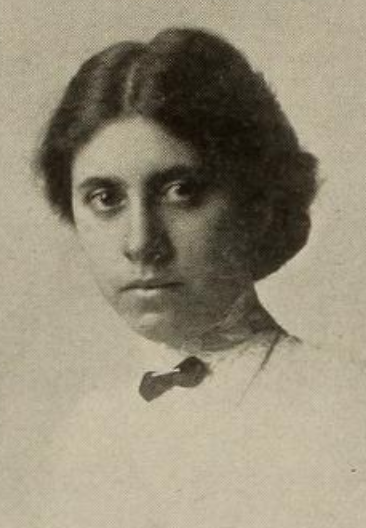
- Lillie M. Peck, from the 1913 yearbook of Simmons College
- Born: December 1888; Gloversville, New York, U.S.
- Died: February 21, 1957 (aged 68); New York, New York, U.S.
- Occupations: Social worker, settlement movement leader

Lillie Marion Peck (December 28, 1888 – February 21, 1957) was an American social worker and leader in the settlement movement. She was an organizer and honorary president of the International Federation of Settlements, founded in 1922, and executive secretary of the National Federation of Settlements from 1934 to 1947.

== Early life and education ==
Peck was born in Gloversville, New York, the daughter of Adolph L. Peck and Clara Sperling Peck. Her mother was born in Germany. Her father, who was born in Vienna, was a professor and a librarian. She graduated from Simmons College in 1913.

== Career ==
After college, Peck worked a secretary of the Boston Social Union, where she became assistant head resident in 1928. In the mid-1920s she spent two years traveling in Europe, visiting settlement houses in England, France, Austria, Germany, and Scandinavia. She was an organizer and honorary president of the International Federation of Settlements, founded in 1922, and executive secretary of the National Federation of Settlements from 1934 to 1947. In 1944 she signed the National Child Labor Committee's statement against wartime child labor exploitation. In 1952 she was appointed by the International Federation of Settlements as a delegate to UNESCO.

== Publications ==
- "The Soziale Arbeitsgemeinschaft" (1928)
- "A Few Impressions by a Settlement Worker" (1937)
- "Settlements" (1943)

== Personal life ==
Peck lived and worked at the Henry Street Settlement in New York City from 1933 until her death in 1957. She died in 1957, at the age of 68, in New York City.
