= Gustav Levor House =

Historic house in New York, United States

- U.S. National Register of Historic Places
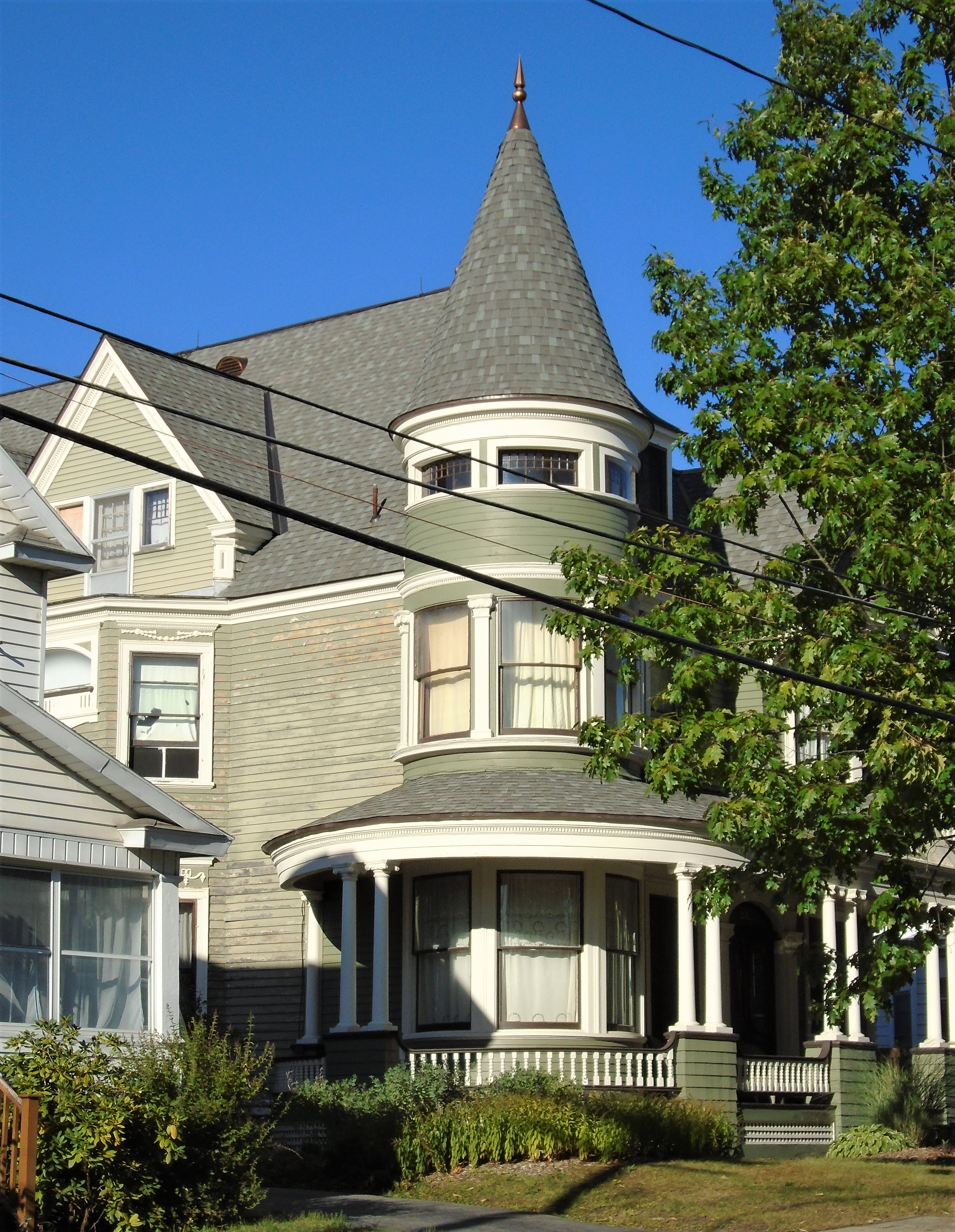
- (2020)

- Location within New York Location within the United States
- Location: 23 Prospect Ave., Gloversville, New York
- Coordinates: 43°3′11″N 74°20′30″W
- Built: 1892
- Architectural style: Queen Anne
- NRHP reference No.: 05000572
- Added to NRHP: June 10, 2005

The Gustav Levor House is a historic home located in Gloversville, Fulton County, New York. It was built in 1892 and is an irregularly massed, 2 1/2-story, frame, Queen Anne–style residence. It features complex massing, a polygonal wall bay, intersecting roofs and gables, and an engaged round corner tower with a conical roof.

It was listed on the National Register of Historic Places in 2005.
