= First United Methodist Church (Gloversville, New York) =

Historic church in New York, United States

- U.S. National Register of Historic Places
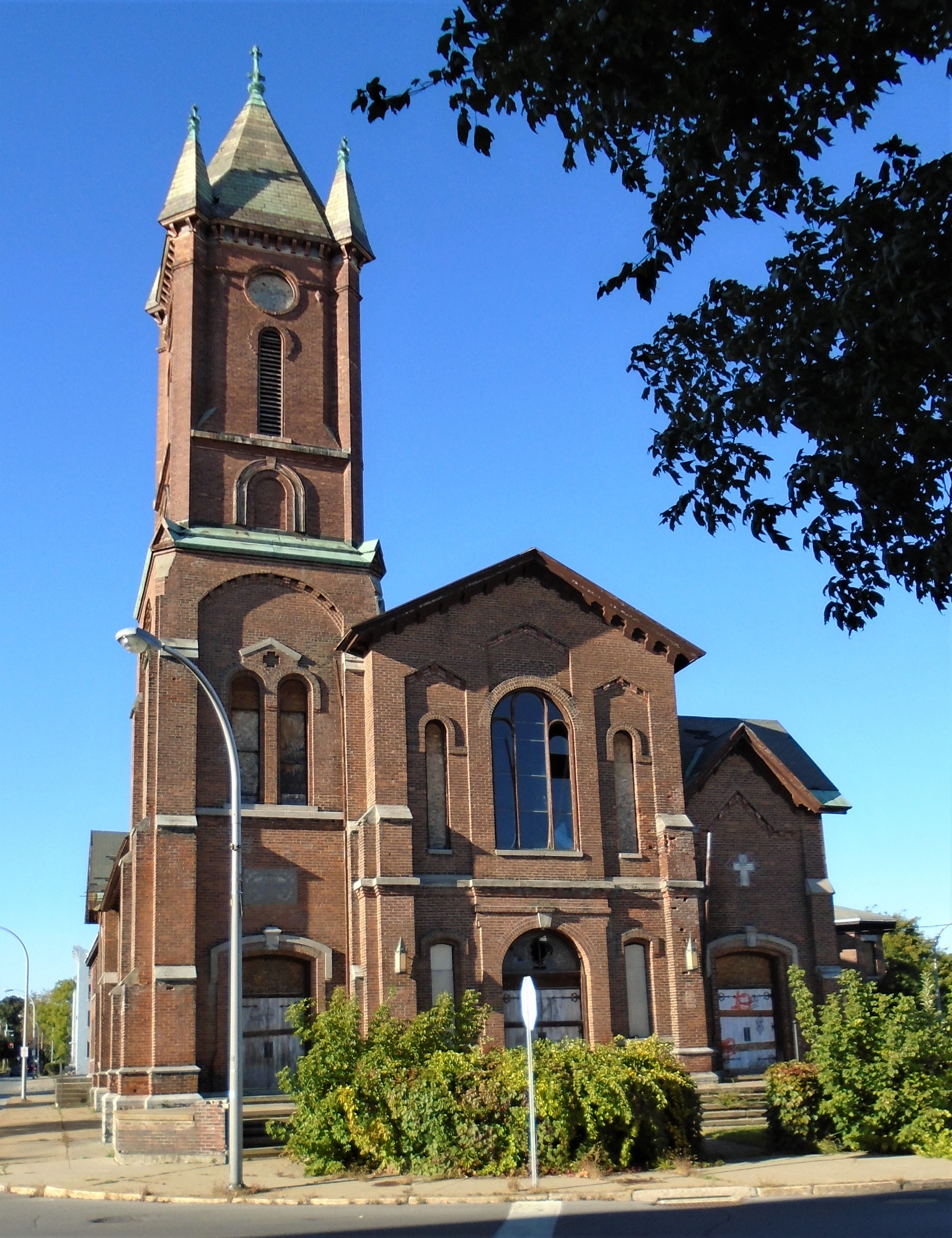
- (2020)

- Location within New York Location within the United States
- Location: 7 Elm St. at Bleecker Sq., Gloversville, New York
- Coordinates: 43°3′7″N 74°20′48″W
- Built: 1868
- Architect: Horatio Nelson White
- Architectural style: Romanesque Revival
- NRHP reference No.: 98000128
- Added to NRHP: February 20, 1998

First United Methodist Church is a historic United Methodist church at 7 Elm Street at Bleecker Square in Gloversville, Fulton County, New York. It was designed by Horatio Nelson White in the Romanesque Revival style and was built from 1869 to 1870. The main block / sanctuary is a two-story red brick structure set on a cut stone foundation. It is flanked by a staged entrance / bell tower and two-story office wing. An addition was completed in 1909 and is a two-story, polygonal brick structure containing a chapel, Sunday School room and parish hall.

It was listed on the National Register of Historic Places in 1998.

In 2000 the First United Methodist Church sold this building to another church organization, but the building has been vacant since then.
