= Kingsboro Historic District =

Historic district in New York, United States

- U.S. National Register of Historic Places
- U.S. Historic district
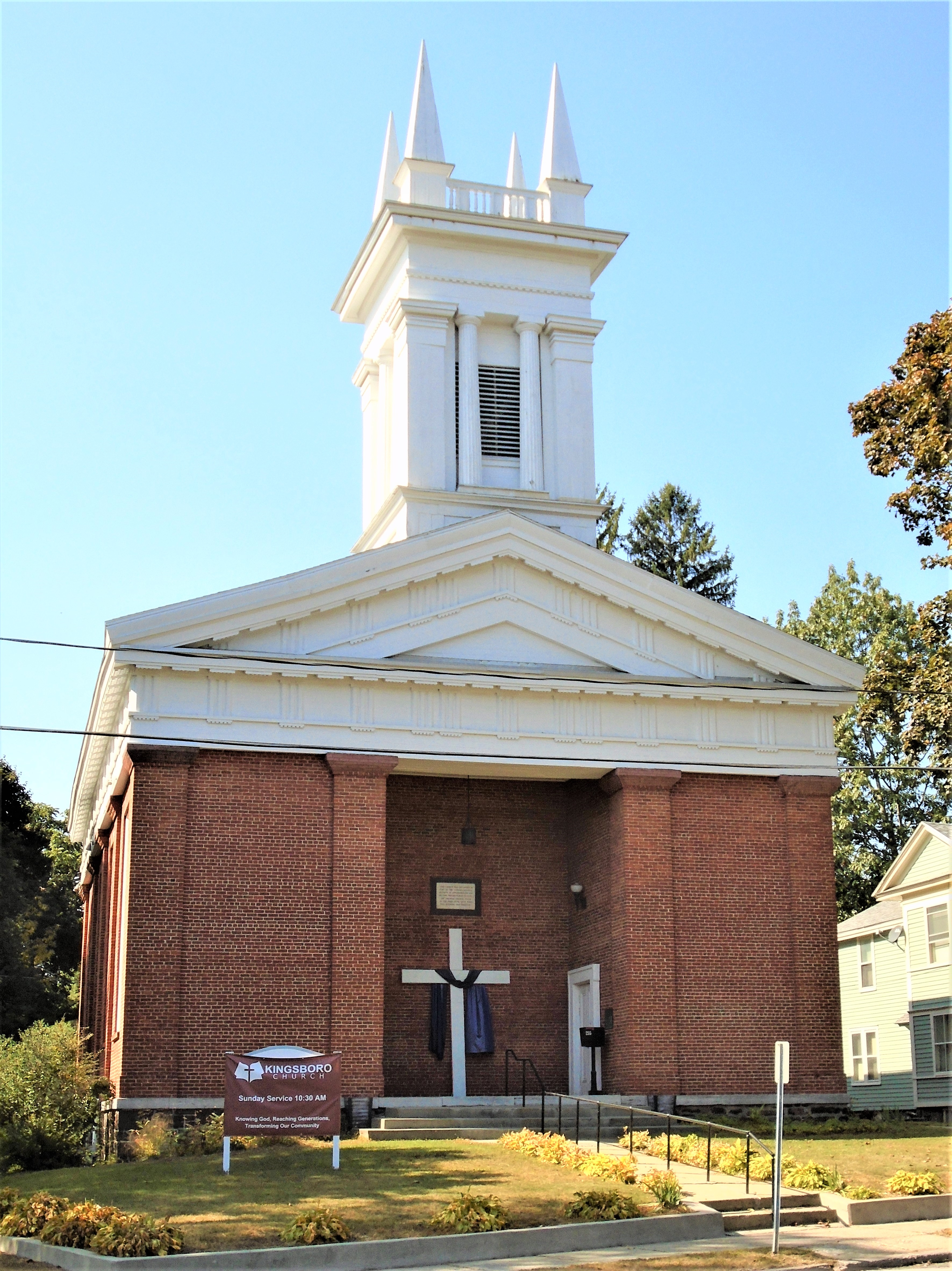
- The Kingsboro church, built in 1838, is the centerpiece of the historic district

- Location within New York Location within the United States
- Location: Area surrounding Kingsboro Ave. Park (Veterans Park) to N side of Kingsboro Cemetery and S to include both sides of Gregory St., Gloversville, New York
- Coordinates: 43°4′1″N 74°20′12″W
- Area: 14 acres (5.7 ha)
- Architect: various
- Architectural style: Primarily Greek Revival
- NRHP reference No.: 75001190
- Added to NRHP: February 24, 1975

The Kingsboro Historic District is a small national historic district located in Gloversville, Fulton County, New York. The district contains 18 contributing buildings and one contributing site.

The district encompasses all the properties that face Veterans Park – formerly Kingsboro Avenue Park – plus five additional properties.

These properties are primarily one and two family residences dating to the 1820 to 1840 period and reflect the Greek Revival style.

Also included is the Kingsboro church (1838), Kingsboro Cemetery, a monument in the park, and a former elementary school which is now the Fulton County Museum.

The district was listed on the National Register of Historic Places in 1975.

== Gallery ==
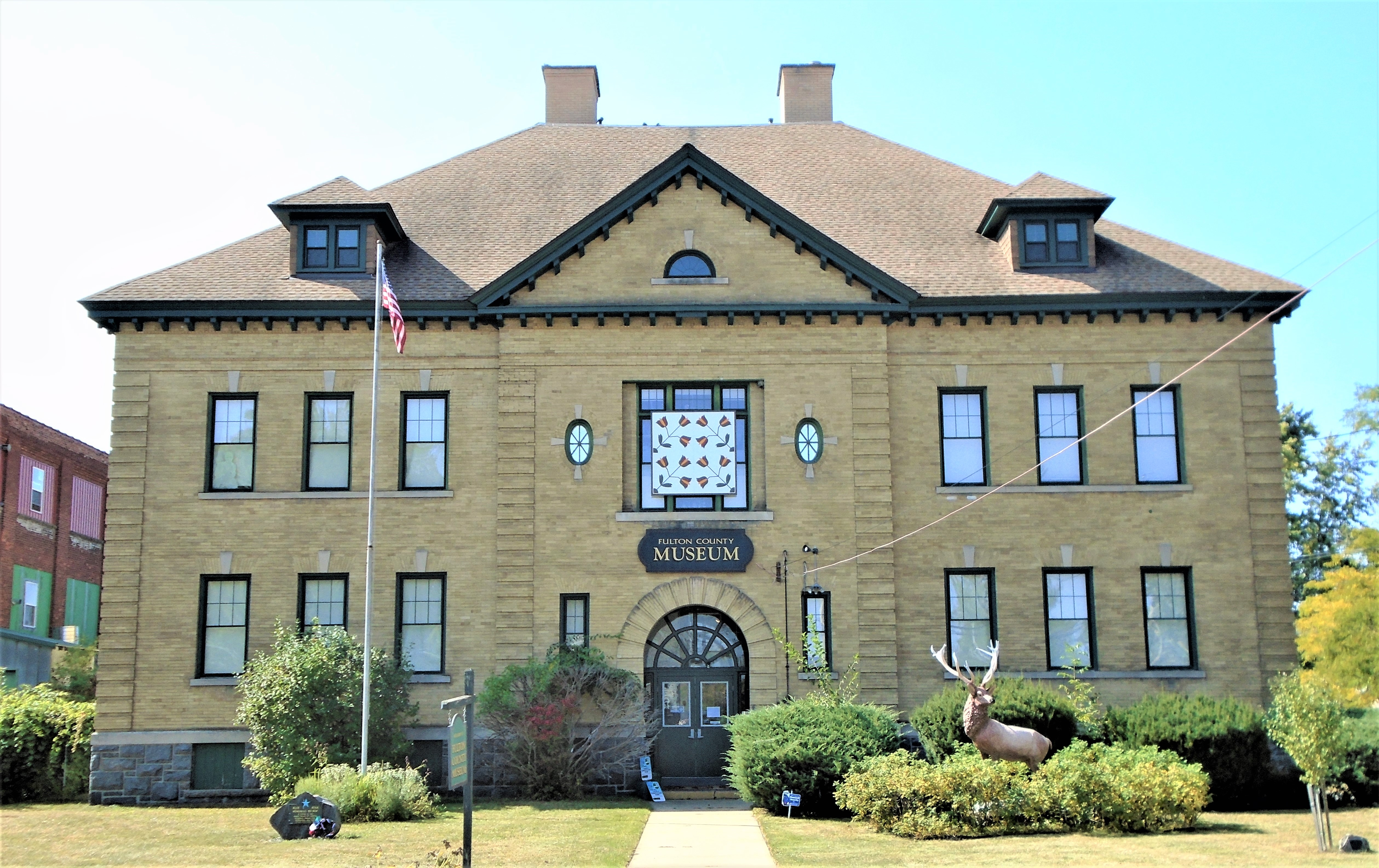
The Fulton County Museum was built in 1900 as a public elementary school

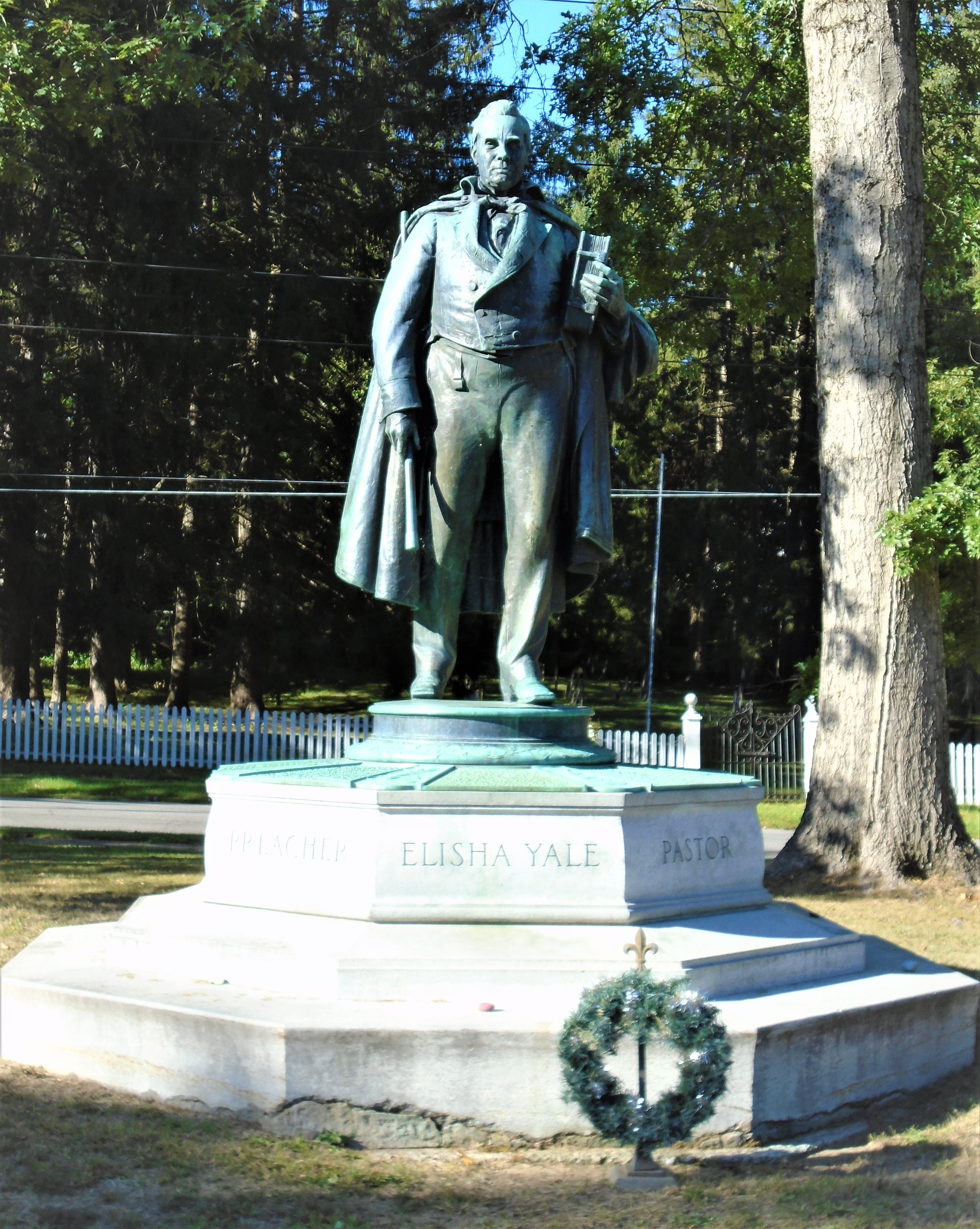
The monument to Rev. Elisha Yale in the park

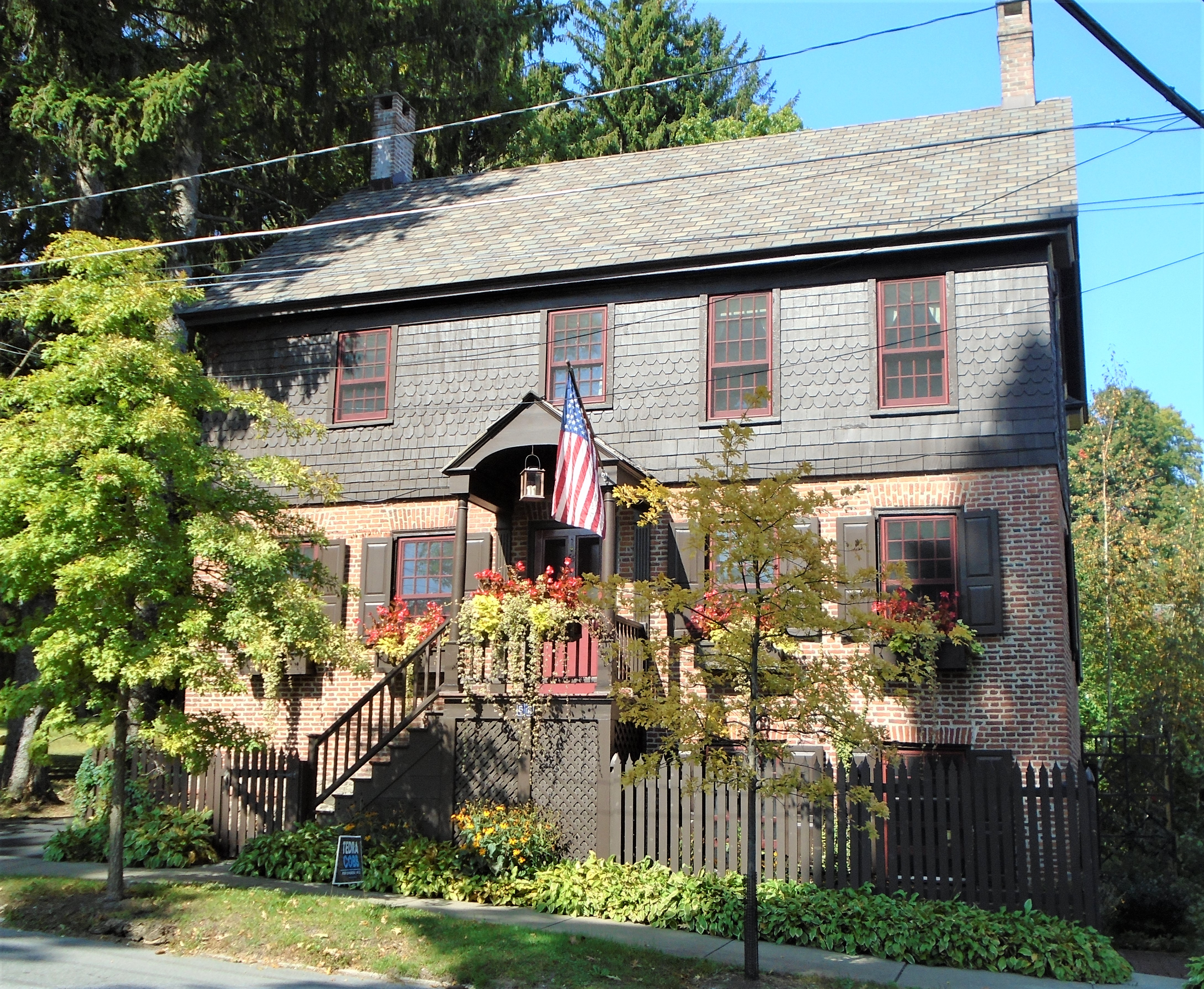
A house dating from c.1800 at 55 East State Street

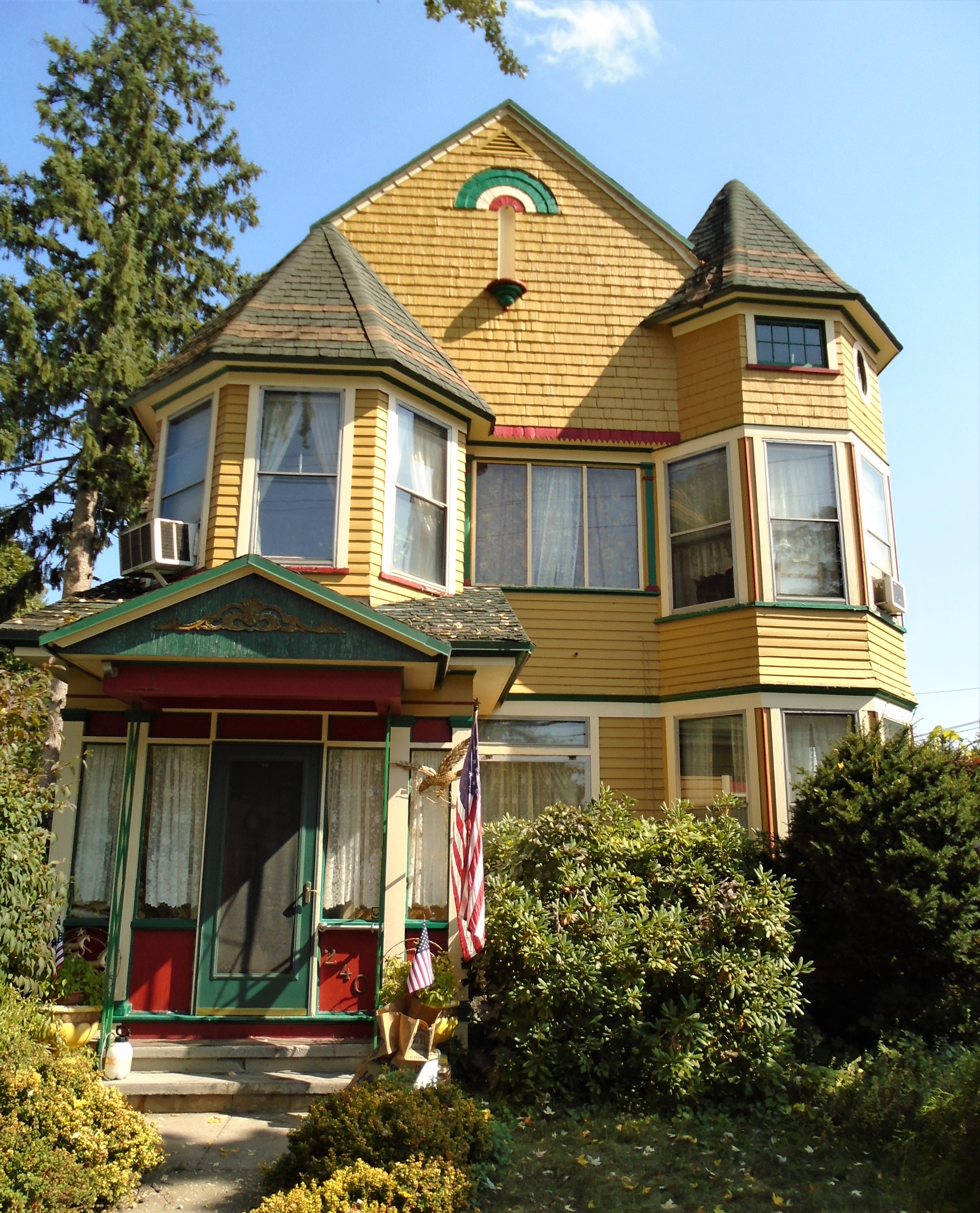
A house at 240 Kingsboro Avenue
