= Gloversville Armory =

- U.S. National Register of Historic Places
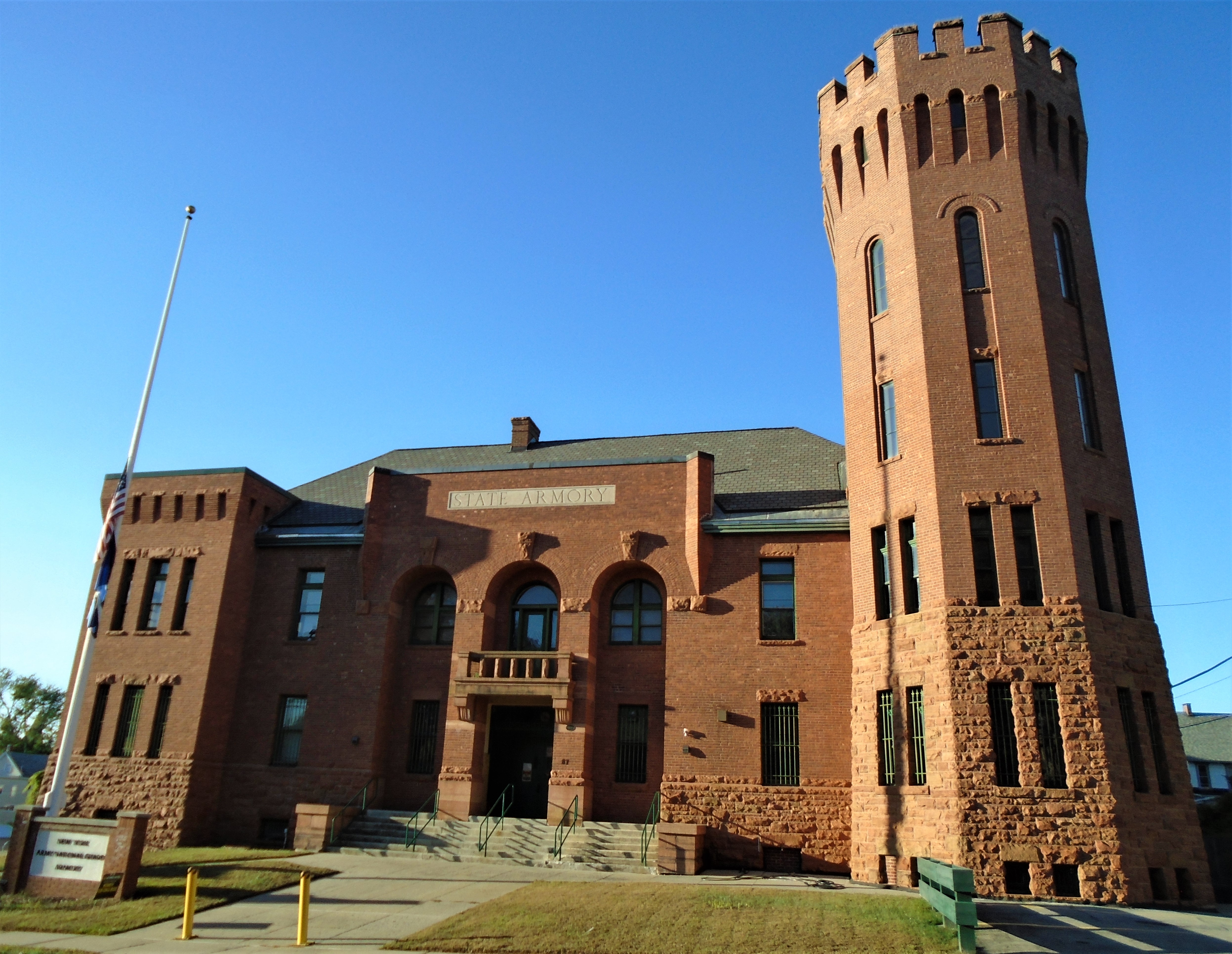
- (2020)

- Location within New York Location within the United States
- Location: 87 Washington St., Gloversville, New York
- Coordinates: 43°3′0″N 74°20′26″W
- Built: 1903
- Architect: George L. Heins
- Architectural style: Late Victorian, castellated
- MPS: Army National Guard Armories in New York State MPS
- NRHP reference No.: 95000081
- Added to NRHP: March 2, 1995

Gloversville Armory is a historic National Guard armory building located at 87 Washington Street in Gloversville, Fulton County, New York. It is a brick and red sandstone castle-like structure built from 1903 to 1904, designed to be reminiscent of medieval military structures in Europe. It was designed by State Architect George L. Heins in the Late Victorian style.

The armory is used by the New York Army National Guard. It consists of a two-story administration building with an attached drill shed. The building features three engaged irregular towers; a five-story octagonal tower, two-story square tower with hipped roof, and two-story tower with crenelated parapet.

The Gloversville Armory was listed on the National Register of Historic Places in 1995.
