= Gloversville Free Library =

- Gloversville Public Library
- U.S. National Register of Historic Places
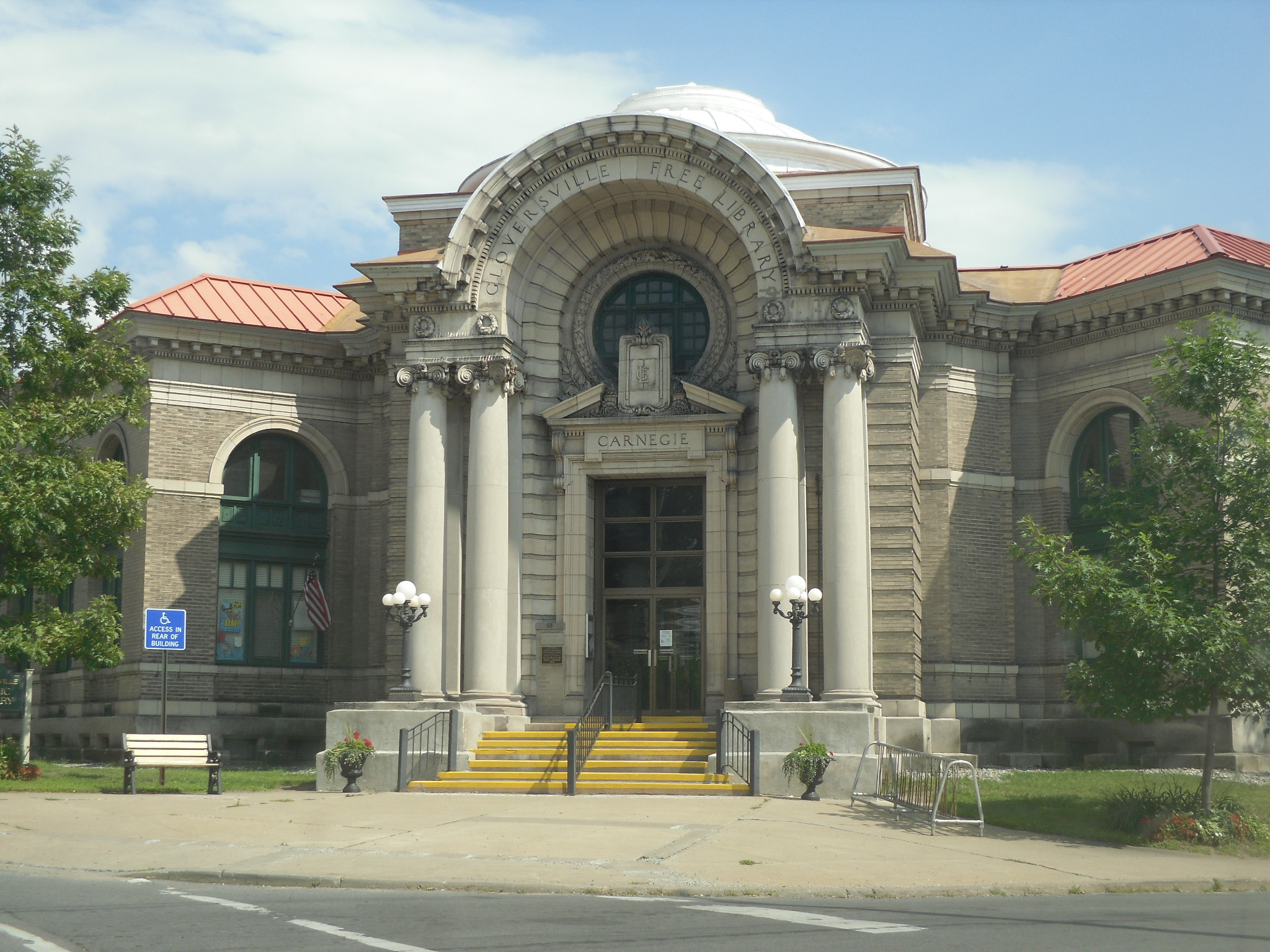
- Gloversville Free Library, August 2010

- Location within New York Location within the United States
- Location: 58 E. Fulton St., Gloversville, New York
- Coordinates: 43°3′1″N 74°20′36″W
- Built: 1904
- Architect: Albert Randolph Ross
- Architectural style: Beaux-Arts
- NRHP reference No.: 76001219
- Added to NRHP: May 24, 1976

The Gloversville Public Library, located at 58 East Fulton Street in Gloversville, Fulton County, New York, was constructed in 1904 with funds provided by the philanthropist Andrew Carnegie. It is one of 3,000 such Carnegie libraries constructed between 1885 and 1919, and one of 107 in New York State. Carnegie contributed $50,000 toward the cost to build. His name is inscribed on the building's entrance.

The building is a two-story Beaux-Arts style building, designed by New York City architect Albert Randolph Ross. It consists of four parts: a domed entrance hall containing stairwells, a large central stack space, and two flanking wings that meet the central axis at a 45-degree angle.

It was listed on the National Register of Historic Places in 1976 as the "Gloversville Free Library".

Predecessors of the current Gloversville Public Library, which was incorporated as a school district public library in 2005, include the Gloversville Free Library – an association library from 1888 to 2005 – and the Levi Parsons Library of Gloversville and Kingsborough, a subscription library from 1880 to 1888.

The Gloversville Public Library reopened on November 5, 2018, after undergoing the renovation of the historic library building
