= Gloversville, New York =

- City
- City of Gloversville
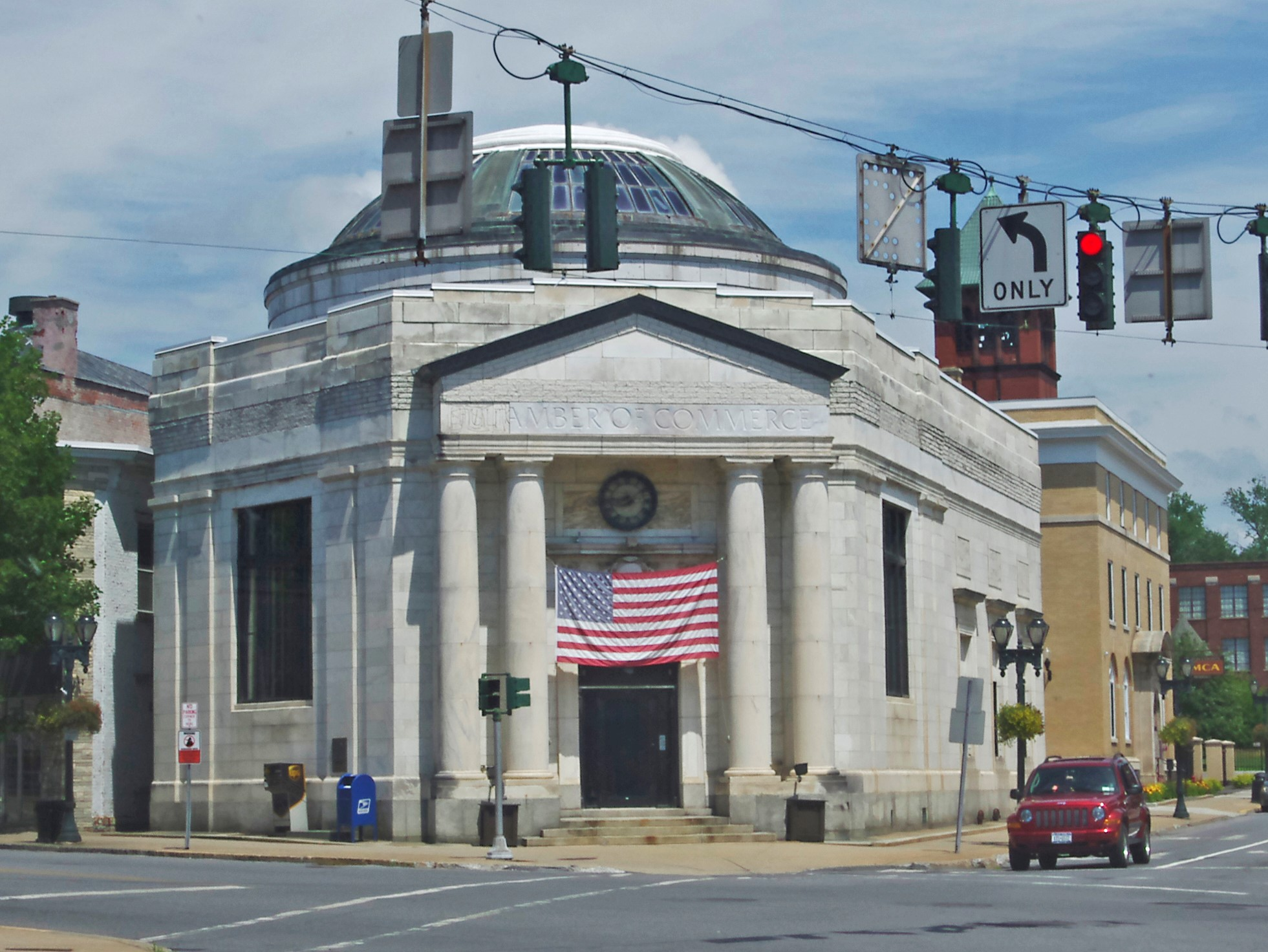
- Chamber of Commerce Building

- Seal

- Location in the U.S. state of New York Gloversville (the United States)
- Coordinates: 43°3′N 74°21′W
- Country: United States
- State: New York
- County: Fulton
- Incorporated (village): 1853
- Incorporated (city): March 19, 1890

Government
  - Type: Mayor-Council
  - Mayor: Gary Antonucci (R)
  - Common Council: Members' List: • At-Large: Wayne Peters (R); • W1: Marcia Weiss (D); • W2: Jessica McNamara (R); • W3: Betsy Batchelor (D); • W4: Ellen Anadio (R); • W5: Jay Zarrelli (R); • W6: Michael Stover (R)

Area
  - Total: 5.05 sq mi (13.09 km^{2})
  - Land: 5.05 sq mi (13.07 km^{2})
  - Water: 0.0077 sq mi (0.02 km^{2})
- Elevation: 820 ft (250 m)

Population (2020)
  - Total: 15,131
  - Estimate (2022): 14,932
  - Density: 2,998.6/sq mi (1,157.76/km^{2})
- Time zone: UTC-5 (Eastern (EST))
  - Summer (DST): UTC-4 (EDT)
- ZIP Codes: 12078 (Gloversville); 12095 (Johnstown)
- Area code: 518
- FIPS code: 36-29443
- GNIS feature ID: 0951265
- Website: cityofgloversvilleny.gov

Gloversville is a city in the Mohawk Valley region of Upstate New York, United States. The most populous city in Fulton County, it was once the hub of the United States' glovemaking industry, with over 200 manufacturers there and the adjacent city of Johnstown. In 2026, Gloversville has a population of 14,719.

== History ==
Settlers of European descent came to the Gloversville area as early as 1752.

The region, historically known as "Kingsborough", was acquired by Sir William Johnson, 1st Baronet, who established tremendous influence with the Native Americans of the area, which translated into control of the Mohawk Valley region. It was due to Johnson where the Six Nations Iroquois Confederacy remained allied with England during the French and Indian War. In reward, Johnson was granted the Kingsborough Tract, a large parcel of land which was settled by Scottish Highlanders. Some of the Highlanders were so loyal to Johnson that after the Revolutionary War, they followed his son to Canada.

In 1752, Arent Stevens purchased land in the area. Puritans from New England settled there at the end of the 18th century, utilizing the houses and cleared land that had been left behind when the Highlanders emigrated. By 1803, according to Rev. Elisha Yale, the population of Kingsborough consisted of "233 families and about 1,400 souls. Of the families, 191 are of English descent, twenty-three Scot, fourteen Dutch, and five Irish."

In 1852, Gloversville had a population of 1,318 living on 525 acres in 250 small wood-frame houses centered on the "Four Corners" formed by the intersection of Main and Fulton Streets. The proximity of hemlock forests to supply bark for tanning made the community a center of leather production early in its history: there were already 40 small glove and mitten factories there by 1852. The city would become the center of the American glovemaking industry for many years. From 1890 to 1950, 90% of all gloves sold in the United States were made in Gloversville.

Upon the establishment of a United States post office in 1828, "Gloversville" became the official name of the community. Prior to that Gloversville had been known as "Stump City" because of the large number of trees that had been cut down. In 1853, Gloversville incorporated as a village, and then in 1890 as a city. The city grew rapidly, and the population swelled from 4,000 in 1877 to 13,864 in 1890.

Glove-making operations had gradually changed from being home-based to being factory-based, and large tanneries and glove shops employed nearly 80% of the residents of Gloversville area. Home workers sewed the gloves from leather which had been cut in factories. Related businesses, such as box makers, sewing machine repairmen, and thread dealers opened to serve the industry.

Until 1936, Gloversville had a very active electric interurban line, the Fonda, Johnstown and Gloversville Railroad. It ran from Gloversville through Johnstown, along the Mohawk River to Amsterdam, then to Scotia, then across the Mohawk River, and into downtown Schenectady to the New York Central station. In 1932, in a bold move during the Great Depression it acquired unique bullet cars in an attempt to revive the economy. Freight operation continued through this era. Gloversville also became the main headquarters for the Schine movie industry in the mid-20th century.

From the 1950s onwards, the decline of the glove industry left the city more and more deindustrialized and financially depressed, with many downtown storefronts abandoned and store windows covered with plywood. Many houses were abandoned when some people moved out of town to find jobs elsewhere. The city's population peaked at 23,634 in 1950 and had since fallen to 15,665 people in 2010. In 2018, redevelopment plans of downtown Gloversville were revealed. In 2019, former Mayor Vincent DeSantis (D) proposed economic revitalization plans. On June 5, 2020, the Regan Development Corporation, based in Ardsley, New York, proposed plans to develop a new commercial space and apartment complex for the city. The city, along with the Fulton County Center for Regional Growth, also began expanding digital marketing to attract new residents and businesses from throughout New York State in efforts to diversify.

== Geography ==
According to the United States Census Bureau, the city has a total area of 5.1 square miles (13.3 km^{2}), of which 0.0077 square miles (0.02 km^{2}), or 0.17%, is water. New York State Route 29A (Fulton Street) is an east–west road through the city. New York State Route 30A is a north–south highway along the eastern edge of the city, leading south 4 miles (6 km) into Johnstown and northeast 5 miles (8 km) to Mayfield at the southwestern end of Great Sacandaga Lake. Another north–south highway, New York State Route 309 (Bleecker Street), has its southern terminus at NY-29A in the center of Gloversville.

Cayadutta Creek, a tributary of the Mohawk River, flows southward through the city.

The city sits in the foothills of the Adirondack Mountains and therefore is within a climatic transition zone. Gloversville experiences the warmer summer temperatures common throughout the Capital Region, Hudson Valley, and Mohawk Valley while experiencing generally more copious precipitation throughout the year than the Capital Region. This manifests in commonplace rolling thunderstorms throughout the summer months and snowfall amounts more akin to the lake-pocked higher elevations of the Adirondacks in the winter months.

Climate data for Gloversville, New York (12078)
Month	Jan	Feb	Mar	Apr	May	Jun	Jul	Aug	Sep	Oct	Nov	Dec	Year
Record high °F (°C)	68 (20)	62 (17)	83 (28)	90 (32)	90 (32)	96 (36)	98 (37)	96 (36)	99 (37)	87 (31)	77 (25)	66 (19)	99 (37)
Mean daily maximum °F (°C)	28 (−2)	32 (0)	41 (5)	55 (13)	68 (20)	76 (24)	80 (27)	79 (26)	71 (22)	58 (14)	46 (8)	34 (1)	56 (13)
Mean daily minimum °F (°C)	10 (−12)	11 (−12)	21 (−6)	33 (1)	44 (7)	54 (12)	58 (14)	57 (14)	48 (9)	36 (2)	28 (−2)	17 (−8)	35 (2)
Record low °F (°C)	−29 (−34)	−26 (−32)	−16 (−27)	0 (−18)	24 (−4)	34 (1)	40 (4)	34 (1)	22 (−6)	15 (−9)	−13 (−25)	−23 (−31)	−28 (−33)
Average precipitation inches (mm)	3.20 (81)	2.89 (73)	3.88 (99)	3.95 (100)	4.16 (106)	4.65 (118)	4.35 (110)	4.57 (116)	3.70 (94)	4.53 (115)	3.10 (79)	3.51 (89)	46.49 (1,181)
Average snowfall inches (cm)	24.2 (61)	16.5 (42)	13.4 (34)	1.7 (4.3)	0 (0)	0 (0)	0 (0)	0 (0)	0 (0)	0.1 (0.25)	3.7 (9.4)	17.4 (44)	77.0 (196)
Source: The Weather Channel

== Cityscape ==
=== Neighborhoods ===
The neighborhoods of Gloversville include Kingsboro, Saint Thomas Square, Bleecker Square, as well as Downtown.

=== Parks and recreation ===
Gloversville is home to over 10 parks and public spaces, with the largest being Herman Meyers Park. Meyers Park sits on 50 acres of wooded land close to the center of the city on land donated to the city from Max Meyers in honor of his father, Herman Meyers.

One of the most notable parks in the city is Trail Station Park, which is home to many events in the city year round. The Annual Easter Egg Hunt, Fallfest, and Railfest all take place in the park, as well as concerts in the summer. As of early 2020, expansions to the park have been planned. In her trip to Gloversville on November 28, 2022, Governor Kathy Hochul announced $495,000 will be set aside from the Downtown Revitalization Grant that Gloversville won in 2022.

Other parks and public spaces in the city include Union Street Park, Kingsboro Park, Darling Field, Melchoir Park, Estee Park, Ashley Park, Spring Street Park, Castiglione Memorial Park, Elk Street Park, South Main Street Piazza, and Parkhurst Field. Located between Temple and Union Streets, Union Street Park contains the city's ice rink in the winter and a full sized football field in the summer. On Kingsboro Ave and State Street is Kingsboro Park, which hosts a World War 2 Monument. Melchoir Park sits in between Park Drive and Kingsboro Ave on the eastern part of the city, containing a fountain and several sculptures. Ashley Park and Spring Street Park both have ADA accessible playground equipment. Elk Street Park (aka The Cage) and Darling field both have basketball courts, while Darling Field also has tennis courts. The Cage is located on Fulton and Elk in the center of the city, while Darling Field is in the northeastern part of the city on Kingsboro and Newman Streets.

== Demographics ==
Historical population
Census	Pop.	Note	%±
1870	4,518		—
1880	7,133		57.9%
1890	13,864		94.4%
1900	18,349		32.3%
1910	20,642		12.5%
1920	22,075		6.9%
1930	23,099		4.6%
1940	23,329		1.0%
1950	23,634		1.3%
1960	21,741		−8.0%
1970	19,677		−9.5%
1980	17,836		−9.4%
1990	16,656		−6.6%
2000	15,413		−7.5%
2010	15,665		1.6%
2020	15,131		−3.4%
U.S. Decennial Census

=== 2020 census ===
As of the 2020 census, Gloversville had a population of 15,131 and a population density of 2,998.6 inhabitants per square mile (1,157.8/km^{2}).

The median age was 39.4 years. 22.5% of residents were under the age of 18 and 17.1% of residents were 65 years of age or older. For every 100 females there were 96.6 males, and for every 100 females age 18 and over there were 93.1 males age 18 and over.

99.6% of residents lived in urban areas, while 0.4% lived in rural areas.

There were 6,462 households in Gloversville, of which 27.9% had children under the age of 18 living in them. Of all households, 29.4% were married-couple households, 24.1% were households with a male householder and no spouse or partner present, and 32.8% were households with a female householder and no spouse or partner present. About 36.2% of all households were made up of individuals and 14.2% had someone living alone who was 65 years of age or older.

There were 7,479 housing units, of which 13.6% were vacant. The homeowner vacancy rate was 2.9% and the rental vacancy rate was 8.2%.

Racial composition as of the 2020 census
Race	Number	Percent
White	12,965	85.7%
Black or African American	586	3.9%
American Indian and Alaska Native	55	0.4%
Asian	93	0.6%
Native Hawaiian and Other Pacific Islander	3	0.0%
Some other race	320	2.1%
Two or more races	1,109	7.3%
Hispanic or Latino (of any race)	889	5.9%

=== Demographic estimates ===
Census Bureau QuickFacts reports that 7.6% of residents were under the age of 5, and females made up 50.4% of the population while males made up 49.6%.

Gloversville's median age in 2018 was 40.5, higher than the national average of 38 in 2019.

=== Income and poverty ===
The estimated median household income from 2016 to 2020 was $38,620 and the per capita income was $21,973. The city's median value for housing units was $76,500 in 2020. An estimated 21.5% of the city lived at or below the poverty line.

=== Religion ===
According to Sperling's BestPlaces, less than 30% of Gloversville's residents have a religious affiliation as of 2020, far lower than the 70% who have a religious affiliation across Fulton County as a whole, making Gloversville one of the least religious places in the US. The largest religion that does exist in Gloversville and its surrounding area is Christianity, mainly served by the Roman Catholic, Episcopal, United Methodist and Presbyterian churches. Conservative evangelical churches in the area are the Southern Baptist Convention and Assemblies of God. The second largest religious group is Judaism, followed by adherents of eastern religions including Hinduism and Buddhism.

== Economy ==
The city of Gloversville was once a major center for the glovemaking industry in the United States, with over 200 glovemaking companies in the city at its peak. Since the 1950s, and accelerating in pace during the 1980s and 1990s, it has increasingly struggled with deindustrialization. Gloversville has also suffered from a declining population, poverty, drugs, and violent crime. During the late 2010s and early 2020, the city has proposed numerous economic redevelopment plans to stem its decline.

From 1931–2005, the town was also the home of a record-pressing plant that was founded by Brunswick Radio Corporation. In 1953, the plant was owned by American Decca Records, which became MCA Records in 1973 and merged with the PolyGram family of labels in 1999 to become Universal Music.

== Education ==
Gloversville falls entirely within the Gloversville Enlarged School District All of Gloversville ESD's schools are within city limits, with the exception of Meco Elementary, which is in the Town of Johnstown within 0.5 miles (0.80 km) of the city's western border. Nearby Fulton–Montgomery Community College is located in the Town of Johnstown.

== Transportation ==
The city owns and operates the Gloversville Transit System (GTS). GTS runs bus service in the City of Gloversville, as well as the cities of Johnstown and Amsterdam.

Trailways serves a downtown terminal on West Fulton Street.

Privately owned Glove City Taxi also operates in the cities of Gloversville and Johnstown.

== Sports ==
Parkhurst field, formerly the A.J.&G. field, located on Harrison Street is home to the Gloversville Little League. As of November 2022, Parkhurst field is undergoing a multi-million-dollar renovation.

Gloversville is also served by the Kingsboro Golf Course on the north side of the city. Kingsboro Golf Course is a 9-hole course with a restaurant and event center on site. In 2012, Pine Brook Golf Course, a 9-hole course near the south-west edge of the city closed. Its further development has been up in the air.

== Media ==
The city and area are primarily served by The Leader-Herald, a regional newspaper that is headquartered there. Gloversville lies within the Capital Region's media market. In addition to stations licensed to Albany, Gloversville is also served by radio stations WENT (1340 AM) and WFNY (1440 AM), and television station WFNY-CD (channel 16).

== Notable people ==
- Actress Elizabeth Anne Allen, who played Amy Madison on Buffy the Vampire Slayer, was born and raised in Gloversville.
- Actor Mischa Auer (1905–1967) is buried in Prospect Hill Cemetery in Gloversville.
- Ambassador Samuel D. Berger (1911–1980) was born and grew up in Gloversville. He was President John F. Kennedy's first Ambassadorial appointment (to Korea), and later served as Deputy Ambassador to Vietnam.
- Helen Broderick (1891–1959) film and stage actress, most known for Fifty Million Frenchmen and Top Hat. Her husband, Lester Crawford (1885–1962), was an American film actor. They are the parents of film star Broderick Crawford and resided for a period of time on Temple Street in the late 1930s and 1940s. All are buried at Fern Dale Cemetery in Johnstown.
- Actress Betty Buehler was raised in Gloversville.
- Harvard University physician, pathologist, and immunologist Albert Coons grew up in Gloversville. Coons devised the technology of immunofluorescence microscopy and received the prestigious Albert Lasker Award in 1959 for his achievements in medical science.
- Kenneth F. Cramer, United States Army, Major General and Chief of the National Guard Bureau, was born in Gloversville.
- Physicist William A. Edelstein, one of the key developers of MRI scanning, was born in Gloversville.
- In 1899, Samuel Goldwyn immigrated to the US from Poland through England to Canada. He eventually made his way to Gloversville. Having been trained in glovemaking in Hamburg by relatives, he worked as a glove maker and commissioned salesman for the Elite Glove Company.
- Eugene Goossen (1921–1997), an art historian, was born in Gloversville.
- Hall of Fame harness racing driver Billy Haughton was born in Gloversville.
- Willard J. Heacock (1821–1906), member of the New York State Assembly
- Casey Johnston (born 1987), fitness writer and influencer
- Lucius Littauer, five-term member of the United States House of Representatives, first-ever football coach for the Harvard Crimson football team, philanthropist, and convicted smuggler, was born in Gloversville. In 1891, he provided the founding donation for Nathan Littauer Hospital, which was named in honor of Lucius' father, and which continues to serve the Gloversville area.
- Actress Nicole Maines, who played Nia Nal aka Dreamer on Supergirl, was born in Gloversville.
- Fraser Metzger, clergyman, politician, and college administrator, born in Gloversville.
- Lillie M. Peck (1888–1957), social worker, president of the International Federation of Settlements, born in Gloversville
- Patrick Peterson, distance runner for the Atlanta Track Club based out of Atlanta, Georgia. Formerly of the Iowa State Cyclones, where he was an All-American, and of Sacred Heart University in Connecticut, where Peterson won multiple New England titles.
- Artist Frederic Remington was a one-time resident of Gloversville.
- Pulitzer Prize winning author Richard Russo (Empire Falls, The Risk Pool) was raised in Gloversville. The city and its residents were the inspiration for many of his characters and locations in his novels, especially his novel Mohawk.
- David Smukler (1914–1971), NFL football player
- Harriet Mabel Spalding (1862–1935) was a litterateur and poet.
- Opera singer Sharon Sweet was born and raised in Gloversville.

== Historic places of interest ==
- Gloversville contains two historic districts listed on the National Register of Historic Places (NRHP):
  - Downtown Gloversville Historic District - Primarily on North and South Main Street and East and West Fulton Street
  - Kingsboro Historic District - A small district consisting of the houses which face Veterans Park, the Kingsboro Assembly of God church, the Kingsboro Cemetery, the Fulton County Museum building, and several other properties.
- There are also a number of individual landmarks listed on the NRHP:
  - First United Methodist Church - currently unused
  - Gloversville Armory - used by the New York Army National Guard
  - Gloversville Free Library - now the Gloversville Public Library
  - Gustav Levor House

== Gallery ==
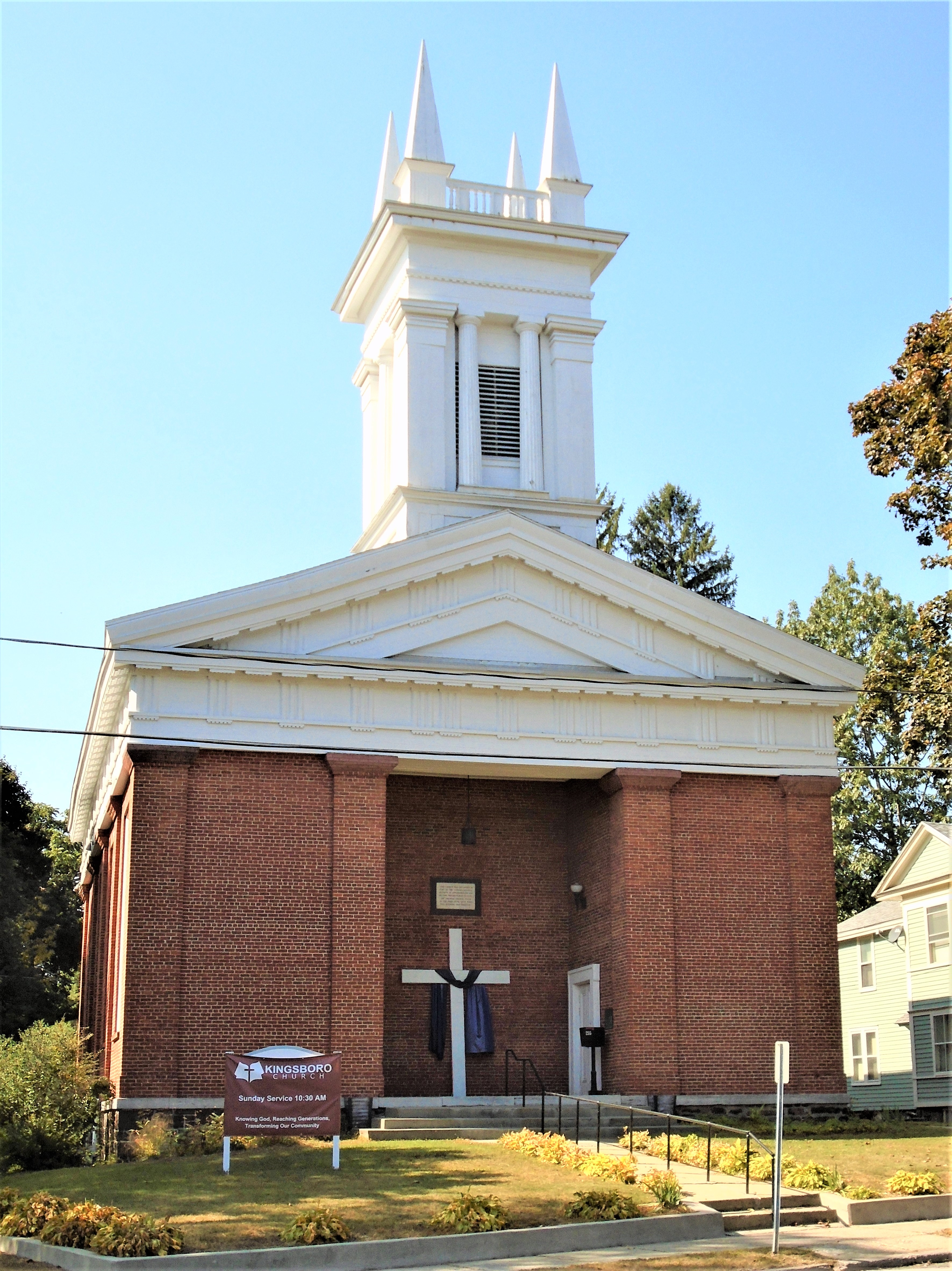
The Kingsboro Assembly of God Church, built in 1838 as a Presbyterian church, is the centerpiece of the Kingsboro Historic District

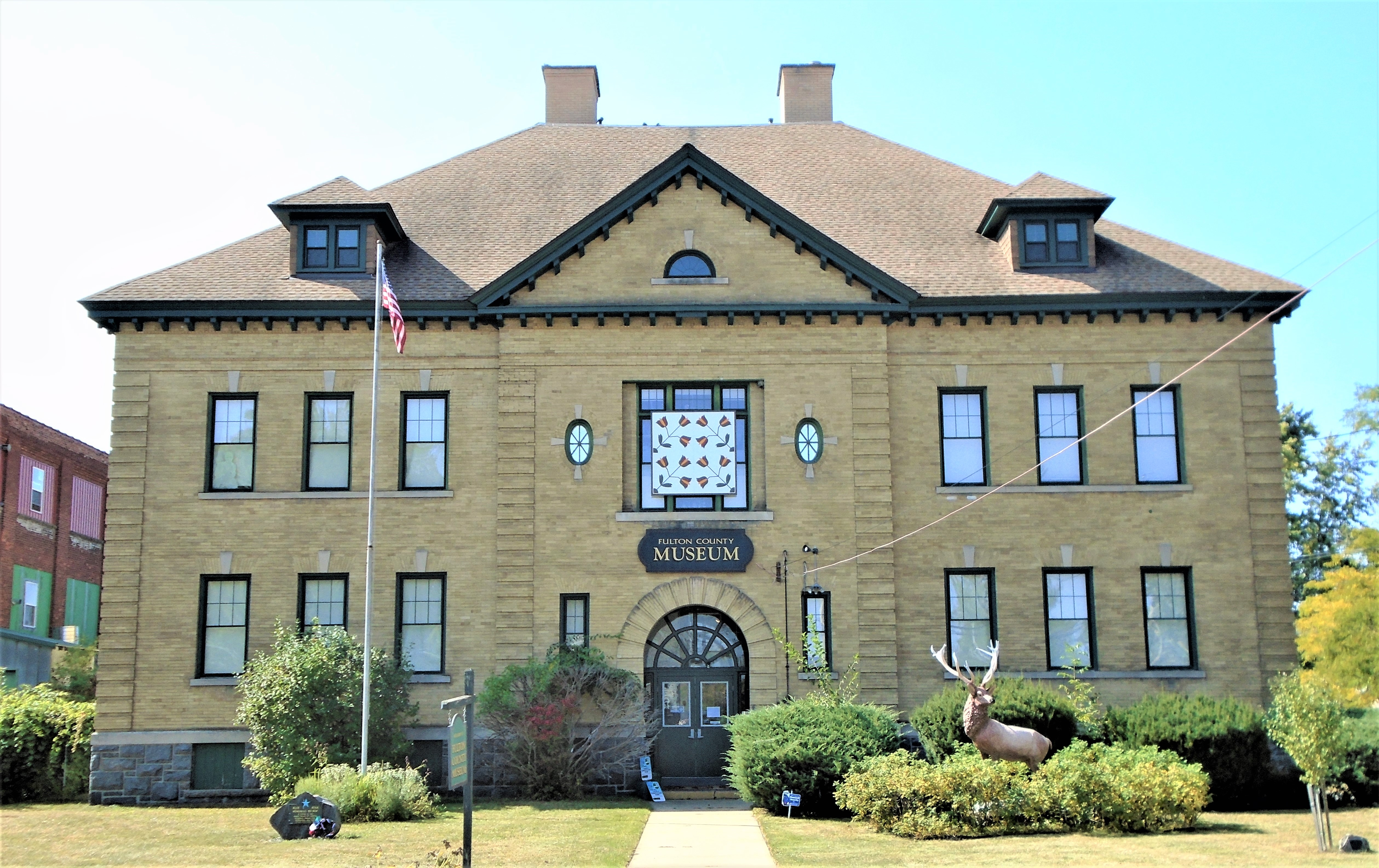
The Fulton County Historical Society operates the Fulton County Museum from a former public elementary school built in 1900

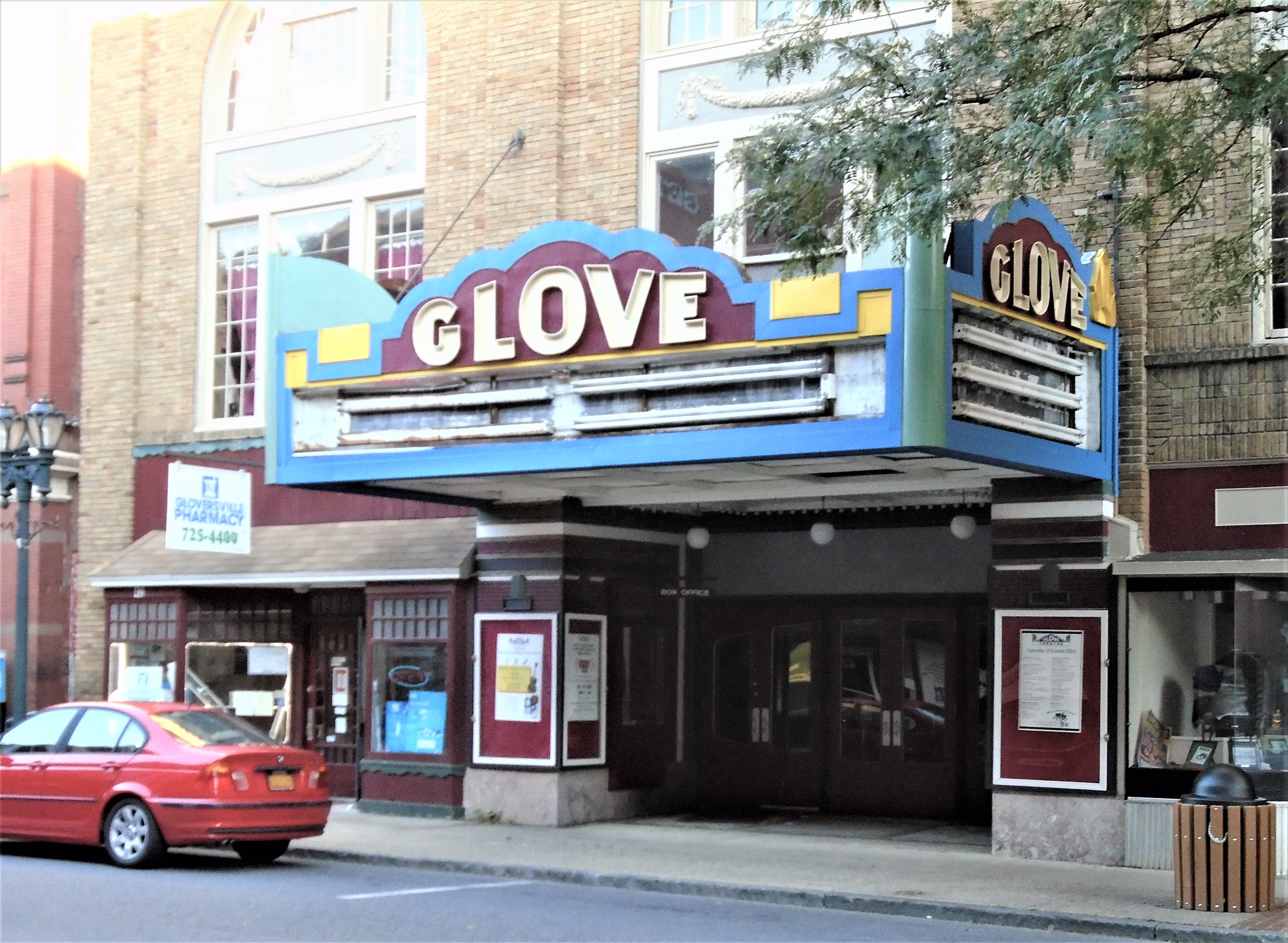
The Glove Theatre on North Main Street was the flagship of the Schine Enterprises chain

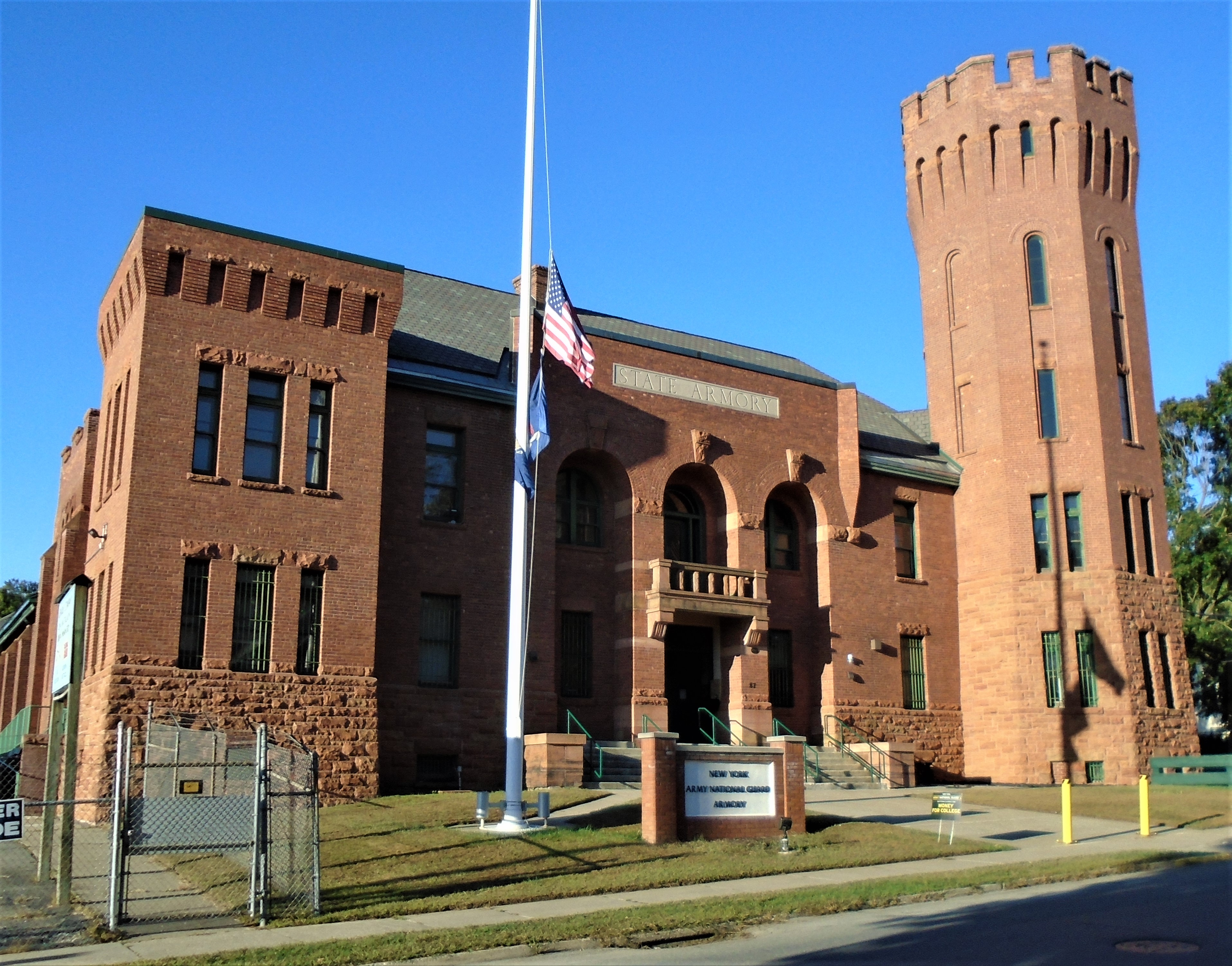
The Gloversville Armory was built in 1904. It is still used by the New York Army National Guard.

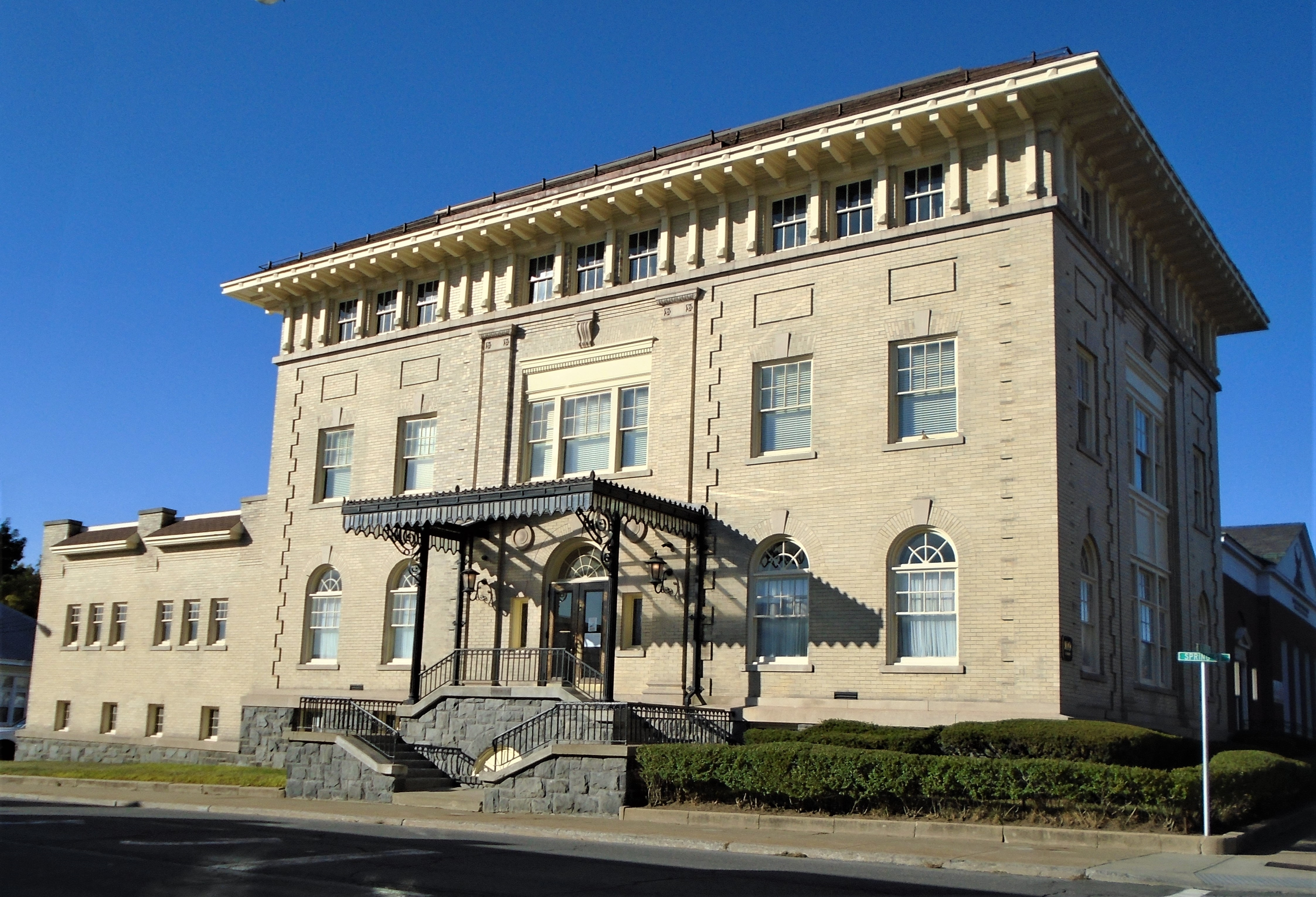
The Eccentric Club building, completed in 1908, is part of the Downtown Gloversville Historic District The club was founded in 1882.

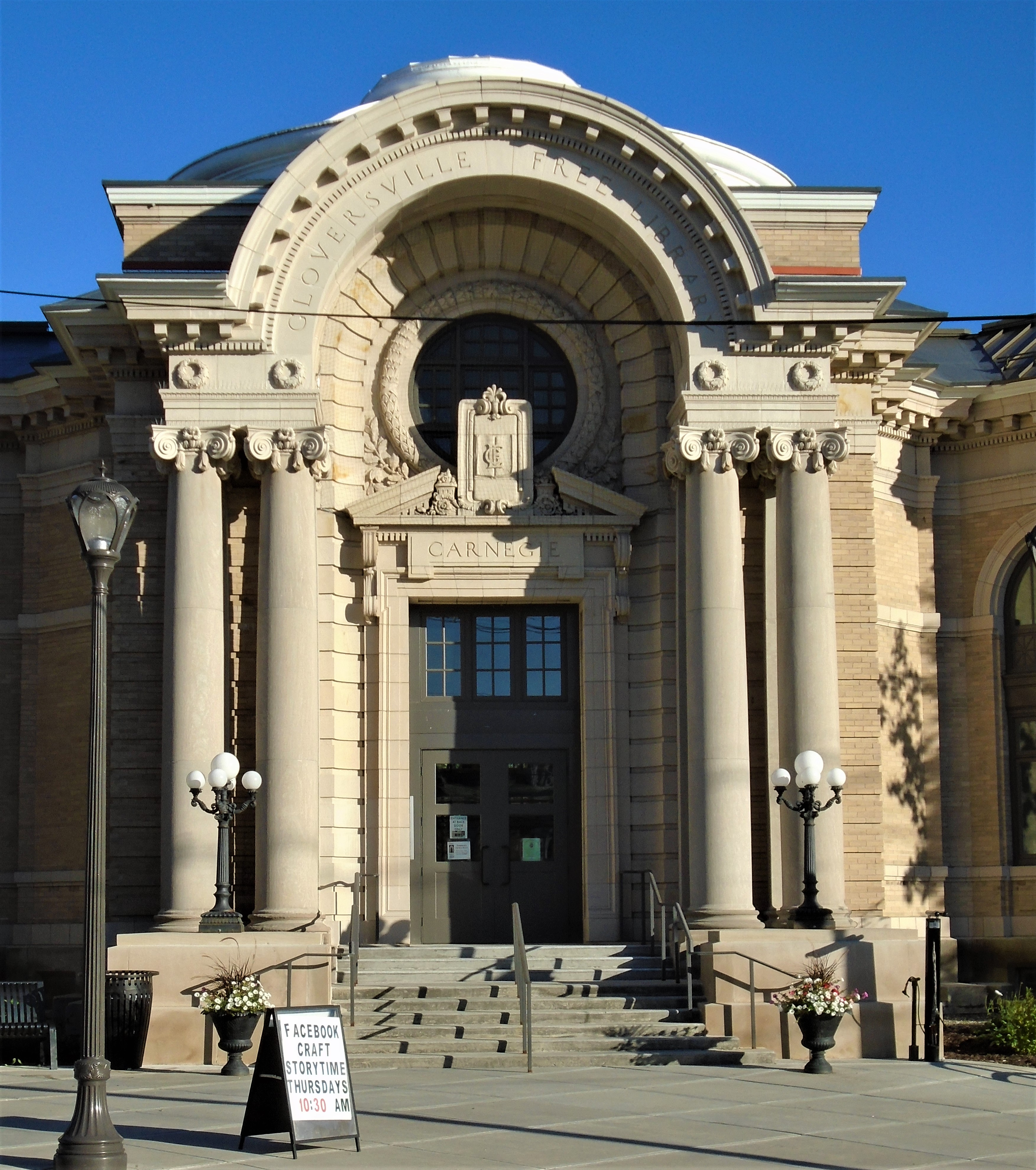
The Gloversville Public Library building is a Carnegie Library built in 1904
