= Downtown Gloversville Historic District =

Historic district in New York, United States

- U.S. National Register of Historic Places
- U.S. Historic district
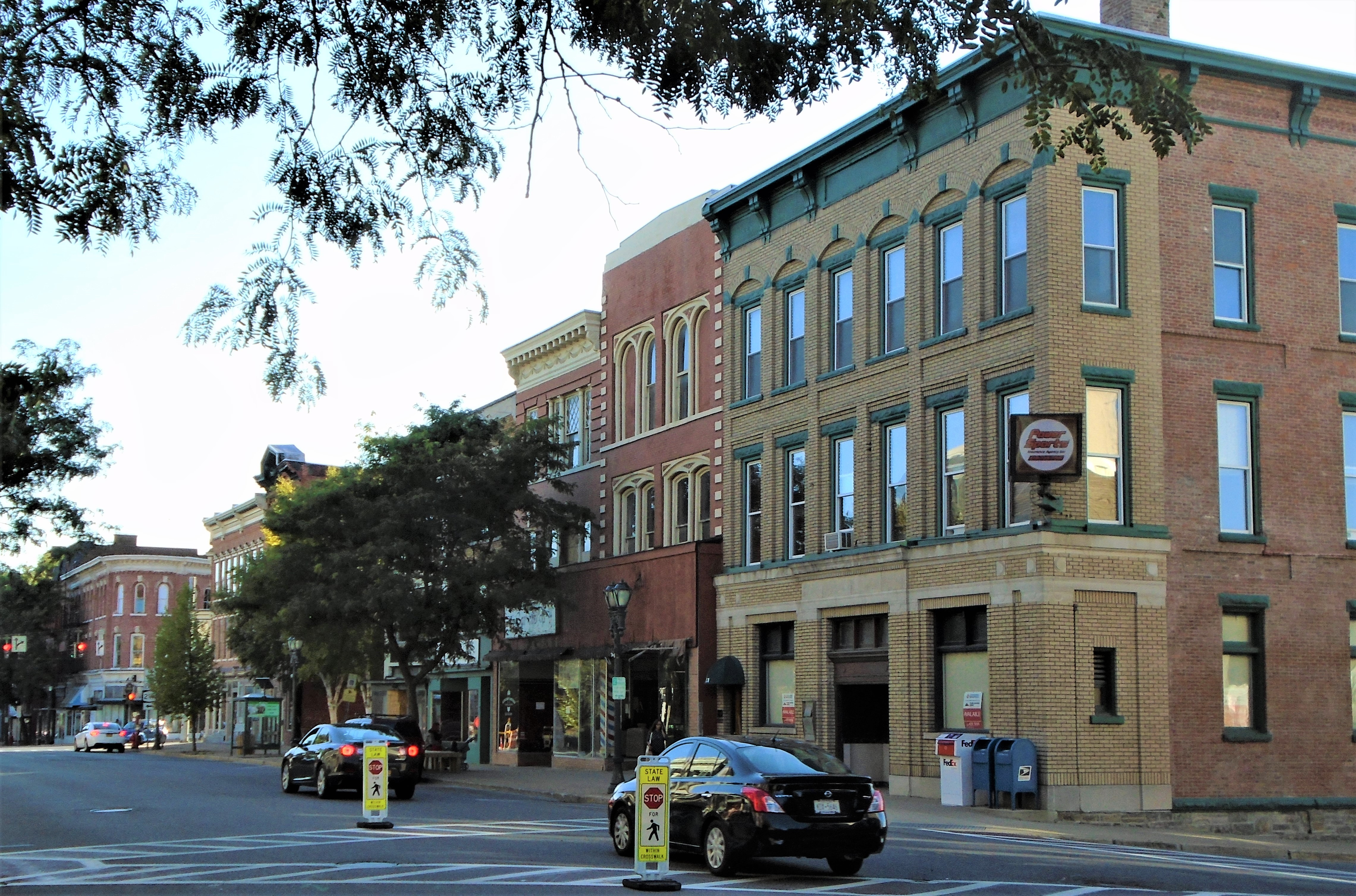
- The west side of North Main Street looking south from Church Street (2020)

- Location within New York Location within the United States
- Location: Roughly bounded by Spring, Prospect, W. and E. Fulton, N. and S. Main and Elm Sts., Gloversville, New York
- Coordinates: 43°3′3″N 74°20′43″W
- Area: 25 acres (10 ha)
- Built: pre-1850 - 1977
- Architect: multiple
- Architectural style: Classical Revival; Renaissance Revival; Romanesque Revival; Second Empire; Art Deco; Italianate
- NRHP reference No.: 85002367
- Added to NRHP: September 12, 1985

The Downtown Gloversville Historic District is a national historic district located in Gloversville, Fulton County, New York. It is roughly bounded by Spring, Prospect, West and East Fulton, North and South Main, and Elm Streets.

The district contains 78 contributing buildings centered on the city's "four corners" formed at the intersection of Main and Fulton Streets, but also included properties on Church, Fremont, Spring and Prospect Streets. It encompasses the historic commercial district. Within the district boundaries, 79 percent of the buildings are commercial, eight percent religious, five percent residential, and the remaining service and educational. They range in age from pre-1850 to 1977, and are architecturally significant from pre-1850 to 1931. The majority were built 1870 to 1900, and include a variety of popular architectural styles, including Neoclassical, Renaissance Revival, Romanesque Revival, Second Empire, and Art Deco. The predominant commercial building style is Italianate and is a three-story brick structure with projecting, bracketed cornices and details.

The district was listed on the National Register of Historic Places in 1985.

== Gallery ==
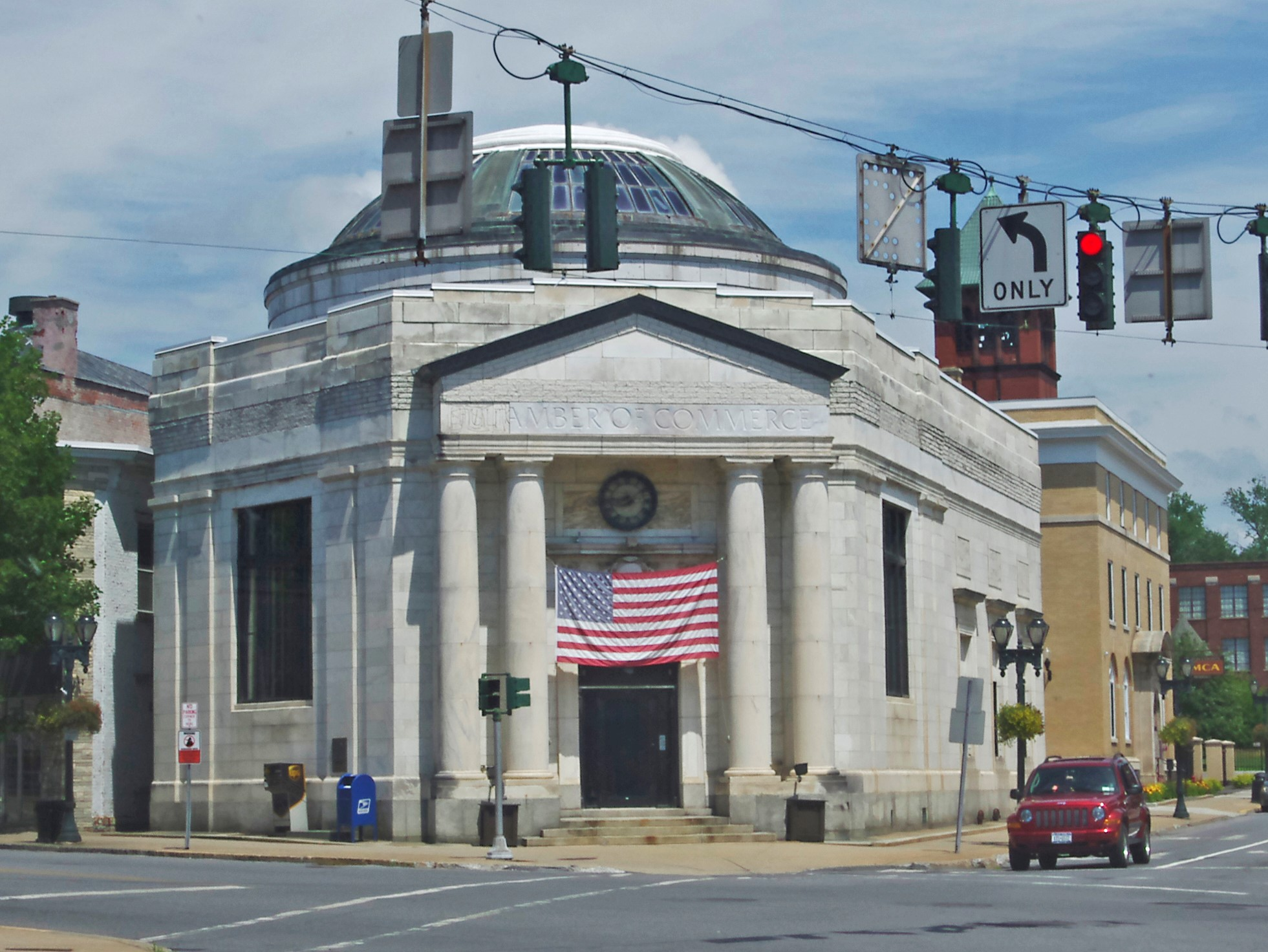
Chamber of Commerce Building (Neoclassical)

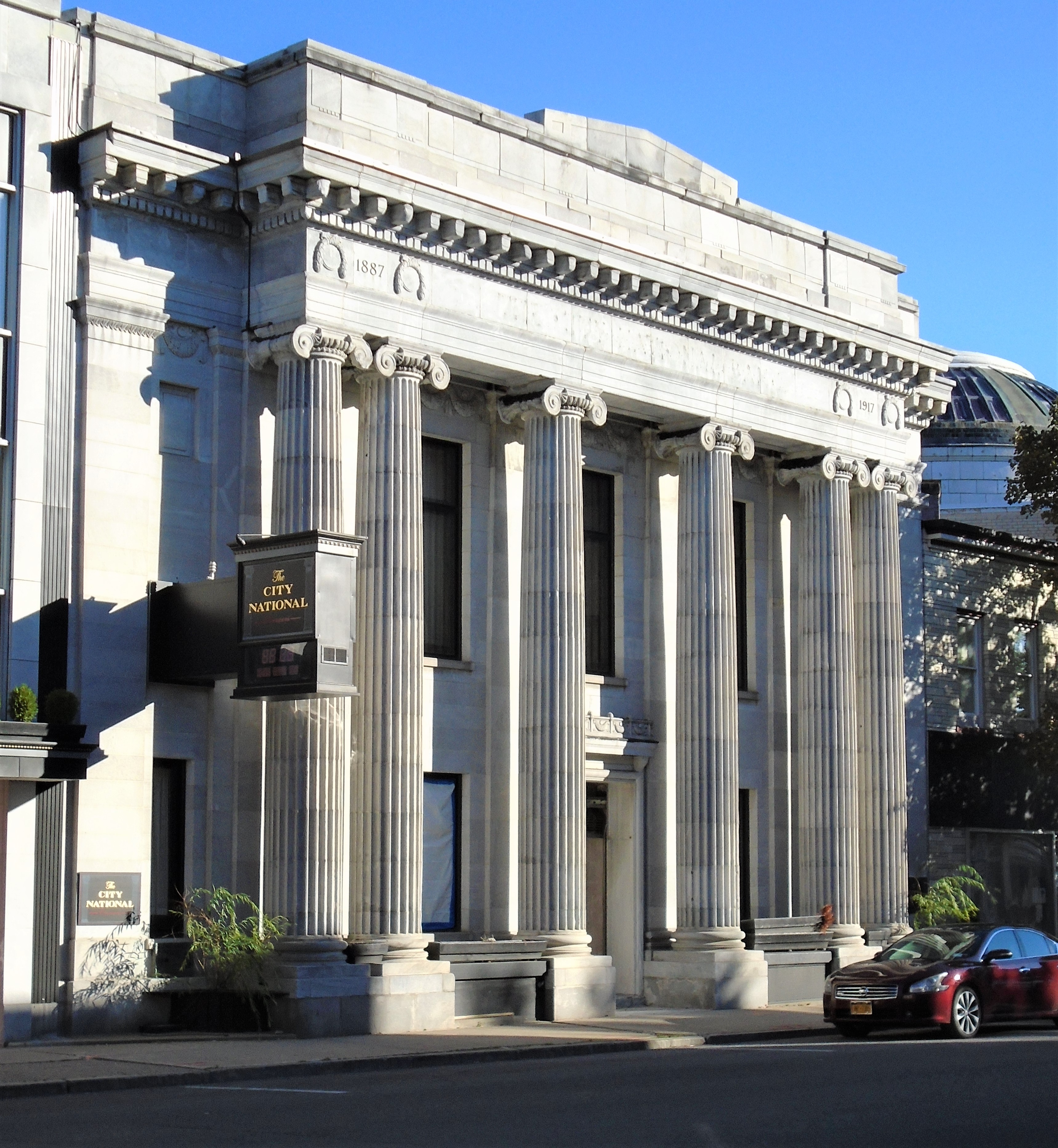
City National Bank Building (Neoclassical)

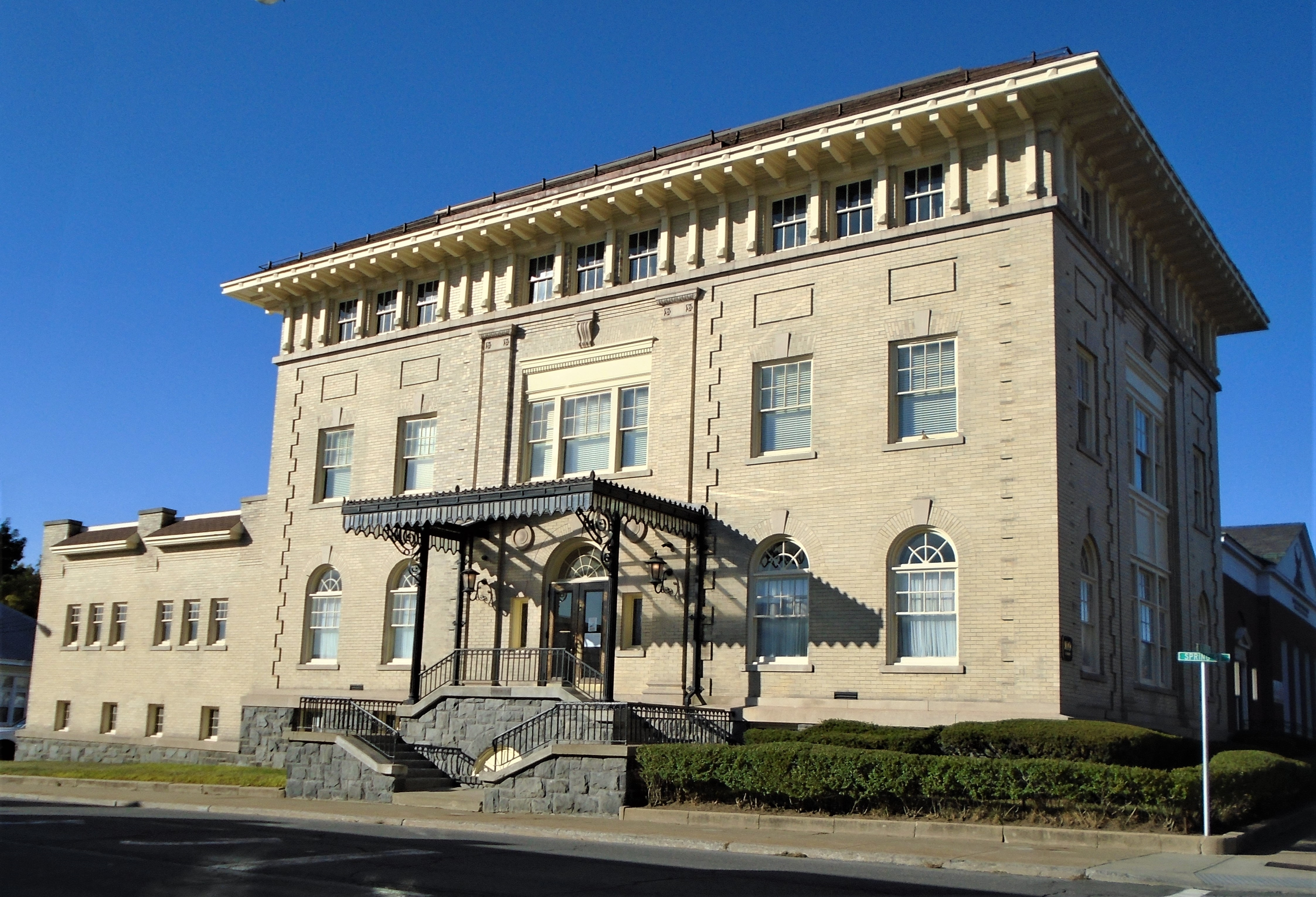
Eccentric Club (Renaissance Revival, 1908)

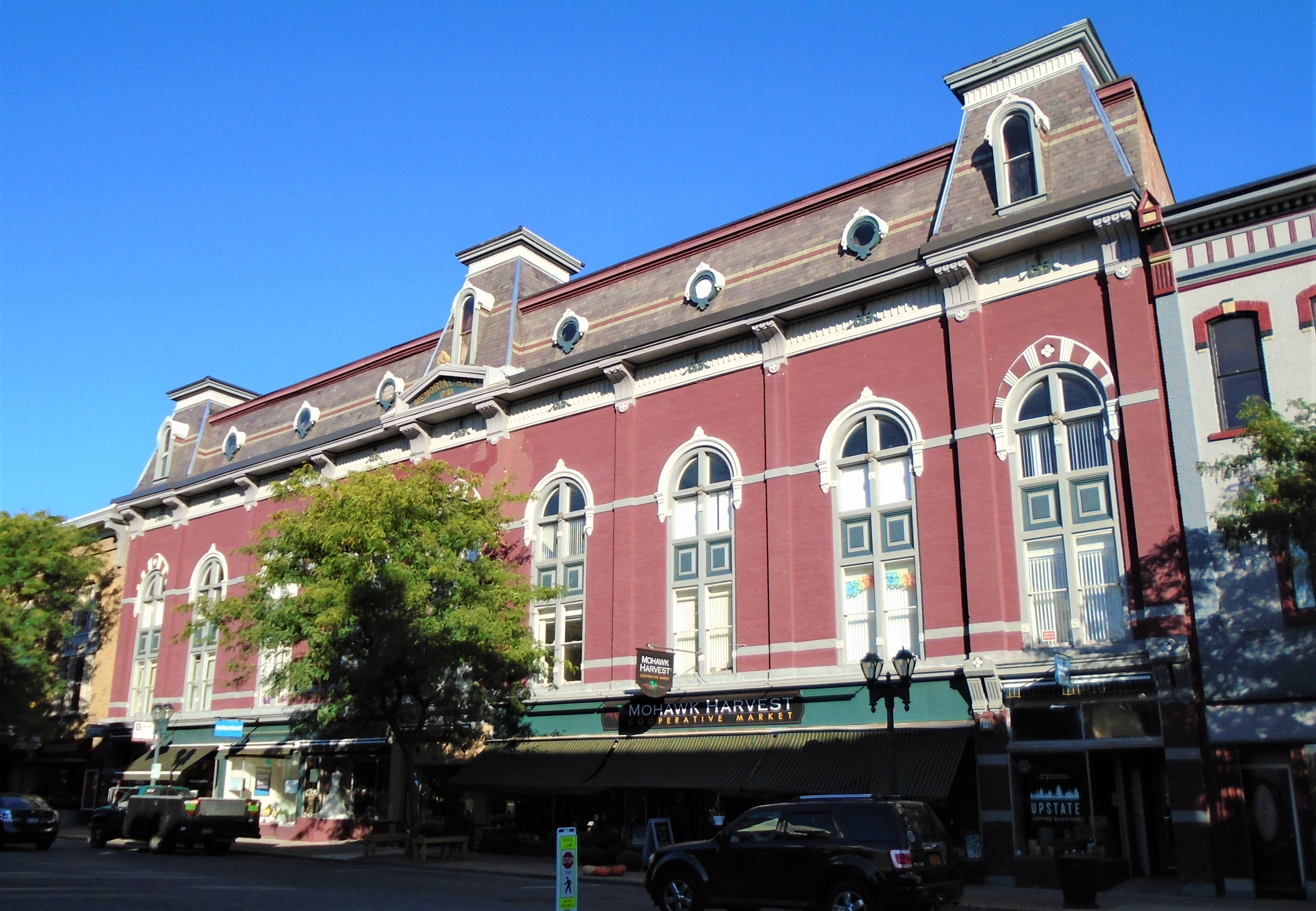
Schine Memorial Hall (Second Empire, 1881)

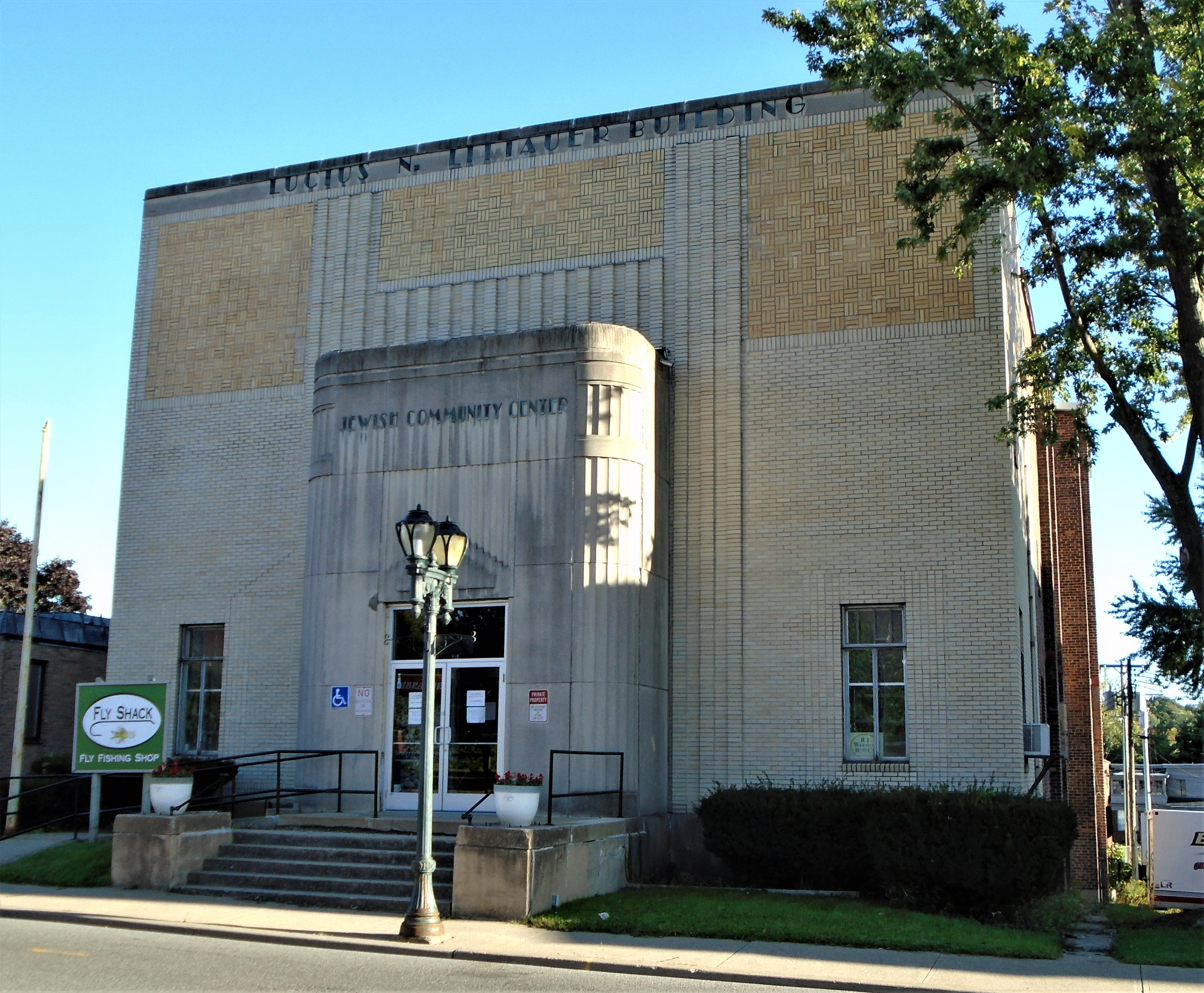
Lucius N. Littauer Building (Art Deco, 1929)

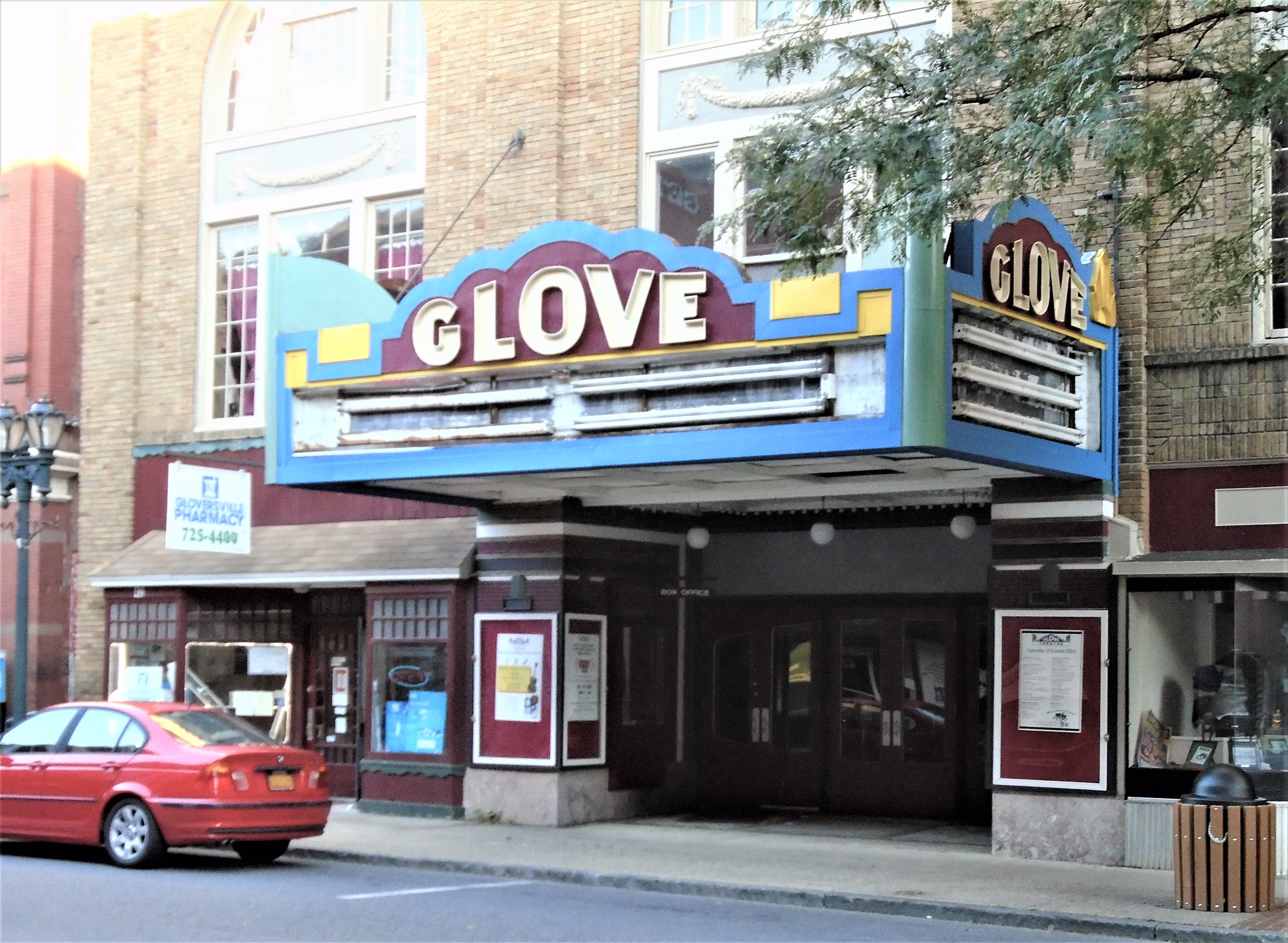
Glove Theater (1914)

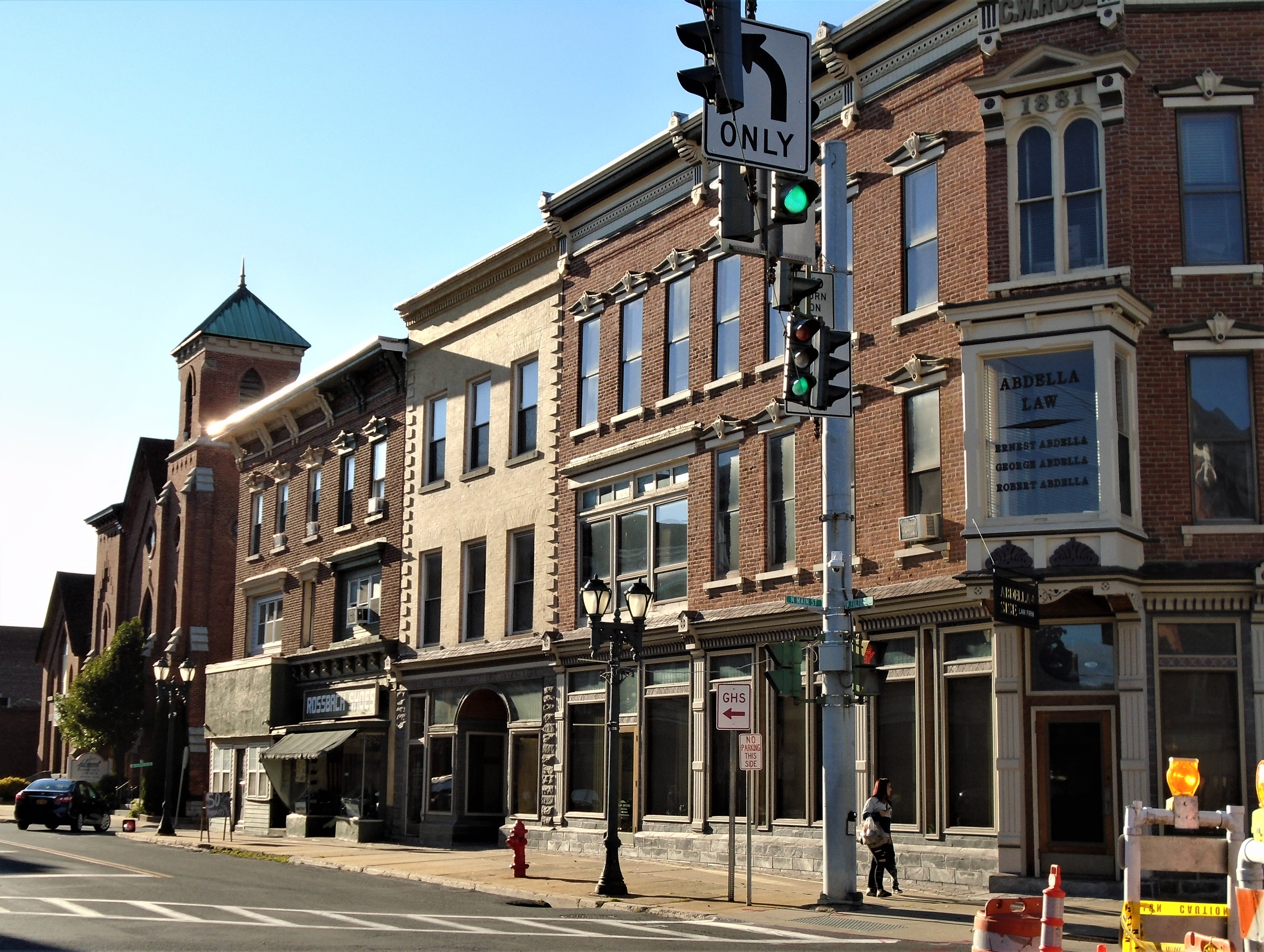
The north side of West Fulton Street viewed from North Main Street looking west
