= Orange Lawn Tennis Club =

Second oldest tennis club in New Jersey

Coordinates: 40.75447°N 74.26302°W

- Interactive map of Orange Lawn Tennis Club

Club information
- Location: South Orange, New Jersey
- Established: 1880
- Type: Private
- Website: www.orangelawn.com

The Orange Lawn Tennis Club is the second oldest tennis club in New Jersey. Located in South Orange, it was established three years after the Seabright Lawn Tennis and Cricket Club in Rumson.

== History ==
The club was founded on October 4, 1880, with Richard J. Cross as its first president, and was situated on a 10-acre site (Note: Previously, this had been a cricket pitch.) at the corner of Berkley Avenue and Montrose Avenue. In April 1882, it was reported to have eight courts and about 100 members. By 1916 there was a demand for more courts and better facilities, resulting in the purchase of the 42-acre Hillside estate on Ridgewood Avenue from H. Charles Hoskier, a former club president. The brownstone mansion on the estate, built by prominent resident William Redmond, (Note: William Redmond (1804–1874), a prominent merchant with Wm. Redmond & Son, was the father of Goold H. Redmond, Annie Redmond Cross (wife of the Club's first president, Richard James Cross), Frances Redmond Livingston, (the wife of Henry Beekman Livingston). among others.) was turned into the clubhouse. The club opened its new location, with six dirt courts and 14 grass courts, in August 1917.

In 2018, when it was purchased by a group of investors headed by real estate developer Bruce Schonbraun, the club was one of the few in the United States to still retain any grass courts.

In May 1881, Orange Lawn became one of the founding members of the United States Tennis Association. The organisation's first vice-president, Samuel Campbell, was a member of the club. In 1887, it hosted the men's doubles event of the US Open, then called the U.S. National Championship. The club also hosted the Eastern Grass Court Championships. The American Zone final of the 1946 Davis Cup, in which the United States defeated Mexico 5–0, was held at the club.

== Former tournaments ==
Former notable tournaments staged by the club.

- Eastern Grass Court Championships (1946–1969), renamed the Marlboro Open Championships in 1970
- Middle States Championships
- Mutual Benefit Life Open
- Orange Spring Tournament
- Orange LTC Open
- Orange Invitation
- South Orange Open
- Tennis Week Open
