= William Redmond (merchant) =

Irish-American merchant

William Redmond (October 22, 1804 – September 13, 1874) was an Irish-born American merchant.

== Early life ==
Redmond was born in Ballymena, County Antrim, Ireland on October 22, 1804. He was a son of cattle dealer Samuel Redmond (1780–1825) and Anne (née Ramage) Redmond (1780–1847), who was related to the Moores of Moore Lodge, Ballymoney, and the McNeales of Ballycastle, both in County Antrim.

== Career ==
At the age of 17, Redmond moved from Ireland to Charleston, South Carolina before settling in New York City. He was the founder of Wm. Redmond & Sons. He was one of the founders of the Union Club.

In New York, the Redmonds lived at 6 North Washington Square. After spending two summers in Orange, he purchased the Squire farm in South Orange, New Jersey in 1850, including the Squire homestead built in 1774. There he built a large brownstone mansion called Hillside, which, today, is the clubhouse of the Orange Lawn Tennis Club. (Note: Orange Lawn Tennis Club purchased the former Redwood estate, a 42-acre property on Ridgewood, from H. Charles Hoskier in 1916.)

== Personal life ==
Redmond married Sabina Elizabeth Hoyt (1812–1870), a daughter of Sabina (née Sheaff) Hoyt and Goold Hoyt Jr., native of Norwalk, Connecticut who was a merchant with Hoyt & Tom and was involved with the East India and China trade and one of the founders of the Merchants' Exchange National Bank. The niece of Jesse Hoyt, a Collector of the Port of New York who was known for his role in the Swartwout-Hoyt scandal, she was also sister to Lydig Monson Hoyt (who married Blanche Geraldine Livingston (a daughter of Maturin Livingston) and Henry Sheaffe Hoyt (who married Frances Duer, a daughter of Judge William Alexander Duer), and Goold Hoyt III (who married Adeline Camilla Scott, a daughter of Gen. Winfield Scott). Together, they were the parents of ten children, including:

- William Redmond Jr. (1835–1898), who married Mary Lawrence Griffin, a daughter of Lt. William Preston Griffin. (Note: After the death of Mary's mother in 1841, her father William Preston Griffin (1810–1851), a cousin of Rear Admiral William Radford, married Christine Alexander William Kean, the youngest surviving daughter of Peter Philip James Kean (son of Continental Congressman John Kean) and Sarah Sabina Morris (a granddaughter of Founding Father Lewis Morris).)
- Sabina Redmond (1836–1905), who married Glasgow native, John Walter Wood, who went into business with his brother-in-law under the name Wood & Redmond (later J. Walter Wood & Co.).
- Goold Hoyt Redmond (1838–1906), a sportsmen and prominent member of society during the Gilded Age who never married.
- Henry Redmond (1840–1928), who married Lydia Smallwood, relative of Gen. William Smallwood, in 1864.
- Mary Redmond (1841–1879), who died unmarried.
- Emily "Demi" Redmond (1843–1934), who cared for the Cross children following her sister's 1883 death.
- Roland Redmond (1845–1894), who married Helen Clark Bulkeley, a sister to Edward H. Bulkeley.
- Matilda Redmond (1847–1883), who married banker Richard James Cross, brother-in-law of English novelist Mary Anne (née Evans) Cross (better known by her pen name George Eliot).
- Frances Redmond (1849–1916), who married, as his second wife, Henry Beekman Livingston.
- Annie Redmond (1852–1929), who married R.J. Cross in 1885, after her sister Matilda's death in 1883.
- Gerald Redmond (1854–1918), who married Estelle Maude Livingston, a daughter of Johnston Swift Livingston and first cousin of Henry Beekman Livingston.

His wife died in 1870 in New York and was interred at New York Marble Cemetery. Redmond died at his home in New York City on September 13, 1874, and was buried at Green-Wood Cemetery in Brooklyn.

=== Descendants ===
Through his daughter Matilda, he was the grandfather six, all born at Hillside in South Orange, including: architects John Walter Cross and Eliot Cross; Eleanor Cross Marquand, an authority on "the representation and symbolism of flowers and trees in art" who married Allan Marquand (son of financier Henry Gurdon Marquand); and William Redmond Cross, a partner in the banking firm of Redmond & Co., who married Julia Newbold (daughter of New York State Senator Thomas Newbold); (Note: Julia Appleton Newbold (1891–1972) was a direct descendant of Thomas Jefferson through her mother, Sarah Lawrence Coolidge (1858–1922), who was the daughter of T. Jefferson Coolidge, a Boston Brahmin businessman who served as the U.S. Minister to France under President Harrison, and Mehitable Sullivan "Hetty" (née Appleton) Coolidge.)
