= 1871 New York state election =

- November 7, 1871

The 1871 New York state election was held on November 7, 1871, to elect the Secretary of State, the State Comptroller, the Attorney General, the State Treasurer, the State Engineer, a Canal Commissioner and an Inspector of State Prisons, as well as all members of the New York State Assembly and the New York State Senate.

== History ==
The Democratic state convention met on October 4 at Rochester, New York, and re-nominated six of the seven incumbents. Only Diedrich Willers, Jr., was nominated for Secretary of State in place of Homer A. Nelson.

== Results ==
In the wake of the Tweed and Canal Ring scandals, the whole Republican ticket was elected.

The incumbents Nichols, Champlain, Bristol, Richmond, Chapman and McNeil were defeated.

97 Republicans, 25 Democrats and 6 Reform Democrats were elected for the session of 1872 to the New York State Assembly.

1871 state election results
Office	Republican ticket		Democratic ticket		Anti-Dram-Shop ticket	
Secretary of State	G. Hilton Scribner	387,119	Diedrich Willers, Jr.	368,212	Chas C. Leigh	1,820
Comptroller	Nelson K. Hopkins	387,703	Asher P. Nichols	367,127	Gardner Howland	1,824
Attorney General	Francis C. Barlow	387,072	Marshall B. Champlain	367,754	Edward Crummy	1,719
Treasurer	Thomas Raines	388,360	Wheeler H. Bristol	366,576	Simeon Brownell	1,802
State Engineer	William B. Taylor	387,284	Van Rensselaer Richmond	367,615	Charles J. mills	1,820
Canal Commissioner	Alexander Barkley	387,936	George W. Chapman	366,499	John B. Edwards	1,826
Inspector of State Prisons	Thomas Kirkpatrick	387,359	David B. McNeil	365,650	William Marks	1,827

== See also ==
- New York state elections

== Sources ==
- Result: THE STATE ELECTION.; Official Announcement of the Result of the Vote for State Officers in NYT on December 9, 1871 [without vote for State Engineer]
- Result in The Tribune Almanac 1872
