= Richard James Cross =

Railroad official and banker (1845–1917)

- Born: November 3, 1845; Liverpool, England
- Died: March 30, 1917 (aged 71); Miami, Florida, U.S.
- Education: Marlborough College
- Spouses: Matilda Redmond (m. 1872; died 1883) Annie Redmond (m. 1885)
- Children: 6, including Eleanor, John, Eliot
- Parent(s): William Cross; Anna Chalmers Wood Cross
- Relatives: George Eliot (sister-in-law); Mary F. Cross (sister)

Richard James Cross (November 3, 1845 – March 30, 1917) was an English born railroad official and banker who was a prominent member of New York society during the Gilded Age.

== Early life ==
Cross was born in Liverpool, England, on November 3, 1845. He was the son of William Cross (1809–1862), an English financier with J & A Dennistoun, and Anna Chalmers (née Wood) Cross (1812–1878), his Scottish-born wife. His brother, John Walter Cross, a commission agent, was the husband of the English novelist Mary Anne (née Evans) Cross, known by her pen name George Eliot, having married her a few months before her death in 1880.

He was educated at Marlborough College in Marlborough, Wiltshire, England.

== Career ==
After his move to America following his graduation from college, Cross began working as railroad official, first in New Orleans then in New York. His uncle, William Wood, worked in New York at Dennistoun, Wood & Co.

Cross later became a member of the New York banking firm of Morton, Bliss & Co., led by former New York Governor Levi P. Morton, from 1878 until his retirement in 1899. He also served as a director of the Manhattan Trust Co., U.S. Lloyds, Commercial Union Assurance Co., Palatine Insurance Co., Atlas Insurance Co., and the Caledonian Insurance Co.

=== Society life ===
In 1892, Cross (along with his wife's brother Goold, sister Frances and her husband Henry) were included in Ward McAllister's "Four Hundred", purported to be an index of New York's best families, published in The New York Times. Conveniently, 400 was the number of people that could fit into Mrs. Astor's ballroom. Cross, who was known as "the wittiest man in N.Y." was a member of the Century Association and helped organize the Racquet and Tennis Club in 1890.

== Personal life ==
On June 3, 1872, Cross was married to the American Matilda Redmond (1838–1883). She was the daughter of wealthy merchant William Redmond and Sabina Elizabeth (née Hoyt) Redmond. Among her many siblings was Goold H. Redmond, Sabina Redmond Wood, Henry Redmond, Mary Redmond, Emily Redmond, Frances Redmond (the wife of Henry Beekman Livingston). Her grandfather, Goold Hoyt, was a merchant with Hoyt & Tom who was involved with the East India and China trade and was one of the founders of the Merchants' Exchange National Bank. Together, Matilda and Richard were the parents of six children, all born at Hillside (the stone villa of their grandfather in South Orange, New Jersey), namely:

- Eleanor Cross (1873–1950), an authority on "the representation and symbolism of flowers and trees in art" who married Allan Marquand (1853–1924), the curator of the Princeton University Art Museum who was the son of financier Henry Gurdon Marquand.
- William Redmond Cross (1874–1940), a Yale graduate of 1896 who became a partner in the banking firm of Redmond & Co. He married Julia Newbold, (Note: Julia Appleton Newbold (1891–1972) was a direct descendant of Thomas Jefferson through her mother, Sarah Lawrence Coolidge (1858–1922), who was the daughter of T. Jefferson Coolidge, a Boston Brahmin businessman who served as the U.S. Minister to France under President Harrison, and Mehitable Sullivan "Hetty" (née Appleton) Coolidge.) the daughter of New York State Senator Thomas Newbold, in 1913.
- Mary Redmond Cross (1875–1942), a director of the Association for the Aid of Crippled Children who did not marry.
- John Walter Cross (1878–1951), an architect.
- Emily Redmond Cross (1879–1955), who served in French hospitals as a nurse during World War I and who did not marry.
- Eliot Buchanan Cross (1883–1949), also an architect.

His wife Matilda died in 1883, just months after the birth of their youngest child Eliot, and the entire Cross family moved into 6 Washington Square in New York, the home of his late wife's family. Matilda's sister Emily, who was called Demi, cared for the children, and two years later on May 16, 1885, Richard married another Redmond sister, Annie Redmond (1852–1929),

The Crosses also maintained a massive stone Tudor summer home in Newfoundland in northern New Jersey, known as "Cross Castle", (Note: Cross himself referred to the residence as "Bearfort House.") and built in 1907. The estate, built at an estimated cost of $1,500,000, consisted of "365 acres of wooded glens, fields, and farm lands, along with a 77-acre pristine water body known as Hank’s Pond."

Cross died in Miami, Florida, on March 30, 1917.

=== Descendants ===
Through his eldest son, he was the grandfather of Emily Redmond Cross (c. 1914 – 2006), who married John Kenyon Vaughan-Morgan, a Member of Parliament for Reigate who was the son of the Sir Kenyon Vaughan-Morgan and the Lady Vaughan-Morgan of London, in March 1940.
