= Logical machine =

Tool for performing logic operations

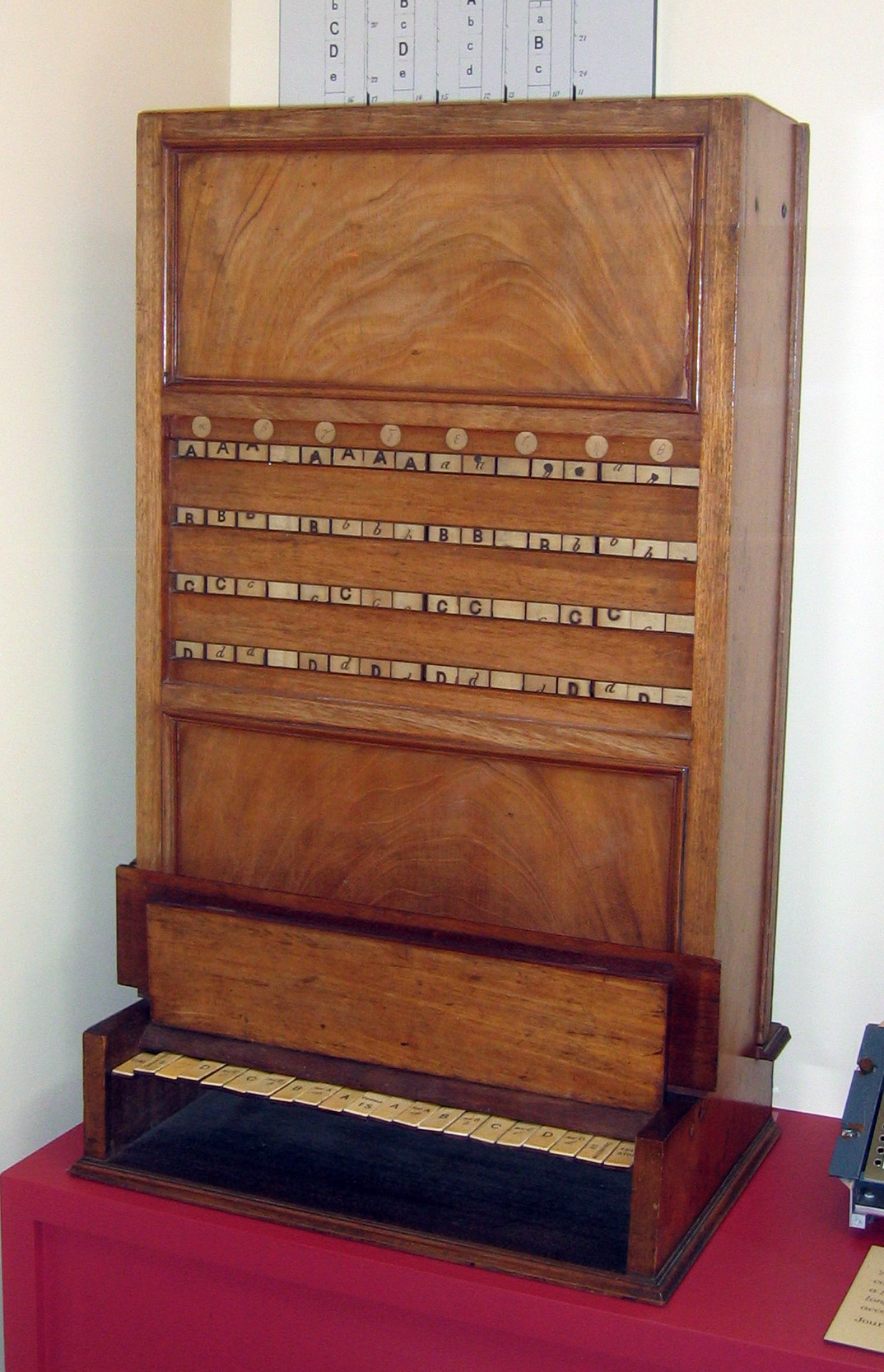
Jevons' Logic Piano in the Sydney Powerhouse Museum in 2006

A logical machine or logical abacus is a tool containing a set of parts that uses energy to perform formal logic operations through the use of truth tables. Early logical machines were mechanical devices that performed basic operations in Boolean logic. The principal examples of such machines are those of William Stanley Jevons (logic piano), John Venn, and Allan Marquand.

Contemporary logical machines are computer-based electronic programs that perform proof assistance with theorems in mathematical logic. In the 21st century, these proof assistant programs have given birth to a new field of study called mathematical knowledge management.

== Origins ==
The earliest logical machines were mechanical constructs built in the late 19th century. William Stanley Jevons invented the first logical machine in 1869, the logic piano. In 1883, Allan Marquand invented a new logical machine that performed the same operations as Jevons' logic piano but with improvements in design simplification, portability, and input-output controls.

A logical abacus is constructed to show all the possible combinations of a set of logical terms with their negatives, and, further, the way in which these combinations are affected by the addition of attributes or other limiting words, i.e., to simplify mechanically the solution of logical problems. These instruments are all more or less elaborate developments of the "logical slate", on which were written in vertical columns all the combinations of symbols or letters which could be made logically out of a definite number of terms. These were compared with any given premises, and those which were incompatible were crossed off. In the abacus the combinations are inscribed each on a single slip of wood or similar substance, which is moved by a key; incompatible combinations can thus be mechanically removed at will, in accordance with any given series of premises.

== See also ==
- Logics for computability
- Stanhope Demonstrator

== Bibliography ==
- Bennett, Deborah (2005). Logic Made Easy: How to Know When Language Deceives You. W. W. Norton & Company. p. 163. ISBN 0393326926. "Allan Marquand logic machine."
- Marquand, Allan
  - (1883), "A Machine for Producing Syllogistic Variation" in C. S. Peirce, ed., Studies in Logic, pp. 12–15, along with "Note on an Eight-Term Logical Machine", p. 16. Google Books Eprint. Book reprinted 1983 with introduction by Max Fisch.
  - (1886), "A New Logical Machine", Proceedings of the American Academy of Arts and Sciences 21: 303–07. Google Books Eprint.
- Peirce, C. S.
  - (1886 letter), Letter, Peirce to A. Marquand, 1886 December 30, published 1993 in Kloesel, C. et al., eds., Writings of Charles S. Peirce: A Chronological Edition, Vol. 5. Indiana Univ. Press, pp. 421–3. Google Books Preview.
  - (1887), "Logical Machines", The American Journal of Psychology v. 1, n. 1, Baltimore: N. Murray, pp. 165–70. Google Books Eprint. Reprinted in (1976) The New Elements of Mathematics v. III, pt. 1, pp. 625–32; (1997) Modern Logic 7:71–77, Project Euclid Eprint; and (2000) Writings of Charles S. Peirce v. 6, pp. 65–73.
- Baldwin, Mark James (1902), "Logical Machine", Dictionary of Philosophy and Psychology, pp. 28–30 Google Books Eprint. Classics in the History of Psychology Eprint.
- Ketner, Kenneth Laine (1984), "The early history of computer design: Charles Sanders Peirce and Marquand's logical machines", with the assistance of Arthur Franklin Stewart, Princeton University Library Chronicle, v. 45, n. 3, pp. 186–211. PULC 15MB PDF Eprint.
- Dalakov, Georgi (undated), "Charles Peirce and Allan Marquand", History of Computers and Computing. Eprint.
