= Mary Cross =

Mary Cross may refer to:

- Mary Ann Cross (1819–1880), married name of novelist George Eliot
- Mary F. Cross (1843–1902), Scottish author
- Mary Cross Lynch (1860–1927), Scottish novelist and poet
- Mary Cross (writer) (born 1934), American professor, editor, writer and biographer
