= 1873 New York state election =

- November 4, 1873

The 1873 New York state election was held on November 4, 1873, to elect the Secretary of State, the State Comptroller, the Attorney General, the State Treasurer, the State Engineer, a Canal Commissioner and an Inspector of State Prisons, as well as all members of the New York State Assembly and the New York State Senate. Besides, the voters were asked if the judges of the New York Court of Appeals, the New York Supreme Court, and the county and city courts, shall be elected or appointed; the electorate decided to maintain the elective system.

== History ==
The Republican state convention met on September 24 at the Opera House in Utica, New York. David J. Mitchell was Temporary Chairman until the choice of Stewart L. Woodford as president. Francis S. Thayer was nominated for Secretary of State by acclamation. The incumbent Comptroller Nelson K. Hopkins was re-nominated by acclamation. Daniel G. Fort was nominated for Treasurer after a "rising vote, when the whole convention, except a score, stood up in favor of Mr. Fort." Benjamin D. Silliman was nominated for Attorney General on the first ballot (vote: Silliman 262, B. Platt Carpenter 162). The incumbent State Engineer William B. Taylor was re-nominated. Sidney Mead was nominated for Canal Commissioner on the first ballot (vote: Mead 185, Charles K. Monell 118, John Napier 41, Hiram P. Wilbur 33). Moss K. Platt was nominated for Prison Inspector on the first ballot with 238 votes.

The Democratic state convention met on October 2 at Utica, New York. Diedrich Willers, Jr., for Secretary of State, and Asher P. Nichols for Comptroller, were nominated by acclamation. Daniel Pratt was nominated for Attorney General on the first ballot (vote: Pratt 82, James B. Olney 26, Rufus W. Peckham, Jr. 13). The incumbent Treasurer Thomas Raines was re-nominated by acclamation. Sylvanus H. Sweet was nominated for State Engineer after several ballots. James Jackson, Jr. was nominated for Canal Commissioner, and George W. Millspaugh for Prison Inspector.

== Results ==
Five Democrats and two Republicans were elected to state offices.

The incumbents Hopkins and Raines were re-elected. The incumbent Taylor was defeated.

1873 state election results
Office	Democratic ticket		Republican ticket		Prohibition ticket	
Secretary of State	Diedrich Willers, Jr.	339,794	Francis S. Thayer	330,563	Dwight Williams	3,238
Comptroller	Asher P. Nichols	333,927	Nelson K. Hopkins	337,992	David T. Eliot	2,563
Attorney General	Daniel Pratt	340,463	Benjamin D. Silliman	330,357	Walter Farrington	3,281
Treasurer	Thomas Raines	342,046	Daniel G. Fort	329,241	Simeon Brownell	2,571
State Engineer	Sylvanus H. Sweet	342,067	William B. Taylor	327,363	Jonas C.B. Wallace	2,450
Canal Commissioner	James Jackson, Jr.	341,091	Sidney Mead	329,861	Thomas Edgerly	2,767
Inspector of State Prisons	George W. Millspaugh	333,812	Moss K. Platt	337,572	Isaac Harris	2,767

== See also ==
- New York state elections

== Sources ==
- The Republican ticket, and the questions asked: THE ELECTION IN THIS CITY in NYT on November 4, 1873
- Prohibition ticket and vote totals
- Vote totals: OFFICIAL RETURNS PREPARED BY THE STATE CANVASSERS in NYT on December 4, 1873 (Subscription required)
- Results: The Tribune Almanac 1874
