= South Orange Open =

Defunct tennis tournament
- Event name: South Orange Open
- Tour: Grand Prix circuit
- Founded: 1970
- Abolished: 1983
- Editions: 14
- Location: South Orange, New Jersey, US
- Venue: Orange Lawn Tennis Club
- Surface: Grass (1970–74); Clay (1975–83)

The South Orange Open, formerly known as the Eastern Grass Court Championships, is a defunct Grand Prix affiliated tennis tournament founded in 1970 as the Marlborough Open Championships and in existence until 1983. It was held in South Orange, New Jersey in the United States and played on outdoor grass courts from 1970 to 1974, and then played on outdoor clay courts from 1975 to 1983. There were men's and women's singles tournaments as well as men's, women's, and mixed doubles.

Ilie Năstase was the most successful player at the tournament, winning the singles competition three times on two different surfaces and the doubles competition twice with American Jimmy Connors.

== Results ==
=== Men's singles ===
| Year | Champions | Runners-up | Score |
|---|---|---|---|
| 1970 | (Australia) Rod Laver | (Australia) Bob Carmichael | 6–4, 6–2, 6–2 |
| 1971 | (United States) Clark Graebner | (France) Pierre Barthès | 6–3, 6–4, 6–4 |
| 1972 | (Romania) Ilie Năstase | (Spain) Manuel Orantes | 6–4, 6–4 |
| 1973 | (Australia) Colin Dibley | (India) Vijay Amritraj | 6–4, 6–7, 6–4 |
| 1974 | (Soviet Union) Alex Metreveli | (United States) Jimmy Connors | walkover |
| 1975 | (Romania) Ilie Năstase | (South Africa) Bob Hewitt | 7–6, 6–1 |
| 1976 | (Romania) Ilie Năstase | (United States) Roscoe Tanner | 6–4, 6–2 |
| 1977 | (Argentina) Guillermo Vilas | (United States) Roscoe Tanner | 6–4, 6–1 |
| 1978 | (Argentina) Guillermo Vilas | (Argentina) José Luis Clerc | 6–1, 6–3 |
| 1979 | (United States) John McEnroe | (United Kingdom) John Lloyd | 6–7, 6–4, 6–0 |
| 1980 | (Argentina) José Luis Clerc | (United States) John McEnroe | 6–3, 6–2 |
| 1981 | (Israel) Shlomo Glickstein | (United States) Dick Stockton | 6–3, 5–7, 6–4 |
| 1982 | (France) Yannick Noah | (Mexico) Raúl Ramírez | 6–3, 7–6 |
| 1983 | (Australia) Brad Drewett | (Australia) John Alexander | 4–6, 6–4, 7–6 |

=== Men's doubles ===
| Year | Champions | Runners-up | Score |
|---|---|---|---|
| 1970 | (Chile) Patricio Cornejo (Chile) Jaime Fillol | (Spain) Andrés Gimeno (Australia) Rod Laver | 6–2, 6–4 |
| 1971 | (Australia) Bob Carmichael (United States) Tom Leonard | (United States) Clark Graebner (United States) Erik van Dillen | 7–6, 6–7, 6–4 |
| 1972 | Not held | | |
| 1973 | (United States) Jimmy Connors (Romania) Ilie Năstase | (United States) Pancho Gonzales (United States) Tom Gorman | 6–7, 6–3, 6–2 |
| 1974 | (United States) Brian Gottfried (Mexico) Raúl Ramírez | (India) Anand Amritraj (India) Vijay Amritraj | 7–6, 6–7, 7–6 |
| 1975 | (United States) Jimmy Connors (Romania) Ilie Năstase | (Australia) Dick Crealy (United Kingdom) John Lloyd | 7–6, 7–5 |
| 1976 | (United States) Fred McNair (United States) Marty Riessen | (United States) Vitas Gerulaitis (Romania) Ilie Năstase | 7–5, 4–6, 6–2 |
| 1977 | (Australia) Colin Dibley (Poland) Wojciech Fibak | (Romania) Ion Țiriac (Argentina) Guillermo Vilas | 6–1, 7–5 |
| 1978 | (United States) Peter Fleming (United States) John McEnroe | (Romania) Ion Țiriac (Argentina) Guillermo Vilas | 6–3, 6–3 |
| 1979 | (United States) Peter Fleming (United States) John McEnroe | (United States) Fritz Buehning (United States) Bruce Nichols | 6–1, 6–3 |
| 1980 | (United States) Bill Maze (United States) John McEnroe | (United States) Fritz Buehning (United States) Van Winitsky | 7–6, 6–4 |
| 1981 | (United States) Fritz Buehning (Zimbabwe) Andrew Pattison | (Israel) Shlomo Glickstein (Israel) David Schneider | 6–1, 6–4 |
| 1982 | (Mexico) Raúl Ramírez (United States) Van Winitsky | (United States) Jai DiLouie (United States) Blaine Willenborg | 3–6, 6–4, 6–1 |
| 1983 | (United States) Fritz Buehning (United States) Tom Cain | (United Kingdom) John Lloyd (United States) Dick Stockton | 6–2, 7–5 |

=== Women's singles ===
(incomplete roll)

| Year | Champions | Runners-up | Score |
|---|---|---|---|
| 1970 | (Australia) Kerry Melville | (United States) Patti Hogan | 7–6, 6–4. |

=== Women's doubles ===
(incomplete roll)

| Year | Champions | Runners-up | Score |
|---|---|---|---|
| 1970 | (United States) Rosie Casals (United Kingdom) Virginia Wade | (France) Gail Chanfreau (France) Francoise Durr | 6–3, 6–4. |

== See also ==
- Orange Spring Tournament
- Orange LTC Open
- Orange Invitation
