= 1975 South Orange Open =

- Date: August 18–24
- Edition: 6th
- Category: Grand Prix (Group B)
- Draw: 32S / 16D
- Prize money: $50,000
- Surface: Clay / outdoor
- Location: South Orange, U.S.
- Venue: Orange Lawn Tennis Club

Champions

Singles
- (Romania) Ilie Năstase

Doubles
- (United States) Jimmy Connors / (Romania) Ilie Năstase
← 1974 ·	South Orange Open	· 1976 →

The 1975 South Orange Open, also known as the Tennis Week Open, was a men's tennis tournament played on outdoor clay courts at the Orange Lawn Tennis Club in South Orange, New Jersey in the United States. It was classified as a Group B category tournament and was part of the 1975 Grand Prix circuit. It was the sixth edition of the tournament on the Grand Prix circuit and was held from August 18 through August 24, 1975. Second-seeded Ilie Năstase won the singles title. The final was delayed for two days due to rain.

== Finals ==
=== Singles ===
(Romania) Ilie Năstase defeated (South Africa) Bob Hewitt 7–6, 6–1

- It was Năstase's 4th singles title of the year and the 50th of his career.

=== Doubles ===
(United States) Jimmy Connors / (Romania) Ilie Năstase defeated (Australia) Dick Crealy / (United Kingdom) John Lloyd 7–6, 7–5
