= Allan Marquand =

American art historian and curator (1853–1924)

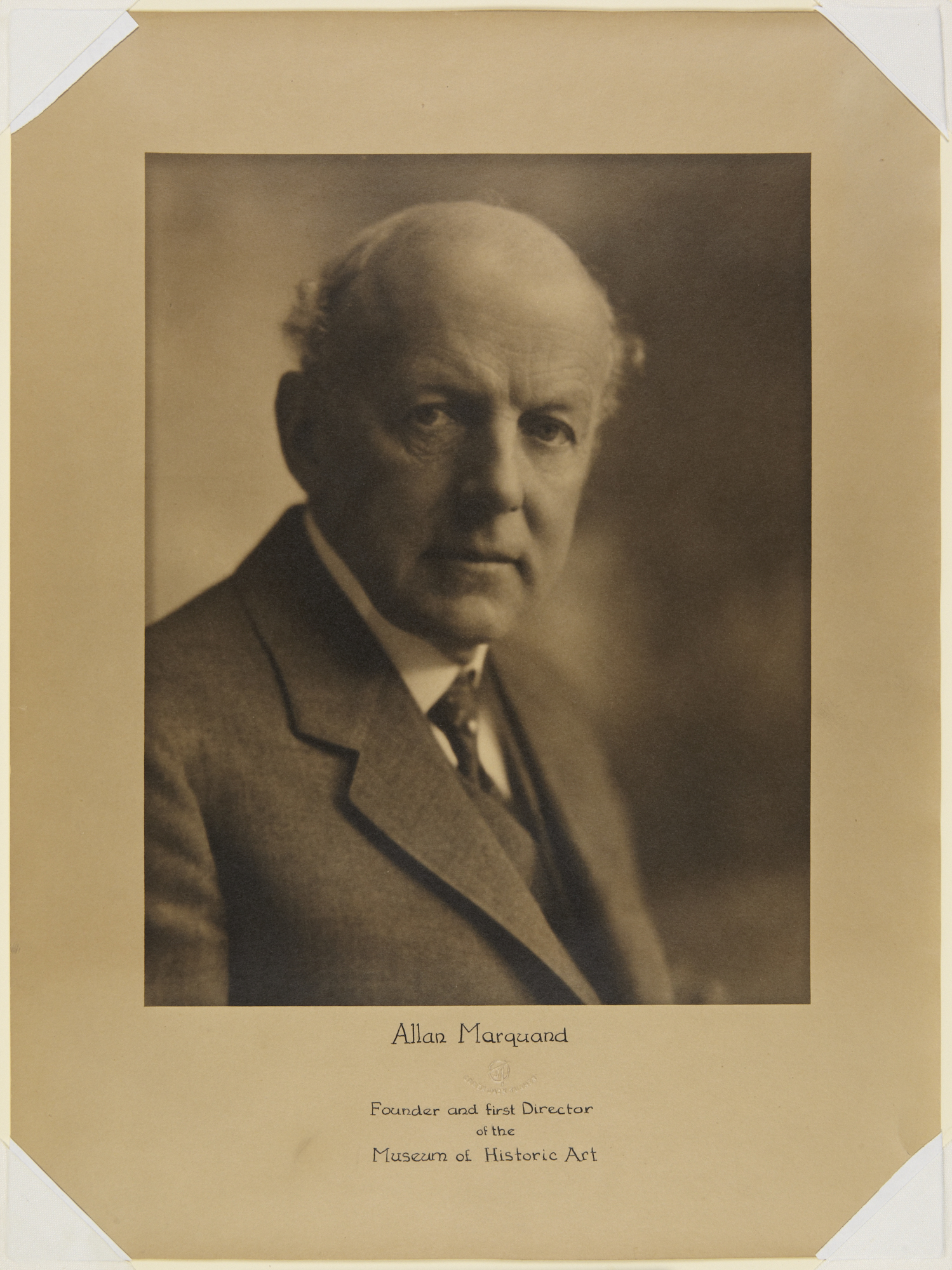
- Born: December 10, 1853; New York City, New York, U.S.
- Died: September 24, 1924 (aged 70); New York City, New York, U.S.
- Education: St. Paul's School (New Hampshire); Princeton University; Johns Hopkins University
- Occupation: Art historian
- Known for: Curator of the Princeton University Art Museum
- Spouse: Eleanor Cross (m. 1896)
- Children: 4
- Parent(s): Henry Gurdon Marquand; Elizabeth Allen Marquand
- Relatives: Harold K. Hochschild (son-in-law); Adam Hochschild (grandson)

Allan Marquand (/ˈmɑːrkwənd/; December 10, 1853 – September 24, 1924) was an art historian at Princeton University and a curator of the Princeton University Art Museum. Marquand is notable as one of the foremost art historians and critics of his time, and helped to popularize and establish the field in elite college campuses. Along with his contemporary, Harvard's Charles Eliot Norton, Marquand was the first academic to bring the serious, academic study of art history into American collegiate curricula.

== Early life ==
Marquand was born on December 10, 1853, in New York City. He was a son of Elizabeth Love (née Allen) Marquand (1826–1895) and Henry Gurdon Marquand, a prominent philanthropist and art collector who served as the second president of the Metropolitan Museum of Art. The Marquand Family gained prominence in the silver trade, having established Marquand and Co. Marquand's uncle, Frederick Marquand, as well as cousin Virginia Marquand Monroe, founded Southport's Pequot Library Association.

After graduating from Princeton in 1874, Allan studied theology for three years at Princeton Seminary and the Union Theological Seminary, later travelling to study at the University of Berlin. He went on to be a Fellow in Philosophy and Ethics and obtain his Ph.D. in Philosophy at the Johns Hopkins University in 1880. His thesis, supervised by Charles Sanders Peirce, was on the logic of Philodemus. While there, he worked on the history of logic, and the design and function of logical machines.

== Career ==
After obtaining his Ph.D., he returned to Princeton in 1881 to teach Latin and logic.

During the 1881–1882 academic year, Marquand built a mechanical logical machine that is still extant; he was inspired by the "Logical Piano" of William S. Jevons in the UK. In 1887, following a suggestion of Peirce's, he outlined a machine to do logic using electric circuits. This necessitated his development of Marquand diagrams. This machine is preserved at Princeton's Firestone Library.

James McCosh, the President of Princeton, deemed Marquand's relatively mathematical approach to teaching logic "unorthodox and uncalvinistic," an approach he had learned at Peirce's feet. Hence in 1883, Marquand was offered a position as the first professor of art history, a position he held until his death and at which he excelled. Marquand is notable as the founder of Princeton's Department of Art and Archaeology. He was elected chairman of the Department of Art and Archaeology in 1905. He also served as the first director of the Princeton University Art Museum, a position he held until his 1922 retirement.

Marquand provided the museum and art history department with books, papers, and art, paying for all other departmental expenses out of his own pocket. Forty year after he founded the department, the enrollment in the Art History department at Princeton had grown from an initial few students with one instructor to a full-time faculty of thirteen who had served over eight hundred students.

Allan is largely seen as the foremost authority on the fifteenth and sixteenth Della Robbia family of sculptors, a passion that developed from a Della Robbia altarpiece donated to the Metropolitan Museum of Art by his father. He published an academic study of this specific altarpiece in the American Journal of Archaeology in 1891. His first volume of critical writing on the Della Robbia was the inaugural installment of the Princeton Monographs, appearing in 1912.

== Personal life ==
On June 18, 1896, he married Eleanor Cross in the Church of the Holy Communion in South Orange, New Jersey. Eleanor, a daughter of English born railroad official and banker Richard James Cross and Matilda (née Redmond) Cross, was a niece of Goold H. Redmond and Frances Redmond Livingston. Her brothers, John Walter and Eliot Buchanan Cross, were prominent architects. Marquand and his family lived in the western section of Princeton, purchasing an estate he renamed "Guernsey Hall" after his family's ancestral home. Together, Eleanor and Allan were the parents of four children:

- Eleanor Marquand (1897–1988), who married George Howard Forsyth Jr., a Guggenheim Fellow, in 1927. They divorced and in 1948 she married widower Douglas Delanoy, a member of the research staff of Merrill Lynch, Pierce, Fenner & Beane.
- Mary Marquand (1900–1974), who married industrialist Harold K. Hochschild, the president of the American Metal Company in 1941.
- Sarnia Marquand (1902–1984), who never married.
- Allan Marquand Jr. (1912–1938), who married Gertrude Palmer before his death at age 26 in 1938.

Marquand died at the Presbyterian Hospital in New York on September 24, 1924, and was buried at Princeton Cemetery. His widow, an authority on the representation and symbolism of flowers and trees in art, died in February 1950.

== Publications ==
- McComb, Arthur; Marquand, Allan; Cook, Walter W. S.; Smith, E. Baldwin; Clapp, Frederick Mortimer; Mather, Frank Jewett (1924). Art Studies: Medieval, Renaissance and Modern. Department of Fine Arts, Harvard University; Department of Fine Arts, Princeton University. Princeton University Press.

== See also ==
- Logical machine
