= Francis S. Thayer =

American politician

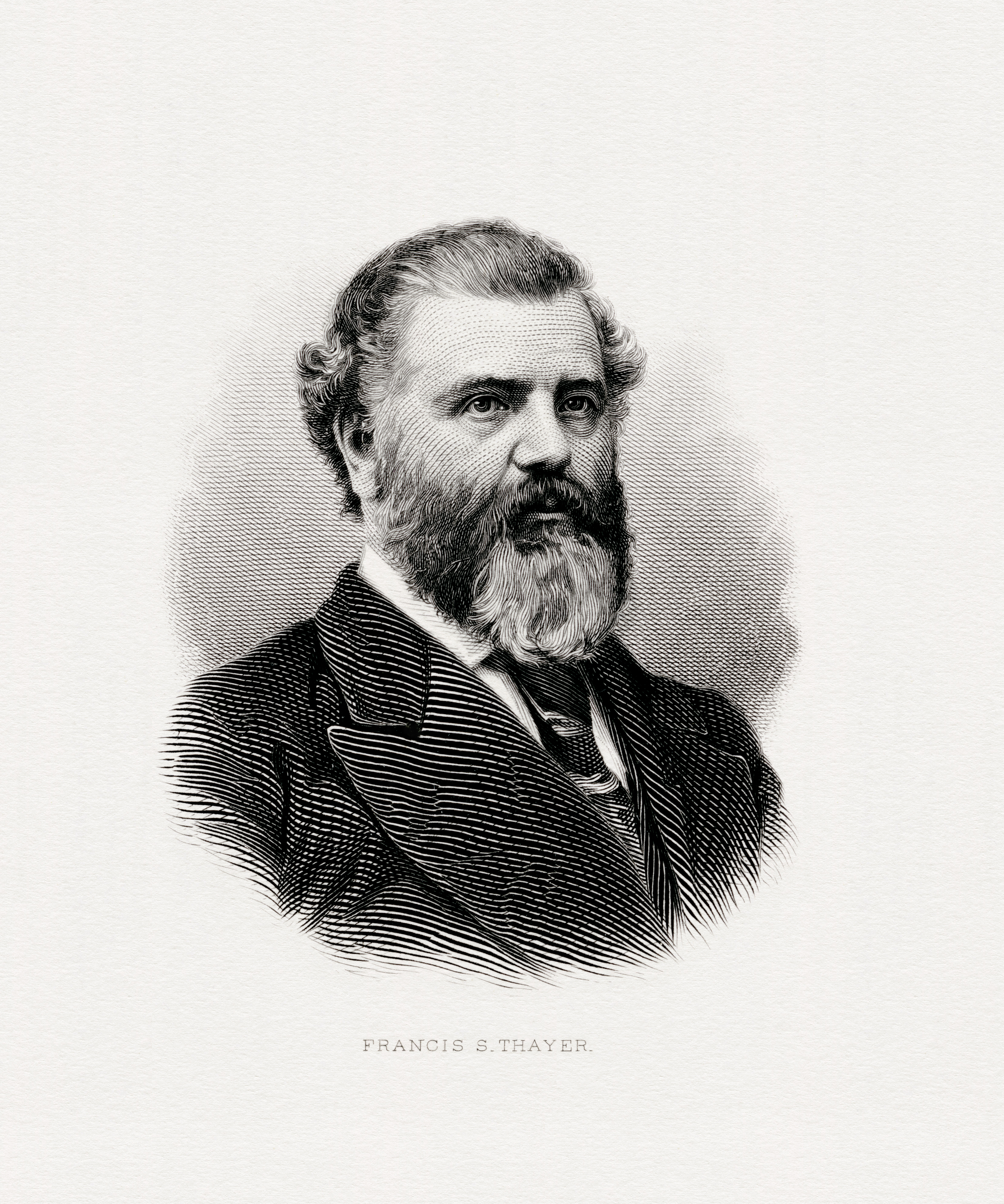
Francis Samuel Thayer

Francis Samuel Thayer (September 11, 1822 in Dummerston, Windham County, Vermont – November 26, 1880 in Colorado Springs, El Paso County, Colorado) was an American merchant and politician from New York.

== Life ==
He was the son of Adin Thayer (1785–1858) and Mary (Ball) Thayer.

He went to Hoosick Falls, New York, in the summer of 1841. Then he attended Cambridge Academy for four months, and during the winter of 1841–42 taught school in North Bennington, Vermont. In the spring of 1842, he removed to Troy, New York, and became a clerk in a flour store. After five years, he was made a partner, and engaged extensively in the flour and milling business.

He was a member of the New York State Senate (12th D.) from 1868 to 1871, sitting in the 91st, 92nd, 93rd and 94th New York State Legislatures. He was the only Republican who voted against the Tweed Charter.

At the New York state election, 1873, he ran on the Republican ticket for Secretary of State of New York, but was defeated by Democrat Diedrich Willers, Jr. Thayer was Auditor of the Canal Department from April 15, 1874, to December 28, 1875, when he was suspended, in connection with the canal investigation. He resigned the office on January 11, 1876.

He went to Colorado Springs, hoping to find relief from his asthma, and died there. He was buried at Oakwood Cemetery in Troy.

Canal Commissioner Adin Thayer (1816–1890) was his brother.

== Succession ==
New York State Senate
Preceded by James Gibson	New York State Senate; 12th District; 1868–1871	Succeeded by Isaac V. Baker Jr.

== Sources ==
- The New York Civil List compiled by Franklin Benjamin Hough, Stephen C. Hutchins and Edgar Albert Werner (1870; pg. 444)
- Life Sketches of the State Officers, Senators, and Members of the Assembly of the State of New York in 1868 by S. R. Harlow & S. C. Hutchins (pg. 143ff)
- THE CANAL INVESTIGATION; SUSPENSION OF AUDITOR THAYER in nYT on December 29, 1875
- EX-AUDITOR THAYER in NYT on January 11, 1876
- OBITUARY; THE HON. FRANCIS S. THAYER in NYT on November 27, 1880
