= Thomas Raines =

American lawyer (1842–1924)

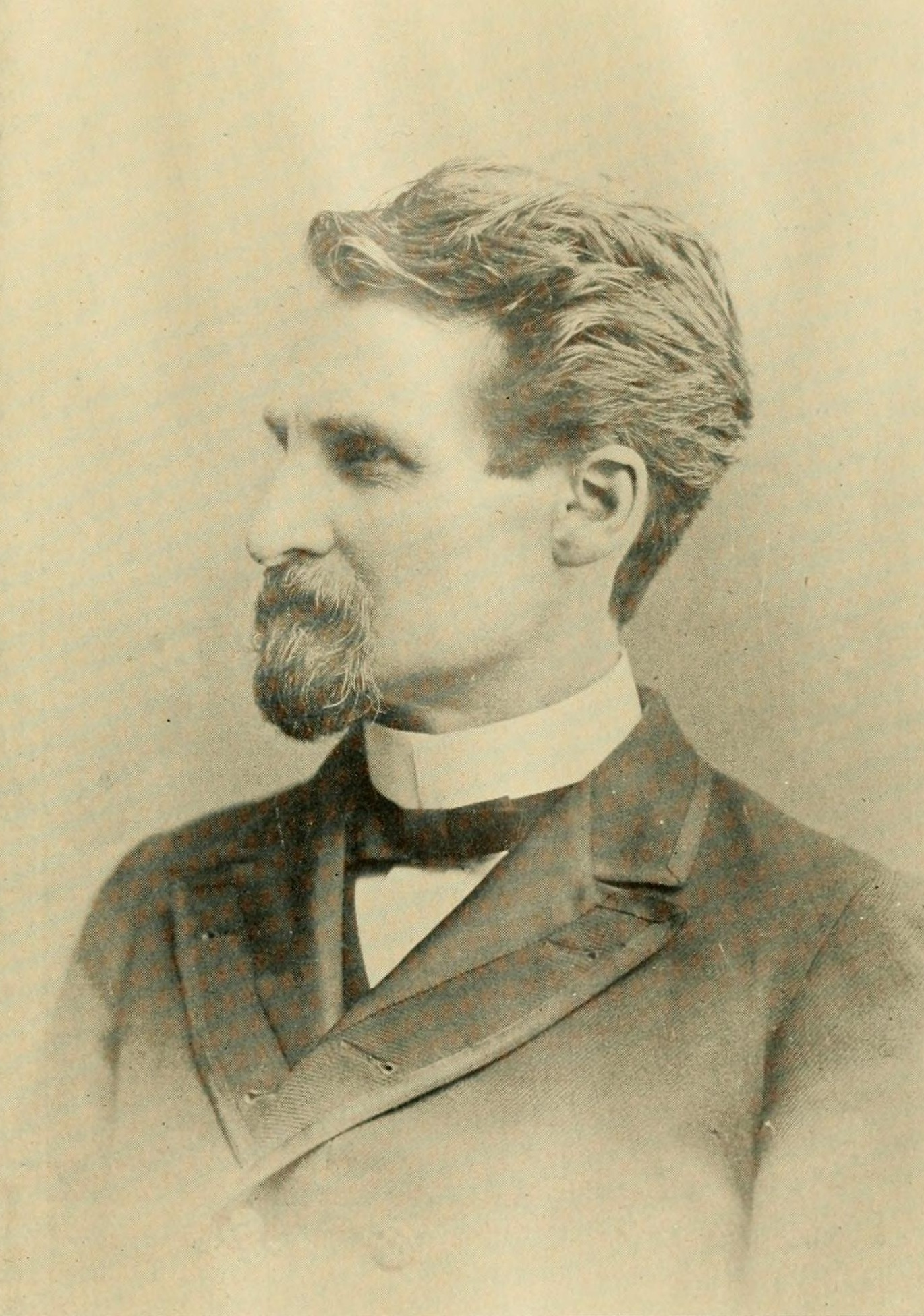
- Born: August 13, 1842; Canandaigua, New York, U.S.
- Died: August 12, 1924 (aged 81); Rochester, New York, U.S.
- Resting place: Mount Hope Cemetery; Rochester, New York, U.S.
- Title: New York State Treasurer
- Term: 1872–1875
- Political party: Republican and Democrat
- Parent(s): Rev. John Raines (1818–1877); Mary Raines (1815–1889)
- Relatives: John Raines (1840–1909); George Raines (1846–1908)

Thomas Raines (August 13, 1842 – August 12, 1924) was an American lawyer and politician.

== Life ==
He was born on August 13, 1842, in Canandaigua, Ontario County, New York, the son of Rev. John Raines (1818–1877) and Mary (Remington) Raines (1815–1889). He was educated in Canandaigua and began his career as a store clerk in Lyons. At age 21, he became active in finance as one of the organizers of a new bank in Geneva. In 1867, he settled in Rochester and became Cashier of the "Farmers' and Mechanics' National Bank."

He was New York State Treasurer from 1872 to 1875. He was elected at the New York state election, 1871 on the Republican ticket, became a Liberal Republican in 1872, and was re-elected at the New York state election, 1873 on the Democratic ticket.

In May 1874, he suffered a nervous breakdown. He was described in contemporary news accounts as a "raving lunatic", being "stark mad", and suffering from "religious frenzy". He was declared incapacitated, and sent to the Utica State Asylum for treatment. On June 1, 1874, Abraham Lansing was appointed by Governor John Adams Dix as Acting Treasurer, pending Raines's recovery or a decision by the State Legislature which would convene only next January. After recovering his mental health, Raines was reinstated to the Treasury by Governor Dix on August 19, 1874.

Afterwards Raines studied law, was admitted to the bar in 1879, and practiced law in Rochester. In 1883, he was appointed as a special county judge of Monroe County. In 1911, he was President of the Monroe County Bar Association.

Raines died on August 12, 1924, in Rochester, New York; and was buried at the Mount Hope Cemetery there.

Congressman John Raines (1840–1909) and State Senator George Raines (1846–1908) were his brothers.

== Works ==
- Raines, Thomas; et al. (1895). Landmarks of Monroe County, New York. Boston: The Boston History Company.

== Sources ==
Political offices
Preceded by Wheeler H. Bristol	New York State Treasurer; 1872–1874	Succeeded by Abraham Lansing; Acting
Preceded by Abraham Lansing; Acting	New York State Treasurer; 1874–1875	Succeeded by Charles N. Ross
