= Nelson K. Hopkins =

American politician (1816–1904)

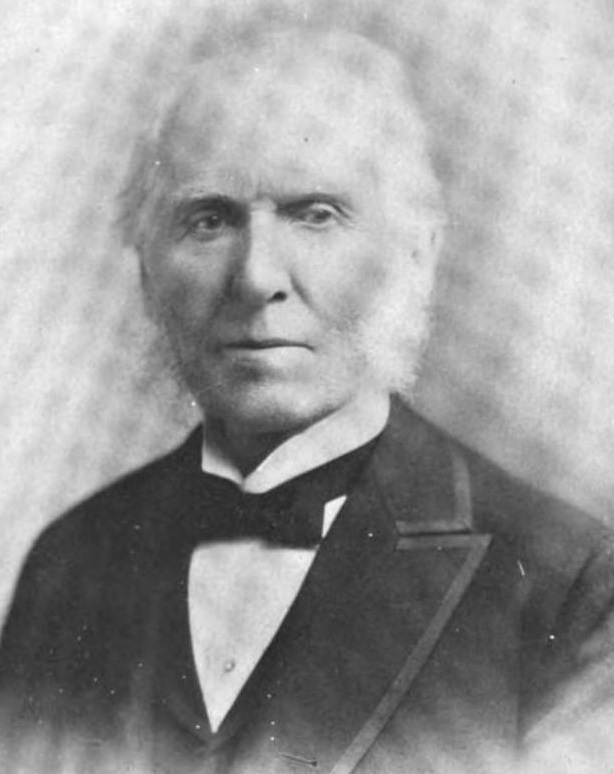
- From Volume VII (1904) of Publications of the Buffalo Historical Society

Comptroller of New York
- In office January 1, 1872 – December 31, 1875
- Preceded by: Asher P. Nichols
- Succeeded by: Lucius Robinson

Personal details
- Born: Nelson Kerr Hopkins; March 2, 1816 Williamsville, New York, U.S.
- Party: Republican
- Spouse: Louise A. Pratt
- Education: Union College
- Occupation: Politician, lawyer

Nelson Kerr Hopkins (March 2, 1816 in Williamsville, Erie County, New York – March 2, 1904) was an American lawyer and politician.

== Life ==
Hopkins was the son of General Timothy Soveral Hopkins (b. ca. 1777) and Nancy Ann (Kerr) Hopkins (d. 1848). Hopkins attended Fredonia Academy and Genesee Wesleyan Seminary in preparation for college.

He graduated from Union College in 1841, with Phi Beta Kappa honors and became a member of the Kappa Alpha Society there. He married Louise A. Pratt.

In 1865, Hopkins was President of the Common Council of Buffalo, New York, having been an alderman since 1856. In 1867, he became Collector of Internal Revenue for the 30th District of New York.

Hopkins was New York State Comptroller from 1872 to 1875, elected in 1871 and 1873 on the Republican ticket.

== Sources ==
- Political Graveyard
- New Political Graveyard
- Rep. state ticket in NYT on October 31, 1871
- Buffalo history

Political offices
Preceded by Asher P. Nichols	New York State Comptroller; 1872–1875	Succeeded by Lucius Robinson
