= James Jackson Jr. (New York politician) =

American politician (c.1826–1891)

James Jackson Jr. (ca. 1826 - March 7, 1891 New York City) was an American businessman and politician from New York.

== Life ==
He was a member of the New York State Assembly (Niagara Co., 1st D.) in 1864.

In 1865, he was Chief Engineer of the Lockport Fire Department, and in 1866, he was one of the first directors of the Niagara Ship Canal Company which was incorporated by an Act of the New York State Legislature.

He served as Mayor of Lockport, New York from 1867 to 1868, when he was nominated in the 29th District for U.S. Congress, but was defeated by Republican John Fisher.

In 1873, he was elected a Canal Commissioner on the Democratic ticket, and was in office from 1874 to 1876.

In 1886, he ran again for Congress, this time in the 33rd District, but was defeated again, this time by the Republican incumbent John B. Weber.

He died of apoplexy while staying at a hotel in New York City.

== Sources ==
- History of Lockport, New York - from Landmarks of Niagara County, New York edited by William Pool (D. Mason & Co, Syracuse NY, 1897)
- Laws of the State of New York (1866)
- Nominations for Congress in NYT on September 29, 1868
- THE CONGRESSIONAL CANVASS in NYT on October 13, 1886

New York State Assembly
Preceded by Benjamin H. Fletcher	New York State Assembly; Niagara County, 1st District; 1864	Succeeded by Albert H. Pickard
