= Frederick Mortimer Clapp =

American art historian

- Born: July 26, 1879; New York City, New York, US
- Died: December 15, 1969 (aged 90); New York City, New York, US
- Other name: Tim Clapp
- Education: City College of New York, Yale University, University of Paris, Sorbonne
- Spouse: Maud Caroline Ede

Frederick Mortimer Clapp (July 26, 1879 – December 15, 1969) was the first Director of the Frick Collection in Manhattan, New York as well as a poet, and art historian. Clapp was the organizing Director at the Frick Collection from 1931 to 1935 and the first Director from 1935 to 1950.

== Biography ==
Frederick M. Clapp attended the City College of New York in 1896–1898, and received his B. A. and M.A. from and Yale University in 1899–1902, and at the University of Paris (Docteur ès lettres, 1914).

He taught at City College of New York. Frank also worked at Princeton University. He married Maud Caroline Ede (Clapp) (1876–1960), an artist from Florence. In 1909, Frederick began studying at the Sorbonne to receive his PhD, and began publishing poetry in 1916.

Frederick Mortimer Clapp joined the Aviation section of the U.S. Army, prior to the creation of the air force, and was a First Lieutenant in the Signal Corps and pilot in World War I. When he returned from war, Clapp published art historical writings, often in the Princeton Journal, "Art Studies."

In 1926, Clapp became chair of the History of Art and Architecture Department at the University of Pittsburgh. There, he developed the school's art library and photography collection, which became known as the Frick Fine Arts Library and now resides in the Frick Fine Arts Building on the Oakland campus.

He was named adviser to the Frick Collection in 1931, and oversaw the development of the Frick residence into a museum in 1933, hiring the architect, John Russell Pope, and opening the museum in 1935. Frederick Mortimer Clapp was officially named director of the Frick Collection in 1936.

Frederick Mortimer Clapp was an advocate of Art History and Fine Arts University programs and spoke on the matter in public addresses.

"Art is difficult and intricate– a beneficent strain upon the memory and so fascinating in its delicate adjustments that it triumphs over our utmost subtlety. These are all reasons why art demands severest study."

— Frederick Mortimer Clapp, What Can A Department of the History Of Art Amount To?, 1929.

He retired in 1951. He died at a New York City Hospital at age ninety, on December 15, 1969.

== Bibliography ==
- Clapp, Frederick Mortimer (1916). On the Overland and Other Poems. New York City, New York: Yale University Press.
- Clapp, Frederick Mortimer (1918). New York and Other Verses. Boston, Massachusetts: Marshall Jones Company.
- McComb, Arthur; Marquand, Allan; Cook, Walter W. S.; Smith, E. Baldwin; Clapp, Frederick Mortimer; Mather, Frank Jewett (1924). Art Studies: Medieval, Renaissance and Modern. Department of Fine Arts, Harvard University; Department of Fine Arts, Princeton University. Princeton University Press.
- 1926. "Cuneiform". Poetry. 28 (5): 262.
- 1926. "Domus Domini". Poetry. 28 (5): 263-264.
- 1926. "Harvesting Ice". Poetry. 28 (5): 264-265.
- 1925. Arhats in art. Princeton, N.J.: Princeton University Press.
- 1926. "Awake Too Soon". Poetry. 28 (5): 265.
- 1929. What can a department of the history of art amount to? Paper given at the 33rd meeting at the Educational Clinic held in Pittsburgh.
- 1936. New poems. New York: Harper & Brothers.
- 1938. Said before sunset. New York: Harper & Brothers.
- 1943. Against a background on fire, 1938–1943. New York: Harper & Brothers.
- 1947. The seeming real, 1943–1946. New York: Harper & Brothers.
- 1972. Jacopo Carucci da Pontormo his life and work. New York: Junius Press.
