= 1974 Medi-Quik Open =

- Date: August 19–26
- Edition: 5th
- Category: Grand Prix (Group B)
- Draw: 32S / 16D
- Prize money: $50,000
- Surface: Grass / outdoor
- Location: South Orange, U.S.
- Venue: Orange Lawn Tennis Club

Champions

Singles
- (Soviet Union) Alex Metreveli

Doubles
- (United States) Brian Gottfried / (Mexico) Raúl Ramírez
- South Orange Open

The 1974 Medi-Quik Open, also known as the Eastern Lawn Tennis Open, was a men's tennis tournament played on outdoor grass courts at the Orange Lawn Tennis Club in South Orange, New Jersey in the United States. It was classified as a Group B category tournament and was part of the 1974 Grand Prix circuit. It was the fifth edition of the tournament on the Grand Prix circuit and was held from August 19 through August 25, 1974. Second-seeded Alex Metreveli won the singles title.

== Finals ==
=== Singles ===
(Soviet Union) Alex Metreveli defeated (United States) Jimmy Connors walkover

- It was Metreveli's only singles title of the year and the 9th and last of his career.

=== Doubles ===
(United States) Brian Gottfried / (Mexico) Raúl Ramírez defeated (India) Anand Amritraj / (India) Vijay Amritraj 7–6, 6–7, 7–6
