= Charles N. Ross =

American banker and politician

Charles Nelson Ross (December 25, 1842 – November 24, 1923) was an American banker and politician.

== Biography ==
Ross was born in Port Byron, New York, the son of Elmore Preston Ross (1809–1879), one of the wealthiest men of Cayuga County, New York, and Caroline Akin Ross (1812–1895).

Ross graduated from Yale College in 1862, and shortly afterwards became Cashier of the First National Bank of Auburn, New York, in which his father owned a controlling interest. Upon the merger of the Auburn City Bank and the First National, he became President of the new bank.

In 1874, he was elected Mayor of Auburn. He was New York State Treasurer from 1876 to 1877. He was a delegate to the 1876 Democratic National Convention.

He "disappeared" early in 1880, and rumors spread he had absconded because of impending bankruptcy.

Political offices
Preceded by Thomas Raines	New York State Treasurer; 1876–1877	Succeeded by James Mackin
