= Frank Jewett Mather =

American art critic and educator

Frank Jewett Mather Jr. (6 July 1868 – 11 November 1953) was an American art critic and professor. He was the first "modernist" (i.e., post-classicist) professor at the Department of Art and Archaeology, Princeton University. He was a direct descendant of Richard Mather a Puritan minister in 17th century Boston.

== Biography ==
He was born in Deep River, Connecticut, to parents Caroline Arms Graves and lawyer Frank Jewett Mather, Sr. (1835–1929). Mather graduated from Williams College in 1889 and from Johns Hopkins with a Ph. D. in 1892 in English philology and literature. Additionally he studied also at Berlin and at the Ecole des Hautes Etudes, Paris.

From 1893 to 1900 he served as instructor and assistant professor of English and Romance languages at Williams College. In 1910, he became professor of art and archaeology at Princeton. From 1922 to 1946 he was the director of Princeton University's art museum.

Mather was elected to the American Academy of Arts and Sciences in 1931 and the American Philosophical Society in 1940.

Mather was an editorial writer for the New York Evening Post and assistant editor of The Nation (1901–1906) and art critic for the Post (1905–1906; 1910–1911); from 1904 to 1906 was American editor of The Burlington Magazine; contributed frequently, chiefly on art subjects, to The Nation, The Burlington Magazine, Art and Progress, and other periodicals. He became editor of Art Studies in 1923.

== Publications ==
- Mather, Frank Jewett (1892). The Conditional Sentence in Anglo-Saxon (dissertation). Johns Hopkins University.
- Mather, Frank Jewett (1912). Homer Martin, Poet in Landscape.
- McComb, Arthur; Marquand, Allan; Cook, Walter W. S.; Smith, E. Baldwin; Clapp, Frederick Mortimer; Mather, Frank Jewett (1924). Art Studies: Medieval, Renaissance and Modern. Department of Fine Arts, Harvard University; Department of Fine Arts, Princeton University. Princeton University Press.
- The Collectors (1912), a volume of short stories
- Estimates in Art (1916)
- The Portraits of Dante (1921)
- A History of Italian Painting (1923)
- Modern Painting: 1664–1914 (1927)
- Western European Painting of the Renaissance (1939)

== Frank Jewett Mather Award ==
Since 1963, the College Art Association (CAA) has presented an annual award for art journalism named in Mather's honor. The award is for "significant published art criticism that has appeared in publication in a one-year period".
