= Abraham Lansing =

American politician

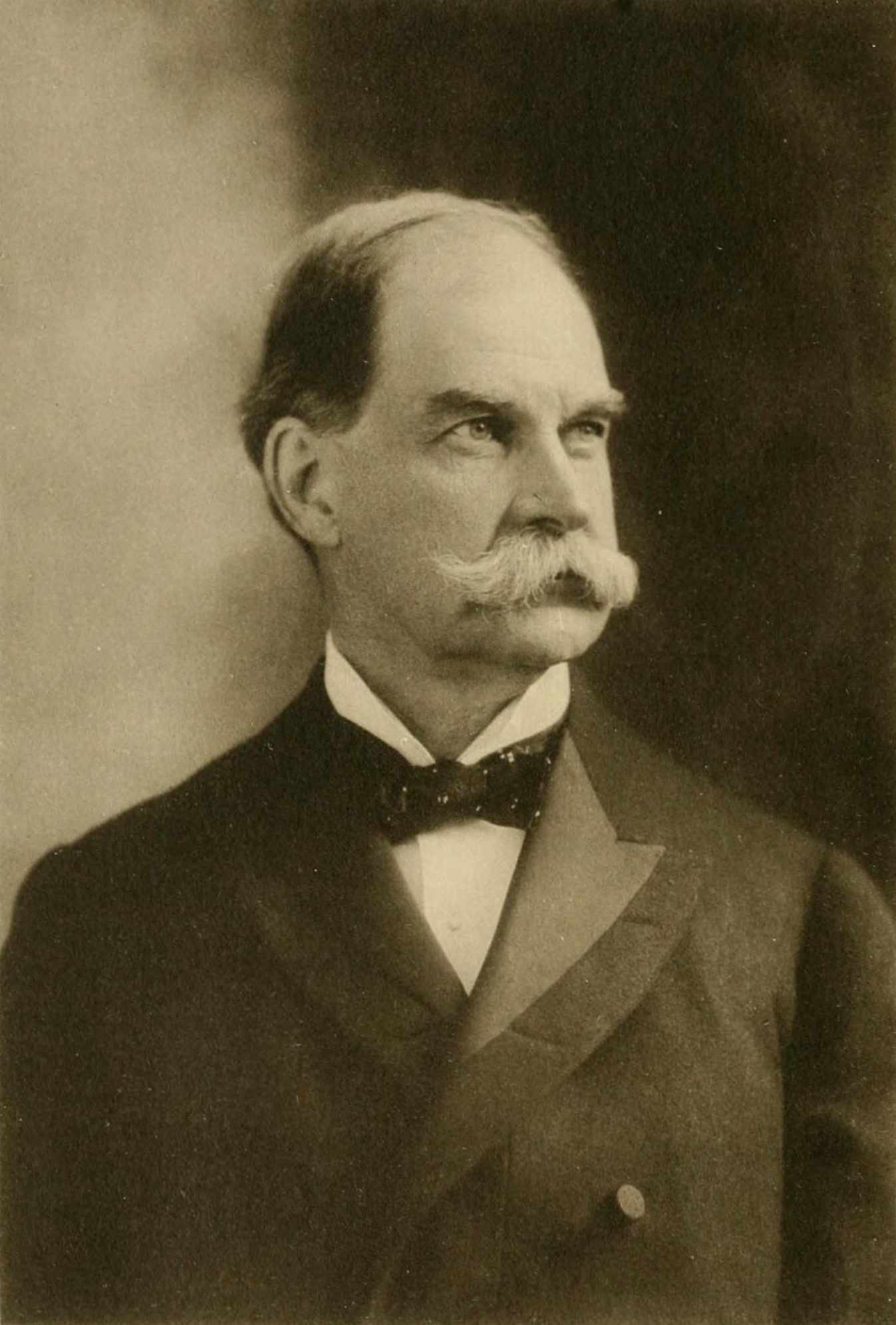

Member of the New York State Senate from the 17th district
- In office January 1, 1882 – December 31, 1883
- Preceded by: Waters W. Braman
- Succeeded by: John Boyd Thacher

Acting New York State Treasurer
- In office June 1, 1874 – August 19, 1874
- Governor: John Adams Dix
- Preceded by: Thomas Raines
- Succeeded by: Thomas Raines

Personal details
- Born: February 27, 1835 Albany, New York, U.S.
- Died: October 4, 1899 (aged 64) Albany, New York, U.S.
- Party: Democratic
- Spouse: Catherine Gansevoort (m. 1873)
- Parent(s): Christopher Yates Lansing; Caroline Mary Thomas
- Relatives: Abraham G. Lansing (grandfather); Gerrit Y. Lansing (uncle)
- Education: The Albany Academy
- Alma mater: Williams College (1855); Albany Law School (1857)

Abraham Lansing (February 27, 1835 – October 4, 1899) was an American lawyer and politician.

== Early life ==
Abraham Lansing a.k.a. "Abe" Lansing, was born in Albany, New York. He was the son of Christopher Yates Lansing (1796–1872) and Caroline Mary (née Thomas) Lansing (1805–1845). Lansing was a grandson of state Treasurer Abraham G. Lansing, grand-nephew of Chancellor John Lansing Jr., and nephew of Gerrit Y. Lansing.

Lansing attended The Albany Academy, graduated from Williams College with an A.B. in 1855, and was a member of Kappa Alpha Society. He read law with his father, graduated from Albany Law School in 1857, and later practiced law in partnership with his brother William.

== Career ==
In 1868, he was appointed City Attorney of Albany, and in 1869 became the first New York Supreme Court reporter. He published the first seven volumes of the Supreme Court Reports.

From June 1, 1874, he was Acting New York State Treasurer, appointed by Governor John Adams Dix while Treasurer Thomas Raines was incapacitated due to a nervous breakdown. Treasurer Raines was treated at the Utica State Asylum. Raines resumed his duties on August 19, 1874.

In 1876, Attorney, "Abe" Lansing was chosen Corporation Counsel of Albany. Elected as a Democrat, he was a member of the New York State Senate (17th D.) in 1882 and 1883. There he worked for the establishment of the State Railroad Commission and the Niagara Falls State Park.

He was a director of the National Commercial Bank, trustee of the Albany Savings Bank, Park Commissioner of Albany, Governor of the Albany Hospital, trustee of The Albany Academy, the Albany Medical College, the Albany Rural Cemetery, the Dudley Observatory. In 1879 he was an American delegate to the International Conference (London) for the Codification of the Law of Nations.

== Personal life ==
On November 26, 1873, he married Catherine Gansevoort (1838–1918), the daughter of former Brigadier General, Peter Gansevoort (1789–1876), "The Hero of Fort Stanwix" and Mary (née Sanford) Gansevoort (1814–1841). She was a granddaughter of Peter Gansevoort and Nathan Sanford. They did not have any children.

Lansing died in Albany on October 4, 1899, and was buried at the Albany Rural Cemetery at Menands, New York.

Political offices
Preceded by Thomas Raines	New York State Treasurer; Acting; 1874	Succeeded by Thomas Raines
New York State Senate
Preceded by Waters W. Braman	New York State Senate; 17th District; 1882–1883	Succeeded by John Boyd Thacher
