= Mary Cross Lynch =

- Born: 1860; Liverpool
- Died: January 4, 1927, 1922; Glasgow

Mary Cross Lynch (1860 – January 4, 1927) was a Scottish novelist and poet.

Mary Cross was born in 1860 in Liverpool. Her first published poems appeared in 1877 in The Charing Cross Magazine. She lived most of her life in Scotland, first in Edinburgh, then in Glasgow, where she married John Lynch.

Her novel False Witness (1891) is about the tribulations of Amos Garth. Her As Gold in the Furnace (1895) is about Philip Beresford, who tries to escape a troubled family background and becomes an author. She contributed serialized novels and poems to numerous publications, including The People's Friend, The People's Journal, Victoria Magazine, and The Reformer. She wrote a newspaper feature called "Current Comment" under the name M. C. L. that appeared in a number of Catholic publications. Some sources credit her with contributions to Charles Dickens' magazine Household Words, but she does not appear in lists of known contributors.

Mary Cross Lynch died on 4 January 1927 in Glasgow.

== Bibliography ==
- Under Sentence. London: Ward & Downey, 1890.
- False Witness. Edinburgh: Oliphant, Anderson & Ferrier: 1891.
- Poems. Edinburgh: Oliphant, Anderson & Ferrier, 1892.
- As Gold in the Furnace. London: Elliot Stock, 1895.
