= Mary F. Cross =

- Born: April 2, 1843; Glasgow
- Died: July 12, 1902; Borough of Tunbridge Wells
- Occupation: Writer
- Parents: William Cross (father); Anna Chalmers Wood Cross (mother)
- Relatives: Richard James Cross, John Walter Cross

Mary Finlay Wood Cross (April 2, 1843 – July 12, 1902) was a Scottish short story writer. She was the sister-in-law of novelist George Eliot.

Mary F. Cross was born on April 2, 1843 in Glasgow, the daughter of William Cross, a banker, and Anna Chalmers Wood Cross. Her siblings Richard James Cross and John Walter Cross were also bankers. In 1880, John Cross became the second husband of George Eliot, who grew close with her husband's three unmarried sisters, including Mary.

Cross published a single volume, Railway Sketches (1899), a collection of stories that appeared in the magazines Macmillan's ("Docteur Lavardin: A Sketch"), Gentleman's Magazine, Vanity Fair, Black and White, and Hearth and Home.

During the Franco-Prussian War, she and her brother William worked at a soup kitchen during the Battle of Sedan.

Mary F. Cross died on 12 July 1902 in Tunbridge Wells.

== Bibliography ==
- Railway Sketches. 1 vol. London: F. V. White, 1899.
