= Orange Invitation =

Defunct tennis tournament
- Event name: Orange Fall Open (1881-99); Orange Invitation (1920-40)
- Tour: ILTF
- Founded: 1881, 1920
- Abolished: 1899, 1940
- Location: South Orange, New Jersey, US
- Venue: Orange Lawn Tennis Club
- Surface: Grass

The Orange Invitation was a grass court tennis tournament originally founded in 1881 as the Orange Fall Open that ran until 1899. In 1920 the event was revived as an annual invitational tournament through to 1940.

== History ==
In 1880 the Orange Lawn Tennis Club (OLTC) is founded at the intersection of Montrose and Berkeley Avenue in South Orange, New Jersey, where it remained for 36 years. In October 1881 the club staged a new tournament known as the Orange Lawn Tennis Club Open that ran until 1899.

Prior to 1920 Orange Lawn Tennis Club had been host to the Middle States Championships which was moved to Philadelphia. That tournament was then replaced by the Annual Invitational Tournament until 1940.

Previous winners of the men's singles title included; Richard Field Conover, Howard Augustus Taylor, Vinnie Richards, Bill Tilden, Manuel Alonso Areizaga, Masanosuke Fukuda and Sidney Wood.

== See also ==
- Orange Spring Open
