= Goold H. Redmond =

American sportsmen and prominent member of society

- Born: Goold Hoyt Redmond; April 30, 1838; New York City, New York, U.S.
- Died: December 21, 1906 (aged 68); New York City, New York, U.S.
- Education: Columbia College
- Known for: Frances Redmond (sister); Annie Redmond (sister); Eleanor Cross Marquand (niece); John Walter Cross (nephew); Eliot Cross (nephew)
- Parent(s): William Redmond; Sabina Hoyt Redmond
- Relatives: Jesse Hoyt

Goold Hoyt Redmond (April 30, 1838 – December 21, 1906) was an American sportsmen and prominent member of society during the Gilded Age.

== Early life ==
Redmond was born in New York City on April 30, 1838. He was the son of William Redmond (1804–1874) and Sabina Elizabeth (née Hoyt) Redmond (1811–1870). Among his siblings were William Redmond, Sabina Redmond Wood, Matilda Redmond (the wife of banker Richard James Cross and mother of architects John Walter Cross and Eliot Cross), Henry Redmond, Annie Redmond (who married R.J. Cross after her sister Martilda's death), Mary Redmond, Emily Redmond (who cared for the Cross children), and Frances Redmond Livingston (the wife of Henry Beekman Livingston). His father, a prominent merchant with Wm. Redmond & Son, was born in Ballymena, County Antrim in Northern Ireland and then moved to Charleston, South Carolina before settling in New York City. He was one of the founders of the Union Club.

His maternal grandparents were Sabina (née Sheaff) Hoyt and Goold Hoyt, a merchant with Hoyt & Tom who was involved with the East India and China trade and was one of the founders of the Merchants' Exchange National Bank. Redmond was a grand-nephew of Jesse Hoyt, a Collector of the Port of New York who was known for his role in the Swartwout-Hoyt scandal, and Lydig Monson Hoyt, who married Blanche Geraldine Livingston of the Livingston family.

== Career ==
Redmond graduated from Columbia College in 1857, along with classmates Samuel Ward Francis, Elbridge Thomas Gerry, and Daniel S. Tuttle.

He worked in banking and fire insurance, serving as a Trustee to the London Assurance Corporation's indenture in 1871. Redmond also managed real estate in New York City.

=== Society life ===
In 1892, Redmond (along with his sister Frances and her husband Henry) were included in Ward McAllister's "Four Hundred", purported to be an index of New York's best families, published in The New York Times. Conveniently, 400 was the number of people that could fit into Mrs. Astor's ballroom. He was also included in the Ultra-fashionable Peerage of America in 1904. Redmond spent time with his family in Newport, Rhode Island in the summer months. He was a member of the New York Zoological Society the Southside Sportsmen's Club of Long Island, and the Tuxedo Club in Tuxedo Park, New York. He was painted by Jacob H. Lazarus.

== Personal life ==
Redmond, who did not marry, was known as "the greatest beau of New York." Along with Lispenard Stewart and James Parker, Redmond was known for entertaining in "bachelor fashion."

He died at his residence, 6 North Washington Square, on December 21, 1906. After a funeral that was held at Grace Church in Manhattan at 10 o'clock on Christmas Eve, he was buried at Green-Wood Cemetery in Brooklyn.
