= Diedrich Willers Jr. =

American politician

Diedrich Willers Jr. (November 3, 1833 – June 25, 1908) was a Democratic politician from Varick, New York who served as Secretary of State of New York. Born to a working class German immigrant family, his political fortune was a notable example of the effect of civil service reform.

== Early life ==
Born in rural Varick, New York, he was the sixth of eight children of Reverend Diedrich Willers D.D. (1798–1883), an immigrant from Bremen, Germany. His father fought in the Hanoverian Army at the Battle of Waterloo in 1815, immigrated to Baltimore, Maryland in 1819, and began preaching to various Seneca County, New York congregations in 1821, and was also notable as a critic of Mormonism. His mother was born in New Holland, Pennsylvania of Pennsylvania Dutch stock.

Willers' early life was one of toil; he divided his time between working on the family farm in the summers and attending district school in the winter. With the exception of two terms at the Seneca Falls Academy, he had no schooling other than district school. He began teaching at the district school at age 16, and at age 22 entered the printing business, but was forced to abandon that pursuit due to ill health.

== Political career ==
He was destined by his father for the ministry, but took an early interest in politics. Having managed to obtain at intervals a law degree from Albany Law School, he was admitted to the bar, but never actively practiced as an attorney. By the age of 21, Willers was a Hard-Shell Democrat, supporting the election of Greene C. Bronson for governor in 1854. He was appointed to a clerkship in New York Secretary of State Gideon J. Tucker's office in 1857, and held this position during the succeeding terms of David R. Floyd-Jones and Horatio Ballard until 1863, when Governor Horatio Seymour appointed him as his personal secretary.

He later returned to farming in Varick, where he was chairman of the board of supervisors in 1865 and 1866. In March 1867, Willers was appointed by President Andrew Johnson as Second Auditor of the Treasury, for which he went to Washington, D.C., but he returned to New York upon the success of the Democrats in the 1867 state elections, resulting in his appointment as Deputy Secretary of State. He was the Democratic candidate for Secretary of State in 1871 despite the objections of nearly all of the older or managing party politicians, but lost the election in a down year for the Democrats. He was again nominated in 1873, and this time won, serving from 1874 to 1875. He was a member of the New York State Assembly (Seneca Co.) in 1878.

He was Deputy Secretary of State under Frederick Cook, retiring at the end of 1889, and there was talk of nominating Willers for Secretary of State again, but he declined due to declining health.

He died in Varick, New York on June 25, 1908.

Political offices
Preceded by G. Hilton Scribner	New York Secretary of State; 1874–1875	Succeeded by John Bigelow
New York State Assembly
Preceded by Albert L. Childs	New York State Assembly; Seneca County; 1878	Succeeded by David H. Evans
