= Wheeler H. Bristol =

American politician

Wheeler Hutchison Bristol
- Born: January 16, 1818; Canaan, Columbia County, New York
- Died: November 21, 1904 (aged 86); DeLand, Volusia County, Florida
- Title: New York State Treasurer
- Term: 1868–1871
- Spouse: Mary Ann Worthington (m. 1848)
- Parent(s): George Bristol; Sally Hutchinson

Wheeler Hutchison Bristol (January 16, 1818 Canaan, Columbia County, New York – November 21, 1904 DeLand, Volusia County, Florida) was an American engineer, railroad executive and politician. He was New York State Treasurer from 1868 to 1871.

== Life ==
He was born on January 16, 1818, in Canaan, Columbia County, New York, to George Bristol and Sally (Hutchinson) Bristol.

He married Mary Ann Worthington on October 5, 1848.

In 1886, his residence on the "Glenmary" estate, which he had bought from Nathaniel Parker Willis who had lived from 1837 to 1842 in another house nearby, at Owego was burgled after he had moved to Florida.

He died on November 21, 1904, in DeLand, Volusia County, Florida.

== Sources ==
- Franklin Benjamin Hough (1858). The New York Civil List. Weed, Parsons and Co. p. 37.
- Dem. State Convention, in NYT on September 2, 1852
- His nomination, in NYT on September 19, 1853

Political offices
Preceded by Joseph Howland	New York State Treasurer; 1868–1871	Succeeded by Thomas Raines
