= Deborah J. Bennett =

American mathematician

Deborah Jo Bennett (born 1950) is an American mathematician, mathematics education scholar, and book author. She is a professor of mathematics at New Jersey City University.

== Education and career ==
Bennett is originally from Tuscaloosa, Alabama; her father was a military officer and her mother worked as a computer systems analyst. She majored in mathematics at the University of Alabama, graduating in 1972, and worked as a researcher at the Institute for Defense Analysis and as an operations researcher for the US Government Accountability Office before returning to graduate school for a master's degree in operations research at George Washington University in 1980.

After a year in Ghana teaching mathematics through the Peace Corps, she became a mathematics instructor at Pace University from 1981 to 1987, and at Farmingdale State College from 1984 to 1993. While doing this, she also completed a Ph.D. in mathematics education at New York University in 1993. Her dissertation, The Development of the Mathematical Concept of Randomness: Educational Implications, was supervised by Kenneth P. Goldberg.

She joined New Jersey City University as an assistant professor of mathematics in 1993, adding a concurrent appointment in education in 1999. She has since become a full professor, and served two terms as president of the University Senate.

== Books ==
Bennett is the coauthor of the textbook Algebra for All (with Phillip Aikey and Julio Guillen, McGraw-Hill, 1997). She is also the author of two popular mathematics books, Randomness (Harvard University Press, 1998), and Logic Made Easy: How to Know When Language Deceives You (W. W. Norton, 2004). Her book Logic Made Easy was listed as an Outstanding Academic Title in 2004 by Choice Reviews.
