= G. Hilton Scribner =

American politician (1831–1910)

Gilbert Hilton Scribner
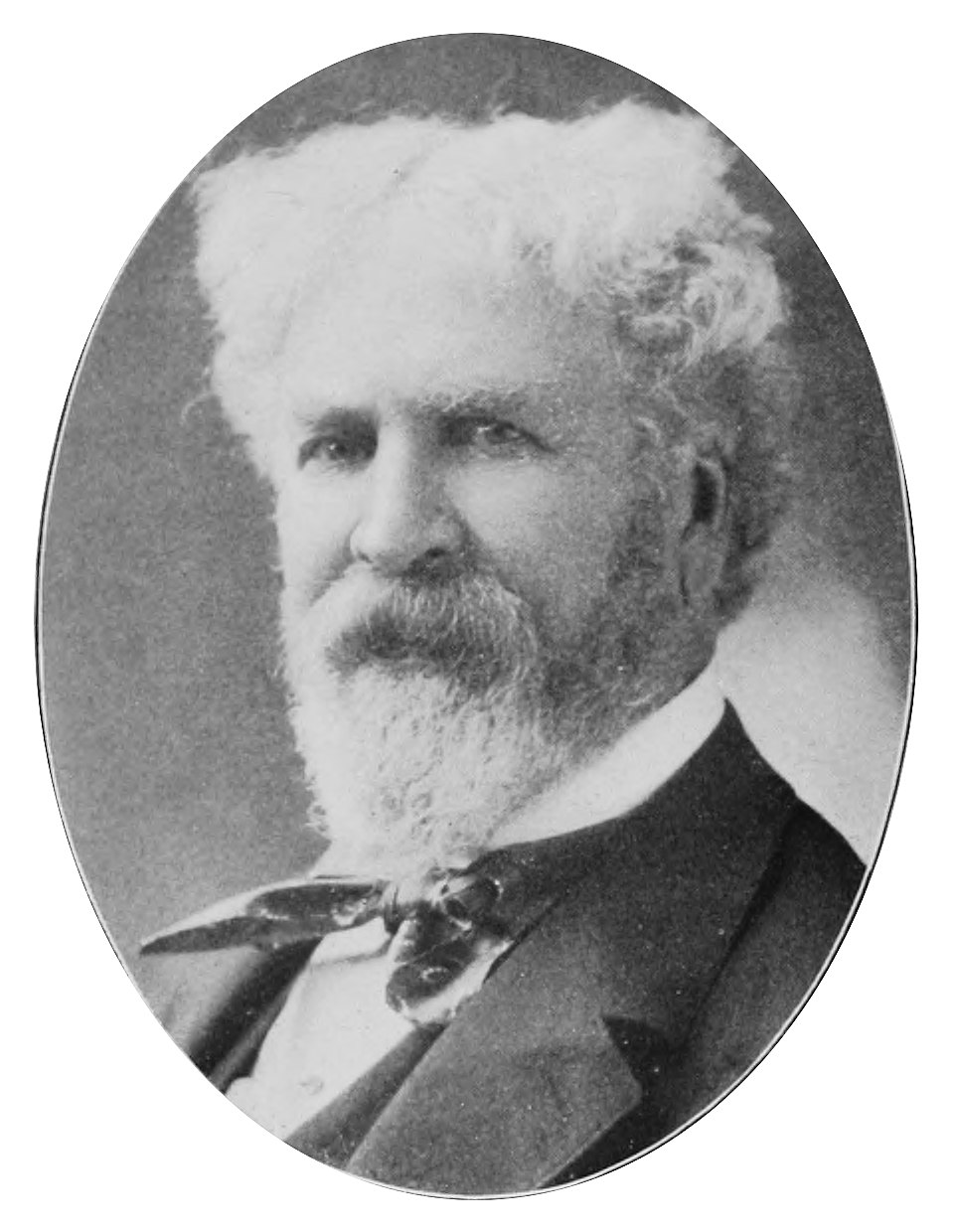

Secretary of State of New York
- In office 1870–1873
- Governor: John T. Hoffman; John Adams Dix
- Preceded by: Homer Augustus Nelson
- Succeeded by: Diedrich Willers, Jr.

Personal details
- Born: April 23, 1831 Monroe County, New York
- Died: January 5, 1910 (aged 78) Yonkers, New York
- Spouse: Sarah Woodbury Pettengill (m. 1856)
- Relatives: Charles Scribner, cousin

Gilbert Hilton Scribner (April 23, 1831 – January 5, 1910) was an American lawyer and politician who was Secretary of State of New York from 1870 to 1873.

== Biography ==
Scribner was born on April 23, 1831, in Monroe County, New York to Sewell B. Scribner.

He was a Republican member of the New York State Assembly (Westchester Co., 1st D.) in 1871. He was president of the Belt Line Street Railroad of New York.

In 1884, Scribner authored an article titled "Where Did Life Begin?" in Popular Science.

He attended Oberlin College, then studied law under Daniel B. Taylor. He was admitted to the bar in 1856.

In 1856 he married Sarah Woodbury Pettengill (born 1835) in Rochester, New York.

He became a member of the New York State Legislature in 1869. In 1870 he became secretary of state of New York, and held that position until 1873.

Scribner died at his residence, "Inglehurst", on Pine Street on January 5, 1910, in Yonkers, New York.

== Family ==
His daughter Sarah Marguerite (b. October 8, 1876) was an artist, poet and storywriter. She married (October 8, 1902) the third son of George Hamilton Frost, Edwin Hunt Frost (b. Chicago August 23, 1874).

New York State Assembly
Preceded by James J. Mooney	New York State Assembly; Westchester County, 1st District; 1871	Succeeded by William W. Niles
Political offices
Preceded by Homer Augustus Nelson	New York Secretary of State; 1872–1873	Succeeded by Diedrich Willers, Jr.
