= Logic Made Easy =

2004 book by Deborah Bennett

Logic Made Easy: How to Know When Language Deceives You
- Author: Deborah J. Bennett
- Language: English
- Genre: Non-fiction
- Publisher: W.W. Norton & Company
- Publication date: 2004
- ISBN: 0-393-05748-8

Logic Made Easy: How to Know When Language Deceives You is a 2004 book by Deborah J. Bennett published by W.W. Norton & Company (ISBN 0-393-05748-8). Its theme is the analysis of what common words such as "some", "all", and "not" mean, and how logic relates to speech and writing. It discusses eliminating problems such as ambiguity and imprecise language from communications, such as in technical writing.
