= Homer Augustus Nelson =

American politician

Member of the U.S. House of Representatives from New York's 12th district
- In office March 4, 1863 – March 3, 1865
- Preceded by: Stephen Baker
- Succeeded by: John Henry Ketcham

New York Secretary of State
- In office January 1, 1868 – December 31, 1871
- Governor: Reuben Fenton; John T. Hoffman
- Preceded by: Francis C. Barlow
- Succeeded by: G. Hilton Scribner

Member of the New York State Senate
- In office January 1, 1882 – December 31, 1883
- Preceded by: Stephen H. Wendover
- Succeeded by: Thomas Newbold

Personal details
- Born: August 31, 1829 Poughkeepsie, New York, US
- Died: April 25, 1891 (aged 61) Poughkeepsie, New York, US
- Resting place: Poughkeepsie Rural Cemetery
- Party: Democratic
- Spouse: Helen Stearns
- Profession: Politician, lawyer

Homer Augustus Nelson (August 31, 1829 – April 25, 1891) was an American politician and soldier from the state of New York. He served one term in the U.S. House of Representative and was an officer in the Union Army during the first part of the Civil War and a United States congressman during the latter half of the war.

== Early life and education ==
Nelson was born in Poughkeepsie, New York, where he was also raised and educated. He studied law and was admitted to the bar, commencing practice in Poughkeepsie.

== Judicial career ==
He was a judge of Dutchess County, New York, from 1855 to 1862.

== Civil War ==
At the outbreak of the Civil War, he became colonel of the 159th New York Volunteer Infantry.

== Political career ==
Nelson left in 1863 when he took his seat in the 38th United States Congress, but was unsuccessful for reelection in 1864. He was one of 14 House Democrats to vote in favor of the Thirteenth Amendment to the United States Constitution.

Following the war, he was a delegate to the New York State Constitutional Convention in 1867 and the same year was elected Secretary of State of New York serving until 1871. He was a member of the New York State Senate (15th D.) in 1882 and 1883; and was appointed to the commission to report a revision of the judiciary article of the New York Constitution in 1890.

== Death and burial ==
He died on April 25, 1891, in Poughkeepsie and was interred in Poughkeepsie Rural Cemetery.

U.S. House of Representatives
Preceded by Stephen Baker	Member of the U.S. House of Representatives from New York's 12th congressional district 1863–1865	Succeeded by John H. Ketcham
Political offices
Preceded by Francis C. Barlow	New York Secretary of State; 1868–1871	Succeeded by G. Hilton Scribner
New York State Senate
Preceded by Stephen H. Wendover	New York State Senate; 15th District; 1882–1883	Succeeded by Thomas Newbold
