= Asher P. Nichols =

American politician

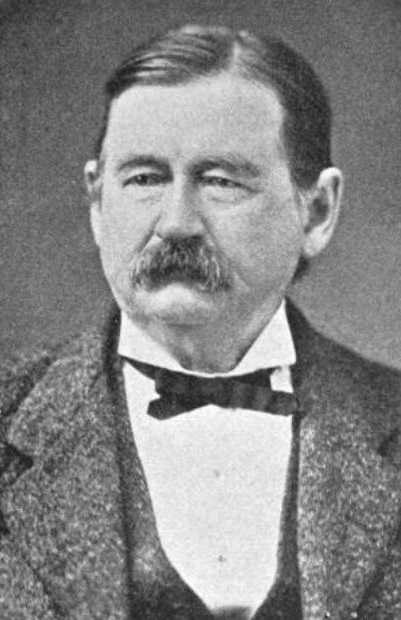
From 1897's A Century in the Comptroller's Office, State of New York, 1797 to 1897

Asher P. Nichols (c. 1815 – May 30, 1880) was an American lawyer and politician.

== Life ==
Nichols was born in Whiting, Vermont. His family moved to Rushville, New York, when he was still at a young age. He graduated from Springville Academy at the age of about 18. He then went to Canandaigua to be a clerk in the law office of Judge George W. Clinton, son of Governor DeWitt Clinton. In 1836, they both went to Buffalo, being among the first lawyers in that city. Nichols completed his legal studies, was admitted to the bar and became Clinton's partner.

Though a staunch Democrat, he was not active in politics until 1867, when he accepted the nomination for state senator and won the election by a large majority. He was a member of the New York State Senate (31st D.) in 1868 and 1869.

He was appointed New York State Comptroller in June 1870 to fill the vacancy caused by the resignation of William F. Allen who had been elected to the New York Court of Appeals. In November 1870, he was elected to succeed himself for the remaining year of Allen's term, but in 1871, he was defeated for re-election by Republican Nelson K. Hopkins.

Nichols died of apoplexy at a friend's home in Clinton, and was buried at Rochester, New York.

New York State Senate
Preceded by David S. Bennett	New York State Senate; 31st District; 1868–1869	Succeeded by Loren L. Lewis
Political offices
Preceded by William F. Allen	New York State Comptroller; 1870–1871	Succeeded by Nelson K. Hopkins
