= Thomas Newbold (New York politician) =

American politician

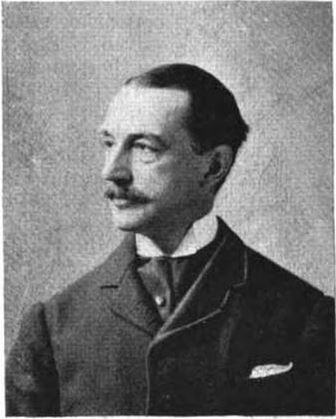

Member of the New York State Senate
- In office January 1, 1884 – December 31, 1885
- Preceded by: Homer A. Nelson
- Succeeded by: Jacob W. Hoysradt

Personal details
- Born: May 19, 1849 New York, U.S.
- Died: November 21, 1929 (aged 80) New York City, U.S.
- Spouse: Sarah Lawrence Coolidge (m. 1880; died 1922)
- Relations: Edith Wharton (cousin)
- Parent(s): Thomas Haines Newbold; Mary Rhinelander Newbold
- Education: Trinity Hall, Cambridge; Columbia Law School

Thomas Newbold (May 19, 1849 – November 11, 1929) was an American lawyer, politician, and society leader during the Gilded Age.

== Early life ==
Newbold was born on May 19, 1849. He was the son of Thomas Haines Newbold (1815–1869) and Mary Elizabeth (née Rhinelander) Newbold (1822–1897). Among his siblings was Catherine Augusta Newbold, Frederick Rhinelander Newbold (who served as president of the American Rose Society), and Edith Newbold.

His paternal grandparents were Philadelphia born Thomas Newbold and Catherine (née LeRoy) Newbold, who died in Paris, France, in 1835. His maternal grandparents were Frederick William Rhinelander and Mary Lucretia Ann (née Stevens) Rhinelander (daughter of Maj. Gen. Ebenezer Stevens). His uncle was Frederic W. Rhinelander, president of the Metropolitan Museum of Art, and his maternal aunt was Lucretia Stevens Rhinelander, the mother of Frederic Rhinelander Jones and Edith Newbold Jones, his first cousin who was a novelist and designer better known as Edith Wharton.

== Career ==
Newbold was educated at schools in Poughkeepsie (including the Fen Stanton Vicarage) and Trinity Hall, University of Cambridge, receiving a B.A. degree in 1871. He then became a lawyer, studying in the office of Sanford, Robinson & Woodruff, eventually graduating from Columbia Law School in 1874.

In 1883, he was elected on an "anti-bribery platform" to serve as a Democratic State Senator in the 107th and 108th New York State Legislatures, representing the 15th District, which included Columbia, Dutchess and Putnam counties. In 1885, he was selected by the Democrats of the 2nd District, Dutchess County, to represent them at the State Convention. While serving in the State Senate, he became close with then Governor of New York, Grover Cleveland, later the president of the United States. After retiring from the Senate, Newbold served as the president of the New York State Department of Health in the 1880s and 1890s, succeeding Erastus Brooks.

=== Society life ===
In 1892, Newbold and his wife Sarah were included in Ward McAllister's "Four Hundred", purported to be an index of New York's best families, published in The New York Times. Conveniently, 400 was the number of people that could fit into Mrs. Astor's ballroom. Newbold was a member of the Knickerbocker Club, the Metropolitan Club, the Racquet and Tennis Club and the Church.

In 1885, the Newbolds acquired property in Hyde Park, New York, known as Bellefield, adjacent to James Roosevelt's Springwood (both of which are now a part of the Franklin D. Roosevelt National Historic Site). In 1912, the Newbolds hired Beatrix Farrand (the daughter of his cousin Frederic Rhinelander Jones and his wife, Mary Cadwalader Rawle Jones) to design a walled residential garden at Bellefield. It is one of the earliest extant examples of Farrand's residential designs, and is one of the only known pairings of works by Farrand and the architects McKim, Mead & White, who remodeled the Newbolds' eighteenth-century house from 1909 to 1911 in the Colonial Revival style.

== Personal life ==
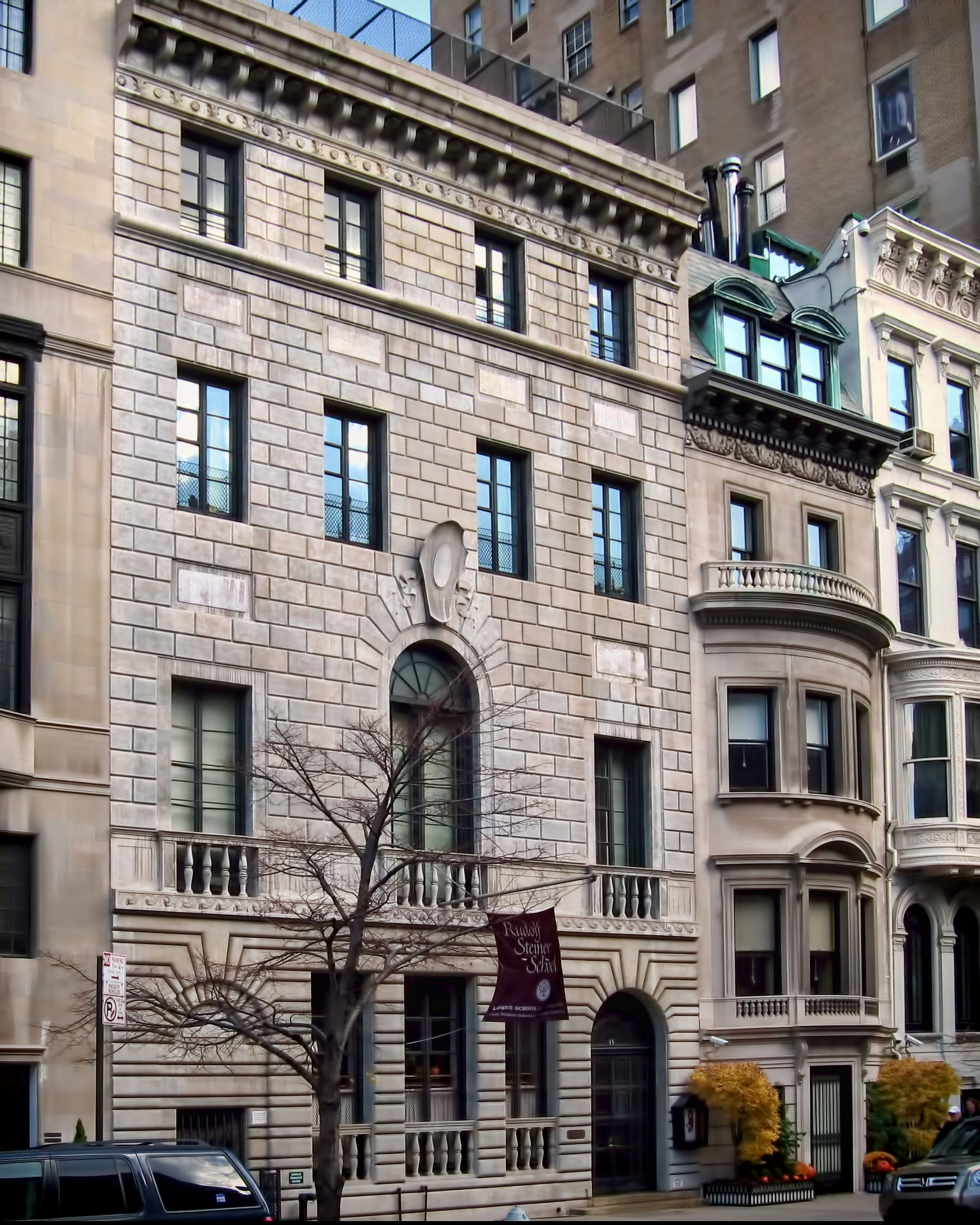
The Newbold's New York City residence, 15 East 79th Street.

On June 2, 1880, Newbold was married to Sarah Lawrence Coolidge (1858–1922), a direct descendant of Thomas Jefferson. She was the daughter of T. Jefferson Coolidge, a Boston Brahmin businessman who served as the U.S. Minister to France under President Harrison, and Mehitable Sullivan "Hetty" (née Appleton) Coolidge. Together, they were the parents of:

- Mary Edith Newbold (1883–1969), who married William Gerald Dare Morgan (1879–1948), a descendant of the Livingston and Hoyt families (through Maturin Livingston), in 1916. Gerald, as he was known, was the brother of Geraldine Morgan Thompson.
- Thomas Jefferson Newbold (1886–1939), who married Katherine Hubbard in 1914.
- Julia Appleton Newbold (1891–1972), who married William Redmond Cross (1874–1940), a governor of the Aero Club of America from 1911 to 1921 and president of the New York Zoological Society, in 1913.

In 1916, he hired McKim, Mead & White to build a new residence for his family at 15 East 79th Street (which today is the Rudolf Steiner School). The architects tore down two identical brownstones and built an Italian Renaissance style palazzo with an arched double-door entrance.

Newbold's wife died at their New York home on December 29, 1922. He died on November 11, 1929, in New York City. He was buried at Green-Wood Cemetery in Brooklyn, New York. After his death, his estate was divided equally among his three children with his eldest daughter Mary inheriting their New York City residence and Bellefield in Hyde Park.

=== Descendants ===
Through his daughter Julia, he was the grandfather of Emily Redmond Cross (c. 1914–2006), who married John Kenyon Vaughan-Morgan, a Member of Parliament for Reigate who was the son of the Sir Kenyon Vaughan-Morgan and the Lady Vaughan-Morgan of London, in March 1940.

New York State Senate
Preceded by Homer A. Nelson	New York State Senate; 15th District; 1884–1885	Succeeded by Jacob W. Hoysradt
