= Orange Spring Open =

Defunct tennis tournament
- Founded: 1882
- Abolished: 1899
- Editions: 8
- Location: South Orange, New Jersey, US
- Surface: Outdoor (grass)

The Orange Spring Open was an early men's open tennis tournament held in South Orange, New Jersey, United States. It was usually staged the second week of June annually from 1882 to 1899. The club also staged an Autumn event called the Orange Fall Open from 1881 to 1899.

== History ==
The Orange Spring Tournament was a brief pre-open era tennis tournament was played on outdoor grass courts in Montrose, South Orange, New Jersey, United States, there were eight editions of this event.

== Finals ==
Incomplete list of tournaments included:

=== Men's singles ===
Year	Champion	Runner up	Score
1882	(United States) Godfrey M. Brinley	(United States) J. F. Bacon	6-0 6-2 6-3
1884	(United States) Richard Field Conover	(United States) Percy Knapp	6-0 5-7 7-5 7-9 6-4
1885	(United States) Robert Livingston Beeckman	(United States) William V.S. Thorne	7-5 6-2 6-3
1886	(United States) Robert Livingston Beeckman	(United Kingdom) William Edward Glyn	6-2 6-0 6-4
1887	(United States) Oliver Campbell	(United States) Edward P. MacMullen	1-6 6-2 7-5 6-4
1888	(United States) Howard Augustus Taylor	(United States) A.W. Post	6-3 6-2 6-4
1897 (Note: 1897 edition there was a challenge round)	(United States) Joseph D. Forbes	(United States) Jahail (John) Parmly Paret	6-1 2-6 4-6 6-0 6-2
1899 (Note: 1899 edition there was a challenge round)	(United States) Jahail (John) Parmly Paret	(United States) George H. Mile	6-4 5-7 6-2 6-4

== See also ==
- Orange Fall Open
- Orange Invitational

== Sources ==
- Hall, Valentine G[ill (1889). Lawn tennis in America. Biographical sketches of all the prominent players ... knotty points, and all the latest rules and directions governing handicaps, umpires, and rules for playing. New York, USA: New York, D. W. Granbery & co.
- Tournament – "Orange Spring Tournament". www.tennisarchives.com. TA. 2017.
