= Henry Beekman Livingston (born 1854) =

American banker and socialite (1854–1931)

- Born: October 3, 1854; New York City, New York, U.S.
- Died: September 8, 1931 (aged 76); New York City, New York, U.S.
- Education: Yale University; Christ Church, Oxford
- Spouses: Stephanie Jacqueline Fox (m. 1876; died 1878) Frances Redmond (m. 1881; died 1916)
- Children: 4
- Parent(s): Henry Beekman Livingston; Mary Lawrence Livingston
- Relatives: See Livingston family

Henry Beekman Livingston Jr. (October 3, 1854 – September 8, 1931) was an American banker, sportsman, and clubman who was prominent in New York society during the Gilded Age.

== Early life ==
Livingston was born at 18 Washington Square North in New York City on October 3, 1854. He was the son of Henry Beekman Livingston Sr. (1818–1861) and Mary Lawrence (née Livingston) Livingston (1821–1883). His siblings included Walter L. Livingston and Margaret Lewis Livingston ("one of the five most beautiful debutantes of her time in society"), who married John Lawrence Lee. His father, who inherited the most valuable share of his grandmother's estate, 68-72 Leonard Street, went into business as Foster & Livingston, which sold Indian shawls among other goods.

His paternal grandparents were Judge Maturin Livingston and Margaret (née Lewis) Livingston, the only daughter and sole heiress of Gov. Morgan Lewis. His uncles included Robert James Livingston and Maturin Livingston Jr. His aunt, Angelica Livingston was married to Alexander Hamilton Jr., son of James Alexander Hamilton and grandson of Alexander Hamilton, the first Secretary of the Treasury. His maternal grandparents were John Swift Livingston, a son of Robert "Cambridge" Livingston and grandson of Robert Livingston.

Livingston attended boarding school at C. D. Morris' in Lake Mohegan, New York, and then entered Yale University with the class of 1877. Due to his "being delicate", he left Yale and went to England where he attended Christ Church, Oxford University for two years.

== Career ==
After returning to the United States, he joined the New York Stock Exchange in August 1882 and, for many years, ran a successful brokerage business. He remained a member of the Exchange for 40 years.

=== Society life ===
In 1892, Livingston and his second wife Frances were included in Ward McAllister's "Four Hundred", purported to be an index of New York's best families, published in The New York Times. Conveniently, 400 was the number of people that could fit into Mrs. Astor's ballroom. Livingston was related and close with many of the most prominent people in New York society as the guests at his second wedding attest, including Mr. and Mrs. Robert L. Livingston, Mr. and Mrs. Maturin Livingston, Mr. and Mrs. Stephen Van Rensselaer, Mr. Campbell Steward, Mr. and Mrs. Philip Schuyler, Mrs. William Morgan and the Misses Morgan.

He was a member of the Union Club of the City of New York, the Knickerbocker Club, the Brook Club, the South Side Sportsmen's Club the Metropolitan Club, the Racquet and Tennis Club and the Turf and Field Club.

== Personal life ==
Livingston was married twice. His first marriage was on September 27, 1876, to Stephanie Jacqueline Fox (1853–1878), the daughter of Samuel Fox and Marie Adelaide (née Livingston) Fox. Before her death in 1878, they were the parents of:

- Mary Angelica Livingston (b. 1877), who was born in Dieppe, France, and who resided at 164 East 72nd Street in New York City, a building memorialized in a poem by James Merrill.

After his first wife's death, Livingston was remarried to Frances Redmond (1849–1916), the fifth daughter of William Redmond and Sabina Elizabeth (née Hoyt) Redmond, on March 1, 1881. Frances was a sister of Goold Hoyt Redmond and a grand-niece of Jesse Hoyt, a Collector of the Port of New York who was known for his role in the Swartwout-Hoyt scandal. In New York, his home was at 63 East 82nd Street and he had a country home in Islip on Long Island. Together, they were the parents of:

- Lilias Livingston (1882–1976), who married Henry Bowly Hollins Jr. (1882–1956), son of Henry Bowly Hollins and Evelina (née Knapp) Hollins and brother of golfer Marion Hollins, on June 28, 1904.
- Mary Lawrence Livingston (1883–1898), who died aged 15.
- Frances Lewis Livingston (b. 1886),

Livingston's wife died in June 1916. He later resided at 47 East 64th Street in New York. He died at his home in New York City on Tuesday September 8, 1931. His funeral was held in Hyde Park, New York and he was buried at St. James Church Cemetery. His estate, estimated more than $500,000, was shared between his unmarried daughters Mary and Frances. His personal property was share between Mary and another daughter, Lilias, who received stock in the Amsterdam Investment Company and the Importers' Building Company. A great-grandson, Reginald Frost, received a $2,400 annuity until he was 21 years old at which point he received the principal of the fund.

=== Descendants ===
Through his daughter Lilias, he was the grandfather of Lilias Hollins (b. 1905), who married Reginald Radcliffe Frost (1897–1950) in 1929; Evelina Hollins (b. 1906); Hope Hollins (1907–1970), who was engaged to the English explorer Frank Bickerton in 1931 but broke the engagement in May before the June wedding; Henry Bowly "Harry" Hollins (1909–1991), who first married Elizabeth Wolcott Elkins (daughter of William M. Elkins) in 1931, and later married author Elizabeth Morgan Jay (1911–1991) in 1948, a descendant of Edwin D. Morgan and John Jay and the former wife of artist Stephen Etnier; Jean Hollins (b. 1910); and Robert Livingston Hollins (b. 1912).
