= Eleanor Cross Marquand =

American art historian

Eleanor Cross Marquand (15 April 1873 – 27 February 1950) was an authority on the representation and symbolism of flowers and trees in art, particularly of floral emblems in the early Christian church. In recognition of this work, she received an honorary Master of Arts Degree from Princeton University in 1948, only the 4th woman in the history of the university to receive this honor.

== Biography ==
Marquand was born in New York, the daughter of Richard J. Cross and Matilda Redmond Cross. Her father was a member of the New York City banking firm of Morton, Bliss & Co. led by Governor Levi P. Morton. In June 1896, she married Allan Marquand, then a professor at Princeton. He would go on to be the founder and first chairman of the Department of Art and Archaeology at Princeton.

Her activities in organized horticulture include membership in the New York Botanical Garden, the Garden Club of America, the Horticultural Society of New York, and the Garden Club of Princeton. She spoke on plant illustration and wrote for the Garden Club of American Bulletin and the Journal of the New York Botanical Garden. She was a founding member of the Hroswitha Club, a group for women bibliophiles. In 1910, she became the first woman to serve on the Princeton Board of Education. Other civic activities included service in the Village Improvement Association and as a board member of the State Hospital in Trenton (now the Trenton Psychiatric Hospital.)

She died on February 27, 1950, in Princeton Hospital. After her death, her estate bequeathed Marquand's botanical and horticultural library to the New York Botanical Garden. It consists of 408 volumes and a collection of notebooks, scrapbooks, photographs, seed and nursery catalogs, reprints, pamphlets and periodicals.

== Bibliography ==
- Marquand, E. (1938) Plant symbolism in the unicorn tapestries. New York, College Art Association
- Marquand, E. (1941) The history of plant illustration to 1850. Washington, D.C, The Garden Club of America
- Marquand, E. (1924) Flora of Jekyl Island, as collected by Dr. and Mrs. Frederic S. Lee, March, 1914; with additions, notes and illustrations by Mrs. Allan Marquand, March, 1923. Revised and edited by Dr. John K. Small, January, 1924.
- Marquand, E. (ca 1943) Dioscorides : Materia medica (Morgan ms. M.652) : plant identifications and miscellaneous notes / ca. 1943
- Marquand, E and Stockton, H H S. (1937) The trees of Guernsey Manuscript
