= Willard (name) =

The name Willard may refer to:

== People ==
=== Surname ===
- Aaron Willard (1757–1844), Boston industrialist
- Adam Willard, (born 1973), drummer
- Aimee Willard (1974–1996), murder victim
- Alexander Hamilton Willard (1778–1865), member of the Lewis and Clark Expedition
- Alice Willard (1860–1936), American journalist and businesswoman
- Archibald Willard (1836–1918), American painter
- Ashbel P. Willard (1820–1860), American politician, governor of Indiana
- Barbara Willard (1909–1994), British author
- Beatrice Willard (1925–2003), American botanist
- Charity Cannon Willard (1914–2005), American scholar and author
- Charles W. Willard (1827–1880), American politician from Vermont
- Clarence E. Willard (1882–1962), American vaudeville performer
- Cyrus Field Willard (1858–1942), American journalist, political activist, theosophist, and freemason
- Dallas Willard (1935–2013), American philosopher and author
- Dan Willard, American computer scientist and logician
- Daniel Willard (1861–1942), American railroad executive
- Edward Smith Willard (1853–1915), English stage actor
- Elen Willard (born 1941), American actress
- Emma Willard (1787–1870), American activist and educator
- Frances Willard (suffragist) (1839–1898), American educator, temperance reformer and women's suffragist
- Frances Willard (magician) (born 1940), stage magician
- Fred Willard (1933–2020), American actor
- George Willard (1824–1901), American politician from Michigan
- Helen S. Willard (1894–1980), American occupational therapist
- Horace B. Willard (1825–1900), American politician
- Howard W. Willard (1894–1960), American printmaker, illustrator
- Huntington Willard (born c. 1953), American geneticist
- Jess Willard (1881–1968), American boxer
- Jess Willard (footballer) (1924–2005), English football player and coach
- John Willard (disambiguation), several people:
  - John Willard (died 1692), American witchcraft defendant
  - John Willard (judge) (1792–1862), American lawyer and politician from New York
  - John Willard (playwright) (1885–1942), American
  - John D. Willard (1799–1864), American lawyer and politician from New York
- Joseph Willard (1738–1804), American clergyman and academic
- Joseph A. Willard (1803–1868), American politician from New York
- Josiah Willard (1805–1868), American activist
- Ken Willard (born 1943), American football player
- Kenneth R. Willard (1902–1987), American politician from New York
- Kevin Willard (born 1975), American basketball coach
- Marcel Willard (1889–1956), French politician
- Martin Louis Willard (1842–1921), American politician from New York
- Mary Louisa Willard (1898–1993), American college professor
- Mary Thompson Hill Willard (1805–1892), American social reformer
- Nancy Willard (1936–2017), American author and poet
- Ralph Willard (born 1946), American basketball coach
- Robert F. Willard (born 1950), US Navy officer
- Rod Willard (born 1960), Canadian ice hockey player
- Samuel Willard (1640–1707), American colonial clergyman
- Sidney Willard (1780–1856), American politician from Massachusetts
- Simon Willard (1753–1848), American maker of Simon Willard clocks
- Simon Willard (first generation) (1605–1676), Massachusetts colonist
- Solomon Willard (1783–1861), American stonecarver and builder
- Sylvie Willard (born 1952), French bridge player
- Victor Willard (born 1815, date of death unknown), American farmer and politician
- Xerxes Addison Willard (1820–1882), American dairyman, lawyer, and newspaper editor

=== Given name ===
- Willard Bartlett (1846–1925), American judge from New York
- Willard Harrison Bennett (1903–1987), American physicist
- Willard Boyle (1924–2011), Canadian physicist
- Willard Brown (1915–1996), American baseball player
- Willard H. Brownson (1845–1935), US Navy officer
- Willard C. Butcher (1926–2012), American banker
- Willard S. Curtin (1905–1996), American politician from Pennsylvania
- Willard Dewveall (1936–2006), American football player
- Willard Dyson, American drummer
- Willard R. Espy (1910–1999), American editor, philologist, writer, and poet
- Willard Estey (1919–2002), Canadian judge
- Willard Gemmill (1875–1935), American judge from Indiana
- Willard Hall (1780–1875), American lawyer and politician from Delaware
- Willard Preble Hall (1820–1882), American lawyer and politician, governor of Missouri
- Willard J. Heacock (1821–1906), American businessman and politician
- Willard Hershberger (1910–1940), American baseball player
- Willard Ikola (1932–2025), American ice hockey player and coach
- Willard D. James (1927–2025), American mathematician
- Willard Johnson (politician) (1820–1900), American politician from New York
- Willard F. Jones (1890–1967), Naval engineer and Gulf Oil executive
- Willard Keith (1920–1942), American Marine officer
- Willard Kennedy, better known as Bill Kennedy (actor) (1908–1997), American actor and voice artist
- Willard Libby (1908–1980), American chemist
- Willard Maas (1906–1971), American experimental filmmaker and poet
- Willard Kitchener MacDonald (1906–1971), "the Hermit of Gully Lake" in Canada
- Willard Mack (1873–1934), Canadian-American actor, director, and playwright
- Willard Manus (1930–2023), American novelist, playwright, and journalist
- J. Willard Marriott (1900–1985), American businessman
- Willard Marshall (1921–2000), American baseball player
- Willard May (1933–2016), American pastor and educator, founder of the Long Beach Marine Institute
- W. Eugene McCombs (1925–2004), American politician from North Carolina
- Willard Metcalf (1858–1925), American artist
- Willard Mullin (1902–1978), American sports cartoonist
- Willard H. Murray Jr. (1931–2021), American politician from California
- Willard Mwanza (born 1997), Zambian footballer
- Willard Zerbe Park (1906–1965), anthropologist
- Willard Phelps (born 1941), former Yukon politician
- Willard Price (1887–1983), American natural historian and author
- Willard Van Orman Quine (1908–2000), American philosopher and logician
- Willard Ransom (1916–1995), American lawyer, businessman, community civic leader, and a civil rights activist
- Willard Richards (1804–1854), leader in the Latter Day Saint movement
- Willard Rockwell (1888–1988), businessman
- Willard Mitt Romney (born 1947), better known as Mitt Romney, 70th Governor of Massachusetts and Republican presidential nominee
- Willard Ryan (1890–1962), American football coach
- Willard Saulsbury Jr. (1861–1927), American politician from Delaware
- Willard Saulsbury Sr. (1820–1892), American politician from Delaware
- Willard Scott (1934–2021), American journalist
- Willard Cleon Skousen (1913–2006), American author and conservative faith-based political theorist
- Willard Carroll Smith II, better known as Will Smith (born 1968), American actor, producer, and rapper
- Willard J. Smith (1910–2000), Commandant of the United States Coast Guard
- Willard Dickerman Straight (1880–1918), American investment banker and diplomat
- Willard Thorp (1899–1992), economist, academic, and presidential advisor
- Willard Saxby Townsend (1895–1957), African-American labour leader
- Willard Van Dyke (1906–1986), American filmmaker and photographer
- Willard Warner (1826–1906), brigadier general in the Union Army during the American Civil War
- Willard Watson (1921–1995), African-American folk artist from Caddo Parish, Louisiana
- W. Garfield Weston (1898–1978), Canadian businessman
- Willard Wheatley (1915–1997), Chief Minister of the British Virgin Islands
- Sir Willard White (born 1946), British bass-baritone
- Willard Wigan (born 1957), British sculptor
- Willard Huntington Wright, better known under his pen name S. S. Van Dine (1888–1939), American art critic and author

== Other ==
- F.D.C. Willard, Siamese cat that coauthored several physics papers between 1975 and 1980.

== See also ==
- Descendants of Simon Willard (1605–1676)
