= John Henry Nash (printer) =

Fine printer (b. 1871, d. 1947)

John Henry Nash (1871–1947) was a fine printer.

== Life ==
He was born in Woodbridge, Ontario, Canada and left school at sixteen to apprentice as a printer. In 1895, he arrived in San Francisco, where he was to develop his reputation. With Bruce Brough he founded the Twentieth Century Press. In 1903, Nash was approached by Paul Elder, an established publisher who had printed some of his publications with Twentieth Century, and who had just dissolved a publishing partnership. Elder became a partner in Twentieth Century Press, which was renamed Tomoye Press, and Nash became a partner in the newly formed Paul Elder & Company. Nash designed and typeset many of Elder's most enduring publications.

Nash and Elder had a falling out in 1911, and Nash formed a new partnership, which he ended in 1915. In 1916, Nash started his own press, and his efforts helped establish San Francisco as a center of fine printing. In titling his 1928 book about Nash, Edward F. O'Day went so far as to dub him "The Aldus of San Francisco." In 1938, the poor economy forced him to shut down his operation.

In 1938 Nash moved to Eugene, Oregon, where he established the John Henry Nash Fine Arts Press at the University of Oregon. In 1943, he returned to Berkeley, California, where he died in 1947.

== Selected bibliography ==
Robert Louis Stevenson, The Silverado Squatters (1923). With illustrations by Howard Whitford Willard.

Robert D. Harlan, John Henry Nash: A Biography of a Career (1970).

== Papers ==
- The John Henry Nash papers reside at the Bancroft Library, University of California, Berkeley.
- Works published by John Henry Nash contained in the Bender Collection at the Library of Trinity College Dublin.
