= Simon Willard (disambiguation) =

Simon Willard (1753–1848) was an American clockmaker.

Simon Willard may also refer to:

- Simon Willard (Massachusetts colonist) (1605–1676), an early Massachusetts fur trader and colonist

== See also ==
- Descendants of Simon Willard
