= A Very Merry Chipmunk =

Studio album by Alvin and the Chipmunks
- Released: December 1994
- Recorded: November 1993
- Studio: Chipmunk
- Length: 45:31
- Label: Chipmunk; Sony; Columbia
- Producer: The Chipmunks

Alvin and the Chipmunks chronology
Chipmunks in Low Places (1992)	A Very Merry Chipmunk (1994)	When You Wish Upon a Chipmunk (1995)

Professional ratings
Review scores
Source	Rating
Allmusic	4/5 stars

A Very Merry Chipmunk is a 1994 music album by Alvin and the Chipmunks, released by Sony Wonder. It is their fourth Christmas album. The album reached #147 on the Billboard 200.

== Track listing ==
1. "Here Comes Christmas" (Thomas Chase/Steve Rucker/Jill H. Roberts) – 2:40
  Musicians and vocalists
  Jai Winding — keyboards
  Ron Hicklin — singing voice of Alvin
  Gene Morford — singing voice of Simon
  Randy Crenshaw — singing voice of Theodore
  Production crew
  Guy DeFazio — engineer
2. "The Chipmunk Song (Christmas Don't Be Late)" (with Kenny G) (Ross Bagdasarian Sr.) – 5:33
  Musicians and vocalists
  Kenny G — saxophone
  Dean Parks — guitar
  Nathan East — bass
  John Capek — keyboards
  Michael Botts — drums and percussion
  Gerry Beckley — singing voice of Alvin
  Andrew Gold — singing voice of Simon
  Jeff Foskett — singing voice of Theodore
  Production crew
  John Boylan — co-producer
  Bob Wartinbee — recording engineer
  Steve Shepherd — recording engineer
  Guy DeFazio — recording engineer
  Duane Seykora — assistant recording engineer
  Jerry Finn — assistant recording engineer
  Paul Grupp — mixing engineer
  Roland Alvarez — mixing engineer
3. "Rockin' Around the Christmas Tree" (with Patty Loveless) (Johnny Marks) – 3:37
  Musicians and vocalists
  Patty Loveless — lead vocals
  B. James Lowry — lead guitar
  Dan Dugmore — steel guitar
  Gordon Kennedy — rhythm guitar
  Mike Brignardello — bass
  Paul Leim — drums
  Wayne Kirkpatrick — singing voice of Alvin
  Bergen White — singing voice of Simon
  Chris Harris — singing voice of Theodore
  Production crew
  John Boylan — co-producer
  Steve Bishir — recording engineer
  Martin Woodley — assistant recording engineer
  Paul Grupp — mixing engineer
  Roland Alvarez — mixing engineer
4. "Christmas Time Uptown" (with The Boys Choir of Harlem) (Paul Espel/Karmyn Lott/Malcom Dodds) – 4:45
  Musicians and vocalists
  The Boys Choir of Harlem — vocals
  Ross Bagdasarian — Chipmunk vocals and all instruments
  Production crew
  Dr. Walter J. Turnbull — choir director
  M. Roger Holland — vocal arrangement
  Darren "Nitro" Clowers — co-producer
  Bob Friedrich — recording engineer
  Mark Agostino — recording engineer
  Coney Abrams — mixing engineer
5. "A Comes Before B" (Janice Karman) – 2:13
  Musicians and vocalists
  Jai Winding — keyboards
  Ross Bagdasarian — Alvin (speaking voice)
  Andrew Gold — Alvin (singing voice)
  Production crew
  Guy DeFazio — engineer
6. "Rudolph the Red-Nosed Reindeer" (with Gene Autry) (Johnny Marks) – 2:44
  Musicians and vocalists
  Gene Autry — lead vocal
  John Capek — keyboards, programming
  Nick Brown — guitar
  Bob Mann — bass
  Michael Botts — drums
  Ron Hicklin — singing voice of Alvin
  John Andrew Parks — singing voice of Simon
  Randy Crenshaw — singing voice of Theodore
  Production crew
  John Boylan — co-producer
  Ian Gardiner — recording engineer
  Guy DeFazio — recording engineer
  Bob Loftus — assistant recording engineer
  Naoki Taya — assistant recording engineer
  Paul Grupp — mixing engineer
  Roland Alvarez — mixing engineer
7. "Petit Papa Noël" (with Celine Dion) (Raymond Vinci/Henry Martinet) – 5:29
  Musicians and vocalists
  Celine Dion — lead vocals
  Andrew Gold — keyboards/guitar/keyboard programming
  Ron Hicklin — singing voice of Alvin
  Gene Morford — singing voice of Simon
  Randy Crenshaw — singing voice of Theodore
  Production crew
  John Boylan — co-producer
  Andrew Gold — co-producer/recording engineer
  Umberto Gatica — recording engineer
  Guy DeFazio — recording engineer
  Stephen Harrison — assistant recording engineer
  Bob Loftus — assistant recording engineer
  Naoki Taya — assistant recording engineer
  Paul Grupp — mixing engineer
  Roland Alvarez — mixing engineer
8. "Santa's Gonna Come in a Pickup Truck" (with Alan Jackson) (Don Rich/Red Simpson) – 4:13
  Musicians and vocalists
  Alan Jackson — lead vocal
  Eddie Bayers — drums
  Brent Mason — electric guitar
  Roy Husky — bass
  Hargus "Pig" Robbins — piano
  Stuart Duncan — fiddle
  Bruce Watkins — acoustic guitar
  Paul Franklin — steel guitar
  Wayne Kirkpatrick — singing voice of Alvin
  Bergen White — singing voice of Simon
  Chris Harris — singing voice of Theodore
  Production crew
  Keith Stegall — co-producer
  Steve Bishir — recording engineer
  Guy DeFazio — mixing engineer
9. "The Little Drummer Boy" (with The UCLA Chamber Singers) (Katherine Davis/Henry Onorati/Harry Simeone) – 4:18
  Musicians and vocalists
  The UCLA Chamber Singers — principal vocals
  John Capek — keyboards and programming
  Michael Botts — drums
  Ron Hicklin — singing voice of Alvin
  Gene Morford — singing voice of Simon
  Randy Crenshaw — singing voice of Theodore
  Production crew
  John Boylan — co-producer
  Ian Gardiner — recording engineer
  Paul Grupp — recording engineer/mixing engineer
  Guy DeFazio — recording engineer
  Roland Alvarez — assistant recording engineer/mixing engineer
10. "I Don't Want to Be Alone for Christmas (Unless I'm Alone with You)" (performed by James Ingram) (Steve Lindsey) – 6:32
  Musicians and vocalists
  James Ingram — vocals
  Robbie Buchanan — keyboards/drum programming
  Brandon Fields — saxophone
  Production crew
  Steve Lindsey — producer
  Gabe Veltri — recording engineer
  John Hendrickson — assistant recording engineer
  Jim Champagne — assistant recording engineer
  Bill Schnee — mixing engineer
11. "The Chipmunk Song (Christmas Don't Be Late)" (Reprise) (with Kenny G) (Ross Bagdasarian Sr.) – 3:27 — same credits as track 2

== For all tracks ==
Musicians and vocalists

- Ross Bagdasarian Jr. — spoken voices of Alvin, Simon and David Seville
- Janice Karman — spoken voices of Theodore and Brittany

Production crew

- Ross Bagdasarian — producer
- Janice Karman — writer/producer
- Marc Rashba — marketing and promotion
- Denice Ferguson — production coordinator
- Teri Wegel — production coordinator
- Traci Sterling — production coordinator (on Patty Loveless' and Alan Jackson's vocals)
