= Boys Choir of Harlem =

Choir in Harlem, New York City, U.S.

- Choir
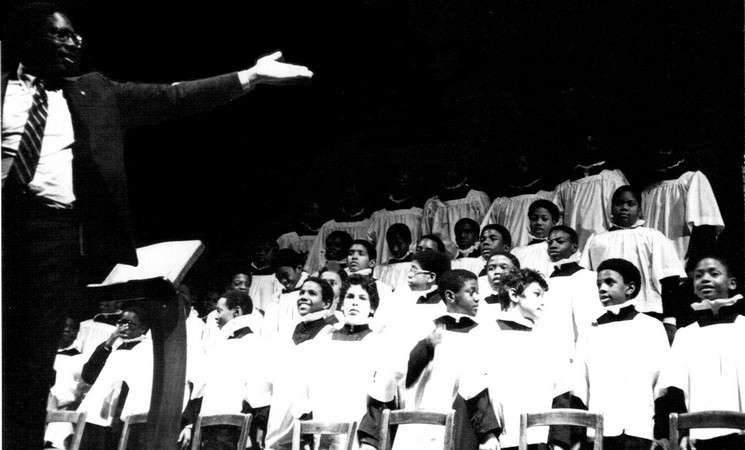
- The Boys Choir of Harlem in Paris, France in 1974
- Also known as: Harlem Boys Choir
- Origin: Harlem, New York City
- Founded: 1968
- Founder: Walter J. Turnbull
- Disbanded: 2007
- Genre: Classical, gospel, jazz
- Headquarters: Church of the Intercession
- Rehearsal space: Arthur Schomburg School
- Awards: National Medal of Arts (1996)

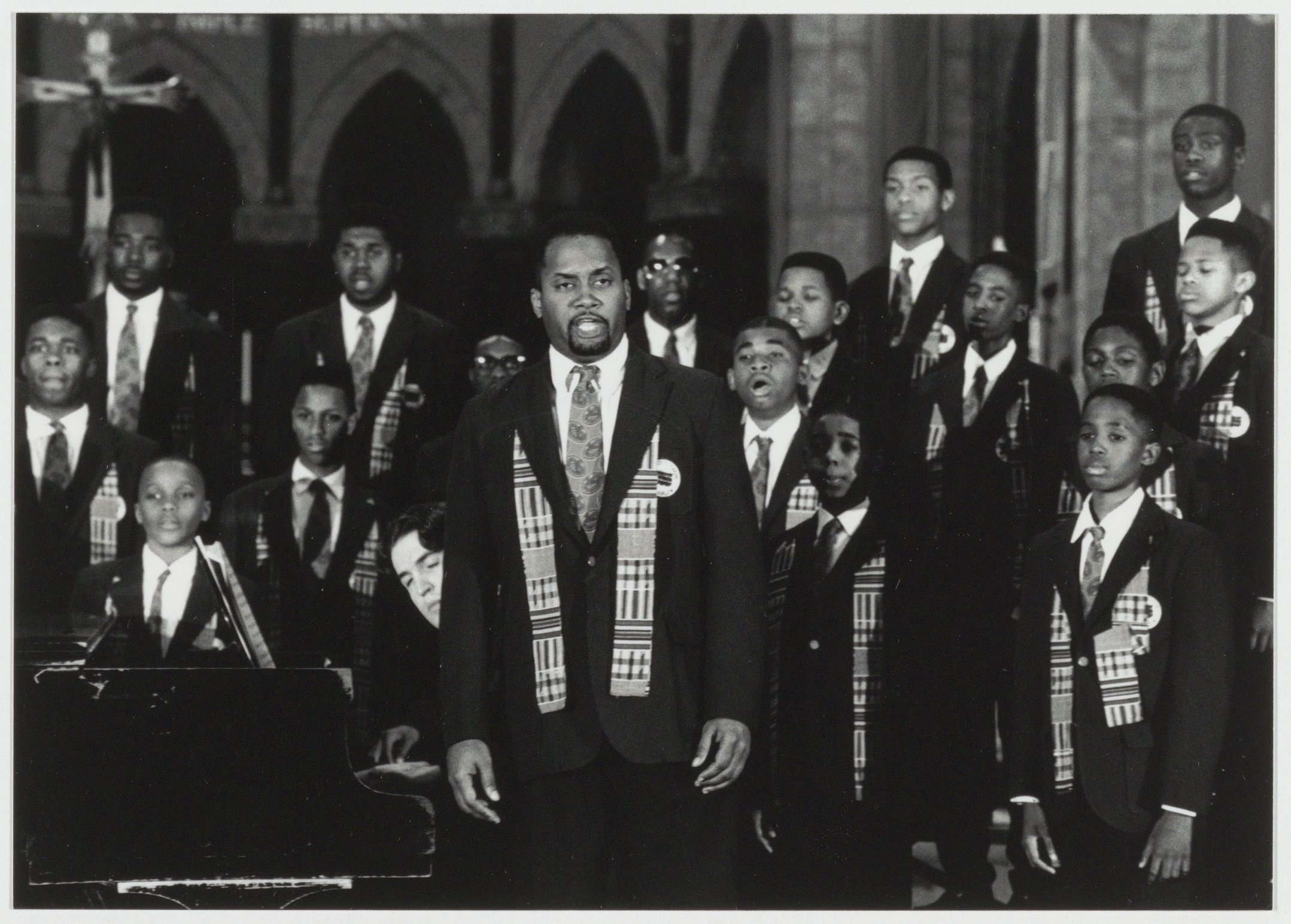
The Boys Choir of Harlem in Haarlem, the Netherlands in 1992

The Boys Choir of Harlem (also known as the Harlem Boys Choir) was a choir located in Harlem, New York City, United States. Its final performance after 40 years of operation was in 2007. The group folded shortly thereafter due to several controversies, including a large budget deficit, and the death of its founder.

== Early years ==
Founded in 1968 by Dr. Walter Turnbull at the Ephesus Seventh-day Adventist Church in Harlem, the choir grew to be more than just a performing group. Drawn from inner-city children in the neighborhood, the majority of the choir's members were African-American or Hispanic. In its early years, Rev. Frederick B. Williams gave them a base at the Church of the Intercession at 155th Street and Broadway.

The choir established a professional school incorporating a regular academic curriculum, the Choir Academy of Harlem. It was supervised by the New York City Department of Education; at its peak, it had a student body of over 500 boys and girls. Because of staff misconduct, the group lost use of the school facility in 2006.

== Performances ==
Performers received rigorous voice training and performed many types of music, including classical, hip-hop, R&B, jazz, and gospel music. The choir was internationally known, with over 150,000 people seeing it live each year across the United States as well as in Canada, France, Japan, the Netherlands, and the United Kingdom. Unlike its Austrian cousin, the Vienna Boys Choir, the Boys Choir of Harlem did not include only boys who had not reached puberty. The range of music performed was such that it required both natural boy sopranos whose voices had not yet changed and more mature voices of teenagers who could sing tenor and bass roles.

The choir performed for Presidents at the White House and dignitaries at the United Nations. It also performed live for the visits of international dignitaries such as Nelson Mandela of South Africa and Pope John Paul II.

The choir was recorded for soundtracks of films, including Glory, Malcolm X, and many Spike Lee films. It performed on Chicago rapper Kanye West's song "Two Words". The boys' voices have also been part of albums with Michael Jackson, Kathleen Battle, Luciano Pavarotti, Quincy Jones, Kiss, and more. The choir also performed "America the Beautiful" to open WrestleMania XX. In 1994, the choir recorded the original song "Christmas Time Uptown" with Alvin and the Chipmunks for the holiday album A Very Merry Chipmunk.

The choir has also sung verses of WNBC Channel 4's campaign jingle, "We're 4 New York" in both 1992 and 2002.

Following the 9/11 attacks on the World Trade Center, the choir was invited to sing "God Bless America" at the Cantor Fitzgerald memorial service in Central Park. This was filmed in the documentary In Memoriam: New York City 9/11/01. They also performed "This Little Light of Mine" with Odetta on the Late Show with David Letterman, appearing on the first show after Letterman resumed broadcasting, after having been off the air for several nights, following the events of September 11. During the Prayer for America memorial service at Yankee Stadium (1923), the choir, with the Girls Choir of Harlem, performed "We Shall Overcome".

In 1995, they performed as Munchkins in The Wizard of Oz in Concert: Dreams Come True, a musical concert at Lincoln Center to benefit the Children's Defense Fund. The performance was originally broadcast on both TBS and TNT. It issued on CD and video in 1996. The choir collaborated with R&B singer Joe on his song "Ghetto Child".

== Musicians ==
Since its inception, The Boys Choir of Harlem featured first-class Piano Accompanists. The Principal Accompanist for the choir was always a pianist who needed to be extremely versatile in order to play the range of music styles from Classical to Spirituals to Gospel to Jazz and Pop music. Also, the touring group featured a "Jazz Band" which included a drummer, bassist, guitarist and keyboard player (in addition to the Principal Piano Accompanists who sometimes doubled on keyboards). The Girls Choir also featured a Piano Accompanist. Among the many talented musicians that toured with the choir included Eric Reed, Keith Burton, Willard Dyson, Isaac ben Ayala, Darryl Smith, Aleeza Meir, Joseph Joubert, Doug Jordan, Harry Miller, Glenn Pearson, Robin Pitre and many more throughout the years.

== Controversy ==
The choir for many years enjoyed the sponsorship of the City of New York; former NYC Mayor David Dinkins authorized their free use of the Arthur Schomburg School on East 127th Street in Harlem. The choir director lost this support through a series of scandals.

First, his lack of financial controls led to the program's running up a $5 million deficit. Second, in the spring of 2001, a 14-year-old student came forward to founder and director Walter Turnbull and reported that the choir's chief counselor, Frank Jones Jr., had been molesting him for years. Turnbull failed to notify the police and did nothing to investigate the allegations.

It was later revealed that Turnbull and his brother, Horace, the choir's executive vice president, allowed Jones to stay in contact with students even after city officials explicitly banned him from the 650-student academy (a public school that is overseen and financed in part by the Department of Education). Jones was allowed to remain so close to students that he was called upon by the Turnbulls to chaperone at least eight overnight choir trips. A city school official reported to investigators that Horace Turnbull had complained to her that barring Mr. Jones was "a hardship," because he was "an integral part" of the program.

The silence regarding the allegations against Jones was eventually broken when the 14-year-old student's mother went to the authorities. That fall Jones was arrested, tried and sentenced to two years in prison for multiple counts of third-degree sexual abuse and endangerment of a child. As a result, the city school system's investigative arm recommended that the Department of Education "sever all ties" with the academy if the Turnbulls remain. Shortly after, the Department of Education did just that and evicted the choir from the city-owned school property where they had been operating rent-free since 1993. The Choir relocated to the Metropolitan Community Methodist Church.

Walter Turnbull died at age 62 on March 23, 2007, in a New York City hospital after suffering a massive stroke.

In 2009 choir alumnus Terrance Wright announced at the Metropolitan Community Methodist Church that the Choir was officially closed down.

== Awards and legacy ==
In 1996, the Choir was awarded the National Medal of Arts.

Some members of the choir continue to sing as part of the Alumni Ensemble of Harlem.
