= Events and festivals in Pristina =

This is a list of some of the major festivals and events held in Kosovo's capital city Pristina, which are common occurrences throughout the year in the city.

== Music festivals ==
=== EtnoFest ===
Etno Fest is a cultural event held in Kukaj village during summertime. As the years passed the festival progressed into something bigger than the exposure of traditional food and folkloric music. Actors, dancers, musicians, cooks, painters and photographers show their respective skills during the event. One of the most visited areas in EtnoFest is the acting stage where local plays are performed. Within EtnoFest exists a smaller festival named AgroFest and where traditional Albanian food is served.

The founder of EtnoFest is the Albanian director Fadil Hysaj. The festival usually lasts for 5 to 7 days.

=== Pristina Jazz Festival ===
The Pristina Jazz Festival is a music festival where jazz artists from all over the world perform. It is held annually in October and November, in the ODA theatre. Pristina Jazz Festival has hosted artists such as:Uri Caine, Tom Kennedy, Reggie Washington, Giulio Martino, Willard Dyson, Bob Albanese, Hans-Joachim Roedelius, Robin Verheyen, Aki Rissanen, Peppe La Pussata, Tim Story, Francesco D’Errico, and Yiotis Kiourtisoglou.

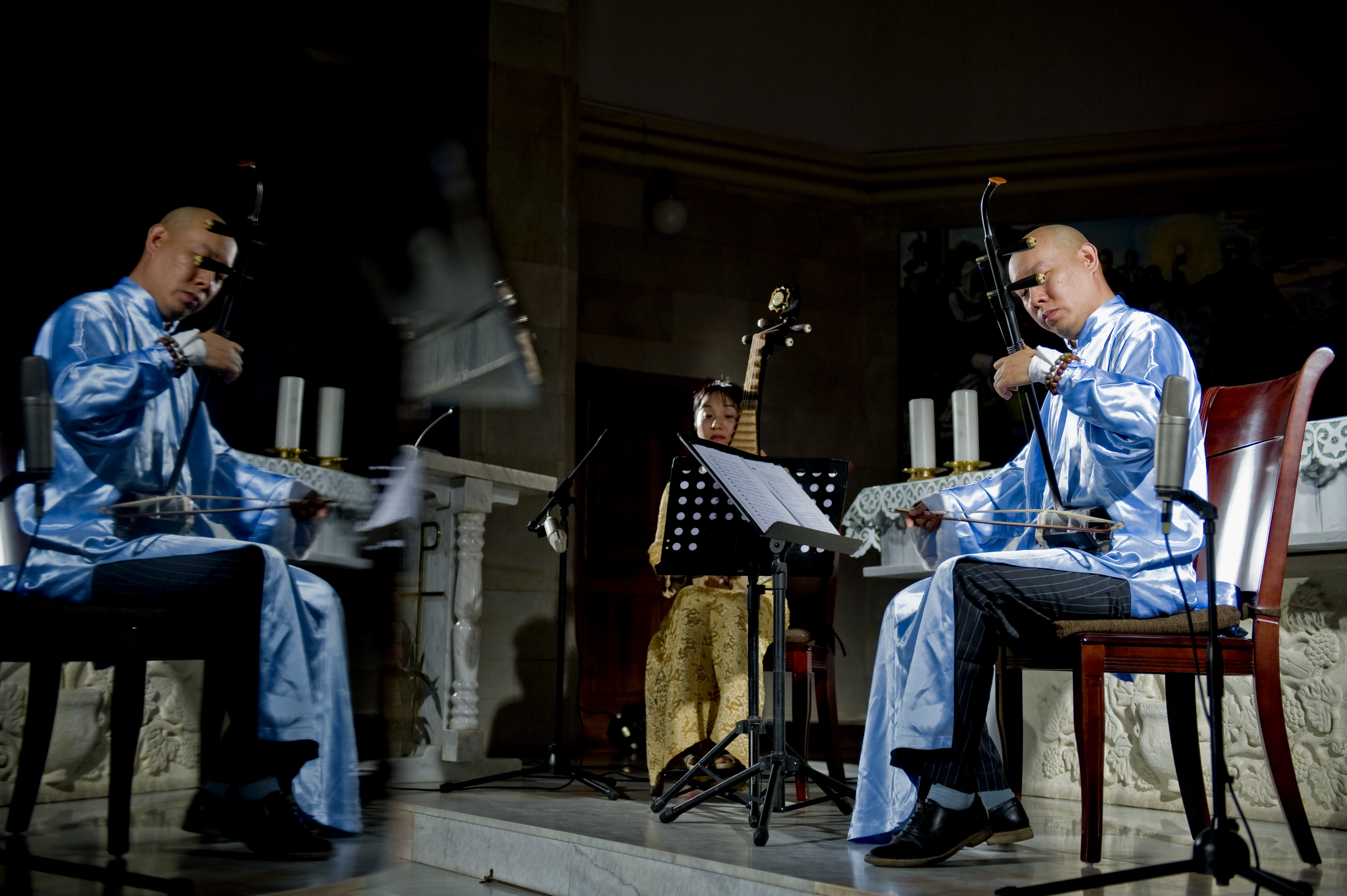
ReMusica Festival

=== ReMusica ===
ReMusica is a festival where a group of Albanians from Kosovo led by Rafet Rudi (the founder of the festival) promote contemporary music, through presentations of different stylistics tendencies of the 20th century up to the present day. ReMusica, so far, had a lot of guest artists from all over the world – from individual ones to collective ensembles such as: Aki Takahashi, Peter Sheppard Skaerved, Rafael Andia, Andreas Lewin Richter, Vande Gorne, and Ensemble Vivendi. This festival is held every year in May.

=== Beer and Wine Festival - Prishtina ===
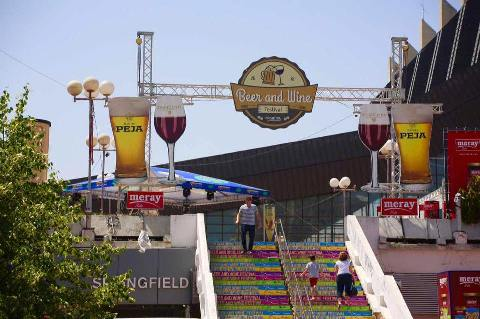
Beer and Wine Festival

Beer and Wine Festival is one of the biggest touristic events that happens in the first days of the summer in the capital of Republic of Kosovo - Prishtina.

Rich artistic program, the given support to local producers of wine & beer products as part of social culture, and promotion of young artists who aim to enter the world music, is one of the characteristics that characterizes the festival.

The main focus of the festival is on bringing new innovations that enrich the cultural and social life, since year after year, welcomes a large numbers of visitors.

=== Coffee and Tea Festival - Prishtine ===
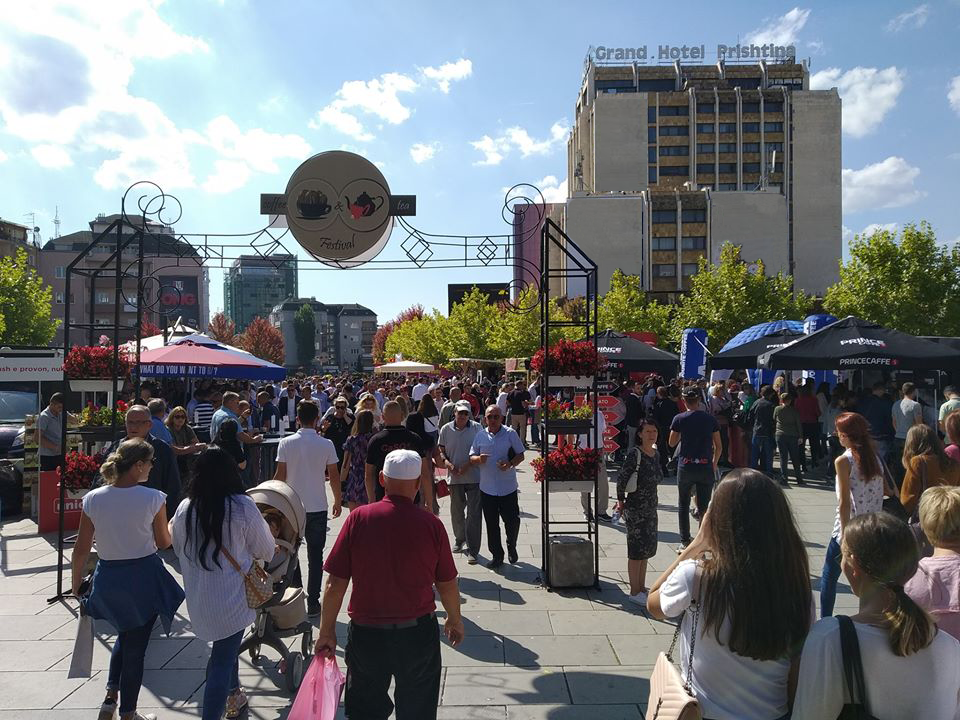
Coffee and Tea Festival - Prishtine

If you are a coffee or a tea lover, then you definitely need to visit this festival.

Held annually during the early days of the autumn season, the event serves as a regional gathering that showcases a variety of coffee and tea brands operating within both domestic and international markets. In addition to the commercial exhibition of beverage products, the multi-day festival organizes a structured schedule of cultural events, educational programs, and live artistic performances. These complementary activities are designed to engage attendees and provide entertainment alongside the main vendor displays in the public venue.

COFFEE AND TEA FESTIVAL has a promotional and cultural/educational character which is held in the "Zahir Pajaziti" Square known as one of the most frequented locations of the capital - Prishtina.

=== Chopin Piano Fest ===
The Chopin Piano Fest is a festival held in April every year. It has become a traditional piano festival, where local and international pianists perform piano works by well known composers, classical and contemporary ones. The festival is organized by Prof. Lejla Haxhiu-Pula, the first pianist in Kosovo.

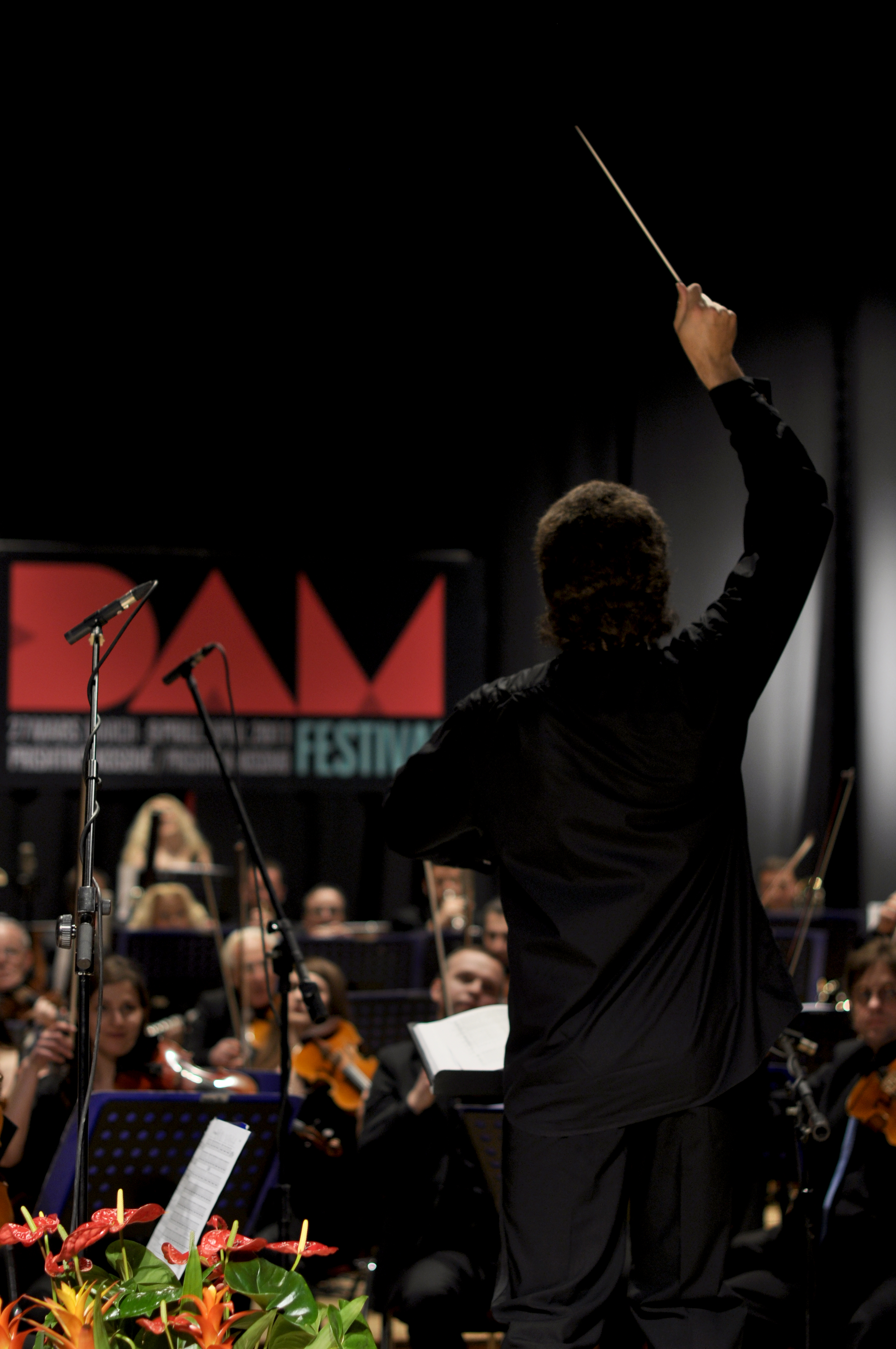
DAM fest.

=== DAM Fest ===
Translated as "The International Festival of Young Musicians", this festival brings classical music to Pristina, with performances by hundreds of musicians in various venues during March and April. It was first held in 2006. This festival aims to present new and young musicians from different countries of the world, while highlighting new forms of musical expression.

=== VideoFest ===
The VideoFest festival is a showcase of video clips, which different musicians and entertainers create. Artists from Kosovo and places nearby compete with one another for the main prize. VideoFest aims to promote and stimulate the creativity productions in the aforementioned territories. The jury does the selection of the best video-clips in different genres but also the best video-clip of the year.

== Arts events ==
=== International exhibition of Gjon Mili ===
Gjon Mili is an international exhibition and competition that is held every two years in The National Gallery of Kosovo. This event is a memorial for one of the most famous Kosovan photographers in the last century, Gjon Mili. Some of the previous winners are: Genc Kadriu (2013), Driton Paçarada (2002), and Mumin Jashari (2004).

=== Muslim Mulliqi ===
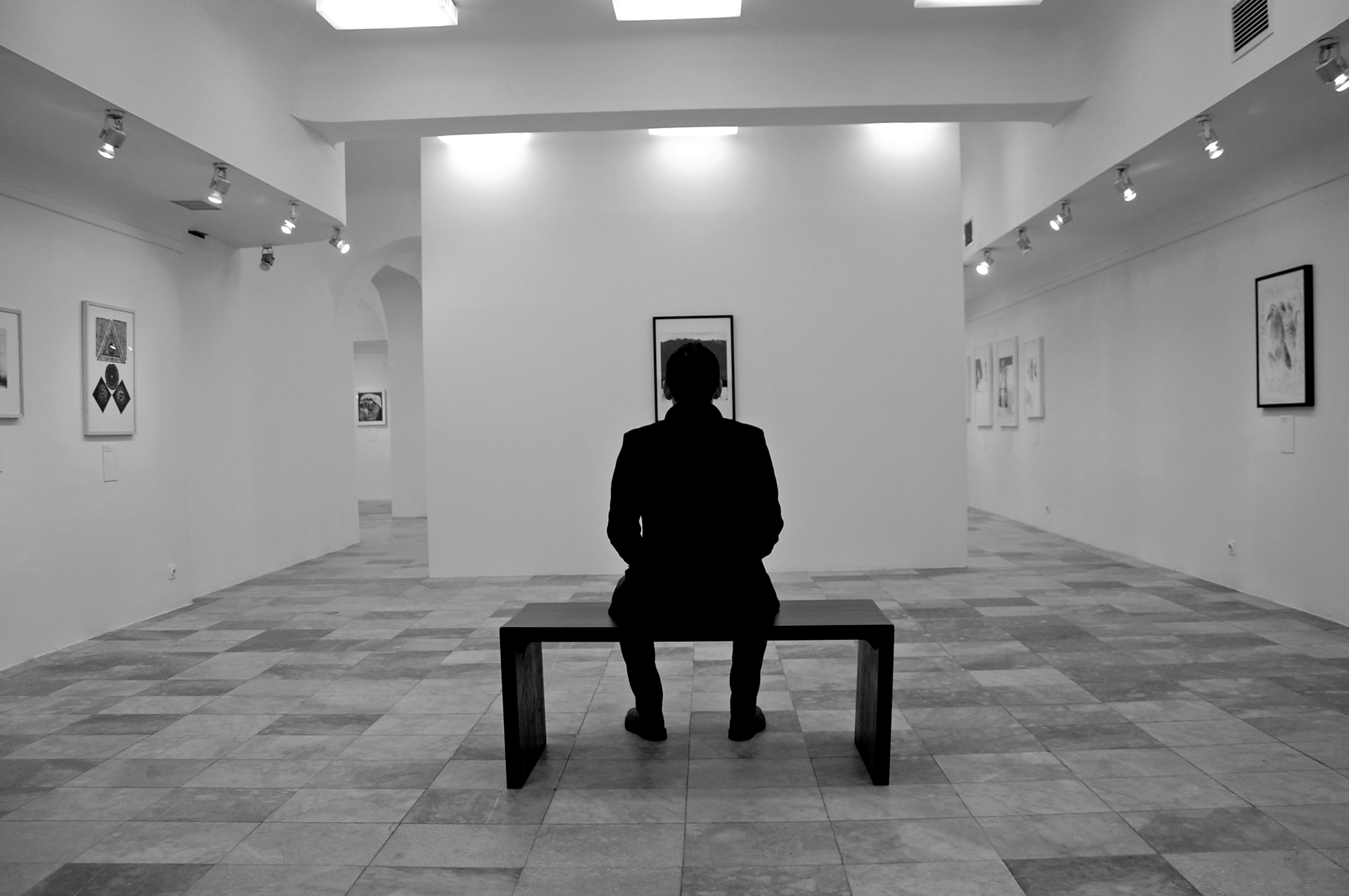
Exhibition

Muslim Mulliqi is an exhibition which displays visual arts such as painting, drawings, videos, etc. A contest is opened yearly by The National Gallery of Kosovo giving any artist the chance to participate. The winner is chosen by a committee.

=== Artist of Tomorrow ===
This event is a program initiated by Wendy W. Luers, founder and director of Foundation For a Civil Society in the United States. It is an exhibition that provides space for young creators to showcase their art. The project is built with help from The American Embassy in Kosovo. The most hardworking youngster is given the opportunity to travel to the US in order to represent Kosovo for a month. After the trip the winner is also encouraged to have a personal exhibition in order to share the newly gained experience. This contest is held every year in The National Gallery of Kosovo.

== Sports events ==
=== Car racing ===
Two events of car racing are held during the year. The first one is highway car-racing and it is held in June, the other has a Tōge racing theme i.e The cars race in mountains and hills. Participants need to be well trained and the vehicles under great conditions. The event is organized by FASK (Federate of Auto Sports in Kosovo).

=== Pristina's Half Marathon ===
Pristina’s Half Marathon is an event that is organized from Ministry for Culture and Sport. The main reason of this half marathon is to promote the values of peace, coexistence and excellence in sports, and this is the reason that the motto of this Marathon is “Run for Peace and Tolerance". In this half marathon participate people from different countries, like: Kosovo, Kenya, Morocco, Hungary, Ukraine, Sweden, Albania, North Macedonia, Serbia, Bulgaria and Moldova. All participants will be awarded with certificates, ranking and finishing time, but the best finishers in senior, veteran and disabled category for men and women will be awarded from a total of 12.000 euros.
