= Plainfield Academy (Connecticut) =

Defunct school in Connecticut, United States

Coordinates: 41.6847°N 71.9117°W

Plainfield Academy was a school in Windham County, Connecticut founded in 1770 and closed in 1890. One of the school buildings was documented for the Historic American Buildings Survey. The school attracted students from around New England and was considered one of the best in Connecticut. It educated many students who went on to prominence. Chickasaw Indians were among its pupils.

== History ==
Ebenezer Pemberton was the school's first principal. Land for the school was given by Lydia German and others. The school was coeducational, teaching men and women together. Teacher and educational reformer Prudence Crandall, who taught nearby, was inspired by its model including the way it avoided corporal punishment.

An image of the school is included in the 1917 publication The Government of the People in the State of Connecticut noting it as one of Connecticut's most significant educational institutions.

== Legacy ==
After the school closed, two of its buildings (White Hall and Brock Hall) were used for district schools. Rev. Lucien Burleigh was principal of its grammar school from 1855 until 1860. John Witter also served as principal.

== Alumni ==
- John Paine Cushman, U.S. Congressman, university regent, and judge
- J. Cleaveland Cady, architect
- Calvin Goddard, lawyer and Speaker of the House in the Connecticut legislature.
