= Ebenezer Pemberton =

American educator

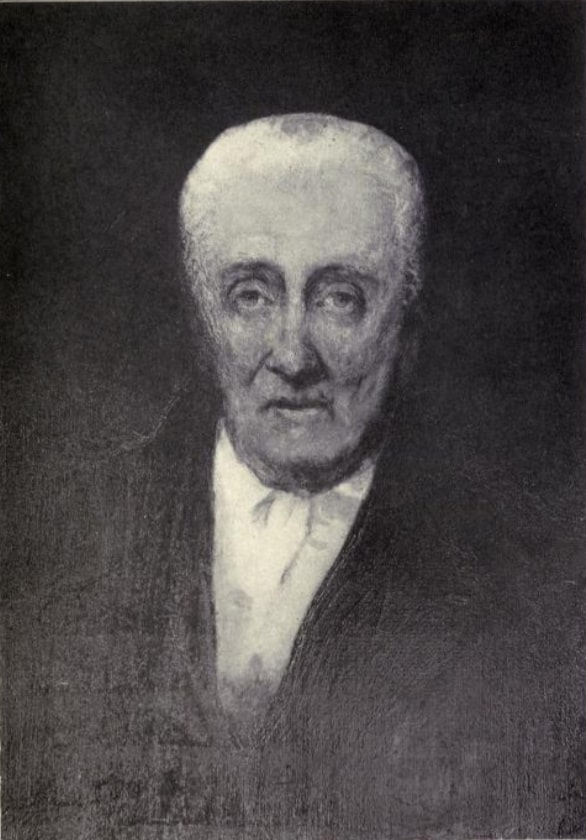
- Pemberton by William Morris Hunt

2nd Principal of Phillips Academy
- In office 1786–1793
- Preceded by: Eliphalet Pearson
- Succeeded by: Mark Newman

Personal details
- Born: Ebenezer Pemberton; 1746 Newport, Colony of Rhode Island and Providence Plantations, British America
- Died: June 25, 1835 (aged 87–88) Boston, Massachusetts
- Resting place: Granary Burying Ground
- Spouse: Elizabeth Whitwell (m. 1796)
- Children: William Whitwell (bp. 1796); Mary Elizabeth Rebecca Royal (bp. 1797); Rebecca Royal (bp. 1797); Eudosia Caroline (bp. 1799); Samuel (bp. 1800); Joanna Eudosia (bp. 1805)
- Education: Princeton University (1765)

Ebenezer Pemberton (1746 – June 25, 1835) was an American educator and 2nd Principal (Note: The contemporary name for the position is Head of School.) of Phillips Academy Andover from 1786 to 1793. Refusing to follow his uncle's wishes to become a clergyman, Pemberton pursued a teaching career that would become his life's work. After graduating from Princeton University, he served terms as principal of a number of schools for early education including Plainfield Academy in Plainfield, Connecticut, Phillips Academy, and his own Pemberton Academy in Billerica, Massachusetts. He founded another school in 1810 in Boston, serving as principal there until poor health forced him to retire.

== Early life and family ==
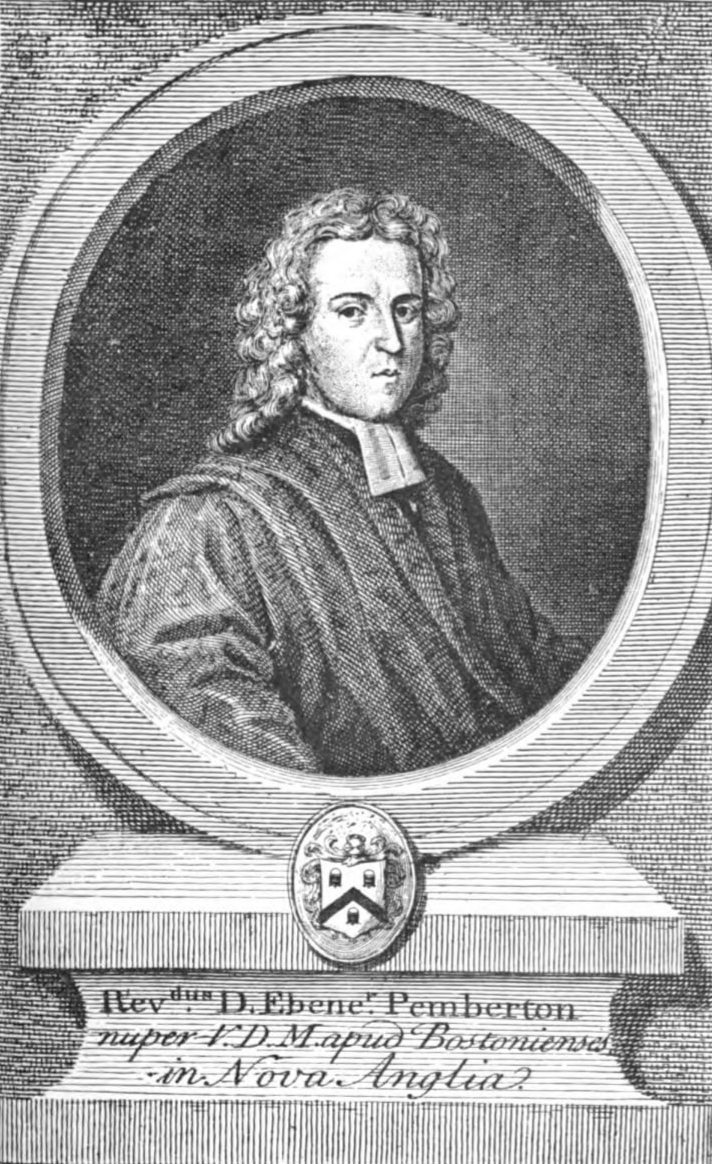
Rev. Ebenezer Pemberton, pastor of the Old South Church, grandfather of the subject.

Pemberton was born in Newport, Rhode Island, sometime in 1746 to Samuel Pemberton and Mary Frye Leach, daughter of Thomas Leach and Sarah Frye, and had three siblings:

1. Patrick Grant served in the Revolutionary War with the Connecticut Militia out of Preston, Connecticut. He was a private in Captain John William's company and Lieutenant Colonel Nathan Gallup's regiment and was stationed at Fort Griswold in 1779.
2. Joanna married Captain John Cady (Note: Captain John Cady (May 16, 1744 – November 28, 1783) was a ship captain, often making voyages down the Atlantic coast as well as out to Bermuda and the West Indies. On November 16, 1783, he made a trip to New York but on the return voyage was swept off by the boom during a storm on the 28th. He was alone at the helm and subsequently lost at sea.) July 8, 1779, in Plainfield, Connecticut. Originally living together in Plainfield, they moved to Norwich, Connecticut, for greater convenience for Capt. Cady's work as a ship captain. After his death Joanna returned to Plainfield for her two children's education and once they matured, she moved to New London, Connecticut, where she would spend the remainder of her life.
3. Mary died unmarried.

After Samuel Pemberton died, Mary Leach married Judge Lightfoot and had no children. From the age of seven, Pemberton grew up with his uncle, Rev. Ebenezer Pemberton, of Boston, pastor of Boston's New Brick Church and a founder of Princeton University and the Log College. His grandfather, also named Rev. Ebenezer Pemberton, was a minister of the Old South Church in Boston, which at the time resided in the Old South Meeting House. Consequently, due to his uncle's connections with the school, Pemberton attended Princeton University, then called the College of New Jersey, and graduated in 1765, valedictorian of his class. One Philadelphia newspaper reports Pemberton delivered an "elegant valedictory Oration on Patriotism."

== Career ==
=== Early years ===
After graduating from Princeton, Pemberton, from 1766 to 1769, taught at a Latin grammar school in Elizabethtown, New Jersey, and then for about a year returned to Princeton as a tutor, among his students Aaron Burr and James Madison. He then began studying theology under Rev. Samuel Hopkins in Newport. In 1771 while studying with Rev. Hopkins, he was "invited to keep the school", or in other words, invited to become a faculty member of Columbia University. He taught along with Jabez Denison, Ezra Stiles, and Charles Chauncy. Chauncy disliked Pemberton, describing him in a letter to Stiles:

"[Pemberton] is as thorow a fatalist, and bigot to the whole scheme connected w^{th} it, as Mṛ Hopkins. Dṛ Witherspoon has a sad time of it; as the New Jersey College is the foundation of their [theological] corruption."

Unlike Chauncy, Stiles favored Pemberton. He sent students from the charity school including his son Isaac to the Latin grammar school in Elizabethtown Pemberton now ran. Pemberton finished his studies with Rev. Hopkins with a license to preach in 1778. He decided not to become a clergyman or preach however, despite his uncle's wishes and as a result was forced to "rely on his own resources." Pemberton is described "from his physical sensibility and religious scruples could never be persuaded to preach." Pemberton also supposedly tried his hand at law, admitted to the Bar of Rhode Island in 1777, but equally disliked the practice as he did the clergy. This is unlikely, however, as Newport's economy was crippled and the population dispersed due to its occupation by the British in 1776.

In 1778, Pemberton moved to Plainfield, Connecticut, where his mother lived and became principal of Plainfield Academy (Note: Plainfield Academy, a secondary school founded in 1770. Originally purposed as a grammar school, its focus was quickly changed to providing a more complete preparatory education. In a brick school building constructed by the school's founders, instructors originally taught students at an early age English and later classics as the school grew. Students were prepared for higher education, often attending Yale College. In 1776, Isaac Coit Esq., a founder, left £250 for the school, with the hope to make the school available to more children, especially of the poor. By 1783, over 100 students enrolled. As the 19th century began, more schools began following the educational model of Plainfield Academy, increasing competition. Ultimately, this would lead to the school's demise. By 1818, only 80 students enrolled with an endowment totaling $834. Teachers were young, often not staying long with the desire to pursue other work. The Civil War made it even more difficult for the school to gain revenue and find qualified teachers. The school closed in 1890.) in Plainfield, Connecticut, a secondary school founded in 1770. He was successful in Plainfield and continued to tutor in Newport. He quit however, soon into his administration, to teach at a school in Windham, Connecticut. His success in Plainfield caught the attention of Judge Samuel Phillips, founder of Phillips Academy.

=== Phillips Academy ===
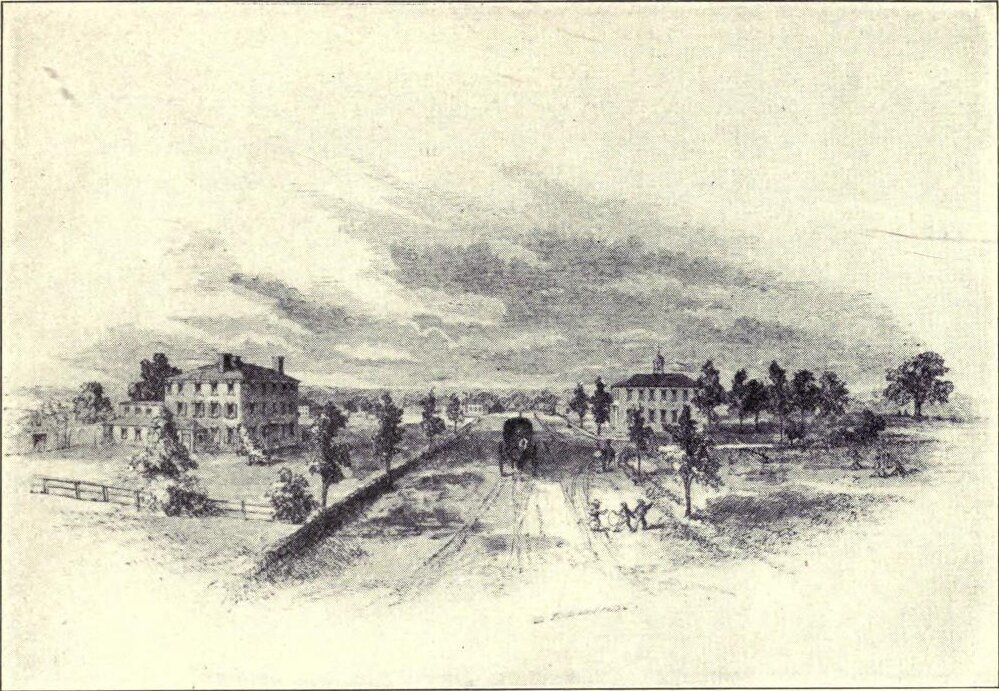
Phillips Academy c.1786

Phillips offered Pemberton a permanent role at Phillips Academy, but initially refused due to his relatively poor health. Once he was allowed the option to resign, he accepted, receiving a salary of £140, succeeding Eliphalet Pearson as the second Principal in 1786. Pemberton showed continuous success in Andover. He "maintained strict discipline" and ran the day's schedule "with perfect smoothness" while only using force as a last resort. One resolution voted by the Trustees on July 7, 1786, reads the following:

"Voted, that if any member of the Academy shall be guilty of profanity or any other scandalous immorality; for the first offense it shall be the duty of the principal to administer a serious reproof. In case of a second offense notice thereof is to be given by the principal to the parent or guardian of such youth; and upon the third offense notice thereof shall be given to the Trustees."

Caleb Strong, then Governor of Massachusetts, reported back to Judge Phillips: "My son's manners are much improved. He is a good deal mended of the trick of moving his feet and fingers." Pemberton also improved the curriculum, introducing courses in geography, higher levels of math, and public speaking. In 1786, former student Josiah Quincy III and current student John Thornton Kirkland, both future Presidents of Harvard University, orated the lines of Brutus and Cassius from Julius Caesar at an exhibition. The student body was healthy during Pemberton's administration. A total of 77 students in eight classes graduated to college, mostly to Harvard. Religious instruction was also of great importance to Pemberton and the school's Trustees. Students, as was regular at the time, often read passages from the Bible during class, engaged in related exercises Monday afternoons, and attended mass at the South Church down the street on Sundays. Judge Phillips was pleased with Pemberton's work, as he writes in a letter dated July 26, 1790, to John Phillips:

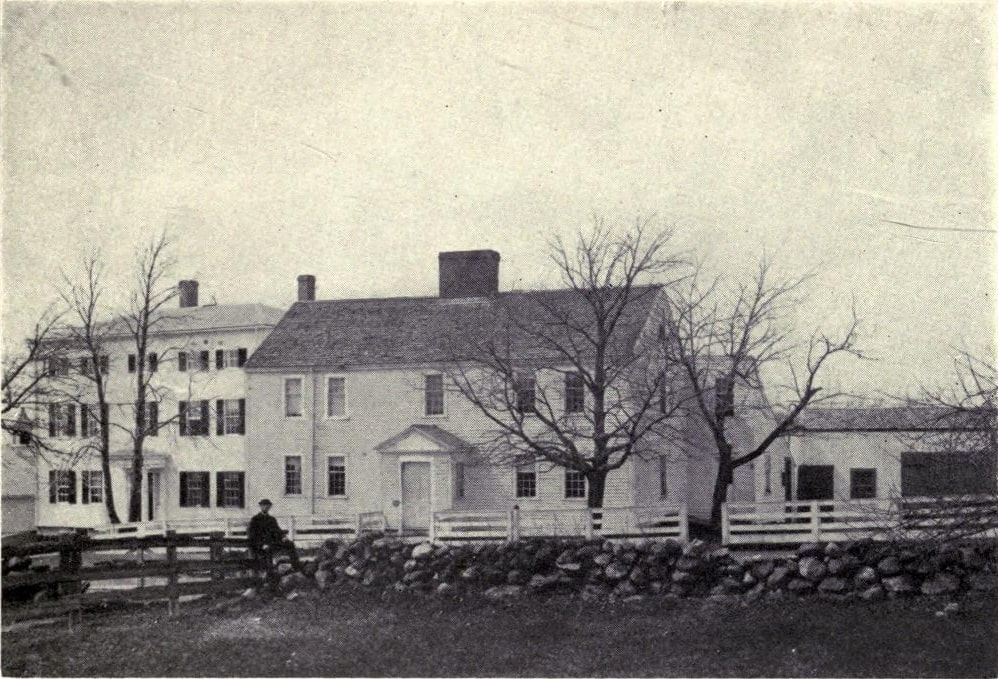
The Old Abbot House on Phillips Street, home of Ebenezer Pemberton while Principal 1786–1793.

"This Academy is in a more flourishing state than it has been for some time — its numbers before the vacation about 54 — twelve in the Sen'r class well fitted for college tho' but 7 have yet been offered for admission — the morals and deportment of the youths regular. The satisfaction to the Trustees, upon their examination, better than in some years past."

John Phillips, though primary founder of Phillips Exeter Academy, contributed to Phillips Academy in Andover over the years. One of his gifts included a sum of more than $20,000 in October 1789 in order to increase access of the school to students of poor families. In John Phillips' words, "for and in consideration of further promoting the virtuous and pious education of youth (poor children of genius, and of serious disposition especially)"

One of the most notable moments of Pemberton's administration was President George Washington's visit to Phillips Academy on November 5, 1789, during his tour of the Eastern States. He had spent the previous night in Deacon Isaac Abbot's Abbot Tavern on Elm Street and after breakfast at the tavern, was escorted by Judge Phillips and others to Central Street, past the South Church, up School Street, and south on Main Street where he was entertained at the Mansion House, Judge Phillips' residence, by him and his wife Phoebe Foxcroft Phillips. Phillips was already acquainted with Washington from the time Boston was under siege in 1775. That afternoon the President held an informal reception on what was then the training field, now the site of the Memorial Bell Tower.

In 1793, Pemberton began citing issues with his health that would compromise his ability as principal. He wrote a letter of resignation on October 9, 1793, which was delayed by the Trustees to December 24 with the hope his health might improve. They were reluctant to let go of Pemberton too soon, as he had only been principal for seven years and had been praised for his "ability, attention, and fidelity" as quoted from the Trustees themselves. Claude Fuess, 10th Headmaster of Phillips Academy, describes Pemberton in his history of the school in 1917 with the following lines from William Wordsworth's The Excursion:

"They, who were about him, did not fail In reverence, or in courtesy; they prized His gentle manners: and his peaceful smiles, The gleams of his slow-varying countenance, Were met with answering sympathy and love."

He would not, however, for much longer be praised by his contemporaries at Phillips Academy. They were surprised that, despite claiming poor health as the reason for resigning from Phillips Academy, he would become principal of a school in Billerica, Massachusetts the next year. According to Fuess, "everything indicates that he left Andover mainly because he had incurred the displeasure of Judge Phillips, probably because of some love affair which did not satisfy the Phillips family."

== Later life and death ==
In 1794, Pemberton relocated to Billerica, where he would establish Pemberton Academy and serve as its principal, suggesting he had not been in seriously ill health. By that time he had completely cut connections with Phillips Academy, a decision that was not taken favorably by his former colleagues. John Phillips, son of Judge Phillips, wrote in a letter to his mother Phoebe Foxcroft in 1796 regarding Pemberton:

"It seems as if Mr. Pemberton were determined to injure our family and the academy as much as possible. I suppose that he has now thoughts of making his office at Billerica hereditary."

Concurrent to his administration of his new academy, Pemberton served as Deacon of Billerica's First Church. He would remain principal in Billerica until 1810. When a group of Boston men pledged their support, he opened a small school in that city at 338 Washington Street for young children. Students learned reading, grammar, arithmetic, spelling, history, and geography. Pemberton moved his residence multiple times while in Boston. He first settled at the rear of 4 Newbury Street, the portion of Washington Street in between Essex and Summer Streets. Later he moved to Columbia Street and after that Essex Street and Hayward Place. He received similar praise by his students in Boston as he had while at Andover. One of his former students, General Henry K. Oliver, writes:

"A man he was of the most refined and graceful manners; dignified, yet courteous in demeanor, pleasant of speech, accurate in language, pure in thought and life, conscientious in all he said and did, presenting himself to my memory as a living model of a Christian gentleman and godly man."

In 1817, he was awarded with an honorary degree (LL.D.) from Allegheny College.

Eventually, Pemberton's poor health actually caught up to him, and in 1825, he was forced to quit his administrative role, handing responsibility of the Boston school to his two surviving daughters, Mary Elizabeth Rebecca Royal Pemberton and Joanna Evidosia Pemberton. He did not entirely quit teaching, however. One of their students, writer Ednah Dow Littlehale Cheney, recalls Pemberton teaching her how to read in 1830. According to her, Pemberton's favorite precept was, "Read slowly, and all other graces will follow." The school consisted of a court where the children would play, but noted, "No playful kindergarten was this school....Lessons were made to be learned, and the business of the child was to learn them by heart, though the heart had precious little to do with it." In 1830, she was one of five students attending the school.

Although Pemberton had much to his name early in his career, he retired without much wealth and relied on former students for annuity. He died June 25, 1835, at 5 Hayward Place, Boston at the age of 89. He was interred in the Granary Burying Ground.

== Legacy ==
While praised for his work and teaching abilities, he is criticized for his personality, especially towards Phillips Academy. Fuess concludes in his biography of Pemberton, "As Principal...he performed valuable service, but he was never fully praised during his period of labor, and his last days were a pathetic end for a life of sacrifice."

In his later life in Boston a portrait miniature was created of his likeness and later given by Marshall Shedd, husband of one of Pemberton's daughters, to William Morris Hunt to create a large scale painting for Phillips Academy. It was originally exhibited in Boston before gifted to the academy in 1878 along with portraits of other principals.

In 1914, a small dormitory on the Phillips Academy campus was renamed Pemberton Cottage in his honor. The building was constructed in 1891, completed in April 1893, and originally named Taylor Cottage, after Prof. John Phelps Taylor, until Taylor Hall was completed. The three-story, square-shaped red brick building features white trimmings and a white portico at its entrance with space for ten students and a teacher.

== Marriage and children ==
Pemberton married Elizabeth Whitwell, (Note: Two sources spell her surname "Whitewell" but three spell it "Whitwell") of Salem, daughter of Rev. William Whitwell and Prudence Hancock of Marblehead, on December 6, 1796 (Note: One source cites their marriage to have taken place on the fourth while two cite the sixth.) in Boston by Rev. Peter Thacher of the New North Church, now known as St. Stephen's Church. At the time of their marriage Pemberton was a principal in Billerica. Together they apparently had six children, two sons and four daughters.

1. William Whitwell (baptized (bp.) December 16, 1796 – 1850) died in Willsboro, New York.
2. Mary Elizabeth Rebecca Royal (bp. October 8, 1797) married Rev. Marshall Shedd (Note: One source cites the husband's name as William but this is unlikely.) (Note: Rev. Marshall S. Shedd (born "Marshall Shed")(August 9, 1786 – March 24, 1872), son of Zechariah Shed, was born in Cambridge, Massachusetts, although also spent time in Burlington, Vermont, and Waltham, Massachusetts, in his childhood. He graduated from Phillips Academy in 1813 and from Dartmouth College in 1817 as a member of the Phi Beta Kappa fraternity. He continued his training in the ministry with Rev. William Greenough, Rev. Jonathan Homer of Newton and Rev. Joshua Bates of Dedham. He was ordained pastor in 1820 in Acton, Massachusetts, where he remained until 1831. That year he became an acting pastor in Willsboro, New York, leaving temporarily in 1833 to Clinton, Massachusetts, and from 1835 to 1838 to Burlington, where he would remain in the ministry until his death. He married Eliza Thayer of Newton on April 16, 1818, prior to Mary Pemberton. He commissioned a portrait of his father-in-law for Phillips Academy. It was given posthumously at the school's centennial in 1878.) November 30, 1835, in Lincoln, Massachusetts. She took over responsibility of Pemberton's school in Boston in 1825 along with Joanna Evidosia (see below) after he could no longer do so himself. According to one account from one of her students Endah Dow Littlehale Cheney she was "a strict Calvinist who believed in responsibility and duty to the tips of her finger-nails."
3. Rebecca Royal (bp. October 8, 1797)
4. Eudosia Caroline (bp. November 3, 1799) died young.
5. Samuel (bp. December 11, 1800)
6. Joanna Eudosia (bp. April 14, 1805) was born in Billerica and maintained her father's school in Boston with Mary E. R. R. (see above) after 1825. According to the same account from Cheney, "Miss Joanna was more congenial [than her sister Mary] to the children."

Other sources say they only had three children, but it is possible that three was in the context of Pemberton's retirement, or in other words, he had three living children at the time of his retirement. Another source only lists five, missing Samuel.

== Bibliography ==
- Aiken, John; Frost, John (1838). Select Works of the British Poets: In A Chronological Series From Falconer to Sir Walter Scott. Philadelphia: Thomas Wardle.
- Allen, Orrin Peer (1910). Descendants of Nicholas Cady of Watertown, Mass. 1645–1910. Palmer, MA: Orrin Peer Allen.
- Bailey, Sarah Loring (1880). Historical Sketches of Andover, (comprising the present towns of North Andover and Andover). Boston: Houghton, Mifflin and Company.
- Burleigh, L. (January 1872). "History of Plainfield Academy". The Connecticut School Journal. 2 (1).
- Carpenter, Charles C. (1903). Biographical Catalogue of the Trustees, Teachers and Students of Phillips Academy Andover, 1778–1830. Andover, MA: The Andover Press.
- Cheney, Ednah Dow Littlehale (1902). Reminiscences of Ednah Dow Cheney (Born Littlehale). Boston: Lee & Shepard, Publishers.
- City of Boston (1903). A Volume of Records Relating to the Early History of Boston. Vol. 30. Boston: Municipal Printing Office.
- Colonial Society of Massachusetts (1918). Publications of the Colonial Society of Massachusetts. Vol. 19. Boston: Colonial Society of Massachusetts.
- Comstock, John Moore (1915). The Congregational Churches of Vermont and Their Ministry, 1762–1914 Historical and Statistical. St. Johnsbury, VT: The Caledonian Company.
- "Plainfield Academy: Grooming Connecticut Scholars in the 18th and 19th Centuries". Connecticut History.org. Connecticut Humanities. April 23, 2014. Archived from the original on December 21, 2018.
- Daughters of the American Revolution (1901). Lineage Book: National Society of the Daughters of the American Revolution. Vol. 13. Washington D.C.: Daughters of the American Revolution.
- Domingue, Robert A. (1990). "VIII: The Southeast Quadrant – The Athletic Area". Phillips Academy Andover, Massachusetts: An Illustrated History of the Property (Including Abbot Academy). Wilmington, MA: The Hampshire Press. ISBN 978-0962072628. Archived from the original on December 21, 2018.
- Empire State Society (1899). Register of the Empire State Society of the Sons of the American Revolution. New York: Empire State Society.<
- Fuess, Claude Moore (1917). An Old New England School: A History of Phillips Academy Andover. Boston: Houghton Mifflin Company.
- Gerould, Samuel L. (1880). The General Catalogue and a Brief History of Kimball Union Academy. Plainfield, NH: Kimball Union Academy.
- Granite Monthly, The (1883). The Granite Monthly. Vol. 6. Concord, NH: John M. McClintock.
- McLachlan, James (1976). Princetonians, 1748–1768: A Biographical Dictionary. Princeton, NJ: Princeton University Press. ISBN 9781400870776.
- Mott, Hopper Striker, ed. (1919). The New York Genealogical and Biographical Record. Vol. 50. New York: New York Genealogical and Biographical Society.
- New England Historic Genealogical Society (1892). The New England Historical and Genealogical Register. Vol. 46. Boston: New England Historic Genealogical Society.
- New England Historic Genealogical Society (1908a). Vital Records of Billerica, Massachusetts: To the Year 1850. Boston: New England Historic Genealogical Society.
- New England Historic Genealogical Society (1914). Vital Records of Cambridge, Massachusetts to the Year 1850. Boston: New England Historic Genealogical Society.
- New England Historic Genealogical Society (1908b). Vital Records of Lincoln, Massachusetts: To the Year 1850. Boston: New England Historic Genealogical Society.
- New England Journal of Education (May 23, 1878). "Massachusetts". New England Journal of Education. 7 (21). Boston.
- Phi Beta Kappa Society (1838). Catalogue of the Fraternity of ФВК, Alpha of New Hampshire, Dartmouth College, New Hampshire. Concord, NH: Phi Beta Kappa Society.
- Shipton, Clifford Kenyon; Sibley, John Langdon (1972). Sibley's Harvard Graduates: Biographical Sketches of Those Who Attended Harvard College in the Classes of 1764–1767. Vol. 16. Boston: Massachusetts Historical Society.
- Smith, Jerry (2000). "Descendants of James Pemberton". The Murray/Smith Genealogy Page. Jerry Smith. Archived from the original on December 23, 2018.
- Trustees of Phillips Academy. "John Palfrey P'21". Andover. Trustees of Phillips Academy. Archived from the original on November 26, 2018.

Academic offices
Preceded by Eliphalet Pearson	Principal of Phillips Academy; 1786–1793	Succeeded by Mark Newman
