= Joe Hoague =

American football player (1918–1991)

No. 17, 21
- Positions: Fullback, halfback

Personal information
- Born: February 18, 1918; Brookline, Massachusetts, U.S.
- Died: January 4, 1991 (aged 72); Lakeville, Massachusetts, U.S.
- Listed height: 6 ft 2 in (1.88 m)
- Listed weight: 203 lb (92 kg)

Career information
- High school: The Governor's Academy (Byfield, Massachusetts)
- College: Colgate
- NFL draft: 1941: 13th round, 111th overall pick

Career history
- Pittsburgh Steelers (1941–1942); Philadelphia-Pittsburgh Steagles (1943); Boston Yanks (1946)

Career NFL statistics
- Rushing yards: 282
- Rushing average: 2.8
- Receptions: 3
- Receiving yards: 25
- Total touchdowns: 3
- Stats at Pro Football Reference

Joseph Daniell Hoague (February 18, 1918 – January 4, 1991) was an American professional football player in the National Football League (NFL) with the Pittsburgh Steelers and later the Philadelphia-Pittsburgh Steagles and Boston Yanks. Before joining the NFL, Hoague played college football at Colgate University.

== Early life ==
Hoague began his athletic career while attending The Governor's Academy, the oldest boarding school in the United States. There, he played five varsity sports and served as the baseball team captain in his senior year. In his junior year, Hoague played football, hockey, and baseball; as a senior, he competed in football, basketball, winter track, and baseball. While at the school he was also awarded the Academy’s most honored prize, the Morse Flag, for earning the highest respect of the faculty.

== College career ==
Hoague graduated in 1937, and so afterward attended Colgate University. At Colgate, he was a three-year letterman and honorable All-American. He was inducted into the Colgate University Hall of Honor in 1990.

== Professional career ==
After college, he was drafted by the Philadelphia Eagles in the 13th round (111th overall) of the 1941 NFL draft. His rights were transferred to the Pittsburgh Steelers due to the events later referred to as the Pennsylvania Polka. He played in two seasons with the Steelers. However, he was later called up to fight in World War II. He was drafted into the United States Navy and was out of football until 1946, when he played one last season with the Boston Yanks. However, before he left for the Navy, Steagles coach Walt Kiesling placed Hoague in the line-up one last time in a game against the Chicago Bears.

== Coaching career ==
In 1980, Hoague was named to the National High School Association Hall of Fame for his dedication to coaching football at Melrose High School in Melrose, Massachusetts. As a high school football coach at Melrose, Natick, and Taunton High Schools, Hoague achieved a combined record of 200 victories. He was also recognized by his induction into the Massachusetts Football Coaches Hall of Fame.
