= Samuel Webber =

President of Harvard University

The Reverend Samuel Webber

President of Harvard University
- In office 1804–1810
- Preceded by: Eliphalet Pearson acting
- Succeeded by: John Thornton Kirkland

Personal details
- Born: 1759 Byfield, Province of Massachusetts Bay
- Died: July 17, 1810 (aged 50–51) Cambridge, Massachusetts

Samuel Webber (1759 – July 17, 1810) was an American Congregational clergyman, mathematician, academic, and the 13th president of Harvard University from 1806 until his death in 1810.

== Biography ==
Webber was born in Byfield, Massachusetts, in 1759. He was educated at Dummer Academy (now known as The Governor's Academy) and Harvard College (B.A., 1784; M.A., 1787) where he distinguished himself in mathematics. He was a member of the Hasty Pudding. Webber was ordained as Congregational minister in 1787 and two years later became Hollis Professor of Mathematick and Natural Philosophy at Harvard. He served in the commission that drew the boundaries, later recognized by the Treaty of Paris, between the new United States of America and the surrounding British provinces. He was elected a Fellow of the American Academy of Arts and Sciences in 1789 and also served as vice-president of the Academy. He authored System of Mathematics, which for many years served as the only textbook on the subject in New England.

Webber was appointed president of Harvard in 1806. That same year he received an honorary Doctor of Divinity degree from that institution. He led Harvard until his death in Cambridge, Massachusetts on July 17, 1810.

== Family ==
Webber's son, Samuel Jr., married Anna Winslow Green, a granddaughter of David Mathews, Loyalist Mayor of New York City under the British during the American Revolution. Webber's son, also named Samuel (September 15, 1797 Cambridge, Massachusetts – December 5, 1880 Charlestown, New Hampshire), was a distinguished physician, chemist and author.

== Works ==
- “Introduction” to Jedidiah Morse, American Universal Geography, 1796 (revision)
- System of Mathematics, (2 vols.), 1801
- Eulogy on President Willard, 1804

Academic offices
Preceded by Eliphalet Pearson, acting	President of Harvard University; 1806–1810	Succeeded by John Thornton Kirkland
Preceded by Samuel Williams	Hollis Chair of Mathematics and Natural Philosophy; 1789-1806	Succeeded by John Farrar
