= The Governor's Academy =

Prep school in Byfield, Massachusetts, US

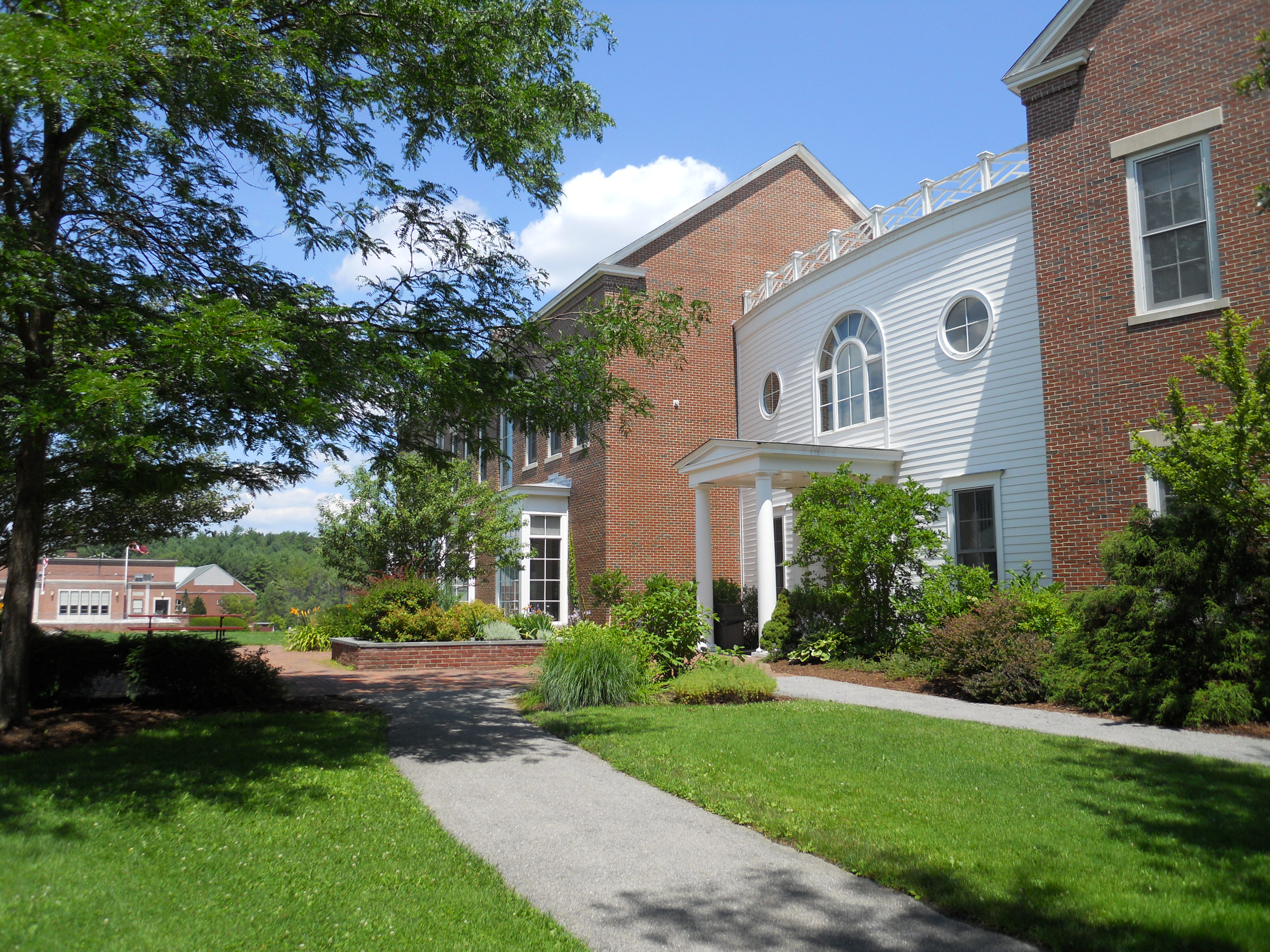

Location
- 1 Elm Street; Byfield, Massachusetts 01922; United States
- 42°45′00″N 70°53′54″W

Information
- Former name: Governor Dummer Academy
- Type: Private, boarding
- Motto: Non sibi sed aliis (Not for self, but for others)
- Established: 1763; 263 years ago
- Headmaster: Peter H. Quimby, PhD
- Enrollment: 415
- Average class size: 12
- Student to teacher ratio: 5:1
- Campus size: 456 acres (1.85 km^{2})
- Colors: Cardinal and white
- Athletics conference: Independent School League
- Mascot: The Governor
- Rival: Brooks School
- Endowment: $87 million
- Tuition: Boarding: $72,900, Day: $58,025 in 2022–2024
- Website: thegovernorsacademy.org

The Governor's Academy (informally known as Governor's or Govs) is a co-educational, college-preparatory day and boarding school in Byfield, Massachusetts. Established in 1763 in memory of Massachusetts governor William Dummer, Governor's is the oldest boarding school in New England.

Governor's educates approximately 400 students in grades 9–12, roughly 60% of whom live on campus. Its campus covers 456 acres (1.85 km^{2}) and is 33 miles (53 km) north of Boston.

== History ==
=== Foundation ===
In 1763, the Dummer Charity School was founded in memory of William Dummer (d. 1761), who served as the acting governor of Massachusetts from 1723 to 1728. A widower with no children, Dummer bequeathed his family farm in Byfield, Massachusetts to Charles Chauncy, Thomas Foxcroft, and Nathaniel Dummer with instructions to establish a "Free Grammar School." The school opened in March 1763 with 28 boys and Samuel Moody as the first preceptor (headmaster). Byfield residents attended the school for free until 1837.

Governor's is the oldest boarding school in New England and the third-oldest boarding school in the United States, after Maryland's West Nottingham Academy and Pennsylvania's Linden Hall. At times, the academy has billed itself as the oldest continuously operating boarding school in the United States. However, it temporarily shut down several times, including in 1790 and 1819.

=== A new trend in secondary education ===
Dummer School was founded to prepare students for college. Although William Dummer was not a college graduate, his brother Jeremiah attended Harvard and provided important early support to Yale. William foresaw a need for college-preparatory schools in outlying areas, particularly in Essex County; most prep schools at the time were concentrated near Boston. Under Moody, two-thirds of Dummer students commuted to campus from nearby communities.

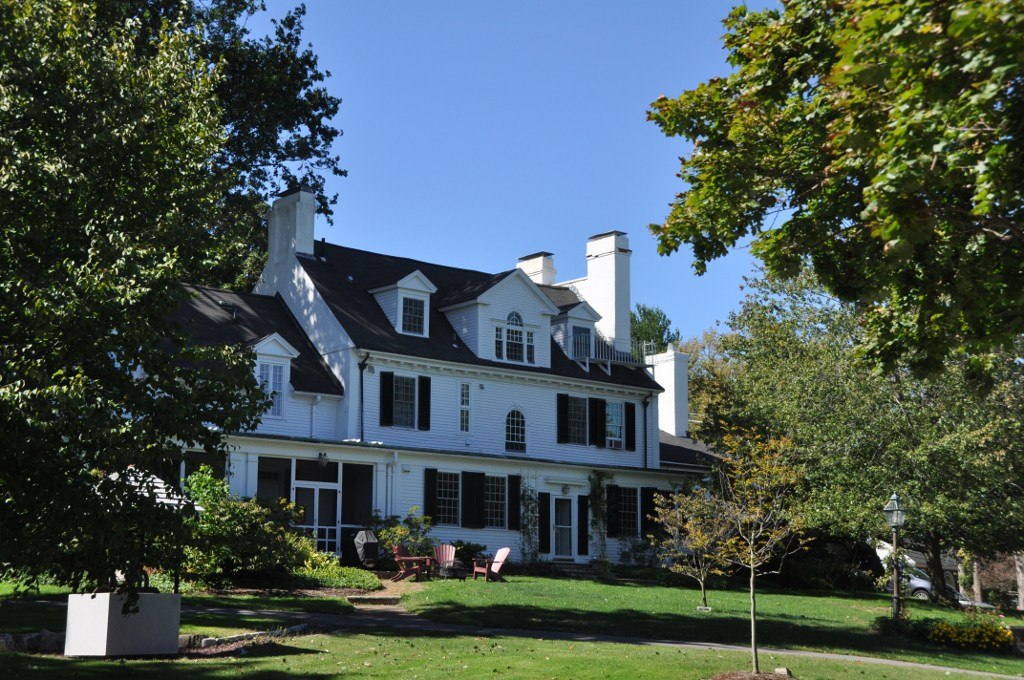
Mansion House, formerly the residence of William Dummer

However, the more historically notable aspect of Dummer School was its boarding program. For the first 15 years of Dummer School's existence, it was the only boarding school in Massachusetts. It was "the first school of its kind in America" to operate on-campus residential facilities for boarders, who comprised the remaining one-third of the student body and lived in Governor Dummer's old mansion. (Today, "Mansion House" serves as the headmaster's residence and plays a regular role in student life.)

The curriculum focused on instruction in Latin, Greek, and the classics, with supplemental teaching in sacred studies, basic math, and English. Universities considered classical studies integral preparation for college until the turn of the twentieth century. From 1768 to 1790 (when Moody retired), the Dummer School educated 128 (25.5%) of Harvard's 501 graduates.

The Dummer School lost its monopoly on both Essex County and Massachusetts in 1778, when Dummer alumnus Samuel Phillips founded Phillips Academy in Andover. The Phillips Academy historian wrote that Phillips wanted to found a more distinctly sectarian (Calvinist) institution, in contrast to Dummer, where religion was not "a central part" of student life.

In October 1782, the school received a corporate charter, which renamed the institution to Dummer Academy. (The academy formally adopted the name Governor Dummer Academy in 1950.) During the early republican era, the term "academy" typically signaled an institution's intention to broaden the academic curriculum beyond Latin and Greek. However, Dummer Academy did not formally establish a non-classical course of study until 1837, and the director of the "English Department" resigned in 1842.

=== Development ===
To help raise money, an alumni association was established in 1822. Henry Durant (p. 1849–52) ran the school for two (according to the school historian, unsuccessful) years, after which he moved to California and founded the University of California.

By the time of the school's centennial in 1863, the Dummer Academy had grown into a well known 19th-century prep school that catered mostly to children from affluent families who aspired to the Ivy League. By the turn of the 20th century, however, the school had fallen on hard times, with enrollment and income down, as the school struggled under the shadow of Andover and Exeter, and other schools that had grown to become very well known and prestigious.

In 1908, Dr. Charles Ingham became headmaster and launched great efforts to revive the academy. As a result, Dummer Academy became stabilized and began to again thrive as a premier New England prep school that sent over a third of its graduates to Ivy League colleges during that period. Upon Dr. Ingham's retirement in 1930, Edward "Ted" Eames became headmaster, a post he held for 30 years.

With limited exceptions, the school educated only boys until 1972.

In December 2005, the board of trustees voted to change the business name of the academy to The Governor's Academy (its legal name remains Governor Dummer Academy). A marketing company had found that the name "Dummer" was deterring prospective students from applying. According to the Washington Post, the school's name was frequently "fodder for all manner of insulting puns." Some students and alumni resisted the change, questioning why the academy should let "shallow" teenage jokes supersede tradition.

From 2017 to 2024, Governor's has been conducting a large-scale fundraising campaign, which seeks to raise $100 million, including $23 million to support financial aid.

== Notable alumni ==
- Wentworth Cheswill (1765), the first African American elected to public office in the United States
- Theophilus Parsons (1765), Chief Justice of Massachusetts
- Eliphalet Pearson (1769), first headmaster of Phillips Academy Andover, interim President of Harvard University, 1804-1806
- Samuel Phillips, Jr. (1771), founder of Phillips Andover
- Samuel Tenney, scholar, judge, physician/surgeon who treated wounded at the Battle of Bunker Hill, attached to the 1st Rhode Island Regiment, encamped at Valley Forge, PA, designated acting Surgeon General of the Army by General Washington, delegate to New Hampshire's Constitutional Convention, U.S. congressman
- Samuel Sewall (congressman) (1772), U.S. congressman, Chief Justice of Massachusetts
- Rufus King (1773) delegate to Constitutional Convention, United States Senator and 1816 Federalist candidate for President
- Samuel Osgood (1776), first U.S. Postmaster, Speaker New York State Assembly; first President, City Bank of New York
- Edward Preble (1776), U.S. Naval officer during Revolutionary War and thereafter, commanded USS Constitution during war with Barbary Pirates
- Tobias Lear (1779), personal secretary to George Washington
- Benjamin Pickman, Jr. (1780), Massachusetts state legislator, U.S. congressman
- Sir David Ochterlony, American "Tory" officer in the British Army who served in India from 1777 until his death in 1825, rising to the rank of general while helping to consolidate British colonial rule there
- Joseph Willard, President of Harvard University (1781–1804)
- Samuel Webber, President of Harvard University (1806–1810)
- Parker Cleaveland (1795), professor of mineralogy at Bowdoin College, leading early American authority on this subject, known as the "Father of American Mineralogy"
- Frederick W. Lander, Brig. Gen. USA, killed in action during the Civil War
- Reuben D. Mussey, Jr. (1846), Brig. Gen. USA, later private secretary to President Andrew Johnson, professor at Howard University Law School; he married Ellen Spencer Mussey, who became one of the first female attorneys in the District of Columbia and who was leading suffragist. She also became a founder of the Washington College of Law.
- John W. Candler, member of Congress from Massachusetts during the 1880s
- Benjamin Perley Poore, journalist, newspaper editor and founder of the Gridiron Club
- Yu Kil-chun, Korean reformist and the first Korean to study in the West, entered the school in 1884
- Frank Crowe (1901), civil engineer and dam builder (Hoover Dam, Shasta Dam)
- David Caldwell (1909), Member of the 1912 United States Olympic Track Team
- William Summer Johnson (1932), professor of chemistry at Stanford who was awarded the National Medal of Science
- Benjamin A. Smith II (1935), U.S. senator from Massachusetts, 1960–62
- Joe Hoague (1937), professional football player, Pittsburgh Steelers
- Ted Bergmann, American TV and film producer and screenwriter
- Niles Perkins (1938), athlete and physician
- Dodge Morgan (1950), the first American to sail solo around the globe with no stops (1986)
- Michael Stonebraker (1961) Receiver of the ACM Turing Award also referred to as the "Nobel Prize of Computing"
- Jeb Bradley (1970), U.S. congressman, 2003–2007; New Hampshire state senator 2009-
- Steve Bucknall (1985), professional basketball player, Los Angeles Lakers
- Carrie Walton Penner (1988), Walton Family, Charter School Growth Fund
- Dan Gadzuric (1998), professional basketball player, Golden State Warriors
- Nat Baldwin (1999), bassist and singer, member of Dirty Projectors
- Song, Chang-il (2000), known by his stage name Double K, a South Korean rapper
- Derek Falvey (2001), Executive Vice President and Chief Baseball Officer for the Minnesota Twins of Major League Baseball (MLB)
- Didit Hediprasetyo (2001), fashion designer
- Benn Ferriero (2004), former professional ice hockey player for the San Jose Sharks
- Robert Francois (2004), professional football player, Minnesota Vikings, Detroit Lions, Green Bay Packers, Super Bowl champion 2010-11
- Alex Carpenter (2011), Olympic women's ice hockey player
- Duncan Robinson (2012), professional basketball player, Detroit Pistons
- Jake Picking (2010), American actor
- Matt Peart (2015), professional football player for the New York Giants of the NFL
- Shane Smith, baseball player
