= Stephen H. Willard =

American photographer and painter

- Born: Stephen Hallet Willard; March 8, 1894; Earlville, Illinois, U.S.
- Died: 1966 (aged 71–72); Owens Valley, California, U.S.
- Occupations: Painter; photographer
- Spouse: Beatrice Armstrong (m. 1921)
- Children: Beatrice Willard

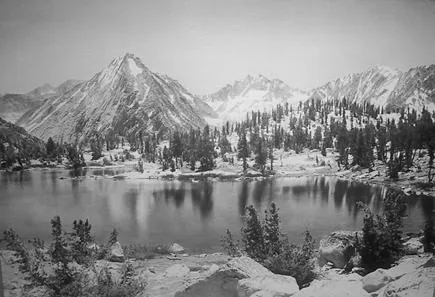
Bullfrog Lake, 1915, by Willard

Stephen Hallet Willard (March 8, 1894–1966) was an American painter and photographer who produced many images of Western scenery, especially desert views. Willard later published many of these same images as linen postcards, printed by Curt Teich. He photographed the deserts and mountains of the West for 58 years. He also pioneered the art of tinting photographs with oil paint.

Willard was born in Earlville, Illinois, but moved to Corona, California when he was two years old. He got his first camera when he turned 14, and won his first photography competition when he was 18.

In 1918, Willard joined the Army as a photographer. He served as a photographer in the 8th Infantry Division in France, taking photographs that were turned into postcards for the troops. He returned to the United States and left the Army in 1919, moving to Palm Springs. He met and married Beatrice Armstrong, in 1921. In 1925 their daughter Beatrice Willard was born, she would become a noted American botanical researcher specializing in high alpine and arctic tundra.

He opened a photography studio and gallery in Palm Springs in 1922. He opened a gallery in Mammoth Lakes in 1924. He built a home and studio in Palm Springs in 1935. He spent more than 20 years taking photographs of the Colorado and Mojave Desert in the winter and the Eastern Sierra in the summer.

In 1936, Minerva Hamilton Hoyt enlisted Willard to take photographs of parts of the Mojave Desert. Hoyt then used these photographs as part of a successful argument to Franklin Delano Roosevelt to create Joshua Tree National Monument. Willard's photographs of the California deserts were also important in enlarging Death Valley National Park.

In 1947, Willard found Palm Springs to be too crowded, thus sold his Palm Springs home to Patricia and Chester Moorten who would develop the property into the Moorten Botanical Gardens. Willard then spent his time at the gallery in Mammoth. He died in 1966 in the Owens Valley.

Willards daughter Beatrice donated a large set of Willard's artwork and equipment to the Palm Springs Art Museum in 1999.
