= Descendants of Simon Willard =

Family tree

Simon Willard (1605–1676) family:

== Selected lineage ==
The following selected lineage is primarily paternal, hence the same surnames. Note that, with respect to traversal (breadth and depth), the tree does not aim for comprehensiveness in terms to breadth.

Simon Willett (1510–1598) & Elizabeth (1572–1608)
Richard Willard (1583–1616) & Margery Humphrie (1572–1608)	With Richard's 2nd wife, Joan Moorebread (1585–1616)
Simon Willard (1605–1676) & Mary Sharpe (1614–1650)	With Simon's 3rd wife → Mary Dunster (1630–1715)	Rev. Richard Willard (1615–1640) & Elizabeth Abell (1619–1655)
Samuel Willard (1640–1707) & Abigail Mary Sherman (1647–1679) son, et ux.	Josiah Willard (1635–1674) & Hannah Hosmer (1639– btw 1689 & 1692) son, et ux.	Henry Willard (1655–1726) & Mary Lakin (1658–1688) son, et ux.	With Henry's 2nd wife → Dorcas Cutler (1675–1747) son, et ux.	John Willard (1656–1726) & Mary Hayward (1677–1729) son, et ux.	Benjamin Willard (1664–1732) & Sarah Larkin (1661–1740) son, et ux.	Jonathan Willard (1669–1705) & Mary Brown (1668–1720) son, et ux.
John Willard (1673–1741) & Frances Sherburne (1673–1733) grandson, et ux.	Samuel Willard (1658–1716) & Sarah Clark (1662–1723) grandson, et ux.	Simon Willard (1664–1726) & Mary Gilbert (1670–1712) grandson, et ux.	Henry Willard (1675–1827) & Abigail Temple (1677–1810) grandson, et ux.	With Henry's 2nd wife → Sarah Nutting (1681–1781) grandson, et ux.	Simon Willard (1678–1706) & Mary Whitcomb (1676–1727) grandson, et ux.	Joseph Willard (1685–1761) & Elizabeth Tarbell (1691–1763) grandson, et ux.	Jonathan Willard (1695–1760) & Keziah White (1696–1739) grandson, et ux.	Josiah Willard (1693–1750) & Hannah Wilder (1690–1766) grandson, et ux.	Simon Willard (1706–1766) & Zeruiah Nash (1713–1800) grandson, et ux.	Joseph Willard (1693–1774) & Mary Clarke (1693–1774) grandson, et ux.	Jonathan Willard II (1693–1731) & Elizabeth Whitney (1691–1728) grandson, et ux.
Samuel Willard (1705–1741) & Abigail Wright (1707–1785) great-grandson, et ux.	Samuel Willard (1693–1779) & Sarah Stillman (1694–1774) great-grandson, et ux.	Josiah Willard (1691–1757) & Mary Goodall (1695–1750) great-grandson, et ux.	John Mears Willard (1694–1762) & Margaret Smith (1699–1785) great-grandson, et ux.	Abraham Willard (1699–1731) & Mary Sawyer (1704–1835) great-grandson, et ux.	William Willard (1713–1813) & Sarah Gates (1716–1813) great-grandson, et ux.	Moses Willard (1702–1756) & Susan Hastings (1710–1797) great-grandson, et ux.	Moses Willard (1703–1774) & Abigail Fairbanks (1708–1748) great-grandson, et ux.	William Willard (1713–1797) & Ellen Davis (1715–1796) great-grandson, et ux.	Jonathan Willard (1721–1799) & Phebe Ballard (1724–1758) great-grandson, et ux.	Oliver Willard (1729–1810) & Thankful Doolittle (1733–1798) great-grandson, et ux.	Lewis Willard (1749–1828) & Dorcas (1749–1816) great-grandson, et ux.	Benjamin Willard (1716–1775) & Sarah Brooks (1717–1775) great-grandson, et ux.	Josiah Willard (1732–1815) & Dinah Howe (1731–1796) great-grandson, et ux.	Isaac Willard (1724–1805) & Sarah Whipple (1729–1768) great-grandson, et ux.	Jonathan Willard (twin: 1720–1799) & Elizabeth Elder (1722–??) great-grandson, et ux.
William Willard (1735–1810) & Catherine Wilder (1742–1828); 2nd great-grandson, et ux.	Joseph Willard (1738–1804) & Mary Sheafe (1753–1826); 2nd great-grandson, et ux.	Samuel Willard (1715–1786) & Saray Lynde (1718–1786); 2nd great-grandson, et ux.	John Willard (1722–1767) & Mary Horton (1728–1807); 2nd great-grandson, et ux.	Elias Willard (1727–1794) & Anne Stanley (1728–1798); 2nd great-grandson, et ux.	Abraham Willard (1726–1758) & Mary Haskell (1724–1754); 2nd great-grandson, et ux.	William Willard (1737–1786) & Mary Whittemore (1738–1801); 2nd great-grandson, et ux.	Susannah Willard Johnson (née Willard; 1729–1818); 2nd great-granddaughter, et ux.	James Nutting Willard (1734–1818) & Abigail Whetherbe (1735–1814); 2nd great-grandson, et ux.	John Willard (1739–1793) & Sarah Wilder (1735–1814); 2nd great-grandson, et ux.	Barzillai Willard (1750–1831) & Sylvia Kingman (1754–1845); 2nd great-grandson, et ux.	Jonathan Willard (1745–1832) & Elizabeth Caswell (1749–1781); 2nd great-grandson, et ux.	Titus Willard (1764–1798) & Leah Antisdale (1776–1851); 2nd great-grandson, et ux.	Anson Willard (1786–1850) & Lucretia Henrietta Baker (1792–1885); 2nd great-grandson, et ux.	Simon Willard (1753–1848); 2nd great-grandson	Benjamin Willard (1743–1803); 2nd great-grandson	Ephraim Willard (1755–1832); 2nd great-grandson	Aaron Willard (1757–1844); 2nd great-grandson	Francis Willard (1774–1885) & Sally Northrop (1778–1851); 2nd great-grandson, et ux.	Solomon Willard (1755–1808) & Lydia Johnson (1755–1830); 2nd great-grandson, et ux.	John Willard (1746–1781) & Lucy Davis (1746–??); 2nd great-grandson, et ux.
Solomon Willard (1783–1861); 3rd great-grandson	Sidney Willard (1780–1856); 3rd great-grandson	Joseph Willard (1750–1832) & Rachel Reeves (1747–1829); 3rd great-grandson, et ux.	Julius Alphon Willard (1754–1824) & Sarah Parker (1756–1826); 3rd great-grandson, et ux.	John Willard (1759–1825) & Emma Willard (1787-1870); 3rd great-grandson	John Willard (1760–1834) & Abigail Hall; 3rd great-grandson, et ux.	Elijah Willard (1751–1839) & Mary Atherton (1853–1794); 3rd great-grandson, et ux.	Isaac Willard (1776–1809) & Sarah Goodrich (1774–1855); 3rd great-grandson, et ux.	John Small Willard (1771–1852) & Nancy West (1770–1845); 3rd great-grandson, et ux.	Elijah Willard (1782–1852) & Thankful Gross (1788–1872); 3rd great-grandson, et ux.	Lewis Willard (1782–1851) & Mary Moulton (1776–1859); 3rd great-grandson, et ux.	Alexander Hamilton Willard (1777–1865); 3rd great-grandson	Allen Hays Willard (1794–1876) & Eliza Barron (1796–1838); 3rd great-grandson, et ux.	Victor Mauro Willard (1813–1869); 3rd great-grandson	Joseph Allen Willard (1803–1868); 3rd great-grandson	Solomon Willard (1784–1864) & Mercy Otis (1791–1858); 3rd great-grandson, et ux.	Erza John Willard (1779–1847) & Sarah Putnam (1779–1811); 3rd great-grandson, et ux.
Nathan Sylvester Willard (1788–1827) & Mary Wharry (1785–1843); 4th great-grandson, et ux.	John Willard (1792–1862); 4th great-grandson	John Willard, Jr. (1790–1857) & Polly Buck (1794–1881); 4th great-grandson, et ux.	Oliver Atherton Willard (1784–1826) & Catherine Lewis (1779–1856); 4th great-grandson, et ux.	Stedman Willard (1798–1877) & Meriel Wheeler (1802–1837); 4th great-grandson, et ux.	James Nutting Willard (1796–1868) & Maria White (1793–1869); 4th great-grandson, et ux.	Elijah Willard, Jr. (1816–1894) & Mary T. Donovan (18263–1894); 4th great-grandson, et ux.	Josiah M. Willard (1815–1885) & Caroline Noble (1814–??); 4th great-grandson, et ux.	George R. Willard (1824–1901); 4th great-grandson	Otis Willard (1807–1893) & Jerusha Ellis (1807–1868); 4th great-grandson, et ux.	Luman Willard (1811–1849) & Emily Bacon (1816–??); 4th great-grandson, et ux.
Xerxes Addison Willard (1820–1882) & Harriet L. Hallett (1822–1904); 5th great-grandson, et ux.	Horace Birney Willard (1825–1900); 5th great-grandson	Josiah Flint Willard (1805–1868) & Mary Thompson Hill (1805–1892); 5th great-grandson, et ux.	Isaac Willard (1832–1911) & Mary Ann Searle (1837–1905); 5th great-grandson, et ux.	Daniel Spalding Willard (1832–1905) & Mary Ann Daniels (1834–1866); 5th great-grandson, et ux.	Cyrus Field Willard (1858–1942); 5th great-grandson, et ux.	Roscoe Mellen Willard (1845–1897) & Frances Alice Cushing (1849–1911); 5th great-grandson, et ux.	Martin Louis Willard (1842–1921); 5th great-grandson	Myron B. Willard (1844–1881) & Margaret Belle Bailey (1850–1908); 5th great-grandson, et ux.
Stephen S. Willard (1858–1928) & Elizabeth Sophia Park (1862–1912); 6th great-grandson, et ux.	Frances Elizabeth Caroline Willard (1839–1898); 6th great-granddaughter	Joseph Moody Willard (1865–1923) & Henrietta Norris Nunn (1871–1957); 6th great-grandson, et ux.	Daniel Willard (1861–1942); 6th great-grandson	Frederick Roscoe Willard (1877–1948) & Emily Francesca Skerry (1885–??); 6th great-grandson, et ux.	Jess Myron Willard (1881–1968); 6th great-grandson
Stephen Hallett Willard (1894–1966) & Beatrice Armstrong (1896–1977); 7th great-granddaughter, et ux.	Mary Louisa Willard (1898–1993); 7th great-granddaughter	Sumner Willard (1916–1995) & Charity Ellen Cannon (1914–2005); 7th great-grandson, et ux.
Beatrice Elizabeth Willard (1925–2003); 8th great-granddaughter

== See also ==
- Willard InterContinental Washington, established just prior to the Civil War by Henry "Harry" C. Augustus Willard (1822–1909), 5th great-grandson (8th generation descendant) of Simon Willard.
- Archibald MacNeal Willard (1838–1918), American painter, 5th great-grandson (8th generation descendant) of Simon Willard
- Ashbel Parsons Willard (1820–1860), Indiana state senator, 12th Indiana Lieutenant Governor, and 11th Indiana Governor, 3rd great-grandson (6th generation descendant) of Simon Willard

== Bibliography ==
=== References linked to notes ===
- Cutter, William Richard (1847–1918) (1908). Genealogical and Personal Memoirs Relating to the Families of Boston and Eastern Massachusetts. Vol. 4 Vols. New York: Lewis Historical Publishing Company – via Internet Archive. LCCN 09-11679; OCLC 773491794 (all editions), 1048563780, 866126365, 1102307290.
- Cutter, William Richard (1847–1918) (1912). Genealogical and Family History of Central New York: A Record of the Achievements of Her People in the Making of a Commonwealth and the Building of a Nation. Vol. 1 (of 3). New York: Lewis Historical Publishing Company – via Internet Archive. LCCN 12-13659; OCLC 576681 (all editions).
- Pierce, Frederick Clifton (1855–1904) (1895). The Descendants of John Whitney, Who Came from London, England, to Watertown, Massachusetts, in 1635. Chicago: Published by the Author. Printed by W.B. Conkey Company → founded by Walter Blakeslee Conkey (1858–1923) – via Internet Archive. LCCN 09-18749; OCLC 1189682446 (all editions) & 3715819.
1. "Elizabeth [Whitney]". Chicago, The author, press of W. B. Conkey co. 1895. p. 34.
- Pope, Charles Henry (1841–1918), ed. (1915). Willard Genealogy – Sequel to Willard Memoir. Boston: The Willard Family Association. p. 280 – via Google Books. Materials gathered chiefly by Joseph Willard (1798–1865) and Charles Wilkes Walker (1849–1927). LCCN 15-27575; OCLC 36164693 (all editions).
5th generation:
1. "Susanna [Willard Johnson]". p. 52.
2. "Benjamin Willard". pp. 137–138.
3. "Simon Willard". pp. 139–140.
4. "Ephraim Willard". p. 140.
5. "Aaron Willard". pp. 140–141.
6. "James Nutting [Willard]". p. 212.
6th generation:
7. "Solomon [Willard]". p. 92.
7th generation:
8. "George Willard". p. 415.
8th generation:
9. "Horace Birney [Willard]". p. 307.
10. "Cyrus Field [Willard]". p. 645.
11. "Martin Louis [Willard]". p. 422.
12. "Martin Louis Willard". p. 560.
13. "Henry Augustus Willard". p. 453.
14. "Cyrus Field [Willard]". p. 493.
15. "Josiah Flint Willard". pp. 493–494.
9th generation:
16. "Frances Elizabeth [Caroline] Willard". pp. 494–495.
17. "Daniel Willard". pp. 617–618.
10th generation:
18. "Mary Louisa [Willard]". p. 613.
- Willard, Harvey Bradford, PhD (1925–2008) (2001). A Search for My Ancestry. Bradenton, Florida – via FamilySearch → The author was a 6th great-grandson (9th generation descendant) of Simon Willard (1605–1675). OCLC 865855348, 47017200, 1048494816.
- Willard, Henry Kellogg (1856–1926) (1925). A Memorial to Henry Augustus Willard and Sarah Bradley Willard. Willard-Bradley Memoirs. Andover, Massachusetts: Privately Printed – via Google Books. LCCN 26-5448; OCLC 1730208 (all editions).
- Willard, Joseph (1798–1865) (1858). Willard Memoir, or Life and Times of Major Simon Willard: With Notices of Three Generations of His Descendants, and Two Collateral Branches in the United States; Also Some Account of the Family in Europe, From an Early Day. Boston: Phillips, Sampson, and Company. pp. 125, 132, 142–150, 157, 183–184, 212 – via Google Books → See article about Simon Willard (Massachusetts colonist) (1605–1676). LCCN 09-18748; OCLC 19564948 (all editions).
