= Moorten Botanical Garden and Cactarium =

Botanical garden in Palm Springs, California, US

Moorten Botanical Garden
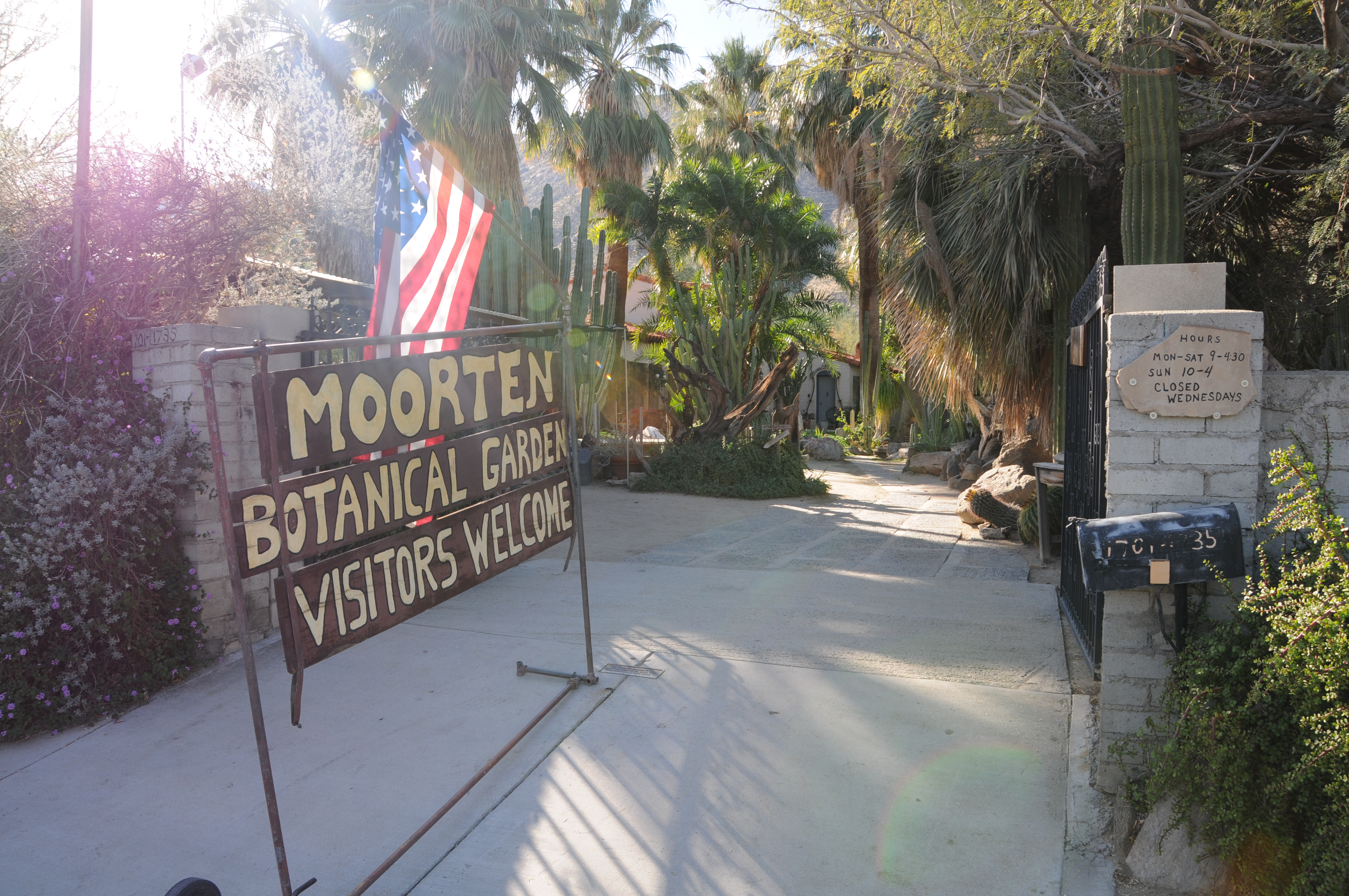
- The entrance to the Moorten Botanical Garden
- Interactive map of Moorten Botanical Garden
- Type: Botanical
- Location: Palm Springs, California, US; 1701 South Palm Canyon Drive
- Coordinates: 33.8003°N 116.5460°W
- Area: 1 acre (0.40 hectares)
- Opened: 1938
- Visitors: 200 per day
- Plants: Cacti
- Species: 3,000
- Collections: Desert climates
- Website: www.moortenbotanicalgarden.com

The Moorten Botanical Garden and Cactarium is a 1 acre (0.40 ha) family-owned botanical garden in Palm Springs, California, specializing in cacti and other desert plants. The gardens lie within Riverside County's Coachella Valley, part of the Colorado Desert ecosystem.

== History ==
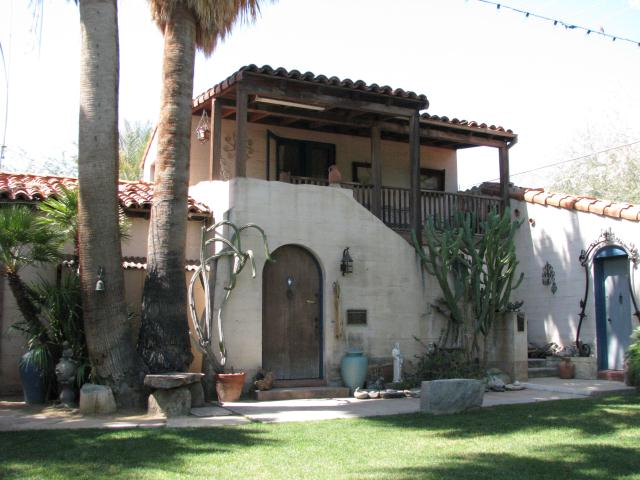
The Moorten residence, known as "The Cactus Castle", at the garden

The Moorten Gardens were established as a nursery in 1939 by Patricia and Chester "Cactus Slim" Moorten, and developed into the present day garden in 1955. Chester, one of the original Keystone Cops, starred in Two Flaming Youths (1927) and The Sideshow (1928).

The Moorten residence was named the Cactus Castle, and was originally built in Mediterranean style by photographer Stephen H. Willard (1894–1966). The Moortens collected many of their own specimen plants from Baja California, mainland Mexico, and as far south as Guatemala. To recognize their contributions to the community, the Moortens were awarded "Golden Palm Stars" on the Palm Springs Walk of Stars.

== Collections ==
=== Ecoregion habitats ===
The garden includes 3,000 examples of desert cacti and other desert plants, grouped by geographic regions:

- Arizona – Sonoran and Yuma Deserts
- Baja California Peninsula
- California – High Desert–Mojave Desert and Low Desert–Colorado and Yuha Deserts
- Colorado Plateau – Great Basin Desert
- Sonora, Mexico – Gran Desierto de Altar
- South Africa – Succulent Karoo
- South America – Monte and Patagonian Deserts
- Texas – Chihuahuan Desert

=== Garden collections ===
Outdoor collections include: Agaves, Bombax, crested Cereus and Boojum trees, "arborescent candelabra Euphorbia", a two-story Pachypodium, thorned Caesalpinia and Bursera, and over a dozen Aloes of southern Africa and Madagascar.

"Cactarium" greenhouse collections include: cacti and succulents, with caudiciform species exhibiting thickened root crowns, many species of Asclepiads, Aztecia, Gymnocalycium, Alstromeria, Euphorbia, and Ferocactus, plus two fine examples of Welwitschia mirabilis from Namibian deserts.

== See also ==
- Living Desert Zoo and Gardens
- List of botanical gardens in the United States
