= Samuel Langdon =

American Congregational clergyman and educator, President of Harvard College

The Reverend Samuel Langdon

President of Harvard College
- In office 1774–1780
- Preceded by: John Winthrop
- Succeeded by: Joseph Willard

Personal details
- Born: January 12, 1723 Boston, Massachusetts
- Died: November 29, 1797 (aged 74) Hampton Falls, New Hampshire
- Education: Boston Latin School; Harvard College

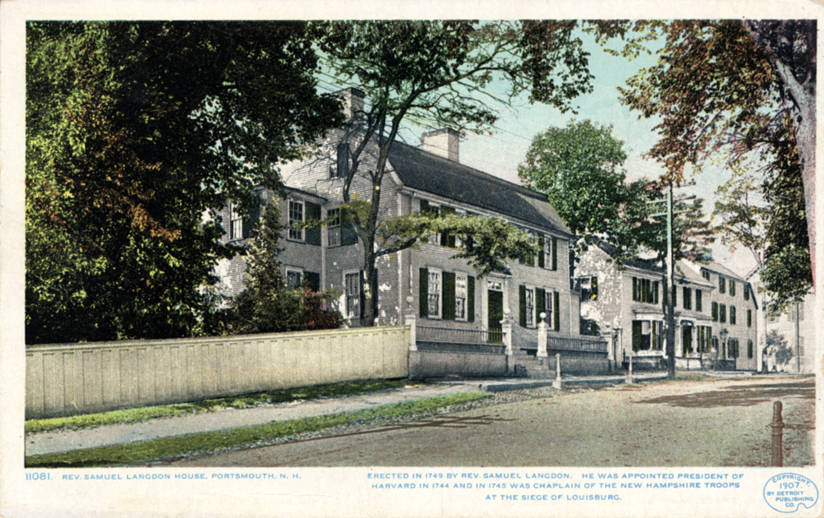
Rev Samuel Langdon House in Portsmouth

Samuel Langdon (January 12, 1723 – November 29, 1797) was an American Congregational clergyman and educator. After serving as pastor in Portsmouth, New Hampshire, he was appointed president of Harvard College in 1774. He held that post until 1780.

== Early life and education ==
Born in Boston, Massachusetts, on January 12, 1723, to Samuel Langdon (1687–1723) and Esther Osgood. Langdon attended Boston Latin School and graduated from Harvard in 1740.

While teaching in Portsmouth, New Hampshire, he studied theology, and was licensed to preach.

== Career ==
In 1745, he was appointed chaplain of a regiment, and was present at the capture of Fortress Louisbourg. On his return, he was appointed assistant to Reverend James Fitch of the North Church of Portsmouth. He was ordained as pastor in 1747, and continued in that charge till 1774, when he became president of Harvard.

At Harvard, his ardent patriotism led him to adopt measures that were obnoxious to the Tory students. During the period of June 1775 to April 1776, he was brigade chaplain to the Massachusetts troops. Although he endeavored to administer the government of the college with justice, his resignation was virtually compelled in 1780. The following year, he became pastor of the Congregational church at Hampton Falls, New Hampshire.

In 1788, he was a delegate to the New Hampshire convention that adopted the U.S. Constitution, often led its debates, and did much to remove prejudice against the Constitution.

Langdon was distinguished as a scholar and theologian, and exerted a wide influence in his community. The University of Aberdeen gave him the degree of Doctor of Divinity in 1762. He was a charter member of the American Academy of Arts and Sciences. He published Summary of Christian Faith and Practice (1768); Observations on the Revelations (1791); Remarks on the Leading Sentiments of Dr. Hopkins's System of Doctrines (1794) and many sermons. In 1761, in connection with Colonel Joseph Blanchard, he prepared and published a map of New Hampshire.

== Death ==
Langdon died in Hampton Falls, New Hampshire, on November 29, 1797.

Academic offices
Preceded by John Winthrop (acting)	President of Harvard College; 1774–1780	Succeeded by Joseph Willard
