= Eliphalet Pearson =

Acting president of Harvard University

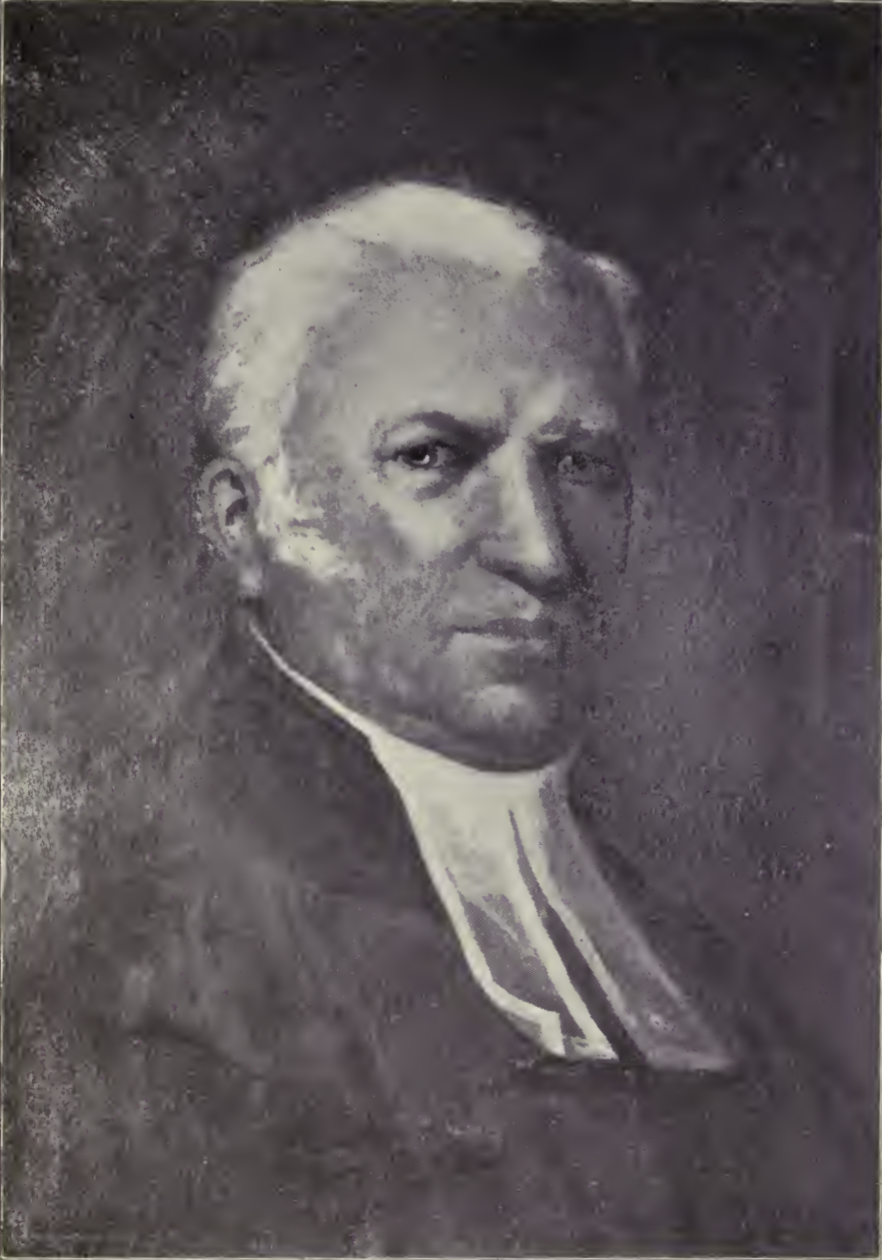

1st Preceptor of Phillips Academy
- In office 1778–1786
- Preceded by: office established
- Succeeded by: Ebenezer Pemberton

Acting President of Harvard University
- In office 1804–1806
- Preceded by: Joseph Willard
- Succeeded by: Samuel Webber

Personal details
- Born: Eliphalet Pearson; June 11, 1752 Newbury, Massachusetts
- Died: September 12, 1826 (aged 74) Greenland, New Hampshire
- Education: The Governor's Academy; Harvard College, 1773

Eliphalet Pearson (June 11, 1752 – September 12, 1826) was an American educator, the first Preceptor of Phillips Academy (1778–86), and the acting president of Harvard University (1804–06). He also co-founded the American Education Society. (Note: The American Society for the Education of Pious Youth for the Gospel Ministry was "organized in 1815 for the purpose of aid in the education of Protestant clergymen." It was renamed "American Education Society" in 1820.)

Pearson graduated from Harvard in 1773, where he was a member of the Hasty Pudding, after having attended Dummer Charity School (now known as The Governor's Academy). He was elected a Fellow of the American Academy of Arts and Sciences in 1781. Beginning in 1786, he was the second person to hold the Hancock Chair of Hebrew and Other Oriental Languages. He held the chair until 1806.

After the death of Joseph Willard in 1804, Pearson became the interim president of Harvard University. He resigned that post in 1806, when Samuel Webber became president.

== Notes ==
Academic offices
Preceded by Joseph Willard	President of Harvard University acting 1804–1806	Succeeded by Samuel Webber
Preceded by office established	Preceptor of Phillips Academy; 1778–1786	Succeeded by Ebenezer Pemberton
