= Ann Zwinger =

Ann Haymond Zwinger (1925–2014) was the author of many natural histories noted for detail and lyrical prose.

== Early life and education ==
Ann Haymond Zwinger was born March 12, 1925, in Muncie, Indiana, the daughter of William and Ann Haymond. While young, she lived along the White River. She studied art history and was awarded two degrees, an A.B. in Arts in 1946 by Wellesley College with the designation "Wellesley College Scholar," now considered roughly equivalent to "cum laude," and an A.M. in Fine Arts by Indiana University in 1950. She married Herman H. Zwinger, a pilot, in 1952.

== Career ==
In 1960, Zwinger moved to Colorado Springs with her husband and began to study Western ecology. In 1970, her first book was published, Beyond the Aspen Grove. She and co-author Beatrice Willard were finalists for the 1973 National Book Award in science for Land Above the Trees. Run, River, Run was another distinguished book published in 1975. It received glowing reviews by The New York Times, the John Burroughs Memorial Association Gold Medal for a distinguished contribution in natural history, and the Friends of American Writers Award for non-fiction. Her more than 20 books on natural history often featured her own illustrations.

She taught Southwest Studies and English at Colorado College.

== Death ==
Zwinger died in Portland, Oregon on August 30, 2014.

== Bibliography ==
- Beyond the Aspen Grove, 1970
- Land Above the Trees: A Guide to American Alpine Tundra, 1972
- Run, River, Run: A Naturalist's Journey Down One of the Great Rivers of the West, 1975
- Wind in the Rock: The Canyonlands of Southeastern Utah, 1978
- A Conscious Stillness: Two Naturalists on Thoreau's Rivers, 1982
- A Desert Country near the Sea: A Natural History of the Cape Region of Baja California, 1983
- John Xantus: The Fort Tejon Letters, 1857-1859 (editor), 1986
- The Mysterious Lands: A Naturalist Explores the Four Great Deserts of the Southwest, 1989
- Aspen: Blazon of the High Country, 1991
- Writing the Western Landscape, 1994
- Downcanyon: A Naturalist Explores the Colorado River Through Grand Canyon, 1995
- Women in Wilderness: Writings and Photographs, 1995
- The Nearsighted Naturalist, 1998
- Nature's Fading Chorus: Classic And Contemporary Writings On Amphibians, 2000
- Shaped by Wind and Water: Reflections of a Naturalist, 2000
- Spanish Peaks: Land and Legends, 2001
- Fall Colors Across North America, 2001
- Yosemite: Valley of Thunder, 2002
- Grand Canyon: Little Things in a Big Place, 2006
- Introduction to The Sea Around Us by Rachel Carson, 1979
- Foreword to The Forgotten Peninsula by Joseph Wood Krutch, 1986 e.
- Foreword to The Naturalist's Path; Beginning the Study of Nature, by Cathy Johnson, 1987, 1991
- Foreword to On Becoming Lost; A Naturalist's Search for Meaning, by Cathy Johnson, 1990
- Introduction to The Walker's Companion by Bill and Margaret Forbes, illustrated in part by Cathy Johnson, et al., 1995
- Introduction to Into the Field: A Guide to Locally Focused Teaching by Clare Walker Leslie, 1999
- Epilogue to Nature's Fading Chorus: Classic and Contemporary Writings on Amphibians by Gordon L. Miller (editor), 2000
- Foreword to Profitably Soaked by Robert Lawrence France, 2003
- Foreword to River And Desert Plants of the Grand Canyon by Kristin Huisinga, 2006
- Foreword to America: A Photographic Journey by Suzan Hall, Fred Hirschmann, 2007
