= Howard W. Willard =

Howard Whitford Willard (1894–1960) was an American visual artist and illustrator. He is known for his lithographs and woodcuts, and his western and "ethnic" dust jackets.

== Life and career ==
Born in 1894, in Illinois, he moved to California as a child and spent part of his life there, along with an extended period in New York City, where he was a prominent member of the art scene. He studied at the Art Students League of New York. In 1938, he joined the staff of the Cooper Union in design instruction as an "illustrative designer." He was married to art critic Charlotte Willard.

Willard worked in both commercial publishing and fine press publishing, producing work for a range of audiences, from children to literary collectors to readers of textbooks. In 1943, the US War Department hired him to illustrate guidebooks used by American troops overseas. A year earlier he had been one of a group of American artists selected for a joint Cuban-American project to design postage stamps for Cuba that sought to raise awareness of the danger of "Fifth Columnists" in that country. In the 1940s, Willard was associated with artists of the New Masses such as Art Young and Rockwell Kent, participating with them in an effort to raise money for the periodical in 1943. Willard served as president of the Advertisers Guild in New York in 1940.

The Howard W. Willard Papers are held at the Smithsonian Archives of American Art.

== List of illustrations ==
=== Limited edition books ===
- Design for Carolyn Wells, “Lavinia Dickinson.” The Colophon: A Book Collectors’ Quarterly, Part Three (September 1930). Limited to 2000 copies.
- Dust jacket, slipcase, and illustrations. Norman Douglas, Summer Islands (New York: Colophon, 1931). Limited to 550 copies.
- Illustrations. Robert Louis Stevenson, The Silverado Squatters (1923).

=== Commercial publications ===
- Maps. Mary Viola Gross, From the Creation of Man to Eternity (Los Angeles: Warren T. Potter, 1916)
- Cover design and illustrations. Rose L. Ellerbee, Tales of California Yesterdays (Los Angeles, Warren T. Potter, 1916)
- Cover design and illustrations. Anna Taggart Clark, The Quest of “Little Blessing” (Los Angeles: Warren T. Potter, 1916)
- [Illustrations]. Charles Mertz, The Great American Band Wagon (New York: John Day, 1928).
- Illustrations. Kathleen Norris, The Foolish Virgin (New York: Doubleday, Doran, 1928)
- Dust Jacket. Edna Ferber, Cimarron (Garden City: Doubleday, Doran, 1930)
- Decorations (cover and interior). Christopher Morley, Don’t Open Until Christmas (Garden City: Doubleday, Doran, 1931).
- Illustrations. Ricardo Guiraldes, Don Segundo Sombra. Shadows on the Pampas. Trans. Harriet de Onis. (New York: Farrar & Rinehart, 1935).
- Dust jacket and illustrations for Elizabeth Morrow, Rabbit’s Nest (New York: MacMillan, 1940).
- Line drawings. Todd Downing, Mexican Earth (Doubleday, 1940).
- Cover and illustrations. E.C. Hills and J.D.M. Ford, First Spanish Course (Boston: D.C. Heath, 1941).
- Cover and illustrations. Charles E. Kaney, Spoken Spanish for Students and Travelers: Revised Edition (Boston: D. C. Heath, 1943).
- Decorations. First Portuguese Reader (New York: Oxford University Press, 1943).
- Decorations. Raymond L. Grismer, Tales from Spanish America (New York: Oxford University Press, 1944).
- Illustrations. John Beatty, Memoirs of a Volunteer, 1861-1863 (New York: W. W. Norton, [1946]).
- Illustrations. Pearl Buck, The Good Earth (Cleveland: World Publishing, 1947)
- Dust jacket for Amaury de Riencourt, Roof of the World: Tibet, Key to Asia (Rinehart, 1950)
- Illustrations. Reader’s Digest Condensed Books: Summer 1950 Selections v. 2(Pleasantville, NY: Reader's Digest Association, 1950).
- Illustrations. 1954 North Cape Cruise (Cunard Line and American Express, 1954).
- Dust jacket (and ills?) for Max Wylie, Clear Channels: Television and the American People (New York: Funk & Wagnalls, 1955)
- Illustrations for Donald Hough, The Cocktail Hour in Jackson Hole (Norton, 1956).

=== Record album art ===
- Cover art for Six Songs for Democracy, Keynote Records, 1940.

== List of art exhibitions ==
- Lotte Jacobi's, New York, 1955. "Casein drawings and collages." New York Times reviewer "S.P" found the exhibition too commercial on the whole.
- Mills College Gallery, New York, 1958. "Sketches, paintings, and collages." Dore Ashton reviewed the exhibition, noting Willard's mix of "wry humor with a bright sense of selection especially in his collages."
- Gallery 303, 1960.
- Far Gallery, New York, 1976. "Paintings, watercolors, constructions, and collages of scenes in the United States, Mexico and China.
