= Joseph Willard =

President of Harvard College

The Reverend Joseph Willard

11th President of Harvard University
- Preceded by: Samuel Langdon
- Succeeded by: Eliphalet Pearson

Personal details
- Born: December 29, 1738 Biddeford, Province of Massachusetts Bay, British America
- Died: September 25, 1804 (aged 65) New Bedford, Massachusetts, U.S.
- Education: Dummer Academy

Joseph Willard (December 29, 1738 – September 25, 1804) was an American Congregational clergyman and academic. He was president of Harvard from 1781 until 1804.

== Biography ==
Coat of Arms of Joseph Willard

Willard was born December 29, 1738, in Biddeford, York County (at that time part of the Province of Massachusetts Bay, but subsequently the state of Maine) into one of the most illustrious families in Colonial Massachusetts. His parents were Reverend Samuel Willard (1705-1741) and Abigail Willard (née Sherman). One of his great-grandfathers was another Reverend Samuel Willard, and his great-great-grandfather was Major Simon Willard.

Joseph's father died when he was two years old and one year later his mother remarried to a Rev. Richard Elvins. Joseph was educated at the Dummer Academy (now known as The Governor's Academy). Through the generosity of friends he entered Harvard College, where he received a B.A. in 1765, and an M.A. in 1768. He was a tutor at Harvard until 1772, when he began serving as pastor at the First Congregational Church in Beverly, Massachusetts. In 1780 he was a charter member and first corresponding secretary of the American Academy of Arts and Sciences. In 1785, he was awarded a Doctor of Divinity degree from Harvard and in 1791, a Doctor of Laws degree from Yale University.

In 1781, he became president of Harvard, in which he served until his death. His tenure was marked by his institution of a dress code (due to his disapproval of the brightly colored silk garments often worn by pupils) consisting of blue-gray coats, and breeches and waistcoats in four approved colors. In 1789, he was recorded as owning an enslaved man named Cesar. When delivering the 1799 commencement address, Willard broke with tradition and delivered it in English, rather than the customary Latin. In 1804, Willard was elected a member of the American Philosophical Society in Philadelphia.

Joseph Willard died in New Bedford, Massachusetts on September 25, 1804.

His great-grandfather Samuel Willard had served as Acting President of Harvard from 1701 until his own death in 1707.

Willard was the father of Cambridge Mayor Sidney Willard.

== Works ==
He published a few sermons, a Latin address on the death of George Washington, prefixed to David Tappan's Discourse (Cambridge, 1800), and mathematical and astronomical papers in the Memoirs of the American Academy of Arts and Sciences, and the Transactions of the American Philosophical Society. He was a sound Greek scholar, and left a Greek grammar in manuscript.

== See also ==
- Descendants of Simon Willard (1605–1676)

== Notes ==
Academic offices
Preceded by Samuel Langdon	President of Harvard University; 1781–1804	Succeeded by Eliphalet Pearson
