= Xerxes Willard =

American dairyman, lawyer, and newspaper editor

Xerxes Addison Willard (c. 1820–1882) was an American dairyman, lawyer, and newspaper editor who wrote under the name X. A. Willard. After touring dairies across Europe, he wrote Practical Dairy Husbandry, a work of 550 pages published in octavo format in 1871. It became the standard reference work for dairies.

″He was one of the first to study carefully the principles underlying the production of milk and the manufacture of butter and cheese,” wrote H. H. Wing in the Cyclopedia of American Horticulture. In addition to numerous articles and pamphlets, Willard also wrote The Practical Butter Book, which remained the authoritative text about butter for many years. The work of Otto Frederick Hunziker, The Butter Industry, eventually superseded Willard′s work.

Despite his travels, Willard was firmly anchored in his home town of Little Falls (city), New York. After graduating from Hamilton College in 1845, he began studying law with a firm in Little Falls. He married Harriet L. Hallet of Fairfield, New York, in 1848 and bought his maternal grandfather′s farm in Little Falls, Herkimer County, New York. The couple had five children.

In 1858, Willard began a three-year stint as the editor of the Herkimer County Journal. After a few years in other pursuits, in 1864 he became the agricultural editor of the Utica Morning Herald and worked there until 1869. During that time, in 1866, he toured notable European dairying areas as a special commissioner of the American Dairymen′s Association. Later he moved to the Rural New-Yorker, where he was dairy editor for eight years. He was affiliated with Cornell University and Maine Agricultural College for part of his career. Willard was heavily involved in the founding and early years of the New York State Dairymen′s Association and the American Dairymen′s Association.

In addition to being a prolific writer, Willard was a popular speaker on many aspects of dairying and the marketing of dairy products. His home county, known for the quantity and quality of its cheddar-style cheese production, was the site of the first organized cheese market in the U.S., partly due to advantageous canal and railroad connections to the burgeoning New York City market and to the port, from which upstate New York cheese was exported to Britain and Europe. By 1871, the New York State Dairymen′s Board of Trade market was thriving, in part because telegraph lines brought up-to-date pricing information from European and U.S. markets, and Willard was its first president.

== Ancestry ==
Xerxes A. Willard was a 5th great-grandson (8th generation descendant) of the Massachusetts colonist Simon Willard (1605–1676). X. A. Willard was also a great-grandfather of American botanist Beatrice Willard (1925–2003).

The paternal grandparents of X. A. Willard were Joseph Willard, born June 26, 1750, died October 31, 1832, and Rachel Reeves, born April 30, 1747, died November 22, 1829.

His maternal grandfather was Judge Evans Wharry. Wharry was a surveyor who grew up in Orange County, New York. He served during the Revolution and a history of Herkimer County says he was personally acquainted with George Washington, Alexander Hamilton, and Aaron Burr, among others. Wharry settled near Little Falls in 1785, establishing a farm that eventually passed into the hands of X. A. Willard. In 1798, Wharry became a justice of the peace and was also appointed as one of the judges of the Court of Common Pleas in Herkimer County. He served until he was 60 years old, having reached the mandatory retirement age. Evans W. Wharry died April 12, 1831; his wife was Phoebe Belknap, who died May 11, 1852.

X. A. Willard was the son of Little Falls physician Nathan Sylvester Willard, who was born March 29, 1788, in Connecticut, and died September 29, 1827, at age 39 in Little Falls. Dr. Willard was trained at the Fairfield Medical Academy in Herkimer County and graduated in 1810.

Dr. N. S. Willard married Mary Wharry in Little Falls on September 27, 1813. She died February 11, 1843, and is buried in the Wharry family plot in Eaton′s Bush Cemetery, Eatonville, N.Y. N. S. Willard and his wife Mary had five children: Charlotte, Nathan Sylvester Willard Jr., Xerxes Addison, Mary S., and Gulielma Belknap.
