= Walter Turnbull =

American musician

Dr. Walter Turnbull (19 July 1944 in Greenville, Mississippi – 23 March 2007) was an American musician and the founder of the Boys Choir of Harlem. Turnbull graduated from Tougaloo College where he studied classical music and vocal performance.

He moved to New York City in 1968, and in addition to continuing his education at the Manhattan School of Music started to perform as a tenor with the New York Philharmonic. He also began teaching music at a Harlem church upon his arrival in New York. This church group eventually turned into a popular city choir and then eventually the internationally renowned Boys Choir of Harlem.

In 1999, he was awarded the 5th Annual Heinz Award in the Arts and Humanities.

In the spring of 2001, a 14-year-old student came forward to Turnbull and reported that the choir's chief counselor, Frank Jones Jr., had been molesting him for years. Turnbull failed to notify the police and did nothing to investigate the allegations.

It was later revealed that Turnbull and his brother, Horace, the choir's executive vice president, allowed Jones to stay in contact with students even after city officials explicitly banned him from the 650-student academy (a public school that is overseen and financed in part by the Department of Education). Jones was allowed to remain so close to students that he was called upon by the Turnbulls to chaperone at least eight overnight choir trips. A city school official reported to investigators that Horace Turnbull had complained to her that barring Mr. Jones was "a hardship," because he was "an integral part" of the program.

The silence regarding the allegations against Jones was eventually broken when the 14-year-old student's mother went to the authorities. That fall Jones was arrested, tried and sentenced to two years in prison for multiple counts of third-degree sexual abuse and endangerment of a child.

In 2003, city investigators concluded that the Turnbull brothers had failed to report the complaints of abuse to the authorities and had allowed Mr. Jones to continue working with children. A memorandum was issued to the choir's board of directors by investigators for the New York City schools. It urged the choir's board to dismiss the Turnbull brothers. The board immediately asked for the resignation of Walter and Horace Turnbull. Both men refused to resign and defended themselves publicly. In a surprising move, the choir board then voted unanimously to recommend that the Turnbulls be kept on in a revised capacity.

As a result, the city school system's investigative arm recommended that the Department of Education "sever all ties" with the academy if the Turnbulls remain. Shortly after, the Department of Education did just that and evicted the choir from the city-owned school property where they had been operating rent-free since 1993. The Choir relocated to the Metropolitan Community Methodist Church.

He died on March 23, 2007, in a New York City hospital. He had reportedly suffered a stroke months earlier.
