= John Willard (disambiguation) =

John Willard (died 1692) was an American witchcraft defendant.

John Willard may also refer to:

- John Willard (Australian politician) (1857 − after 1898), New South Wales politician
- John Willard (judge) (1792–1862), New York lawyer and politician
- John Willard (playwright) (1885–1942), American playwright
- John Willard (U.S. Marshal) (1759–1825), American physician and businessman from Vermont
- John D. Willard (1799–1864), New York lawyer and politician
