= Amaury de Riencourt =

French sinologist (1918–2005)

- Born: 12 June 1918; Orléans, France
- Died: 13 January 2005 (aged 86); Bellevue, Switzerland

Academic background
- Education: College of Sorbonne; University of Algiers

Academic work
- Discipline: Southeast Asian studies, South Asian studies, American studies, Tibetan studies, Chinese studies

Amaury de Riencourt (French: [amoʁi də ʁjɛ̃kuʁ]; 12 June 1918 – 13 January 2005) was a French writer and historian. He was an expert on Southeast Asia, an Indian scholar, a Sinologist, a Tibetologist, and an Americanist.

De Riencourt's magnum opus was probably The Coming Caesars (1957), which explores the ethnic and ideological roots of America, Europe, and Russia, comparing classical times with the contemporary world (i.e., the 19th and 20th centuries).

== Biography ==
Amaury de Riencourt was born in Orléans into a family of the French nobility that dates back at least to the 12th century. He graduated from the Sorbonne in Paris and held a Master's degree from the University of Algiers.

From 1939 to 1940, during the earlier part of the Second World War, de Riencourt served in the French Navy.

In 1947, de Riencourt visited Tibet, staying in Lhasa, where he remained for five months. He met the Dalai Lama, Tenzin Gyatso, then just twelve years old, who declared that the country was governed in all areas as an independent nation, adding that the orders of his government were obeyed across the country.

== Works ==
De Riencourt wrote a number of books (all in English), including:

- Roof of the World: Tibet (1950)
- The Coming Caesars (1957), considered his greatest work
- The Soul of China (1958)
- The Soul of India (1960)
- The American Empire (1968)
- Sex and Power in History (1974)
- The Eye of Shiva (1980)
- Woman and Power in History (1983)
- Lost World: Tibet (1987)
- A Child of the Century: Volume 1 (1996), his autobiography
