= Willard Dyson =

American drummer

Willard Dyson is a drummer on the New York City and international music scenes.

He came to New York City in 1986 from the San Francisco Bay area. A versatile musician, he is at home in a myriad of rhythmic genres including jazz, R&B, Latin and Brazilian music. Willard works regularly with a diverse group of musicians including Regina Belle, Grady Tate, Jimmy Scott, The New York Voices, Dakota Staton and Cassandra Wilson. He is also very active on the local jazz scene in New York City, playing at local clubs as well as in various Broadway and off-Broadway shows.

As Regina Belle's drummer, Willard has toured in the United States, Japan and Europe as well as appearing on The Tonight Show, Soul Train, The Arsenio Hall Show, Good Morning America and BET.

He has been called, "perfect, imaginative, sensitive, exciting and subtle, with a stunning flair for devastating funk," in The Wellington Journal. Willard has performed at the New Zealand, JVC, Playboy and Essence Music festivals.

During 2007, he toured with jazz vocalist Michael Franks.
