= Beatrice Willard =

American botanist (1925–2003)

- Born: December 22, 1925; United States
- Died: January 7, 2003 (aged 77)
- Education: Stanford University; University of Colorado
- Scientific career
- Fields: Botany, ecology
- Workplaces: Colorado School of Mines

Beatrice "Bettie" Willard (December 19, 1925 – January 7, 2003) was an American botanist who specialized in studies on the ecology and botany of high alpine tundra, as well as arctic tundra. Willard's studies influenced public policy with her studies, which centered on plant life at high altitudes. Willard was responsible for the establishment of the Beatrice Willard Alpine Tundra Research Plots above the treeline in Rocky Mountain National Park, now listed on the National Register of Historic Places. In later years she was an adviser to U.S. presidents Nixon and Ford as the first woman on the Council on Environmental Quality (CEQ). Along with her research, Willard also established the Colorado School of Mines environmental sciences program.

== Biography ==
Beatrice Willard was born December 19, 1925, the daughter of Stephen and Beatrice Williard, living in Palm Springs, California and Sierra Nevada during her childhood. Her father was a noted landscape photographer. She developed an interest in natural studies by the time she was twelve. From an early age she was encouraged by her parents to read about plants, animals, and the environment around her. She was awarded a B.A. in biological sciences from Stanford University in 1947, then attended the National Park Service Yosemite Field School. However, she was unable to get a job with the Park Service and took work as a high school teacher, first in Salinas, California, then in Oakland, and finally at Tulelake High School in California. In 1952 she began working as a seasonal interpretive ranger at Lava Beds National Monument and Crater Lake National Park. During the 1950s Willard was awarded a Ford Foundation grant to study alpine ecology in Europe. She earned her M.A. in 1960 and her Ph.D. in 1963, both in botany/plant ecology at the University of Colorado, advised by John Marr, founder of the Institute of Arctic and Alpine Research. She wrote Land Above the Trees: A Guide to American Alpine Tundra (1972, revised 1996, with coauthor-illustrator Ann Zwinger), A Guide to the Mammoth Lakes Sierra (1959, with Dean Rinehart and Elden Vestal), A Roadside Guide To Rocky Mountain National Park (1990, with Susan Quimby Foster), and Plants of Rocky Mountain National Park (2000, with Linda H. Beidleman and Richard G. Beidleman). In later years she directed the Thorne Institute in Aspen, Colorado and was active in the Rocky Mountain Chapter of the Sierra Club and with the Colorado Open Space Council. Willard promoted the establishment of Florissant Fossil Beds National Monument. As a member of the CEQ she advised on the design of the Trans-Alaska Pipeline System. After leaving the CEQ in 1973 she joined the Colorado School of Mines and established the school's environmental sciences program, earning a United Nations Outstanding Environmental Leadership Award.
