= Lou Nolan (artist) =

American artist (1926–2008)

- Born: Louis James Nolan, Jr. June 28, 1926; Virginia, US
- Died: October 24, 2008 (aged 82); McLean, Virginia, US
- Education: 1952: Parsons School of Design
- Occupations: Artist: painter, graphic designer
- Years active: 1952–2007

Louis James Nolan, Jr. (28 June 1926 Washington, D.C. – 24 October 2008 McLean, Virginia) was an American artist who, among other things, designed several United States Navy recruiting posters and, from 1985 through 2007, illustrated about twenty-five USPS stamps. In Navy literature, he is sometimes incorrectly credited as Lloyd Nolan. Nolan also created designs for NASA, the Smithsonian Institution, the other branches of the U.S. Armed Forces, and several federal agencies. His work was honored by the Art Directors Club of New York and Print magazine. He won gold and silver medals from the Art Directors Club of Metropolitan Washington. (Note: The Art Directors Club of Metropolitan Washington (ADCMW) flourished from about 1963 through August 2013. In 1963, Philip Sabatino was President.)

== Career ==
Nolan graduated from St. John's College High School, Washington, D.C., in 1944. He went on to serve in the U.S. Navy from March 11, 1945, to March 31, 1946. Beginning June 27, 1945, he served aboard the USS Savo Island.

Nolan studied fine art at the Corcoran School of the Arts and Design in Washington, D.C., and graduated from New York's Parsons School of Design in 1952. He worked as a book designer and illustrator in New York, then returned to Washington to begin a freelance career. Nolan had been working for Creative Arts Studio, Inc., in Washington, D.C., when, in February 1964, in Georgetown, he and two other employees – Bill Duffy and Elmo James White, Jr. (1936–2020) – founded Nolan, Duffy & White, Inc. (ND&W), a commercial art firm. The Navy was the firm's primary client. Around 1971, the firm merged into the predecessor of White64 (E. James White Company → White+Partners, etc.), founded by White. After about ten years, Nolan and Duffy went out on their own. Nolan founded Nolan and Associates, Duffy became a freelance artist.

In the 1960s, Nolan illustrated for The National Guardsman, and, in January 1965, was credited as its Art Director.

Nolan retired in 1995. He died thirteen years later, October 24, 2008, at his home in McClean.

== Selected work ==
=== Book, magazine, and pamphlet illustrations ===
1. Karig, Walter (1898–1956); with Horace Virgil Bird (1912–1984); Nolan, Lou (jacket design and illustrator; not credited, but signed → see back cover) (1954). Don't Tread on Me: A Novel of the Historic Exploits, Military and Gallant, of Commodore John Paul Jones, Founder of the United States Navy, Ever-Victorious in the American Revolution. New York: Rinehart & Company – via Internet Archive → The illustration on the book jacket, in color, by Nolan, depicts John Paul Jones going into action against the British. Jones – with his right arm outstretched, pointing, and his left arm raised, pistol in-hand – is yelling, with four artillery men and a cannon in the foreground – a three-masted heavy frigate in the right background and a partial view of frigate with broken mast in the left background. Jones is wearing a white dress shirt with collar, Continental Navy blue coat with red facings (cuffs and lapels), gold buttons, and gold epaulettes; two of the sailers are wearing head dressings, one is wearing a tricorne hat. LCCN 54-7074; OCLC 1004900981 (all editions).
  (front cover – right half)
  (back cover – left half)
2. Hill, Jim Dan, PhD (né James Daniel Hill; 1897–1983) (author); Nolan, Louis James (illustrator) (1964). The Minute Man in Peace and War: A History of the National Guard (1st ed.). Harrisburg: Stackpole Co. (publisher) & Harrisburg: The Telegraph Press (publisher) → Edward James Stackpole, Jr. (1894–1967) → With illustrations by Louis James Nolan heading each chapter. LCCN 63-22141; ISBN 978-1-2999-2753-7; OCLC 569549 (all editions); OCLC 607042318 (all editions) & 752690050.
1. Snippet View – via Google Books..
2. Snippet View – via Google Books..
Deerin, James Benedict (Col., US Army, Ret.) (1915–1980) (author); Nolan, Lou (book jacket design) (1976). Walker, Luther Loneith, Capt. (born 1939); Tennill, Clint Jr. (eds.). The National Guard Heritage Encampment (souvenir booklet). Washington, D.C.: National Guard Association of the United States. OCLC 12301584 (image).
Deerin, James Benedict (Col., US Army, Ret.) (1915–1980) (author); Nolan, Lou (book cover design) (1976). The Militia in the Revolutionary War. Washington, D.C.: Historical Society of the Militia and National Guard, forerunner to the National Guard Educational Foundation. OCLC 6101476.
  Also published as → Deerin, James Benedict (Col., US Army, Ret.) (1915–1980) (author); Walker, Luther Loneith, Capt. (born 1939) (magazine editor). Walker, ed. (August–September 1976). "The Militia in the Revolutionary War". National Guardsman, the (Special Issue). 30 (8). Washington, D.C.: National Guard Association of the United States: 13–45 – via Google Books. ISSN 0027-9412; OCLC 482025424 (all editions).
1. The National Guardsman Cover art. National Guard Association of the United States. ISSN 0027-9412; OCLC 482025424 (all editions).
1. Nolan, Lou (cover art) (August–September 1976). "Cover" (Special Issue). 30 (8): cover – via Google Books → Nolan's cover illustration depicts a militiaman of the 1st Maryland Regiment reenactment during the Heritage Encampment on the Mall in Washington, August 28–29, 1976.
2. Nolan, Lou (artist, cover) (October 1976). "Cover". 30 (9): cover & 1 – via Google Books. → Nolan's cover illustration is a composite of selected sketches by Amos Doolittle (1754–1832). The image depicts a militiaman, in the foreground, looking at the Concord Bridge (Concord, Massachusetts) (see Old North Bridge), in the background.

=== Posters ===
==== U.S. Navy recruiting posters ====
1. "Heritage", by Louis James Nolan, Jr. (signed on the lower left), gouache on illustration board, painted and printed in 1959; re-printed in 1973, used throughout the Vietnam War and post-Vietnam War era. Nolan painted it under contract to the Navy Recruiting Command. It is one of the most recognized Navy images of the past 60 years and was recently incorporated into the logo of the Naval History and Heritage Command (NHHC). The original painting hangs in the stairwell of the Fleet and Family Support Center aboard Naval Base San Diego. Nolan's brother, Bryan Hoyt Nolan (1944–2010), who then was a sailor, and Nolan's son, James Nolan, posed for the painting. Nolan painted it in his backyard in Bethesda, Maryland. The painting depicts a Petty Officer First Class holding the hand of a child on a pier, looking at the historic USS Constitution (Old Ironsides). Catalog no. NH 67050-KN; NH Accession nos. 83-076-A & 69-274-V-01; OCLC 895002022.
  RAD 67509
  RAD 74715
2. "Night Run" – "Fly Navy" (Tom "Mongoose" McEwen: Drag Racing) (1975) (12" x 24"). Re: Tom McEwen (1937–2018) – depicts McEwen's 1971 Plymouth Duster Demon Funny Car with "Fly Navy" sponsorship shown on the side. Don Prudhomme (the "Snake") was sponsored by the U.S. Army.
  U.S. Government Printing Office 1975—652–505
  RAD 599–0546
3. "Navy Pilot" (1977). Lou Nolan (designer and illustrator); Fred Grumm (art director); Fred J. Maroon (1924–2001) (photographer); Hank Fankhauser (copywriter).
4. "Travel Navy" (NRAF 41110) – depicts two small Chinese junk (boats) in the foreground with the USS Miller (DD–535) anchored in Hong Kong Harbour in the background. NH Accession No. 81-156-AJ-01; Catalog nos. NH 69647-KN; OCLC 1054400095.
  NRAF 21120
5. "Peak Performance – Fly Navy" – features a Navy jet flying over a city, with another jet and other Navy vessels below. Catalog no. NH 67034-KN.
  NRAF 64409
  NRAF 65411
6. "Sail With the Bold Ones" – "Navy" – depicts a sailor in the foreground on a ship hoisting (or taking down) the American Flag while seagulls fly around. The ship in the background is the USS Saratoga (CV–60); 14" x 19" → Catalog no. NH 67040-KN.
  RAD 66308
  RAD 67505
7. "Ready for Action" – "Navy" – depicts a sailor in combat attire aboard a battleship.
  NRAF 41113
8. "Command the Bold Ones" – "Navy" (1968) – Navy officer recruiting poster. Catalog no. NH 67035-KN.
  RAD 66307
9. "Navy" – "Horizons Unlimited" – featuring Douglas A-4 Skyhawks. Catalog no. NH 78801-KN; NH Accession No. 81-156-AI.
  NRAF 41129
10. "Esteemed" – "Navy" – depicting portraits of two sailors, female (in front) and male.
  NRAF 11113
11. "Then As Now ... Guardians of Freedom" – "Navy" (1966) – Painting of a contemporary sailor and officer (holding binoculars) in the foreground and silhouettes a colonial sailor and officer in the background with the American flag overhead. Issued during the Vietnam War period; 28.5" x 40". Catalog no. NH 67036-KN.
  GPO 1966 O–796–388 ... RAD 66403
12. "Pride" – "Navy" (signed on the lower right) – depicting two sailors aboard an aircraft carrier looking at the flight deck with a Douglas A-4 Skyhawk (No. 309) in the background and two runway controllers in the background.
13. "Serve With Pride" – "Navy" (signed on the lower right). Catalog no. NH 69646-KN
14. "Serve With Pride and Patriotism" – "Navy" (GPO 1966) (1966) (signed on the lower right) – depicts portraits of three modern Navy women: Enlistee, Nurse, Officer. Catalog no. NH 67041-KN.
  RAD 66511 – GPO 1966 O–796
  NRAF 47101
15. "Fly Your Own Jet" – "U.S. Navy" – "It's And Education" – featuring an aviator adjusting his helmet. Catalog no. NH 67039-KN.
  RAD 67502
16. "Strong for Peace" – "Navy" (1972) – painting, wash, gouache and pencil on paper – features a portrait of a Navy seaman in the background and a combat outfitted personnel wearing a Helmut and life-preserver in the foreground with the USS John Paul Jones (DDG–32) battleship in rough sea between the two. NH Accession No. 97-107-FX

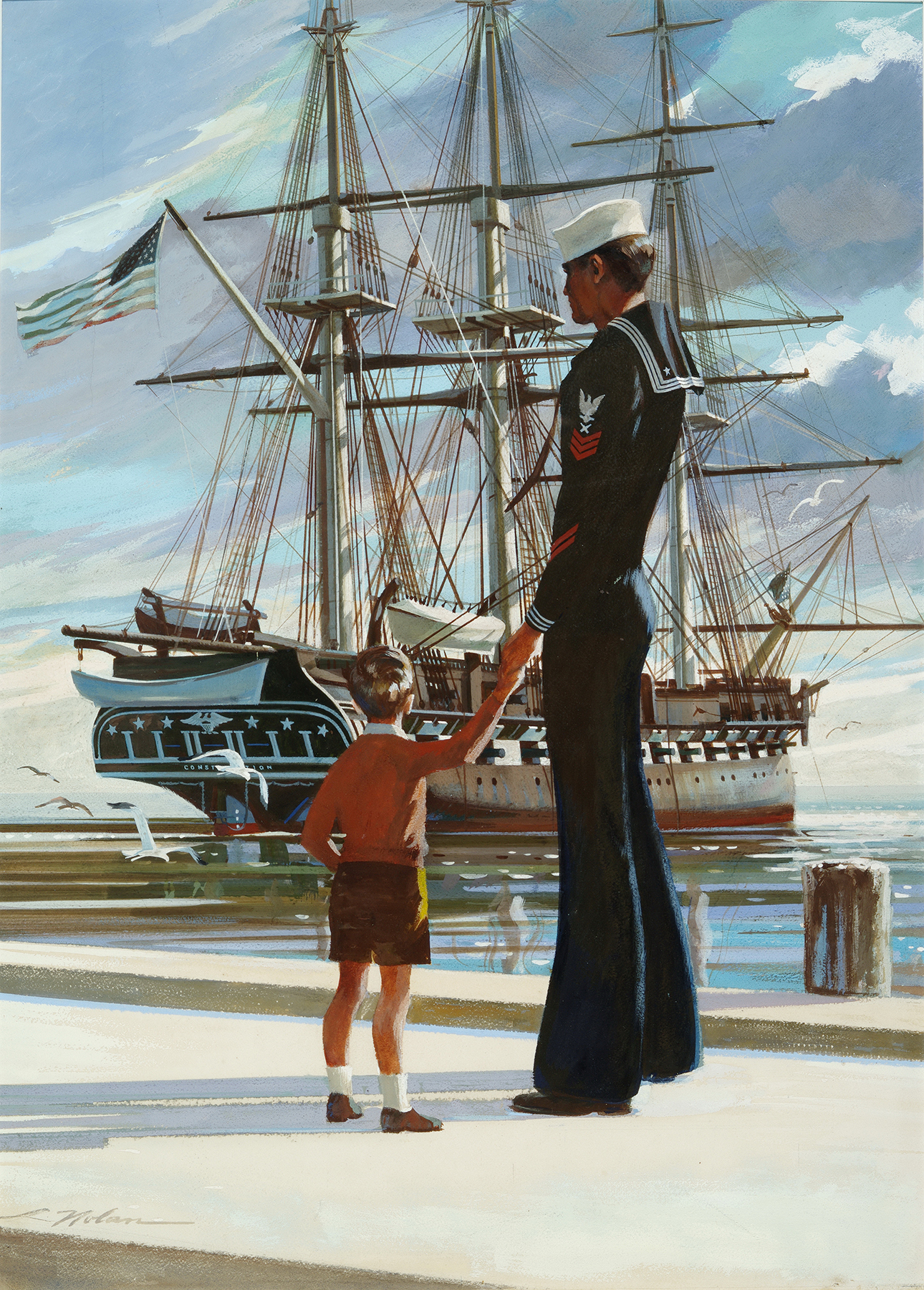
"Heritage", Lou Nolan (1959)

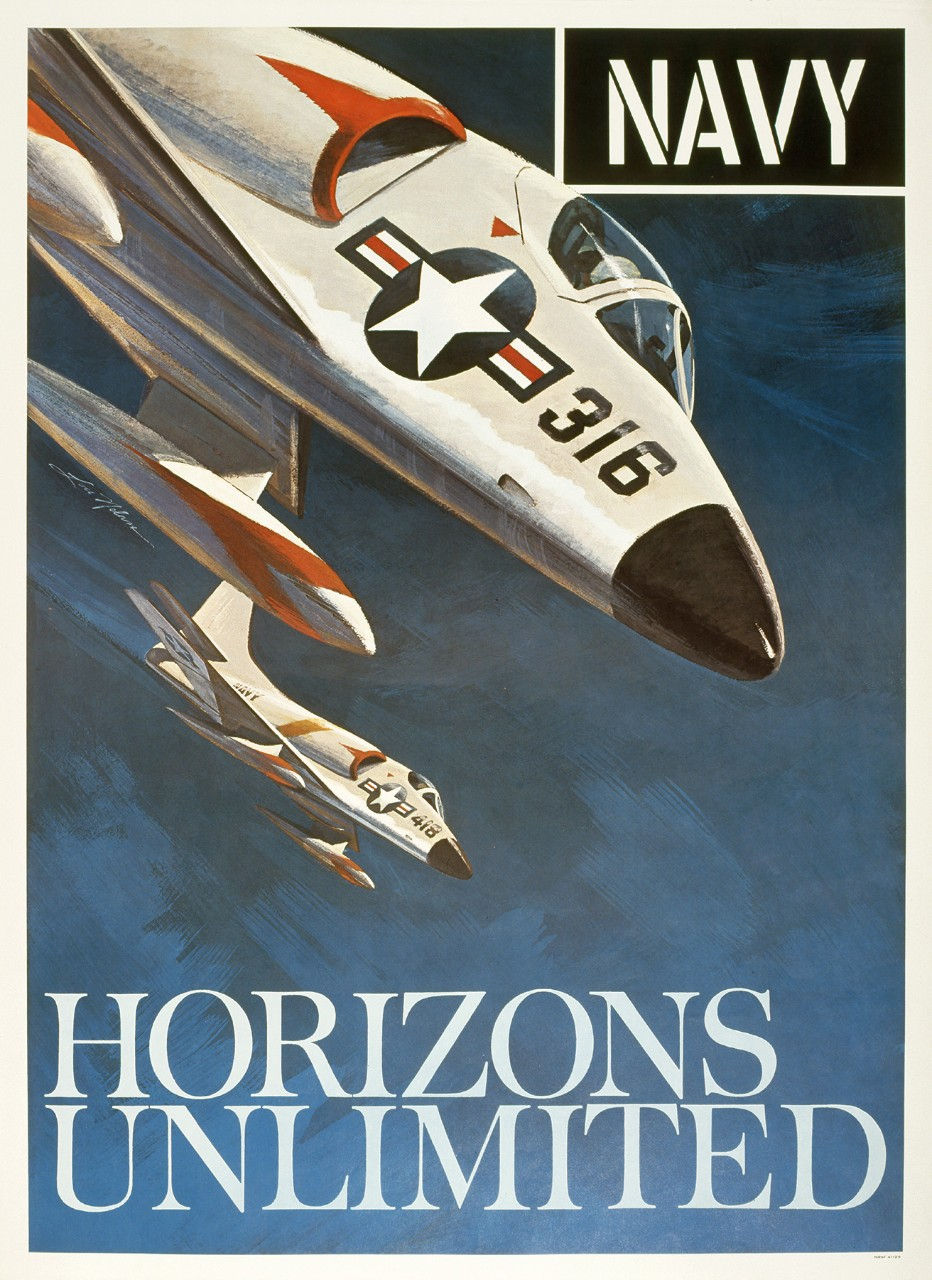
"Horizons Unlimited", Lou Nolan (c. 1960s)

==== U.S. Air Force recruiting poster ====
1. U.S. Air Force recruiting poster: Lithograph – "'Our American Eagles' The United States Air Force Salutes The American Bicentennial 1776–1976" (c. 1976) – depicting three Airforce personnel: (i) an airman, (ii) a World War I era pilot, and (iii) an astronaut. In the background is a Wrights brothers bi-plane, two World War I bi-planes, a modern jet, (iv) two eagles, and a star insignia. (image)

––––––––––––––––––––

NRAF = Navy Recruiting Aids Facility, a bygone headquarters for U.S. Navy Recruiting located in (i) Baltimore at East Fallsway and Monument Streets – west of the East Monument Historic District and at the Navy Yard Annex, Washington, D.C. The unit was once commanded by James G. Readen (1901–1960).
RAD = Recruiting Advertising Item

=== NASA ===
1. 1970: "The Grand Tour," depiction for NASA's Jet Propulsion Laboratory (JPL) of Pioneer 10 arcing beyond the orbit of Pluto (see Grand Tour program)
  Quote: foregrounded against its red line trajectory and the planets with their blue-green orbital lines. link
2. 1984: Nolan designed a patch for NASA that was worn by Christa McAuliffe, the schoolteacher who died in the Space Shuttle Challenger disaster. Nolan's granddaughter, Nashville vocalist Danica Dora, with vocalist Josh Kaler, recorded an album in 1915, Together in Space – and dedicated it (and the album artwork) to Christa McAuliffe. The album artwork is by Joshua M. Burggraf (born 1983).

=== United States Postage Stamps ===
Nolan designed many stamp products for the U.S. Postal Service® and more than a dozen stamps, including the first five in the American Design series that began in 2002. Some of these stamps have been reprinted in recent years, including:

Transportation Series (1981–1995)

1. 3.4¢ postage stamp: "School Bus", a 1920s-style school bus – at a rate for carrier route third-class bulk mailings by nonprofit organizations.
  1985 → Scott No. 2123.
2. 17¢ postage stamp: "Dog Sled." depicting a 1920s Alaskan dog sled witihout reigns or traces, based on archive photographs and a sled displayed (in 1986) at the Smithsonian – a type of sled that was still (as of 1986) built and used in Alaska.
  1986 → Scott No. USA 2135.
  1986 → Scott No. USA 2135A (imperfect).
3. 5¢ postage stamp: "Milk Wagon 1900s." link
  1987 → Scott No. USA 2253.
4. 5.3¢ postage stamp: "Elevator 1900s USA", depicting a turn-of-the-century elevator, nonprofit; carrier route sort; the 5.3¢ was to accommodate nonprofit third class mailers who presort. Gary Chaconas and Dennis Brown of the Bureau of Engraving and Printing engraved the stamp.
  1988 → Scott No. USA 2254.
5. 16.7¢ postage stamp: "Popcorn Wagon", a definitive stamp, depicting a popcorn wagon, "Number 1 Wagon", manufactured by the C. Cretors & Company of Chicago. 16.7¢ was the basic bulk rate.
  1988 → Scott No. USA 2261.
  1988 → Scott No. USA 2261A (imperfect).

100^{th} Anniversary of the Accounting Profession in the United States:

1. 22¢ postage stamp: "CPA."
  1987 → Scott No. USA 2361.

President Reagan's "Take Pride in America" Campaign

1. 14¢ stamped postcard: Depicting a Western Mountain Scene (1987)

Constitution Series

1. 25¢ postage stamp: "Bill of Rights."
  Lettering and calligraphy by Julian Waters.
  1989 → Scott No. 2421.

The Centennial of the "Pledge of Allegiance"

1. 29¢ postage stamp: "I Pledge Allegiance" (1992), depicting an American flag
  1992 → Scott No. USA 2593.
  1992 → Scott No. USA 2593A.
  1993 → Scott No. USA 2594 (re-issue with a red "USA").

Opening of the National Postal Museum Commemoration (1993)
Lou Nolan and Richard W. Schlecht (born 1936), designers

1. 29¢ postage stamp: "Charles Lindbergh Single," depicting a portrait of Lindbergh wearing an aviator hat who was a 20th century airmail pilot, and, in the background, JN-4H "Jenny" bi-plane #38262 (the nation's first mailplane), a 1931 Model A Ford mail truck, and a railway mail car.
  1993 → Scott No. USA 2781.
2. 29¢ postage stamp: "Benjamin Franklin Single", depicting a portrait of Franklin with an 18th century themed printing press (lower right), a mounted mailrider on a galloping horse (upper right), and Independence Hall (lower left foreground), reflecting his career as printer, postmaster and statesmen.
  1993 → Scott No. USA 2779.
3. 29¢ postage stamp: "Civil War Soldier Single", depicting a Civil War era soldier playing a field drum with a 19th century themed mounted Pony Express rider on a galloping horse (upper left background) and Concord stagecoach (lower right foreground).
  1993 → Scott No. USA 2780.
4. 29¢ postage stamp: "California Gold Rush Miner's Letter Single", depicting a letter with four prized stamps laying on top:
  1. 90¢ George Washington (1860; Scott USA 39)
  2. 2¢ Empire State Express (1901; Scott USA 295)
  3. 24¢ Inverted Jenny (1918; Scott C3a)
  4. 65¢ Graf Zeppelin over the Atlantic (1930; Scott C13)
  And, an undated postmark from Milledgeville, Georgia, and a barcode representing contemporary mail processing technology.
  1993 → Scott No. USA 2782.

Traditional and Contemporary Christmas Stamps (pull toys)

1. 29¢ postage stamp: "Christmas Greetings – Toys booklet Multiple"
  1992 → Scott No. USA 2718A.
2. 29¢ postage stamp: "Toy Horse Booklet Single."
  1992 → Scott No. USA 2711.
  1992 → Scott No. USA 2715.
3. 29¢ postage stamp: "Toy Train Engine Booklet Single", depicting a toy locomotive.
  1992 → Scott No. USA 2712.
  1992 → Scott No. USA 2719.
4. 29¢ postage stamp: "Toy Engine Booklet Single", depicting a toy fire pumper.
  1992 → Scott No. USA 2713.
  1992 → Scott No. USA 2716.
5. 29¢ postage stamp: "Toy Steamboat Booket Single", depicting a toy steamboat. Issued October 22, 1992, in Kansas City, home of the National Museum of Toys and Miniatures.
  1992 → Scott No. USA 2714.
  1992 → Scott No. USA 2718.
6. 29¢ postage stamp: "Christmas Stocking."

1994 → Scott No. USA 2872.

Rate Change Series

1. G-rate postage stamp: "Old Glory," depicting an American flag – The G-rate, designated as a 32¢ stamp, "for U.S. Addresses only."
  1994 → Scott No. USA 2881A.

American Design Series (2002–2008)
"The American Design series showcases objects from various regions, eras, and ethnic cultures that combine utility with beauty and function with form".

1. 5¢ postage stamp: "American Toleware," a definitive stamp – by Lou Nolan (illustrator); Derry Noyes (designer, Art Director, typographer); and Donald H. Woo (modeler) – depicting a toleware coffee pot," from the Winterthur Museum (2002, 2004). This stamp is not to be confused with two the 15¢ postage stamps, "Pennsylvania Toleware, Folk Art USA" – from the Folk Art Series – in photogravure by Bradbury Thompson (1911–1995), one depicting a straight spout pot, issued in 1979. (Scott No. USA 1775) and one depicting a curved spout (Scott No. USA 1778). The word "toleware" is French for "painted tin" and, since the 17th century, has bee painted by the Pennsylvania Dutch.
  2002 → Scott No. USA 3612.
  2004 → Scott No. USA 3756.
2. 10¢ postage stamp: "The American Clock," a definitive stamp, depicting the face of a banjo clock made around 1805 by Simon Willard.
  2002
  2003 → Scott No. USA 3757.
  2006 → Scott No. USA 3762.
  2008 → Scott No. USA 3763.
  2008 → Scott No. USA 3763A (untagged).
3. 4¢ postage stamp: "The Chippendale Chair" (2004, 2007, 2014). Nolan's stylized illustration is based on a Chippendale side chair (chair without arms) that is part of a collection in the Diplomatic Reception Rooms, U.S. Department of State in Washington, D.C. The patterned back features spiral ornaments (scrolls) and carvings of a tassel and a shell.
  2004 → Scott No. USA 3755.
  2007 → Scott No. USA 3761.
  2013
  2014 → Scott No. USA 3761A.
4. 1¢ postage stamp: "The Tiffany Lamp" – a definitive stamp, designed by Derry Noyes (aka Derry N. Craig → married to Washington attorney Gregory B. Craig; née Derry Noyes; born 1952) and illustrated by Nolan. The work depicts a lamp designed by Louis Comfort Tiffany (1848–1933), capturing the Art Nouveau movement.
  2003 → Scott No. USA 3758.
  2007 → Scott No. USA 3749.
  2007 → Scott No. USA 3757.
  2008 → Scott No. USA 3749A.
  2008 → Scott No. USA 3758A.
5. 2¢ postage stamp: "Navajo Jewelry," a definitive stamp, featuring a squash blossom necklace. Derry Noyes (art director & typographer); Lou Nolan (illustrator); Donald Hung Woo (born 1954) (modeler) (Note: A modeler is a person who sets-up and/or designs an image for the illustrator to draw upon.) (there was no engraver).
  2004 → Scott No. USA 3719.
  2004 → Scott No. USA 3750.
  2006 → Scott No. USA 3751.
  2006 → Scott No. USA 3752.
  2007 → Scott No. USA 3753.
  2011 → Scott No. USA 3758B.

––––––––––––––––––––

BEP = U.S. Bureau of Engraving and Printing

=== Undesignated art ===
- "Untitled". Artist: Lou Nolan. US Air Force Art Collection. January 1, 1995.
- "SAC". Artist: Lou Nolan – depicting a Boeing B-47 Stratojet in flight.

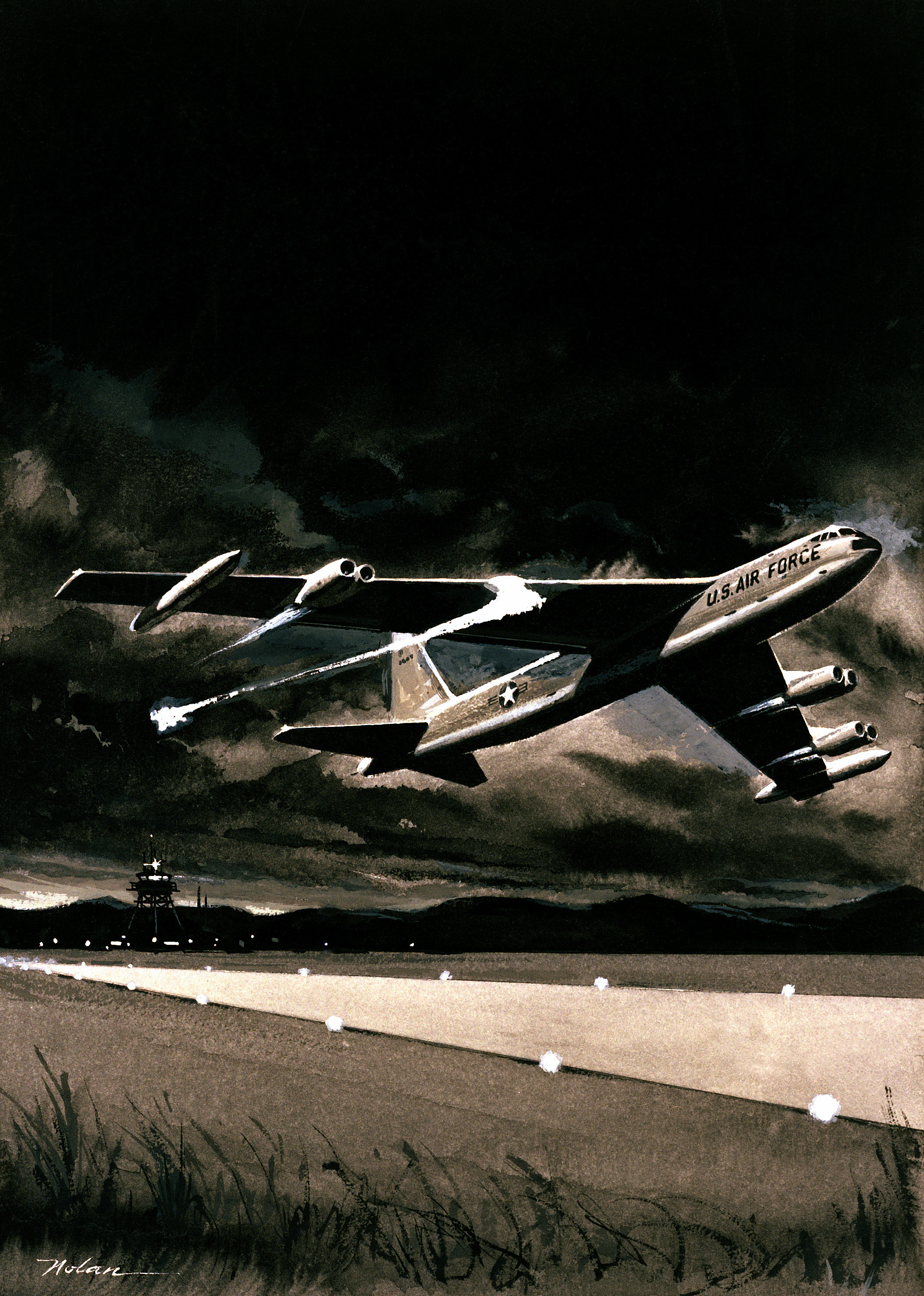
U.S. Air Force Boeing B-47 Stratojet taking off – Lou Nolan, January 1, 1995.

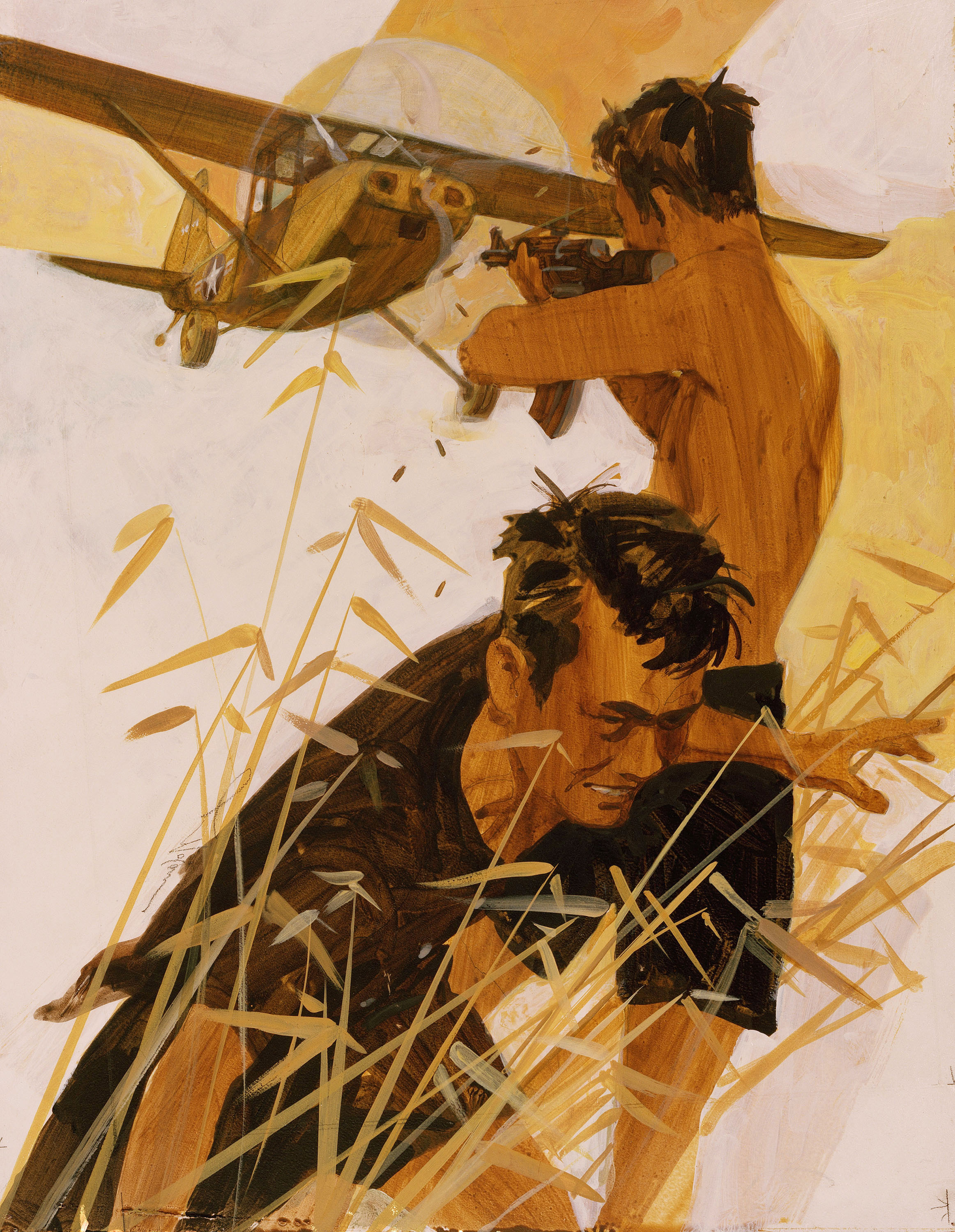
"Untitled" – Lou Nolan, February 20, 1986, U.S. Air Force Art Collection.

== Family ==
Nolan was born to the marriage of Louis James Nolan (1905–1976) and Mary J. White (born 1905). He married twice, first – on June 3, 1950, at Calvary Baptist Church in Washington, D.C. – to Emilie Jean Edwards (maiden; 1926–2017); then – around 1985 – to Sara Louise Danis (maiden; 1940–2001), a graphic designer.

== Affiliations ==
In 1963, Nolan was elected to the board of directors of the Bethesda-Chevy Chase Chapter of the Izaak Walton League.

== Bibliography ==
=== References ===
Books, journals, magazines, papers, articles, and blogs
- "American Clock Stamp". Willard House and Clock Museum. n.d. Archived from the original on May 24, 2006 – via Wayback Machine.
- Bernhardt, Gordon Joel (born 1960) (March 2013). "Jim White". Profiles in Success. Bernhart Wealth Management..
- Bernhardt, Gordon Joel (born 1960) (March 2013). "Jim White". Profiles in Success (Vol. 6). Bernhart Wealth Management. pp. 157–159. ISBN 978-0-9849-5726-2.
- Bizony, Piers, ed. (2020). The Art of NASA – The Illustrations That Sold the Missions. MotorBooks (publisher). pp. 160–161 – via Google Books. ISBN 978-0-7603-6807-7; ISBN 978-0-7603-6808-4 (digital); ISBN 0-7603-6808-2; ISBN 978-0-7603-6807-7 (hardcover); OCLC 1239085004 (all editions).
- Capitol Communicator (March 19, 2020). "E. James White, Founder of the E. James White Company, Has Died". Washington, D.C Paul Duning (né Theodore Paul Dunning, Jr.; born 1956) (co-founder & publisher). Phil Rabin (co-founder & editor)
- DCRA (February 16, 1965). Nolan, Duffy & White, Inc.
Incorporated February 16, 1965 → Dissolved December 30, 1971, after merger → Jurisdiction: Washington, D.C. → DCRA File No. 650258
- Dora, Danica (June 8, 2015). Together in Space (album). Nashville, Tennessee.
- Hall, Ken (May 2004). "Ken's Korner" (column) – "4¢ Stamp Honors Chippedale Design". Antiques & Collecting. 109 (3). Chicago: Lightner Publishing Corporation: 19, 25 (the magazines Antiques & Collecting and Collector, around 2011, merged into one publication, and henceforth has been called Treasures). LCCN 94-641297; LCCN 85-645630; ISSN 0884-6294; ISSN 0162-1033; OCLC 28904979 (all editions); ProQuest 10840818 (subscription required) (ProQuest Research Library database).
- Harscher, Debra, NCCS (Navy Counselor, Senior Chief Petty Officer, U.S. Navy), ed. (January 1995). Chapter 7: "Public Affairs – Collateral Material Classifications" Navy Counselor 1 & C (Recruiter) (PDF) (NAVEDTRA 14172). Nonresident Training Course. U.S. Navy. pp. 7–14. Re: RAD numbers.
- Kerrod, Robin (1990). The Art of NASA – Paintings From the NASA Space Art Program. London: Prion (publisher). LCCN 91-155814; ISBN 1-8537-5077-8, 978-1-8537-5077-9; OCLC 499743481 (all editions).
- Linn's Stamp News; Bigalke, Jay A. (born 1982) (May 18, 2009). "Not Really a New Tiffany Lamp Stamp". 82 (whole no. 4203): 14 – via Dennis Roy Abel – Stamps for Collectors, LLC, Savage, Minnesota. ISSN 0161-6234.
- Lyter, Paul, NGAUS (July 1976). "National Guard Heritage Encampment". The Air Reservist. Special Bicentennial Issue. 28 (4). Washington, D.C.: Government Printing Office (printer). Headquarters, United States Air Force (publisher): 12–13 – via Google Books. ISSN 0002-2535; OCLC 472023183 (all editions).
- National Guardsman, The. National Guard Association of the United States – via Google Books. ISSN 0027-9412; OCLC 482025424 (all editions).
1. Nolan, Lou (cover art) (March 1960). "Cover". 14 (3). National Guard Association of the United States: cover.
2. Nolan, Lou (cover art) (June 1961). "Cover". 15 (6): cover.
3. Nolan, Lou (cover art) (June 1963). "Our Cover" (PDF). 17 (6): cover ("Artist Lou Nolan dramatically illustrates the long way the Nation has come from the Minuteman of 1775 to the Globe-ranging, missile-armed Guardsman of 1963")
4. "Staff" – "Louis James Nolan". 19 (1). January 1965: cover.
5. Nolan, Lou (cover art) (August–September 1976). "Cover" (Special Issue). 30 (8): cover.
6. Nolan, Lou (cover art) (October 1976). "Cover". 30 (9): cover → Nolan's cover illustration is a composite of a selected sketch or sketches by Amos Doolittle (1754–1832).
7. Walker, Luther Loneith, Capt. (born 1939), ed. (October 1976). "Letters to the Editor". 30 (9): 50.
- Nazar, Richard Joseph (born 1963) (ed.); Plate Number Coil Study Group (compiler) (November 1994). The 1995 Plate Number Coil Catalog (PDF) (8th ed.). Somerset, New Jersey: Nazar Publications, Inc. (publisher).
- Nolan, Kerry Michael (born 1956) (April 5, 2010). "Navy Poster Art". Navy History Blog. U.S. Naval Institute → Kerry Michael Nolan is a son of Louis James Nolan, Jr.
- Nolan, Lou (poster artist) (1976). "Our American Eagles". Archived the Milton Caniff Collection (poster). Billy Ireland Cartoon Library & Museum – via OhioLINK. Map-case AC B2 80. Poster for the United States Air Force Bicentennial celebration. OCLC 18096493.
- Nolan, Lou (designer & illustrator); Grumm, Fred (art director); Maroon, Fred (1924–2001) (photographer); Fankhauser, Hank (copywriter) (1977). "United States Navy: 'Navy Pilot'". The Federal Design Response [Exhibit]. Federal Design Council, American Institute of Graphic Arts. p. 48 – via Internet Archive. LCCN 8046838 8-46838; OCLC 6332332 (all editions).
- OpenCorporates (February 16, 1965). "Nolan, Duffy & White, Inc.".
Incorporated February 16, 1965 – Dissolved December 30, 1971, after merger → Jurisdiction: Washington, D.C. → Extuid 2723009 → DCRA File No. 650258
- Plate Number Coil Collectors Club, American Philatelic Society Affiliate #185 Retrieved July 22, 2021.
1. PNC3: "3.4¢ School Bus (BEP)". June 8, 1985. Scott Nos. 2123 & 2123A.
2. PNC3: "17¢ Dog Sled (BEP)". August 20, 1986. Scott Nos. 2135 & 2135A.
3. PNC3: "5¢ Milk Wagon (BEP)". September 25, 1987. Scott No. 2253.
4. PNC3: "16.7¢ Popcorn Wagon (BEP)". July 7, 1988. Scott Nos. 2261 & 2261A.
5. PNC3: "5.3¢ Elevator (BEP)". September 16, 1988. Scott No. 2254.
6. PNC3: "5¢ American Toleware". May 31, 2002. Scott Nos. 3612 & 3612A.
7. PNC3: "1¢ Tiffany Lamp". March 1, 2003. Scott No. 3758.
8. PNC3: "10¢ American Clock". August 4, 2006. Scott No. 3762.
9. PNC3: "4¢ Chippendale Chair". July 19, 2007. Scott No. 3761.
10. PNC3: "1¢ Tiffany Lamp – Reprint". June 7, 2008. Scott No. 3758A.
11. PNC3: "10¢ American Clock – Reprint". July 15, 2008. Scott Nos. 3763 & 3763A.
12. PNC3: "2¢ Navajo Jewelry". February 12, 2011. Scott No. 3758B.
13. PNC3: "4¢ Chippendale Chair (Reprint)". January 2, 2014. Scott No. 3761A.
- USS Savo Island Picture Book; Anderson, William Donald, Captain (1901–1987), Commanding (authorized by); Benton, Brantford B., Lieutenant USNR (né; Brantford Walsh Benton; 1908–1984) (ed.). Anderson, William (1946). "Battle Baby: A Pictorial History of the Escort Carrier U.S.S. Savo Island (CVE-78)". World War Regimental Histories. Baton Rouge: Army & Navy Publishing Company. LCCN 48-22631; OCLC 31184880 (all editions); OCLC 1103174969 (all editions); OCLC 81267976 (all editions).
News media
- Chicago Tribune; Winick, Les (né Lester Winick; 1927–2015) (September 20, 1987). "CIA Employees Are Trying to Cash In on a Stamp Error". Books. Vol. 141, no. 263 (Final ed.). p. 10 (section 14).
- Chicago Sunday Tribune – Magazine of Books; Butcher, Fanny (1888–1987) (July 4, 1954). "Lusty, Heroic John Paul Jones" (book review). pp. 3 (article) & cover (Nolan's illustration) (Part 4) – via Newspapers.com.
- Daily Press; Kolcum, Harry (né Edward Harold Kolcum; 1926–1994) (July 11, 1954). "That Redoubtable Mariner Captain John Paul Jones" (book review). Vol. 59, no. 183. Newport News, Virginia – via Newspapers.com.
- Evening Star, The (July 8, 1926). "Births Reported: Louis J. and Mary J. Nolan. Boy". Vol. 30018 (Sunday morning ed.). Washington, D.C. p. 9 – via Chronicling America. LCCN sn83-45462; ISSN 2331-9968; OCLC 2260929 (all editions).
- Evening Star, The (December 20, 1963). "Two Chapters of Waltonians Elect Officers". Vol. 111, no. 354 (Sunday morning ed.). Washington, D.C. p. D4 – via GenealogyBank.com, a subsidiary of NewsBank. LCCN sn83-45462; ISSN 2331-9968; OCLC 2260929 (all editions).
- Federal News Service – Including US State News (March 16, 2007). "Postal Service Issues Three-Cent Silver Coffee Pot and One-Cent Tiffany Lamp Stamps" (wire feed). Iceland, Washington, D.C. ProQuest 471379026. ProQuest 471379026 (ProQuest Research Library database).
- New York Times, The; Dunn, John F. (August 17, 1986). "Stamps – New From Alaska" (Late ed. – East Coast). Vol. 135, no. 46869. p. 31 (Section 2: "Arts and Leisure") – via TimesMachine. ISSN 0362-4331; ProQuest 425971089 (article) (U.S. Newsstream database → also Permalink – via TimesMachine.).
- Washington Post; McAllister, Bill (né William Howard McAllister III; born 1941) (August 21, 1987). "Stamps & Coins" (column) – "Collectible Postcards" (Final ed.). p. 62 (section N – Weekend).. ISSN 0190-8286; ProQuest 306936583 (article) (U.S. Newsstream database).
- Washington Post; McAlister, Bill (né William Howard McAllister III; born 1941) (June 17, 1988). "Stamps & Coins" (column) – "Popcorn Issue Aint Peanuts Bright". ISSN 0190-8286.
- Washington Post; McAlister, Bill (né William Howard McAllister III; born 1941) (September 16, 1988). "Stamps & Coins" (column) – "Monumental First Hearst". ISSN 0190-8286.
- Washington Post; McAlister, Bill (né William Howard McAllister III; born 1941) (August 25, 1989). "Stamps & Coins" (column) – "Bill of Rights Done Bright" (Final ed.). p. 58 (section N – Weekend). ISSN 0190-8286; ProQuest 307161735 (article) (U.S. Newsstream database).
- Washington Post; McAlister, Bill (né William Howard McAllister III; born 1941) (October 21, 1994). "Stamps & Coins" (column) – "A Seer of Stamps" (Final ed.). p. 70 (section N). ISSN 0190-8286; ProQuest 307808777 (article) (U.S. Newsstream database).
- Washington Post (December 25, 2001). "Obituaries: Sara Louise Danis Nolan, Graphics Designer" (Final–2 ed.). p. 6 (section B – Metro). ISSN 0190-8286; ProQuest 409188103 (article) (U.S. Newsstream database).
- Washington Post; Holley, Joe (November 1, 2008). "Louis James Nolan, Jr., Commercial Artist". Metro (obituary). p. 11 (section C). ISSN 0190-8286; ProQuest 410223422 (article) (U.S. Newsstream database).
- Washington Post (April 5, 2020). "E. James White". Legacy.com (obituary). ISSN 0190-8286.
Smithsonian National Postal Museum
- Articles: Smithsonian National Postal Museum.
Transportation Series (1981–1995):
1. "3.4¢ School Bus Single" (1985).
2. "17¢ Dog Sled Coil Single" (1986).
3. "5¢ Milk Wagon Single" (1987).
4. "16.7¢ Popcorn Wagon Single" (1988).
5. "5.3¢ Elevator Single" (1988).
100th Anniversary of the Accounting Profession in the United States:
1. "29¢ Certified Public Accountants (CPA) Single" (1987).
Constitution Series:
1. "25¢ Bill of Rights Single" (1989).
The Centennial of the Pledge of Allegiance:
1. "29¢ Flag Single" (1992).
2. "29¢ Flag and Oath of Allegiance Booklet Single" (1992).
3. "29¢ Flag and Oath of Allegiance Booklet Single (red "USA")" (1992).
Opening of the National Postal Museum Commemoration (1993):
1. "29-cent National Postal Museum, 1993".
2. "29¢ National Postal Museum block of Four".
3. "29¢ Charles Lindbergh Single" (1993).
4. "29¢ Benjamin Franklin Single" (1993).
5. "29¢ Civil War Soldier Single" (1993).
6. "29¢ California Gold Rush Miner's Letter Single" (1993).
Traditional and Contemporary Christmas Stamps:
1. "29¢ Christmas Greetings – Toys booklet Multiple" (1992).
2. "29¢ Toy Horse Booklet Single" (1992).
3. "29¢ Toy Train Engine Booklet Single" (1992).
4. "29¢ Toy Engine Booklet Single" (1992).
5. "29¢ Toy Steamboat Booket Single" (1992).
6. "29¢ Christmas Stocking Booklet Single" (1994).
American Design Series (2002–2008):
1. "American Design Series 2002–2008".
2. "5¢ American Toleware Single" (2002, 2004).
3. "4¢ Chippendale Chair Single" (2002).
4. "4¢ Chippendale Chair Single" (2007).
5. "10¢ American Clock Single" (2003).
6. "10¢ American Clock Single" (2003).
7. "10¢ American Clock Single" (2006).
8. "10¢ American Clock Single" (2008).
9. "The American Indian in Postage Stamps" – "Navajo Jewelry" (2004).
Government and genealogical archives
- "Notebook - Women Line Officers Assigned To Sea Duty On Hospital Ship". Proceedings. 98 (11/837). United States Naval Institute: 118–127. November 1972 Re: " Pass-Down-the-Line Notes" (p. 127) → "Heritage – Navy Recruiting Aids Facility Poster painting by Lloyd Nolan". ISSN 0041-798X; OCLC 1010522771 (all editions).
- US Navy Muster Rolls. "Muster Rolls of U.S. Navy Ships, Stations, and Other Naval Activities, January 1, 1939 – January 1, 1949". Records of the Bureau of Naval Personnel, 1798–2007 (pdf) (Nolan, Louis James, Jr. → Seaman First Class → Ship: USS Savo Island → Ship Hull No.: CVE 78 → Muster Date: July 1, 1945 → Record Group: 24 → Series ARC ID: 594996 → Series MLR No.: A1 135 → Image 509 → p. 15). Records of the Bureau of Naval Personnel, National Archives at College Park. – via National Archives Catalog → Image 509.
- Untitled; Nolan, Lou (artist) (November 1, 1995). "Untitled" (U.S. Air Force Art Collection). Series: Combined Military Service Digital Photographic Files, 1982–2007. Record Group 330: Records of the Office of the Secretary of Defense, 1921–2008.
- S.A.C.; Nolan, Lou (artist) (November 1, 1995). "S.A.C." Series: Combined Military Service Digital Photographic Files, 1982–2007. Record Group 330: Records of the Office of the Secretary of Defense, 1921–2008.
- Boddie, John Bennett (1880–1965) (1956). "Alexander Hamilton Hilliard" – "(1) Emilie Jean Edwards". Southside Virginia Families. Vol. 2 (of 2). Redwood City, California: Pacific Coast Publishers. p. 253 – via HathiTrust. LCCN 56-604 (1955–1956 ed.); LCCN 66-28239 (1965 ed.; Baltimore, Genealogical Publishing Company); ISBN 978-0-8063-0040-5, 0-8063-0040-X (2008 re-print of 1955 ed.); ISBN 978-0-8063-0041-2, 0-8063-0041-8 (2008 re-print of 1955 ed.); OCLC 1144632945 (all editions); OCLC 999852004 (Vol. 2).
Postal Bulletin
- Postal Bulletin. Retrieved July 22, 2021 – via USPS and US Postal Bulletins Consortium (search link). LCCN 06-5810; ISSN 0364-863X; OCLC 58921525 (all editions).
1. "3.4-Cent School Bus Coil Stamp" (PDF). Vol. 106. May 9, 1985. pp. 13, 17. PB 21513.
2. "Stamp Poster 86–21: Dog Sled Regular Sled" (PDF). Vol. 107. July 31, 1986. p. 5. PB 21577.
3. "5¢ Milk Wagon Coil Stamp" (PDF). Vol. 108. August 27, 1987. p. 23. PB 21634.
4. "Stamp Poster 87–30: Certified Public Accountants Commemorative Stamp" (PDF). Vol. 108. August 27, 1987. p. 19. PB 21634.
5. "Stamp Poster 87–32: Take Pride in America Postal Card" (PDF). Vol. 108. August 27, 1987. p. 25. PB 21634.
6. "Stamp Poster 88–41: Popcorn Wagon Regular Coil Stamp" (PDF). Vol. 109. June 16, 1988. p. 11. PB 21677.
7. "Stamp Poster 88–64: 5.3-Cent Elevator Regular Coil Stamp" (PDF). Vol. 109. September 1, 1988. p. 15. PB 21688.
8. "Stamp Poster 89–29 Drafting of the Bill of Rights Commemorative Stamp" (PDF). Vol. 110. August 31, 1989. pp. 3, 9. PB 21740.
9. "Stamp Announcement 92–28: Pledge of Allegiance Stamp" (PDF). Vol. 113. August 6, 1992. pp. 1, 16. PB 21821.
10. "Stamp Announcement 92–35: Traditional and Contemporary Christmas Stamps" (PDF). Vol. 113. October 15, 1992. pp. 12–14. PB 21826.
11. "Stamp Announcement 92–34: Christmas ATM Stamp" (PDF). Vol. 113. October 15, 1992. p. 14. PB 21826.
12. "Stamp Announcement 94–35: Contemporary, Automatic Teller Machine, and Self-Adhesive Holiday Stamps" – "Contemporary Holiday Stocking" (PDF). Vol. 115. October 13, 1994. pp. 29–30. PB 21878.
13. "Stamp Announcement 95–2: 'G' Old Glory Stamps" (PDF). Vol. 115. December 22, 1994. pp. 26–28. PB 21883.
14. "Stamp Announcement 02–09: American Toleware Definitive Stamp" (PDF). Vol. 123. May 2, 2002. pp. 104–105. PB 22075.
15. "Stamp Announcement 02–51: American Clock Definitive Stamp" (PDF). Vol. 123. December 26, 2002. pp. 93–94. PB 22092.
16. "Stamp Announcement 03–06: Tiffany Lamp Definitive Stamp" (PDF). Vol. 124. February 6, 2003. pp. 67–68. PB 22095.
17. "Stamp Announcement 04–03: Chippendale Chair Definitive Stamp" (PDF). Vol. 125. February 5, 2004. pp. 56–57. PB 22121.
18. "Stamp Announcement 04–18: American Toleware Definitive Stamp" (PDF). Vol. 125. May 27, 2004. pp. 35–36. PB 22129.
19. "Stamp Announcement 04–25: Navajo Jewelry Definitive Stamp" (PDF). Vol. 125. July 22, 2004. pp. 63–64. PB 22133.
20. "Stamp Announcement 05–33: Navajo Jewelry Stamp" (PDF). Vol. 125. December 8, 2005. pp. 59–60. PB 22169.
21. "Stamp Announcement 06–33: American Clock Definitive Stamp" (PDF). Vol. 126. July 6, 2006. pp. 30–31. PB 22184.
22. "Stamp Announcement 07–03: Tiffany Lamp Stamp" (PDF). Vol. 128. February 15, 2007. pp. 32–33. PB 22200.
23. "Stamp Announcement 07–13: Navajo Jewelry Stamp" (PDF). Vol. 128. April 26, 2007. PB 22205.
24. "Stamp Announcement 07–27: Chippendale Chair" (PDF). Vol. 128. June 7, 2007. pp. 92–93. PB 22208.
25. "Stamp Announcement 08–05: Tiffany Lamp" (PDF). Vol. 129. February 14, 2008. p. 63. PB 22226.
26. "Correction of 'Stamp Announcement 08-05: Tiffany Lamp'" (PDF). Vol. 129. March 13, 2008. p. 53. PB 22228.
27. "Stamp Announcement 08-21: Tiffany Lamp" (PDF). Vol. 129. May 8, 2008. pp. 63–64. PB 22232.
28. "Stamp Announcement 08–30: American Clock" (PDF). Vol. 129. June 19, 2008. PB 22235.
29. "Stamp Announcement 09–17: Tiffany Lamp" (PDF). Vol. 130. March 26, 2009. PB 22255.
30. "Stamp Announcement 11–07: Navajo Jewelry" (PDF). Vol. 132. January 27, 2011. pp. 42–43. PB 22303.
31. "Stamp Announcement 14–1: Chippendale Chair Stamp" (PDF). Vol. 134. December 26, 2013. pp. 72–73. PB 22379.
