= Willard Brothers =

All Willard Brothers were born at their modest family farm in Grafton, Massachusetts, successively between 1743 and 1755. Owning independent workshops at Boston, they were the most celebrated clockmakers in the early United States.

== Parents ==
Their parents were Benjamin Willard Sr. and Sarah Brooks. After his last son was born, Benjamin Senior apprenticed in horology craftsmanship, and subsequently he opened a workshop at the farm. All sons learned horology as well, and they grew up while dividing their lives between the farm and the workshop.

Later, all sons became clockmakers who professionally influenced each other strongly. After them, three successive Willard generations were dedicated also to horology.

== Benjamin Willard (1743 to 1803) ==
In 1766, under his father's tutelage, Benjamin Willard Jr. built his first clocks. Later, of all brothers he was the first one who moved to Boston's Roxbury Street, in 1770. Subsequently, he was followed there by both Simon and Aaron. Benjamin Junior's best clocks were tall longcase clocks.

== Simon Willard ==
Among the Willard brothers, Simon Willard was the most renowned clockmaker. In 1788, he moved to Boston and soon regarding his brothers' workshops Simon's business became the leading one.

Initially, Simon Willard's main economical support stemmed from the Tall Clock production but he didn't produce these models longer after 1802 when he patented his Banjo clock and this invention became Simon's main sustenance. Tough, Simon Willard preferred rather to build special great clock models which have had historical significance indeed, whether in galleries, churches, and the like.

Later, by his profession he fraternized also with the most important American politicians. Examples are both Thomas Jefferson and James Madison.

Also, Simon Willard patented many inventions. The most important was the Banjo Clock. This modern compact wall model was widely copied by competing clock manufacturers although for him Willard didn't claim the royalties which should have rightfully corresponded ever.

Indeed, differently from Aaron, Simon Willard wasn't a quite good businessman and after retiring Simon finished just with 500 dollars.

== Aaron Willard (1757 to 1844) ==
In 1785, Aaron Willard moved to Boston's Roxbury Street too. His shop was 400 meters near Simon's one. Aaron achieved a good reputation too. However, rather Aaron preferred to produce standardized clock models in large quantities. At his heyday, Aaron's workshop gathered about thirty workers.

Thus, for Aaron's business Simon's compact Banjo Clock was perfect so Aaron produced them hundredfold. These clocks kept the original Simon's frontal glass style and with their brass mechanism they ran for eight days.

Nonetheless, Aaron's clocks are praised too for their beauty. This is particularly so about his other popular compact model, the Shelf clock. Aaron's cachet was their artistically painted glass panels. However, in auctions nowadays their selling bids are much lower, in comparison to bids for Simon's timepieces.

== Ephraim Willard (1755 to unknown date) ==
Ephraim Willard, the youngest son, was clockmaker leastwise during 20 years. Only a few units of his can be found nowadays.

== Career ==
The Willard brothers made inexpensive, wooden "banjo" clocks that changed the market for domestic clocks in the United States.

== See also ==
- Benjamin Willard
- Simon Willard
- Aaron Willard
- Ephraim Willard
