= Mantel clock =

Small clocks designed to be on shelves

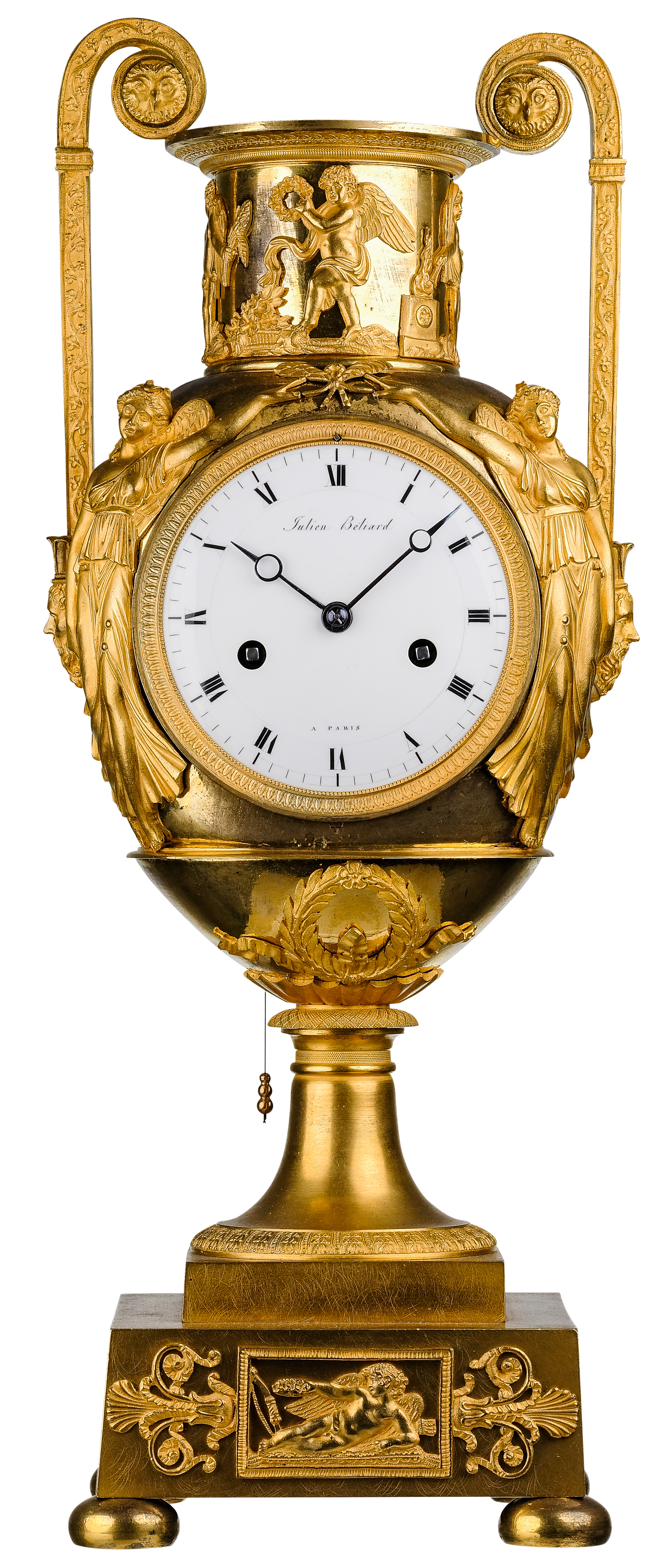
French ormolu mantel clock (around 1800) by Julien Béliard (born 1758 – died after 1806), Paris. The clock case by Claude Galle (1758–1815).

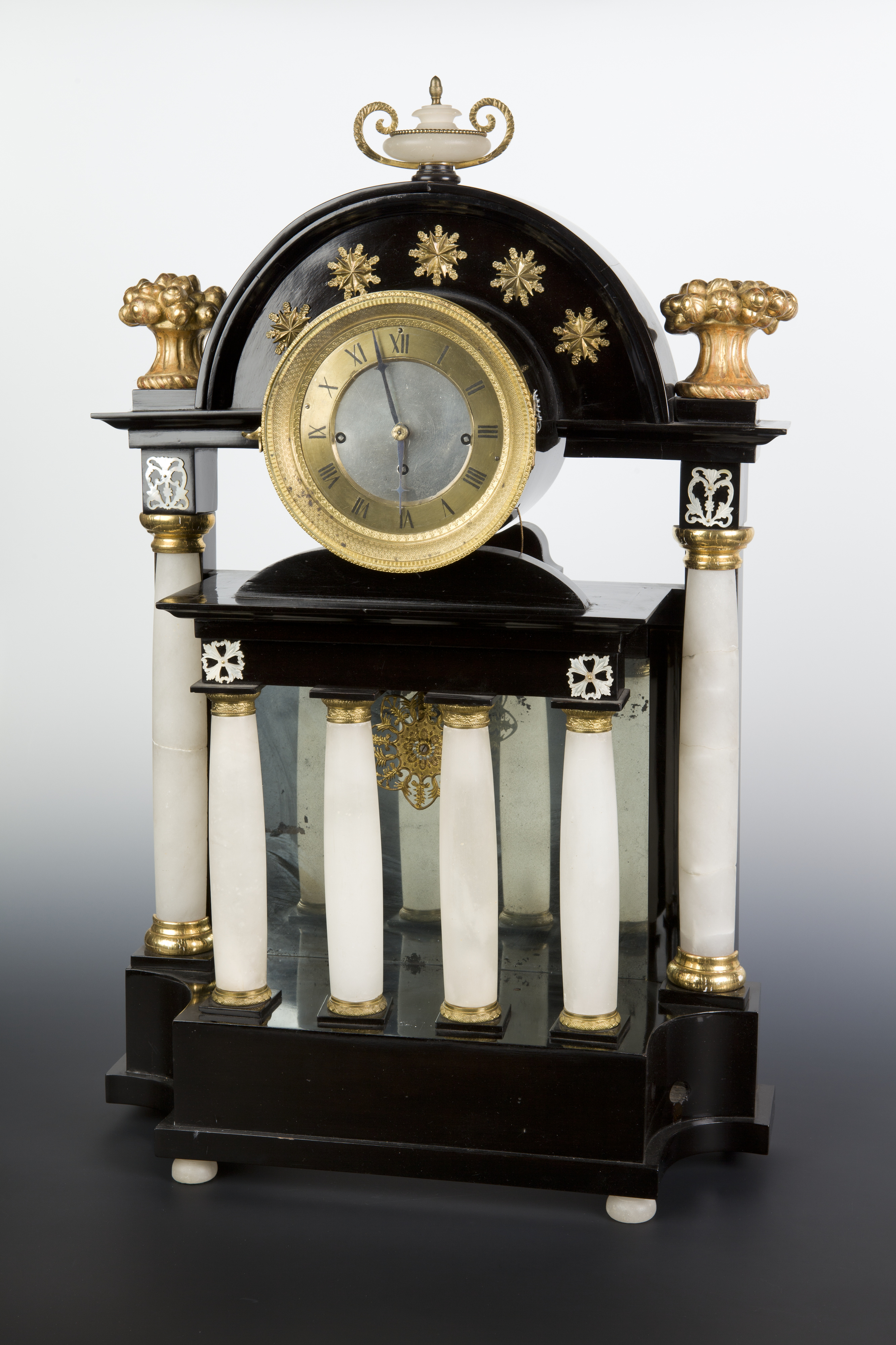
Mantel clock from Austria (around 1840), National Museum in Kraków.

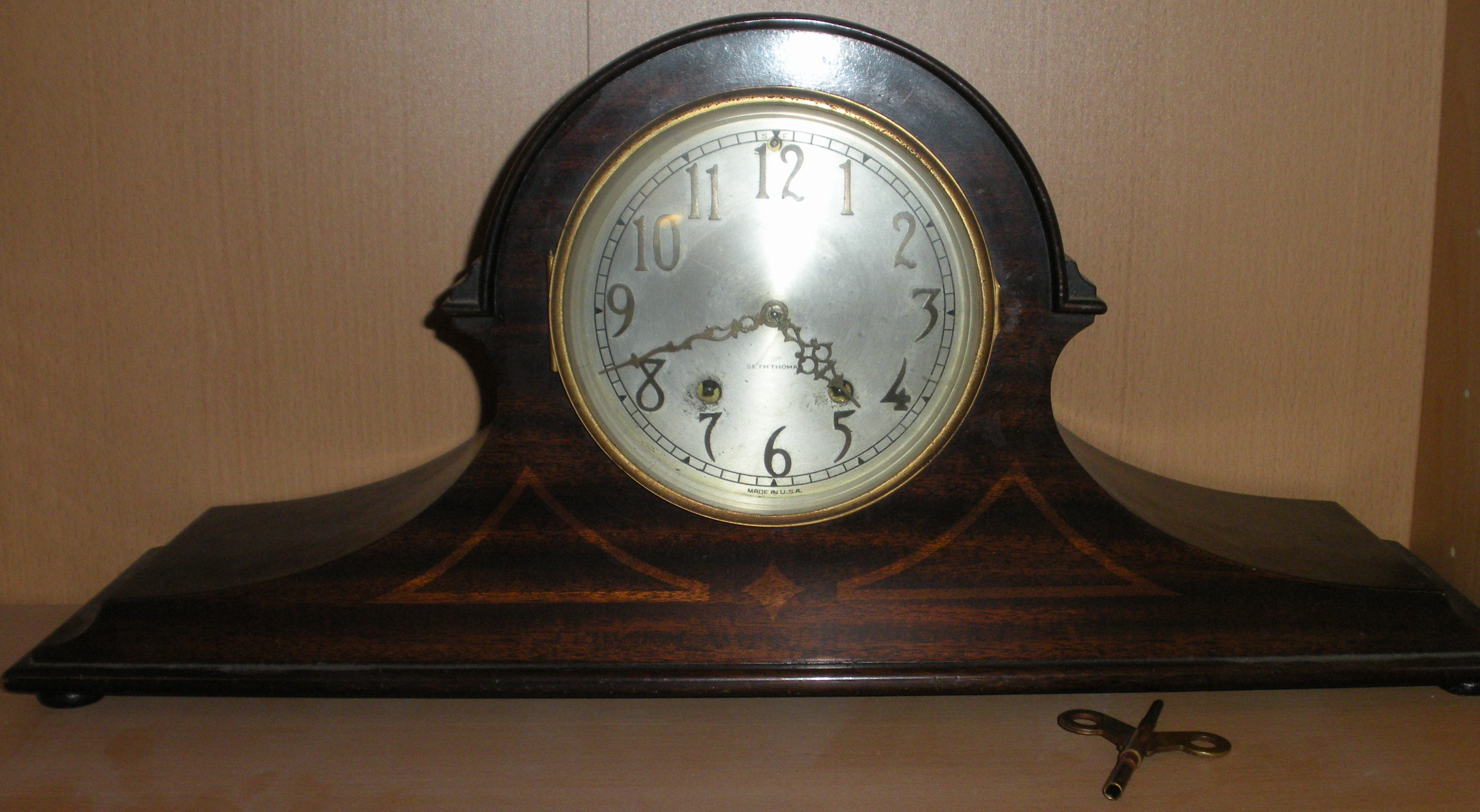
A Seth Thomas American tambour-style mantel clock, dating to around 1930.

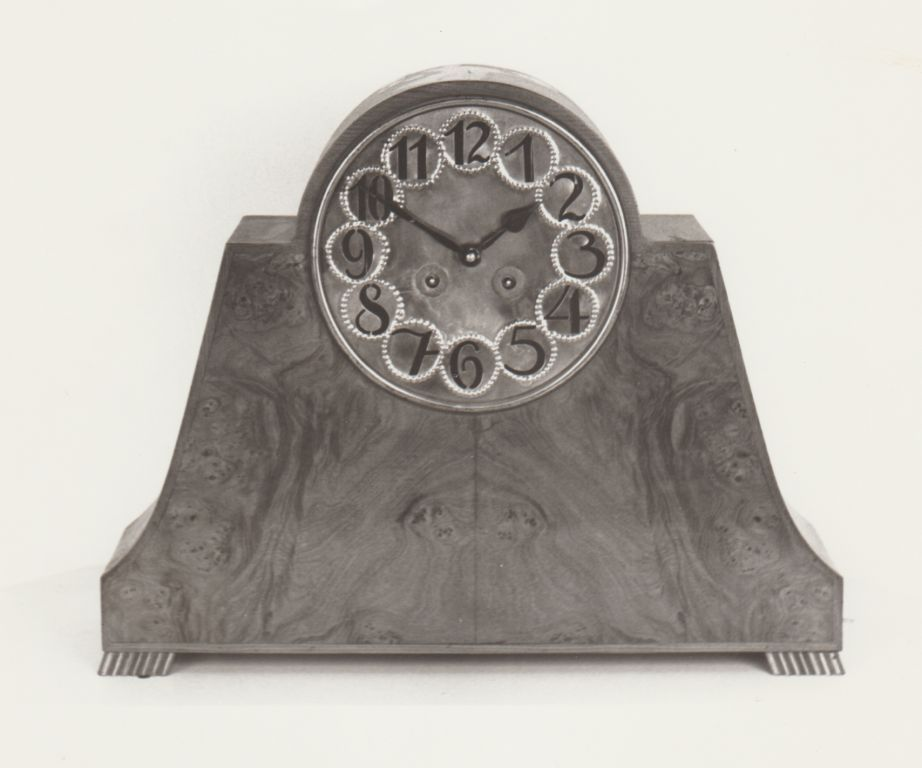
Art Deco Mantel Clock from Amboina Wood around 1930

Mantel clocks—or shelf clocks—are relatively small house clocks traditionally placed on the shelf, or mantel, above the fireplace. The form, first developed in France in the 1750s, can be distinguished from earlier chamber clocks of similar size due to a lack of carrying handles.

These clocks are often highly ornate, decorative works. They are most frequently constructed from any combination of ormolu, porcelain, and wood. One of the most common and valued types of mantel clocks are the French Empire-style timepieces.

Simon Willard's shelf clock (half clock, Massachusetts shelf clock) was a relatively economical clock which was produced by the celebrated Simon Willard's Roxbury Street workshop, in Boston, Massachusetts, around the first decades of the 19th century. Right after inventing the banjo clock, Simon Willard brought the design further, designing the similar Massachusetts shelf clock which was related to the traditional bracket clocks. Simon's new creation ran for eight days.

== Specifications ==
In contrast to wall clocks, whose movements were attached to the back board, the shelf clock had its movement supported by a seat board. In the 1790s in Boston, Simon Willard began selling other standardized shelf clocks. Indeed, it looked like a standard tall clock whose hood and base were directly conjoined and whose body was missing. These models included both a second hand and a calendar dial.

== Georgian era ==
Simon Willard's shelf clocks were weight-driven and some models had an extended base for the weight so they achieved a one-week running period. Also, they had a pinwheel escapement. Their strike mechanism was the rack and snail. The pendulum length could be adjusted through a hole in the clock face at the 12 o'clock position, so it was not necessary to open the case.

== Victorian decorative arts ==
Some later shelf clocks featured two artistically finished glass tablets which were beside the circular dial. The whole clock was mounted on lion paws. Willard's shelf clocks were produced until the 1830s. The Willard Brothers revolutionized the clock manufacturing by both labor division and using multiple previously molded parts. However, it is commonly accepted that historically their clocks were not definitively popular. Instead, Eli Terry popularized the clock ownership among common American people. Nowadays, Simon Willard's clocks are recognized as American masterpieces. As such, they are avidly sought by both antiquarians and museums. A Simon Willard clock in perfect condition can be purchased for anywhere from $50,000 up to $250,000.

== Edwardian ==
Carriage clock

== In popular culture ==
An animated figure of a mantel clock, "Cogsworth", is a character in Disney's films, Beauty and the Beast (1991; animated), voiced by David Ogden Stiers, and Beauty and the Beast (2017; live action/CGI), portrayed by Ian McKellen.

== See also ==
- Bracket clock
- Chariot clock
- Connecticut shelf clock
- French Empire mantel clock
- Lighthouse clock
- Massachusetts shelf clock
- Simon Willard
