= Roger Robinson =

Roger Robinson may refer to:

- Roger Robinson (American football coach) (died 2004), American football player and coach
- Roger Robinson (actor) (1940–2018), American actor
- Roger Robinson (poet), writer and performer
- Roger Robinson (academic) (born 1939), British-born New Zealand academic, essayist, editor, runner, sportswriter and sports commentator
- Roger W. Robinson (1909–2010), cardiologist, educator and researcher
