= Willard House and Clock Museum =

Historic house in Massachusetts, United States

- U.S. National Register of Historic Places
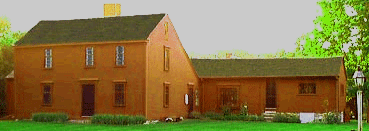
- The Willard Museum and homestead in North Grafton, Massachusetts.
- Location: 11 Willard Street, Grafton, Massachusetts
- Coordinates: 42°14′20″N 71°40′24″W
- Built: 1718
- NRHP reference No.: 82004470
- Added to NRHP: June 1, 1982

The Willard House and Clock Museum is a museum located in North Grafton, Massachusetts, United States. Located at 11 Willard Street, it is located at the former farm homestead of the Willard brothers (Benjamin, Simon, Ephraim, and Aaron). The brothers made clocks there in the late 18th century, before they moved the business to Roxbury, where they became pillars of the emerging American clockmaking industry. The house was built about 1718 and is on the National Register of Historic Places. It stands in a rural setting, in the middle of a field that was part of the Willard farm back in the 18th century.

Like other contemporaneous horologists, the Willard family originally divided its life seasonally, between farming and the clock workshop. Eventually the business became profitable, at which point the house was further enlarged. While in Grafton, Simon, the most innovative and most famous of the Willard brothers, developed his first so called banjo clock, more properly called the "Willard Patent Timepiece", which was patented in 1802.

== Museum founding and history ==
The museum was founded by Dr. Roger W. Robinson and his wife Imogene, collectors of Willard clocks, after they were able to acquire the Willard homestead. For a period in the late 1990s the museum was administered by the National Association of Watch and Clock Collectors, but soon was turned into an independent foundation again, governed by a board made up of representatives of the Willard family, the founding couple, the local community and some horological experts.

The original homestead farmhouse has been added to in recent years and in addition to the original rooms there are now two large galleries. The museum has over 80 Willard clocks, representing the craftsmanship of all the members of the family in the horological trade. While there are several clocks signed Grafton, the exhibits include also clocks made later after the Willard clock enterprise had moved on to Roxbury, Massachusetts, now part of Boston.

Besides hosting the world's most comprehensive collection of Willard timepieces there are many Willard family memorabilia on display. The original house is furnished with period furniture, and in the reconstructed workshop building there is a small collection of historic horological tools in a display showing what Simon Willard's original workshop may have looked like. The majority of clocks are shown in running condition.

There is a small gift shop, and the museum has a small Willard-centric library open to museum members by appointment.

== See also ==
- National Register of Historic Places listings in Worcester County, Massachusetts
