= Simon Willard =

American clockmaker (1753–1848)

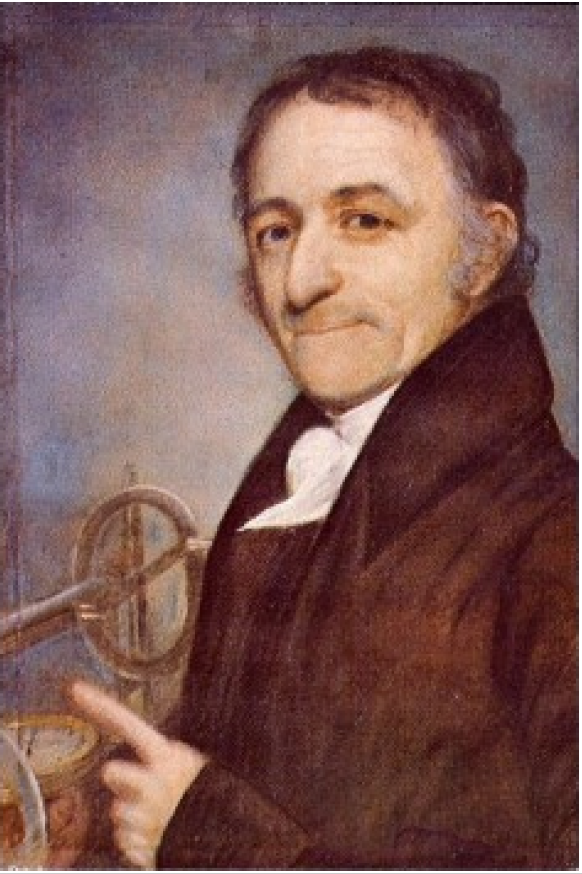
- portrait by Gilbert Stuart, 1807
- Born: April 3, 1753; Grafton
- Died: August 30, 1848; Roxbury
- Occupation: Clockmaker
- Father: Benjamin Willard
- Relatives: Benjamin Willard, Aaron Willard

Simon Willard (April 3, 1753 – August 30, 1848) was an American clockmaker. Simon Willard clocks were produced in Massachusetts in the towns of Grafton and Roxbury, near Boston. Among his many innovations and timekeeping improvements, Simon Willard is best known for inventing the eight-day patent timepiece that came to be known as the gallery or banjo clock.

== Early life ==
Simon Willard – a 2nd great-grandson of the Massachusetts colonist Simon Willard (1605–1676) – was of the fifth Willard generation in America. The original Willard family had arrived in 1634 from Horsmonden, Kent, and they were among the founders of Concord, Massachusetts. Simon Willard's parents were Benjamin Willard (1716–1775) and Sarah Brooks (1717–1775), who were Grafton natives. Like all the Willard brothers, Simon was born on the family farm in Grafton, April 3, 1753. He was the second son; his brothers were Benjamin (1743–1803), Aaron (1757–1844), and Ephraim (1755–1832).

The farm, now operated as the Willard House and Clock Museum, had been built in 1718 by the Willards' third American generation. When Simon Willard was born, the house had just one room. The elder brother, Benjamin, who was 10 years older than Simon, learned horology and opened a workshop adjacent to the house in 1766. It is presumed that the other Willard brothers were taught horology by Benjamin.

At the age of eleven, Simon began to study horology, showing some inherent aptitude for it. A year later, Benjamin hired an Englishman named Morris to teach horology—particularly to Simon. Years afterward, Simon revealed that Morris did not actually know much on the matter and that his brother Benjamin had been his actual mentor. After one more year, Simon built his first tall clock.

Like some other contemporary horologists, the Willards divided their lives between farm chores and the clock business. As the latter became profitable, Benjamin set up a workshop in Lexington, Massachusetts, in 1767. Simon Willard managed his own business in Grafton; some clocks survive bearing the maker's mark "Simon Willard, Grafton."

At his workshop in Grafton, Willard studied the clocks by other makers which were brought to him to be repaired. He extensively experimented, seeking to improve the efficiency of the driving and the regulation parts of those timepieces' parts. The smallest clock of the time was the bracket clock, which influenced Simon's gallery clock, which he patented in 1802. His next creation was the shelf clock, which was based on his gallery clock.

== A pioneer American industry ==
In about 1780, Simon Willard moved to 2196 Roxbury Street in Boston (later known as Washington Street), and set up a four-room workshop on his own. Soon thereafter, his brother Aaron settled in the same neighborhood, a quarter mile away. In 1784, Willard advertised: "Simon Willard opened a shop in Roxbury Street, nearly facing the road which turns off to Plymouth. There, Simon Willard carries on the clockmaking business, in all its branches." Like Aaron, Simon was still interested in perfecting the mechanism of compact clocks. Nonetheless, from the 1790s onward, Willard's workshop also built tall clocks in great numbers while also performing general clock repair.

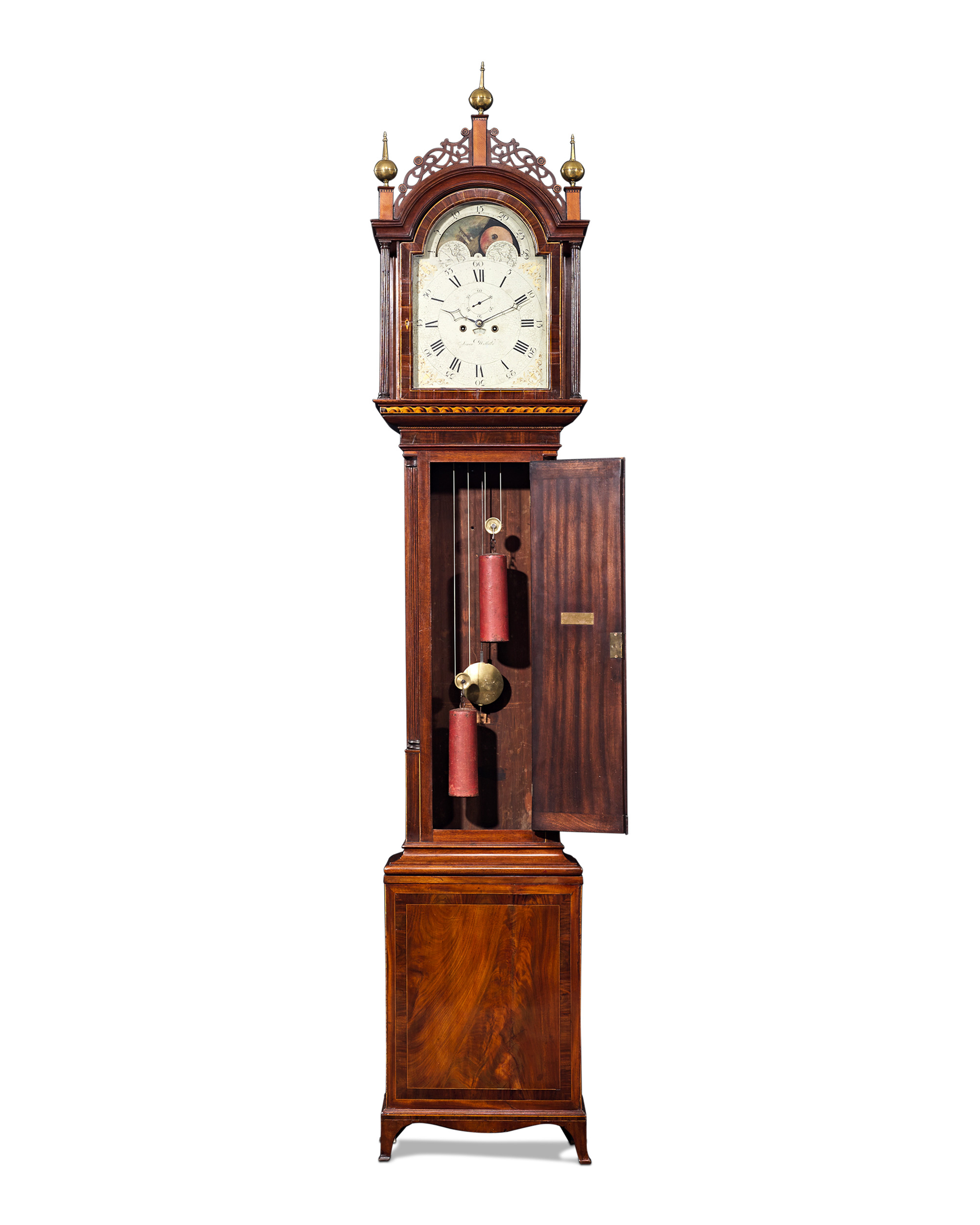
Simon Willard Roxbury Tall Case Clock. Circa 1793. A brass plaque reads “Given by John Goddard as a wedding gift to his son Benjamin Goddard, M. Louisa May, 1793.” Dial signed “Simon Willard.”

Simon and Aaron Willard both combined 18th century knowledge of horology with then-contemporary industrial methods (pre-cast parts, template usage, labor division, standardized production, efficient management). Simon and Aaron Willard each developed an industrial zone, throughout a quarter-mile radius around their shops. By 1807, twenty factories in Boston were sub-contracted to supply parts or materials to the Willard brothers' businesses. This included mahogany (from nearby mills), clock parts (amongst which 20 cabinetmakers were), gilder works, and other important artistic resources. Both Willard brothers utilized the same suppliers and often even shared the same workers.

Since the early United States lacked vital raw materials—most particularly brass—most clockmakers either fabricated their movements from wood or other inferior materials, or they imported parts and entire movements from English suppliers and assembled them into the locally-produced mahogany clock cases. By their quality, the clocks of Boston became a status symbol. Americans were eager to buy clocks for parlors, offices, churches, or other public spaces. Simon Willard's clocks were the most famous in America. However, they were still too expensive for most people. Indeed, Simon Willard preferred to build sumptuous models that featured elaborate artistic details (especially brass trim).

Simon Willard's clocks required considerable skilled handcraftsmanship, and their movements were outstandingly precise. His own skills were considerable, and he was able to file cogwheels without leaving file-marks, producing mechanisms with a margin of error of just thirty seconds over the course of a month. By about 1810, both Simon and Aaron were producing clocks which as good as those being produced in Europe. Simon's workshop produced fewer clocks than did Aaron's, and today the higher prices that Simon's clocks reach at auction reflect their superior refinement.

Simon Willard personally interviewed his customers, evaluating each detail, and he ordered his technicians to extensively test each movement in the customer's own home. Into each clock, Simon included a brochure, instructions, and a written guarantee. Any necessary technical support was included with the timepiece's purchase. Although Simon knew little about advertising, he promoted his workshop through leaflets which were affixed inside the cases. He touted: "These clocks are made in the best manner. They run for a year and they don't wind up. We will give evidence that it is much cheaper to buy new clocks than to buy old or second hand clocks. Simon Willard warrants all his clocks." Nonetheless, over the years his maker's signature has occasionally become lost or obscured from his clocks.

== The clocks ==
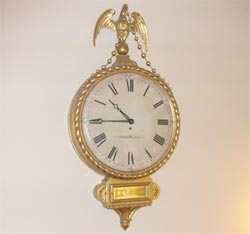
A c. 1810 Simon Willard gallery clock in the lobby of the West Wing of the White House.

=== Longcase clocks ===
Simon Willard built longcase clocks which were quite sumptuous, being adorned with many fine details.

In the most expensive tall clock units, the mahogany cases had a mid-18th century English style and, bearing exactly similar English brass mechanisms all, their case complexity determined their final price. Distinctively for Willard's workshop, above the clock's top fretwork, three pedestals were, on which two spherical finials and a large bird figure were mounted. In addition, like Aaron, Simon built a glass dial door, whose top had a half arch shape. Onto the dial, Boston painters painted different motifs. Also, with few extra mechanism, amusing wheels with animated figures were featured on the dial, enticing the customer interest effectively.

During his career, Willard manufactured 1,200 tall models. However, after 1802, in which the gallery clock was finally patented, he spurned the manufacture of the tall clock, which was thereafter produced only by special commission.

=== Patent Timepiece, or "banjo" clocks ===
Simon Willard invented the Patent Timepiece, later called the "banjo" clock, at Roxbury. It was America's first commercially successful wall clock. It was an innovative design. It was the first American eight-day wall clock, the first American wallclock to have the pendulum suspended in front of the weight in the case, and the first American wallclock to have the weight attached to a pulley. The brass clock mechanism was reduced to a much smaller size, therefore saving brass which was in scarce supply in the early 19th century. Its shape was an imitation of the traditional wheel barometers. Early Patent Timepieces were built by hand, to order. By 1805 the clockworks, and standard cases, could be produced in quantity, reducing the cost of the clock.

Its small size meant a much lower price of 30 dollars, although this was still a large amount of money. Nonetheless, while American consumerism was arising, Simon's Patent Timepiece revolutionized the clock industry, becoming the most popular clock in the United States, whereas Europe lacked some counterpart of it.

Willard patented its creation quite late (1802) but most competitors of Simon dodged this document, reaping much money with their own versions of the Patent Timepiece. However, Simon never filed a demand against such usage. After 1802, in Simon's workshop, the smaller Banjo and shelf clocks were the bread and butter models while Simon pursued his other great projects, throughout the United States. Eventually, Willard's workshop manufactured 4,000 small timepieces (Banjo and shelf clocks).

Since its patenting, the Patent Timepiece remained with the same original design. Typically, they were surrounded by glass tablets, which were reversely painted with neoclassical motifs. Additionally, Willard expanded the Banjo clock in accordance with the patent, making much larger "seconds beating" regulators.

=== The shelf clock ===
Before creating the Banjo model, Simon designed a shelf clock (1780s, Grafton). It was similar to the tall model, with its original hood and base, but lacking its middle body. The shortened shelf clocks had lower prices, too, and they were commercially successful. Shelf models were produced until approximately 1830.

=== The lighthouse clock ===
A unique Empire lighthouse clock in mahogany case, at the White House library.

In 1818 he invented and patented a type of mantel clock, known as the lighthouse clock and regarded as the first alarm clock produced in America. Originally known as the "Patent Alarm Timepiece", they have become known as lighthouse clocks (a 20th-century term) for their obvious similarities. The design of the cases were based on the Classical art then in vogue; Neoclassicism and Empire. Some of these clocks, however, are less formal and reflect the vernacular interest in painted furniture, particularly Windsor chairs.

It is worth mention, an unusual exemplary displayed in one of the bookshelves of the White House library, made by the clockmaker to commemorate the visit of the Marquis de Lafayette to the United States in 1824-25. A likeness of Lafayette appears in a medallion on its base.

== Renowned work ==
=== United States Senate (1801) ===
For the United States Capitol in Washington, the Senate requested Simon Willard to build a large gallery clock. Subsequently, he was invited both to set the clock up and to show its working.

Eventually, this trip had particular importance because Simon Willard became acquainted with President Thomas Jefferson. After that they became close friends.

=== Thomas Jefferson (1801–1802) ===
Among their first correspondence, in 1801 Thomas Jefferson alerted Simon Willard that his banjo timepiece hadn't yet been patented. Subsequently, on November 25, 1801, Willard made his application to the US Patent Office. The patent was both granted and issued on February 8, 1802. It was signed by President Jefferson, Secretary of State James Madison, and Attorney General Levi Lincoln.

In subsequent years, Simon Willard visited Thomas Jefferson at his home, Monticello, near Charlottesville, Virginia. There they held many conversations. On one occasion, Willard was Thomas Jefferson once asked Willard to dismantle a French clock and put it back together again, and while Willard was busy, Jefferson spoke to him about a recent proposal for a treaty. Upon noticing that Willard wasn't interested, Jefferson scolded Willard, telling him that every good citizen should care about political matters. Willard responded, "doubtless every man should be learned and skillful enough to take up any branch of business that is offered to him," and got up to leave the room without putting the clock back together. Jefferson told Willard to resume his work, to which Willard responded, "you could do that." Jefferson replied, "but I cannot." Willard finally said, "you cannot put the wheels of a clock together, yet you expected me to know all about treatises." Jefferson saw Willard's point, and took Willard to chop a young tree down. Subsequently, Jefferson transformed it into a cane. It was given a silver mount that read: "Thomas Jefferson to Simon Willard, Monticello."

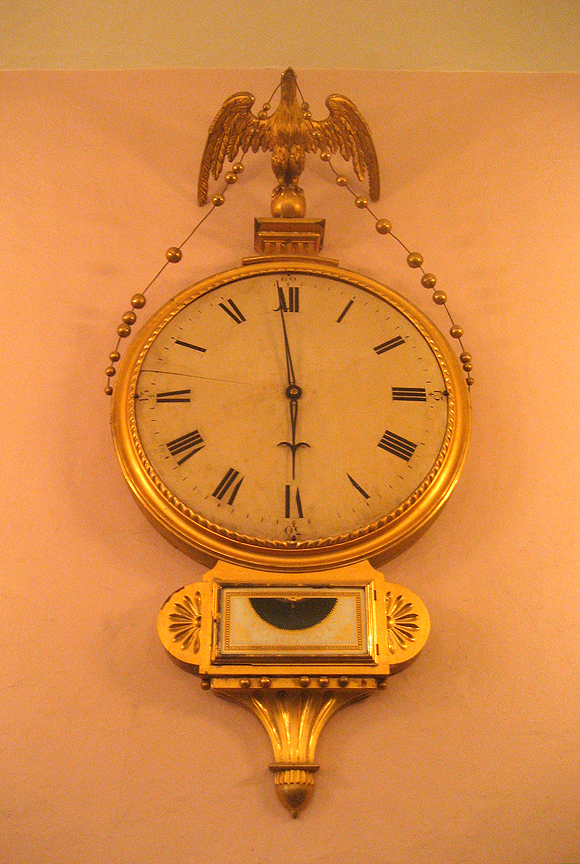
Old South Meeting House's Willard gallery clock, now at Old South Church.

=== Old South Meeting House ===
Minister Joseph Eckley and the congregation of Old South Meeting House in Boston, the site of planning for the Boston Tea Party, commissioned Willard to build a carved and gilded gallery clock to hang opposite the pulpit on the balustrade of the room's south gallery. The clock was capped with a spread eagle, carved in high relief and gilded, and measures 32" in height. The clock was delivered c. 1805, and remained within the meeting house until 1872, when the congregation moved to Old South Church in Boston's Back Bay. A replica has since replaced the original clock within the Old South Meeting House, now a museum on Boston's Freedom Trail.

=== Harvard College ===
For 50 years, Willard was responsible for the periodic maintenance of all clocks at Harvard College in Cambridge, Massachusetts. Additionally, he oversaw Harvard's management of its clocks. Willard presented two clocks to Harvard. One was a tall-case clock; the other was a wall-mounted regulator clock that was installed in a room near University Hall.

A particular incident relates to Harvard's Great Orrery which was malfunctioning. Many craftsmen had unsuccessfully attempted to repair it, until finally Harvard's authorities offered an important reward to Simon if he was able to fix it. For days, Willard analyzed the device. He fixed the orrery by drilling a hole and fastening a rivet. The satisfied authorities asked: "Now, Mr. Willard. How much do we owe you?" Willard simply answered: "Oh. About a ninepence will do, I guess."

=== The University of Virginia (1826) ===
In 1826, Thomas Jefferson requested that Simon Willard build a clock for the University of Virginia at Charlottesville. The clock was to be a turret one and would be placed into the university's rotunda. Jefferson provided all of the clock's plans and specifications. According to these plans, Willard precisely assembled all the clock's pieces. The clock was installed in 1827. Jefferson, however, did not live to see the operating clock because he died in July, 1826. In 1895 a blaze destroyed both the university's building and Willard's clock.

=== Former President James Madison (1827) ===
At his home, Montpelier, in Orange, Virginia, former President Madison received Simon Willard. Madison gifted Willard with a second illustrious cane. Its mounting was silvered, and it read "Presented by James Madison, Ex-President of the United States, to Simon Willard, May 29, 1827."

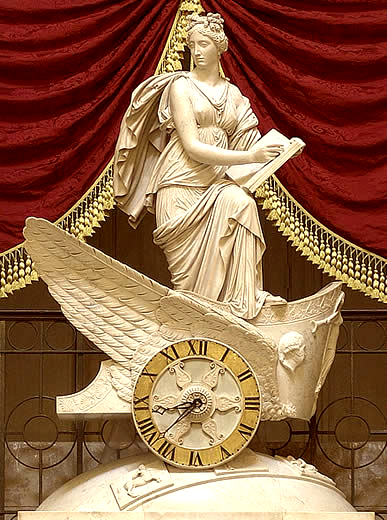
Carlo Franzoni's 1819 sculptural chariot clock, the Car of History depicting Clio, muse of history, recording the proceedings of the house. Fitted with a clock mechanism by Simon Willard in 1837.

=== United States Capitol (1837) ===
After an official request, in 1837 the last two of Simon Willard's important works were again destined for the United States Capitol. Although Willard was already 84 years old, he travelled to personally install both.

One clock was placed into the Old Senate Chamber but was later installed in the Old Supreme Court Chamber. The other was a bare mechanism, designed to fit into the preexisting case sculpted by Carlo Franzoni in 1819 and titled "Car of History"; it depicts Clio, the Greek muse of history in a chariot. It is located above the east entrance to the old chamber of the House of Representatives, now called National Statuary Hall. Both clocks are still operational.

== Inventions ==
The gallery, or banjo, clock had been invented years before, in Grafton, but its patent was issued in 1802. The original model had been called the Grafton wall clock. Later, it was also known as the Improved Timepiece. In 1816, its patent expired.

Immediately after arriving to Boston, Willard developed a movable mechanism to turn meat on a spit, the roasting jack, which was specifically designed for outdoor fireplaces. For it, he reduced the traditional English Lantern clock, simplifying its components. Willard's clock jack was patented, on July 2, 1764, and the document was inked by John Hancock.

The third clock which was patented by Willard was the Patent Alarm Timepiece, which was also known as the Lighthouse and which was similar to the English Skeleton Timepiece.

== Marriages ==
=== Hannah Willard ===
Simon Willard married Hannah Willard on November 29, 1776. She was a 20 years old Grafton native. Their lone son was born in 1777, on February 6, and he was named Isaac Watts Willard.

=== Mary Bird ===
In 1787, Simon Willard married again, to Mary Bird, a 24-year-old Boston native. Of their sons, both Benjamin and Simon continued their father's craft.

Succeeding Willard generations continued successfully as horologists. Beginning in 1828, Simon Willard Jr. (1795–1874) apprenticed in horology at his father's shop; he subsequently established his own workshop in Boston. Also, he specialized in both watches and chronometers, while his foremost jobs were Harvard's astronomical clock and the astronomical regulator which standardized the time for all New England's railroads.

== Last years ==
In 1839, Simon Willard retired. He sold his business to Elnathan Taber, his apprentice. Furthermore, Taber received the business' name too.

On August 30, 1848, Simon Willard died in Boston. He was 95 years old. Because of his commercial traits, Simon finished his life with just five hundred dollars. However, simultaneously all other competing clock manufacturers had benefitted from producing the Banjo Clock massively, although the corresponding royalties were never claimed by Willard.

== Legacy ==
- Nowadays, Simon Willard's clocks are recognized as American masterpieces. As such, they are avidly sought by both antiquarians and museums. In perfect condition, a Simon Willard's clock is usually sold from $50,000 up to $250,000.
- The Willard brothers revolutionized clock manufacturing by both division of labor and by using multiple previously molded parts. However, it is commonly accepted that historically their clocks weren't definitively popular. Instead, Eli Terry popularized clock ownership, among common American people.

== Museums ==
=== Willard House and Clock Museum ===
The Grafton farm which held the original Willard family's workshop is open to the public and has become a museum, the Willard House and Clock Museum, which exhibits over 90 original clocks and many Willards' heirlooms too.

=== Old Sturbridge Village ===
The J. Cheney Wells Clock Gallery is located at Old Sturbridge Village, Sturbridge, Massachusetts. The 122-clock collection ranges from 1725 up to 1825. Some pieces are valuated above hundreds of thousands of dollars. The collection features several clocks attributed to Simon Willard.

=== National Watch and Clock Museum ===
The National Watch and Clock Museum in Columbia, Pennsylvania, houses several Simon Willard clocks.

=== Dedham Historical Society ===
The Dedham Historical Society in Dedham, Massachusetts, owns a Chippendale brass-mounted mahogany astronomical wall clock by Simon Willard: Engraving date 1780-81; perpetual calendar begins 1780.

== Simon Willard's US postage stamp ==
On January 24, 2003, with its American Design Series, the US Postal Service issued a commemorative 10 cent stamp which features a Banjo clock, thus remembering Simon Willard. The stamp — designed by Derry Craig (née Derry Noyes; born 1952 → wife of Washington lawyer Gregory B. Craig) — is a rendering of the dial, or face, of Willard's Banjo Clock, from a watercolor painting by Lou Nolan (né Louis James Nolan; 1926–2008), late of McLean Virginia. The stamp was re-issued July 15, 2008, three months before Nolan died.

== Apprentices ==
- Junior Daniel Munroe
- Levi Hutchins
- Abel Hutchins

== Bibliography ==
=== References linked to notes ===
- "American Clock" (10¢ postage stamp of Simon Willard's Banjo Clock). United States Postal Service. 2003. Archived from the original on November 30, 2006 – via Wayback Machine.
- Dyer, Walter Alden (1878–1943) (June 1915). "The Willards and Their Clocks". Country Life in America. 28 (2). Garden City, New York: Doubleday, Page & Company: 44–47 – via Google Books. ISSN 0011-0175; OCLC 1042918985 (all editions).
- Dyer, Walter Alden (1878–1943) (October 1915). "The Willards and Their Clocks". Early American Craftsmen. New York: The Century Company. pp. 133–161 – via Google Books. LCCN 15-22279; OCLC 422878 (all editions) (book); OCLC 852406757 (Chapter 6).
- Jackman, Bob (October 1, 2002). "Federal and Empire Treasures: The Lighthouse Clocks of Simon Willard". Antiques and the Arts Weekly. Newtown, Connecticut: Bee Publishing Company. Archived from the original on March 19, 2006 – via Wayback Machine. OCLC 8901208 (all editions).
- Old Sturbridge Village (n.d.). "Early History of Old Sturbridge Village". Sturbridge, Massachusetts. Archived from the original on September 10, 2007 – via Wayback Machine.
- Pope, Charles Henry (1841–1918) (compiler and editor) (1915). Willard Genealogy – Sequel to Willard Memoir. Boston: The Willard Family Association. p. 280 – via Google Books. Materials gathered chiefly by Joseph Willard (1798–1865) and Charles Wilkes Walker (1849–1927). LCCN 15-27575; OCLC 36164693 (all editions).
1. "Benjamin Willard". pp. 69–70.
2. "Benjamin Willard". pp. 137–138.
3. "Simon Willard". pp. 139–140.
4. "Ephraim Willard". p. 140.
5. "Aaron Willard". pp. 140–141.

=== General references ===
- Cheney, Robert C.; Zea, Philip M. (born 1953) (Winter 1992). "Elegant Faces & Mahogany Cases: Clocks By The Willard Family". Clock Making in New England, 1725–1825: An Interpretation of the Old Sturbridge Village Collection. Old Sturbridge Village. LCCN 92-27611; ISBN 978-0-9133-8703-0, 0-9133-8703-7; OCLC 1040519884 (all editions).
- Husher, Richard William (1921–2019); Welch, Walter William, Jr. (1907–1992) (1980). A Study of Simon Willard's Clocks. Nahant, Massachusetts: Husher and Welch. LCCN 80-65021; ISBN 0-9603-9440-0, 978-0-9603-9440-1; OCLC 6703552 (all editions).
- Willard, John Ware (1859–1914) (1911). A History of Simon Willard, Inventor and Clockmaker — Together With Some Account of His Sons – His Apprentices – and the Workmen Associated With Him, With Brief Notices of Other Clockmakers of the Family Name (edition limited to 500 copies). Boston: Ernest Oswald Cockayne (1857–1940) (printer) – via Internet Archive → The author is a great-grandson of Simon Willard (1753–1848). LCCN 11-8831; OCLC 2751629 (all editions).
- Willard, John Ware (1859–1914) (1968). Simon Willard and His Clocks. New York: Dover Publications. ISBN 9780486219431 – via Internet Archive → The author is a great-grandson of Simon Willard (1753–1848). LCCN 68-23802; ISBN 0-4862-1943-7, 978-0-4862-1943-1; OCLC 906035744 (all editions).

=== Other references ===
- "American Clock Stamp". Willard House and Clock Museum. n.d. Archived from the original on May 24, 2006 – via Wayback Machine.
- Willard, Harvey Bradford, PhD (1925–2008) (2001). A Search for My Ancestry. Bradenton, Florida – via FamilySearch. OCLC 865855348, 47017200, 1048494816.
- Jay-Bee (May 24, 1936). "Grandfather Clocks". Richmond Times-Dispatch (Section 5: Sunday Magazine). Vol. 86, no. 146. p. 6 – via Newspapers.com. LCCN sn83-45389; OCLC 3741172, 226970780, 671359674.
1. "Archived link". Archived from the original on January 22, 2007 – via Wayback Machine.
- Willard, Harvey Bradford, PhD (1925–2008) (Spring 1997). "Willard Clocks" (PDF). The Texas Jack Scout (official website). 12 (2). Fork Union, Virginia: The Texas Jack Association, Inc.: 10–14. Archived from the original (PDF) on April 8, 2005 – via Wayback Machine → The author was a 6th great-grandson (9th generation descendant) of Simon Willard (1605–1675), the Massachusetts colonist. OCLC 17799876 (all editions) (publication).
- Wood, David F. (born 1950) (May 2000). "Concord, Massachusetts, Clockmakers, 1789–1817". The Magazine Antiques. 157 (5). Brant Publications: 760–769. Archived from the original on January 14, 2005 – via Wayback Machine. OCLC 0161-9284 (publication); OCLC 423919491 (all editions) (publication); OCLC 44045938, 46907138, 808060479 (article); ProQuest 211157353 & ProQuest 01619284 (Research Library database).
- "Willard, Simon (1753–1848)". Biography – Encyclopedia of Antiques. n.d. Archived from the original on October 26, 2003 – via Wayback Machine (originally posted on the website of Old And Sold Antiques Auction & Marketplace, founded around 2000 in Jacksonville, Florida, now nonexistent).
- Zea, Philip M. (born 1953) (1986). "Timekeeping: The Lifestyle of Accuracy – An Interpretive Essay for the J. Cheney Wells Collection of New England Clocks at Old Sturbridge Village" (Old Sturbridge Village research paper). Old Sturbridge Village (publisher).
