= Levi Hutchins =

American clockmaker (1761–1855)

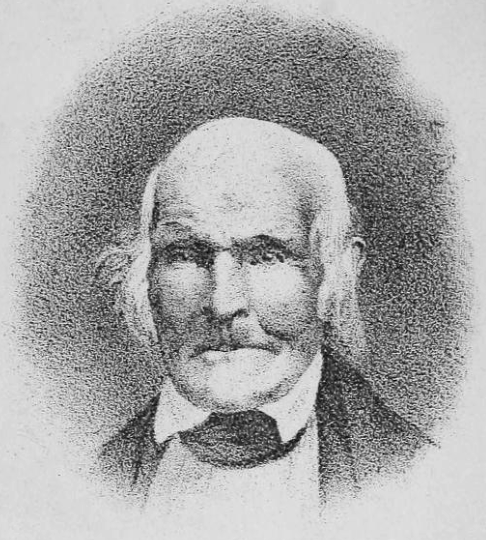
- Born: August 17, 1761; Harvard, Massachusetts, US
- Died: June 13, 1855 (aged 93); Concord, New Hampshire, US
- Occupation: Clockmaker
- Known for: Inventing the first American alarm clock
- Spouse: Phoebe Hanaford (m. 1789)

Levi Hutchins (August 17, 1761 – June 13, 1855) was an American clockmaker, and self-proclaimed inventor of the first American alarm clock.

== Biography ==
Hutchins was born in Harvard, Massachusetts, to Gordon and Holly Hutchins on August 17, 1761. In April 1775, during the American Revolutionary War, he served as a fifer under his father's command and witnessed the burning of Charlestown, Massachusetts. In September 1775, he enlisted in Captain Lewis' Company, in Colonel Varnum's Regiment, under General Greene. He marched to New York in the spring of 1776, where he was posted in Brooklyn.

He was later posted to Red Hook, where he remained until the end of his enlisted year in September 1777, after which he returned to his family in Concord, New Hampshire. He attended Byfield Academy for one year and Phillips Academy, Andover, for two quarters. He was then recruited as a school teacher and taught in the towns of Tewksbury, Pembroke, and Ashburnham, Massachusetts. On December 6, 1777, Hutchins and his brother Abel became apprentices of Simon Willard. After three years of indenture, they traveled to Abington, Connecticut, to serve a further eight-month apprenticeship in the watch repairs. Shortly after, the two brothers returned to Concord, New Hampshire, to set up shop on Main Street. In 1787 Hutchins created the first American alarm clock. It was housed in a 29-by-14-inch (74 cm × 36 cm) wooden cabinet with mirrored doors, and had an extra gear that rang an attached bell at 4 a.m.

On February 23, 1789, Levi married Phoebe Hanaford, with whom he had ten children. In the early 19th century, they were founding members of the local meeting of the Society of Friends (Quakers) in Concord. In 1793 the brothers purchased a farm together, where they farmed and continued to manufacture clocks. In 1807, as they dissolved their partnership, Hutchins received the farm. In 1808 he purchased a house on 70 acres (28 ha) on Long Pond in West Parish or West Concord Village. In about 1815, Levi built a large building and set up five looms to manufacture cloth; this business lasted three years before it was sold off. Hutchins continued to build brass clocks, as well as surveying compasses and other precision instruments, for an additional 20 years.

He died in Concord on June 13, 1855.

== Works ==
- The Autobiography of Levi Hutchins, with a Preface, Notes, and Addenda, by His Youngest Son, Riverside Press, Cambridge, 1865.
