= Roger W. Robinson =

American cardiologist (1909–2010)

- Born: July 22, 1909; Buffalo, NY
- Died: November 11, 2010 (aged 101); Grafton, Massachusetts
- Education: Northwestern University Medical School
- Known for: Lipid research, Hormone replacement therapy
- Scientific career
- Fields: Cardiology
- Workplaces: Memorial Hospital (Worcester)

Roger W. Robinson (July 22, 1909 – November 11, 2010) was an American cardiologist who served as chief of cardiology and chief of medicine at Memorial Hospital, Worcester, MA. He was the director of the Lipid Research Laboratory and served as a professor at the University of Massachusetts Medical School. He is considered a pioneer in the field of lipid and atherosclerosis research.

== Early life and career ==
Robinson was born in Buffalo, NY on July 22, 1909, to William W. and Anna (Hoover) Robinson. He graduated Northwestern University Medical School (Chicago) in 1935 and completed his post graduate training in medicine at Peter Bent Brigham Hospital (now Brigham and Women’s hospital) in Boston, MA. He joined Memorial Hospital in Worcester, MA in 1939 and served there in various roles over the ensuing 50 years. He served as an Army physician during World War II, as chief of cardiology and subsequently as chief of medicine at UMass Memorial Medical Center. His own private fundraising campaign led to the creation of the Lipid Research Laboratory at Memorial, which he also directed until his retirement in 1989. He was a professor at the University of Massachusetts Medical School, which he helped bring to Worcester.

== Career in medicine ==
Robinson engaged in research. Over the years, research funding from private and government funds, led to the development of a large research team with access to advanced lipid research equipment. Robinson recognized the role of cholesterol and diet in atherosclerotic heart disease and demonstrated that heparin prevents arterial clots. His research led to the identification of lipid-lowering effects of the female hormone estrogen and he performed the earliest studies of estrogen supplementation in men and post-menopausal women. Robinson also conducted research on strokes; his 20-year follow-up study of 1000 stroke patients is still the largest published research on the natural history of strokes.

== Willard House and Clock Museum ==
Robinson, along with his wife Imogene, cofounded the Willard House and Clock Museum in Grafton, which he served as president and chairman of the trustees.

== Death and legacy ==
Robinson died at home on November 11, 2010. The Roger W. Robinson Fund was created in his memory to support work in cardiovascular research, endocrinology, hematology and headache research and has helped purchase important laboratory equipment. An annual lecture series on Cardiovascular Disease continues.

	Year	Lecturer	Topic
1	1989	Jay N Cohn, MD	New Concepts of the Pathophysiology, Treatment and Prognosis of Heart Failure
2	1990	Stephen E Epstein, MD	Angina with Normal Coronary Arteries: A Generalized Disorder of Smooth Muscle
3	1991	Eric J Topol, MD	Thrombolytic Therapy for Acute Myocardial Infarction
4	1992	Valentin Fuster, MD	Progression and Regression of Coronary Atherogenesis: Evolving Concepts
5	1993	Robert A O'Rourke, MD	Management of the Post MI Patient: When is Coronary Arteriography Really Indicated?
6	1994	Thomas W Smith, MD	Management of the Patient with Heart Failure: New Insights and Clinical Implications
7	1995	B Greg Brown, MD PhD	The Effects of Lipid Lowering Therapy on Coronary Atherosclerosis and Clinical Events
8	1996	Robert L Frye, MD	A Perspective of Coronary Revascularization
9	1997	Shahbudin H Rahimtoola, MB FRCP MACP	Hibernating Myocardium
10	1998	J Warren Harthorne, MD	Electrotherapy: Past, Present, and Future
11	1999	Roger M Mills, MD	Heart Failure and Transplantation Perspectives at the End of the Decade
12	2000	Anthony N DeMaria, MD	Three Dimension Echocardiography: Promises and Challenges
13	2001	Victor Dzau, MD	Gene and Cell-based Therapies for Cardiovascular Disease
14	2002	James J Ferguson III, MD	The Evolving Standard of Care for Acute Coronary Syndromes
15	2003	James E Muller, MD	Diagnosis and Treatment of Vulnerable Plaque
16	2004	Alfred F Parisi, MD	From Infection to Inflammation: Fifty Years of Cardiology
17	2005	Robert Vogel, MD	The Vascular Biology of Coronary Risk Factors
18	2006	Marc A Pfeffer, MD PhD	Cardiovascular Events in Cancer Trials and Cancer Events in Cardiovascular Trials
19	2007	Peter C Block, MD	Percutaneous Repair and Replacement for Valvular Heart Disease
20	2008	George Beller, MD	Diagnostic and Prognostic Applications of Multimodality Imaging in Coronary Artery Disease
21	2009	William Gaasch, MD	Left Ventricular Diastolic Dysfunction and Heart Failure
22	2010	Peter R Kowey, MD	New Therapies in Atrial Fibrillation
23	2011	Joseph Alpert, MD	Changing Demographics in the US and the World and Its Effects on Clinical Medicine
24	2012-13	Robert A Phillips, MD PhD	Hypertension and Hypertrophy: Impacting and Predicting Renal and CV Outcomes in Chronic Kidney Disease
25	2014-15	Nikolaos Kakouros, MRCP PhD	Interventional Options for the Elderly with Cardiovascular disease
