= Lighthouse clock =

Type of mantel clock

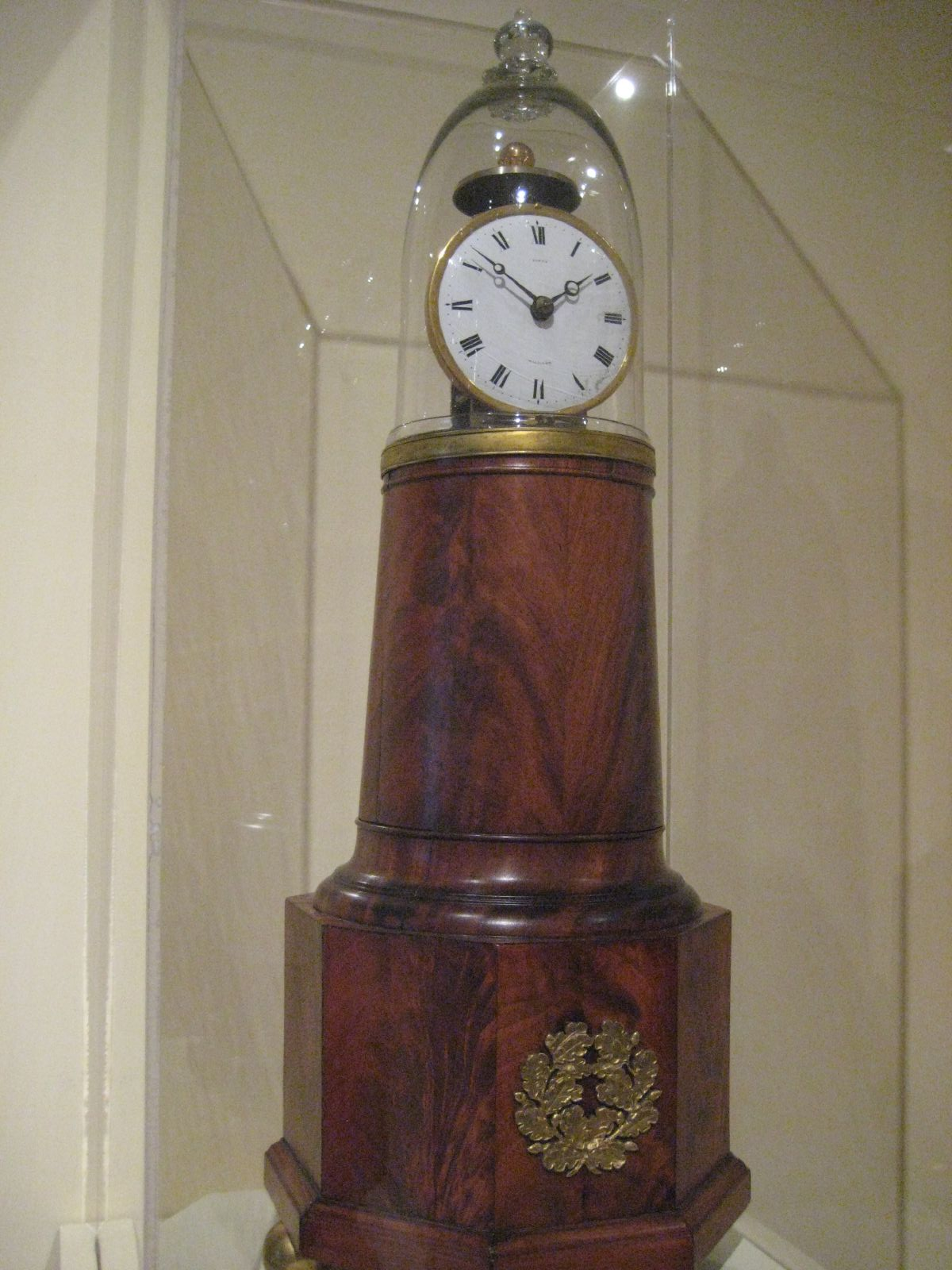
A c. 1825–30 lighthouse timepiece by Simon Willard

A lighthouse clock is a type of mantel clock manufactured in the U.S. from 1818 through 1830s by the American clockmaker Simon Willard, having the dial and works exposed beneath a glass dome on a tapered, cylindrical body.

They were also made by Simon Willard & Son, a partnership between the clockmaker and his son Simon Willard Jr. created in 1823. The father and son were in partnership for five years and in 1828, Simon Willard, Jr. established his own shop in Boston.

== History ==
Lighthouse clocks are regarded as the first alarm clocks produced in America, although a significant number of the later clocks of this type were crafted without alarms. The clock consist of a round, square or octagonal wooden base that rises in a tapered column, which is itself surmounted by clockworks that are covered by a glass dome, giving the effect of a standing lighthouse. Some bases were decorated with pictures depicting classical scenes.

Both the form and the respective patented movement (in 1818) were invented by the clockmaker and this timekeeper was devised to offer an alarm mechanism in a high-style shelf clock. Originally known as the "Patent Alarm Timepiece", S. Willard's patent also refers to them as "alarum (sic) clocks", they have become known as lighthouse clocks (a 20th century term) for their obvious similarities. The design of the cases were based on the classical art then in vogue; Neoclassicism and Empire. Some of these clocks, however, are less formal and reflect the vernacular interest in painted furniture, particularly Windsor chairs. Therefore, the wood cases are quite varied in design, quality and workmanship, and they could be paint and stencil decorated or mahogany with decorative ormolu brass mounts. The best pieces, displayed figured mahogany veneer as the finest Empire parlour furnitures. Few original Willard lighthouse clocks have survived and it is estimated that about 200 to 300 examples of this highly sought-after collector timepiece remain.

The timekeepers are generally 24 to 30 inches tall, although there are examplaries where the column is as short as a couple inches. The notion of a clock under a dome may hark back to the imported, some glass-domed, French Empire mantel clocks fashionable at the time. Or, they might have been influenced by English and French skeletonized clocks as well; that is, clocks whose plates have been cut and exposed in such a way as to show the internal workings of the clock. Willard's clockworks were not skeletonized, but the mechanism was visible too. The alarm bell was mounted atop the clock brass movement. Clock mechanisms are driven by a weight concealed in the body of the lighthouse, though the alarm mechanism is sometimes driven by a separate weight raised by a pullcord.

A unique lighthouse clock in mahogany case, currently displayed in the White House library.

Regarding the movement, it is an 8-day weight driven, pendulum regulated clock and, as well as the cases, there were a considerable variety of mechanisms in terms of workmanship and design. Clocks with similar cases have significant differences in their movements, this could indicate there were many different makers or that some works were being imported from Europe. About the dial, period lighthouse clocks either had porcelain dials with brass backs or painted iron dials, bearing the inscription; "Simon Willard" or "Willard Patent" or "Simon Willard's Patten" or "Simon Willard and Son's Pattent"; others have signed cases or tags with similar wording. In the larger market, however, there are a significant number of lighthouse clocks without a name on the dial, and even a few clocks with the names of other makers.

Most lighthouse clocks were produced between the mid-1820s and the mid-1830s, which was a time when the Empire style was still the prevailing art movement, hence that many lighthouse clocks have Empire cases.

The reason why lighthouse clocks never became a mass-produced timepiece is because in the 1830s the US was deeply into the Industrial Revolution and mass production. The manufacturers who were able to produce cheap clocks and then sell them for $2 were forcing individual clockmakers out of business. Lighthouse clocks were custom and handmade objects created in an age when the vast majority of the clocks were commercially manufactured. These original clocks were going against the Industrial Revolution. They were continuing the tradition of the handmade clock and the workshop of an individual craftsman.

During the 20th century reproductions of this kind of mantel clock have been made, and a couple of clockmakers still manufacture them, reflecting the continued interest among collectors in the clocks made by Simon Willard.

An unusual example is displayed in one of the bookshelves in the White House library. The clock was made by the clockmaker to commemorate the visit of the Marquis de Lafayette to the United States in 1824-1825. A likeness of Lafayette appears in a medallion on its base.

Original lighthouse clocks are rare and have become very valuable; for instance one was sold at Sotheby's auction house on January 6, 2006 for US$744,000.
