= Aaron Willard =

Massachusetts clockmaker (1757–1844)

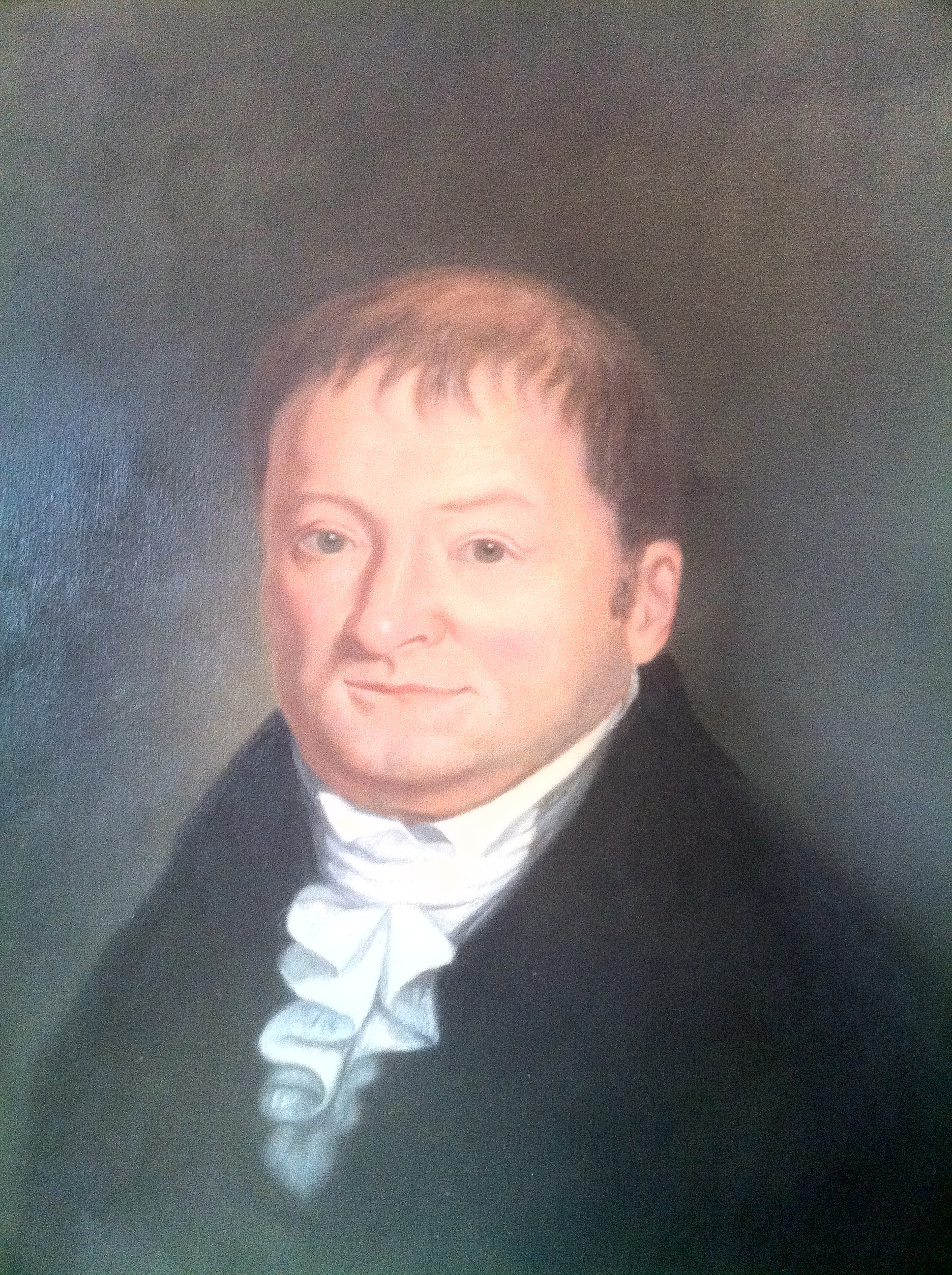
- Portrait by John Ritto Penniman
- Born: October 14, 1757; Grafton, Province of Massachusetts Bay, British Empire
- Died: May 20, 1844 (aged 86); Boston, Massachusetts, U.S.
- Occupations: entrepreneur, industrialist, clock designer

Aaron Willard (October 14, 1757 – May 20, 1844) was an entrepreneur, industrialist, and clockmaker who worked at his Roxbury, Massachusetts, factory during the early years of the United States of America.

While at the family farm at Grafton, Aaron Willard developed his career conjointly with his three brothers, who also became horologists (though Aaron's and his brother Simon's creations are the most significant).

He and Simon later moved to Roxbury, Boston, Massachusetts, where they developed factories independently from each other. Simon and Aaron Willard's clocks were the first economically accessible timepieces of the country.

== Willard family ==
The first American ancestor of Willard's family was Simon Willard who arrived in 1634, together with his wife Mary Sharpe, from Horsmonden, Kent, England. In America, Simon Willard became a military commander and fought against the Indians. The Willards were among the founders of the town of Concord, Massachusetts. Later on, Simon held a prominent role as politician and judge.

A century later, Aaron Willard was of Simon's fifth New England generation. He was born in 1757, at a farm located in the hill-region of Grafton, in Worcester County, Massachusetts. Aaron Willard's parents were Benjamin Willard and Sarah Brooks. He was the third of four sons; his brothers were Benjamin, Simon, and Ephraim.

=== Willard Brothers ===
After Senior Benjamin's first steps into horology, the four brothers became horologists as well. All developed their skills at their Grafton farm and, initially, they shared time between farming chores and the new activity.

== A pioneer of an American industry ==
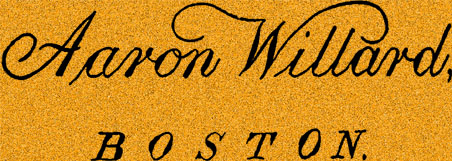
Clock's signature

At Boston, the two Willard brothers' chief enterprises were of the first American industries. Their well-organized modern workshops demanded supplies—such as mahogany or previously cast pieces—which stemmed from more than 20 manufacturers within a mile-zone. They dominated the clock-making in the Boston region.

Both brothers had successful policies in commerce, although they were permanently pledged into improving the design of their clocks too. Due to Aaron's massive production, the clock became a domesticated product for public usage, whether in parlors, offices, or the like. Nonetheless, the Willard brothers' clocks weren't affordable yet for most common people.

The Willard family became quite recognizable within American high society, particularly Simon.

== Clock-models ==
Although the clocks had been relatively expensive, both Willard brothers strove to compact the traditional 18th century British type of longcase clock. They simplified its action-mechanism and, for casing, they used specifically tailored wooden frames—which were uncomplicated for either manufacturing or assembling.

Their new smaller models were relatively economic. Therefore, sales rose quickly, and the Willard brothers supplied clocks to both public and domestic consumers.

Aaron Willard's models were:

- Tall clock (Grandfather-Clock)
- Massachusetts Shelf clock
- Willard Patent Timepiece (Banjo-Clock)
- Gallery Clock
- Regulator clock
- 30-hour wall clock (Grafton timepiece)

On every unit, Aaron Willard spelled his signature out, over either the dial or the glass-panel.

Aaron Willard's Shelf Clock

Aaron Willard's Lyre Clock

=== Tall Clock (Grandfather-Clock) ===
Aaron Willard began manufacturing and commercializing traditional tall case clocks (referred to as longcase clocks outside of the US). These clocks, often called Grandfather clocks today, generally stood about 7 1/2 to 8 feet tall. Although some other clockmakers produced wooden movement clocks, Willard made only clocks with brass movements. His tall case clocks were typically of eight-day duration.

==== The case ====
Like Simon's, Aaron's clocks adopted a distinguishing feature early: since 1790, about their cases where, up over the dial, the case-door delineated a half circle which echoed the dial.

The clocks' tops were adorned with a series of wooden curly arrangements called Whales-Tails. Later on, these ringlets evolved, and they finished extra-stretched and artistically riddled too.

Many elements of brass—which were usually imported—sprinkled all cases' woodwork. Particularly, Aaron's clocks had three spherical finials on top. However, the case presented a spate of other small brassy touches around, depending on the model.

The case's door was secured by means of an iron lock.

==== Faces ====
The clock dials (faces) were painted iron. They were produced with varying complexity, in accord with the price of the model. For the economical, it was relatively unadorned. For the most expensive types, the dial featured artistic paintings from recognized Bostonian artists.

Aaron Willard increased the value of his clocks by adding features to the dials. Most had a revolving calendar wheel, indicating the date. Many incorporated a revolving moon disc at the top of the dial for indicating the phases of the moon. In rare instances, a "rocking ship" dial was used. These were produced in Boston and are highly desirable to collectors. They are fitted with a small depiction of a sailing ship that rocks back and forth in the arch of the dial. it is driven by the motion of the pendulum.

==== Decadence ====
About 1812, the Napoleonic Wars altered the national economy, forcing a simplification of the most expensive models, due to cost-problems. For example, the dial-door became a conventional square, and the extra devices, which were traditionally around the dial, were simplified.

=== Massachusetts Shelf clock ===
Arriving in Roxbury, MA. about 1780, and continued to produce tall case clocks, but some time later began to produce Shelf Clocks. This model was much smaller than the tall case clocks and as a result, was suitable for being placed on a mantle, shelf or a piece of furniture. Nowadays, the Shelf-Clocks are often sought by collectors.

=== Banjo clock (Willard Patent Timepiece) ===
Aaron Willard's third clock-model was the Banjo clock, which eventually became the factory's mainstream.

The Banjo had been invented by Simon in 1802. It comprised a compacted mechanism in a compact body which could be fastened on a wall. With a not-cheap price of about $30, it was nevertheless a hit. It became the most famous clock in the early history of the United States.

== Daily work ==
=== Grafton ===
At Grafton, in Worcester County, Massachusetts, the one-room farm had been built in 1718 by Joseph Willard, who belonged to the third generation of the Willard family. The residence was further enlarged through the years.

In 1776, Benjamin Willard began learning the horologist profession there, and he built a small workshop for commerce. Consequently, his knowledge was learnt also by his brothers. All did a seasonal tradeoff between farming chores and their new profession. By producing clocks for the region, the business eventually was profitable.

=== Roxbury (1792) ===
Successively, three of Willard brothers moved to Boston's Roxbury Street. Benjamin arrived in 1770. Simon arrived approximately in 1778, to the 2196-address.

Aaron Willard brought his business in 1792 to the 2224-address which was a quarter of a mile from Simon's. The Boston Directory promoted Aaron's establishment as "Aaron Willard, clock maker on the Neck." The factory's workshop functioned inside an extension which was bigger than the actual residence. Inside, the number of employees was approximately 30 during the best years. Within a radius of a quarter of a mile, 21 other important manufacturers supplied the factory in different capacities.

== Marriages ==
=== Catherine Gates ===
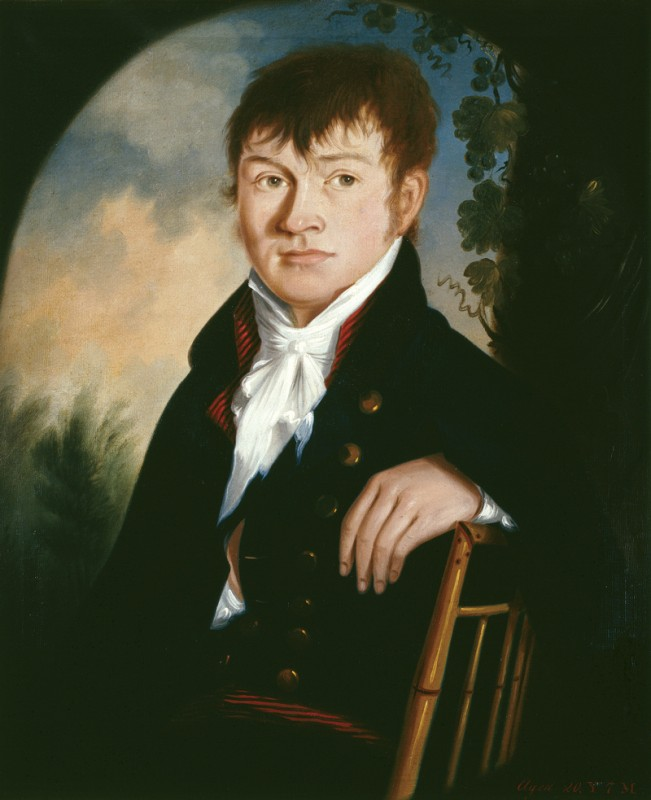
Aaron Willard Jr.

After his two brothers had already settled in Boston, Aaron Willard met a lady who was from nearby. Catherine Gates was from the Roxbury region, which neighbored Boston to the south, in Suffolk County. They married on March 6, 1783, in Roxbury. She was 20 years old.

They had two children: Aaron Willard, Junior, on June 29, 1783, and Nancy Willard, on July 14, 1785. Catherine Gates died just days after the second birth. In time, Aaron Junior would be a renowned horologist too.

=== Mary Partridge ===
In the same decade, Aaron Willard married again, to Mary Partridge, who lived on nearby Roxbury St. She was 27 years old. The wedding took place at the Grafton farm on November 19, 1789.

They had nine children:

- Mary, in 1790
- Sophia and Emily, in 1792, who were twins
- Catherine Gates, in 1794
- George, in 1796
- Jane J., in 1798
- Charles, in 1800
- Henry, in 1802
- Morris, in 1808

== Death ==
In 1823, Aaron Willard went into retirement. He died on May 20, 1844, at Roxbury, Suffolk, Massachusetts. He was 87 years old.

== Current exhibitions ==
=== Willard House and Clock Museum ===
Today, the Grafton homestead—which housed the original Willard brothers' workshop—is house museum Willard House and Clock Museum. It exhibits over 80 Willard clocks and numerous Willard family heirlooms.

=== Old Sturbridge Village ===
The J. Cheney Wells Clock Gallery is located at Old Sturbridge Village, Sturbridge, Massachusetts.

The general collection of 122 clocks has a scope which ranges from 1725 to 1825. Some of the pieces are valuated at over 100,000 dollars. Twelve of the clocks are Aaron Willard's.

== Bibliography ==
- Clock Making in New England 1725-1825: An Interpretation of the Old Sturbridge Village Collection. By Philip Zea and Robert C. Cheney. Village, 1992.
