= District of Columbia Department of Consumer and Regulatory Affairs =

The District of Columbia Department of Consumer and Regulatory Affairs (DCRA) is a former District of Columbia agency that issued licenses and permits. On October 1, 2022, DCRA was split into two agencies— the Department of Licensing and Consumer Protection (DLCP) and the Department of Buildings (DOB).

== Mission ==
According to the DCRA: The mission of the Department of Consumer and Regulatory Affairs is to protect the health, safety, economic interests, and quality of life of residents, businesses, and visitors in the District of Columbia by issuing licenses and permits, conducting inspections, enforcing building, housing, and safety codes, regulating land use and development, and providing consumer education and advocacy services.

DCRA is the District of Columbia's regulatory agency. DCRA licenses professionals and businesses; inspects and regulates building, housing, and land. DCRA regulates business activities, land and building use, construction safety, oversees historic preservation enforcement, rental housing and real estate, and occupational and professional conduct with the District. The department takes legal action against businesses and individuals who violate District laws, and works to prevent the occurrence of illegal, deceptive, and unfair trade practices through education and public awareness programs.

DCRA protects the health, safety, economic interests and quality of life of residents, business, and visitors in the District of Columbia by issuing licenses and permits, conducting inspections, enforcing building, housing, and safety codes, regulating land use and development, and providing consumer education and advocacy services. DCRA consist of six (6) Agency Divisions listed below:

Business and Professional Licensing Administration (BPLA)

BPLA consist of eight (8) divisions: Business Licensing, Corporations, Consumer Protection, Professional Licensing, Regulatory Investigations, Small Business Resource Center, Vending & Special Events, and Weights & Measures. BPLA is responsible for issuing and enforcing licensing and regulatory implications across these categories.

Inspection & Compliance

Inspection and Compliance Division conducts Construction Inspections, Housing Code & Property Management Inspections, Illegal Construction Investigations and also certifies Third Party Agencies to conduct construction inspections on our behalf.

Permit Operations Division

The Permits Operations Division is responsible for reviewing applications for and issuing Building Permits, Supplemental (Trades) Permits, Certificates of Occupancy, and Home Occupation Permits.

Regulatory Enforcement Administration

The Enforcement Administration's mission is to identify and account for unoccupied property, and conduct inspections of residential housing complaints that violate DC Housing code regulation.

Surveyors

The Office of the Surveyor maintains the legal records of all land plats and subdivisions of private and District government property within the District of Columbia. The existing records cover a period of more than two centuries.

Zoning Administration

The Zoning Administrator reviews applications for conformance with DC Zoning Regulations, under Title 11 DCMR.

== History ==
In April 2007, Mayor Adrian Fenty appointed Linda Argo as Director of DCRA.

In the summer of 2007, one housing inspector was sentenced to 60 months in prison and DCRA was the subject of an FBI investigation following a scheme to require a developer to pay for permits. To lift a stop-work order, developers were requested to pay $20,000. Later in 2007, another DCRA employee was found guilty of bribery after telling a hotel engineer that she could obtain permits in exchange for cash.

Under Argo's leadership, efforts were undertaken in 2010 to modernize the agency. DCRA moved to new headquarters at 1100 Fourth St. SW, which included an open permitting and licensing center. Argo left in 2010, following Adrian Fenty's defeat.

In 2015, a permit expediter was charged with paying bribes to DCRA permitting officials. The bribes were termed "lunch money" and ranged from $20 to $500.

In October 2022, the agency was split into two new agencies— DLCP and DOB.

== Leadership ==
At the time of its cessation of operations in October 2022, Ernest Chrappah was the agency's director having been installed in November 2018. Under his leadership, DCRA was able to complete a digital overhaul of the agency, transforming it from a largely in-person service provider into an agency where residents could obtain its services online. In doing so, the agency increased its service delivery and transparency. Melinda Bolling was the agency's previous permanent director. Previously, she served as interim director and general counsel. Prior to Ms. Bolling, Rabbiah Sabbakhan was the acting director. Prior to Rabbiah Sabbakhan, the former director of the DCRA was Nicholas A. Majett, a Washington lawyer and civil servant; in 2006 he became the deputy director of the department and was subsequently appointed director on 18 December 2010.

== Purview ==
The DCRA issues or maintains the following:

- Building permits
- Zoning regulations/certificates of occupancy
- Construction codes
- Corporate registration
- Business licensing
- Professional licensing
- Construction inspections
- Housing Code inspections
- Vacant property regulation

== See also ==
- List of company registers
