= Benjamin Willard =

Massachusetts clockmaker

Benjamin Willard, Jr. (19 March 1743 Grafton, Massachusetts – 18 September 1803 Baltimore, Maryland), was an American clockmaker.

== Biography ==
Benjamin Willard the third eldest of twelve born to the marriage of Benjamin Willard (1716–1775) and Sarah Brooks (1717–1775). He was the first of the Willard family to enter the business of clockmaking, a craft which he began around 1765. He operated a workshop at his family home in Grafton, but by December 1771, lived in Roxbury, Massachusetts.

Benjamin Willard, Jr., died in Baltimore, Maryland, September 18, 1803.

== Legacy ==
Although not as famous as his younger brother, Simon, Benjamin nonetheless was a prominent and well-known clockmaker in his day. A number of Benjamin Willard clocks survive today and are considered collectible. The Willard home and workshop in Grafton are preserved and operate as a museum.

== Family ==
Benjamin Willard, Jr. – the eldest of four clockmaker brothers – flourished in central Massachusetts during the late 18th and early 19th centuries.

The other clockmaker brothers were:

- Simon (1753–1823)
- Ephraim Willard (1755–1832)
- Aaron(1757–1844)

Benjamin Willard was a 2nd great-grandson (5th generation descendant) of Simon Willard (1605–1676), a Massachusetts colonist.

== Bibliography ==
=== References linked to notes ===
- Dyer, Walter Alden (1878–1943) (June 1915). "The Willards and Their Clocks". Country Life in America. 28 (2). Garden City, New York: Doubleday, Page & Company: 44–47 – via Google Books. ISSN 0011-0175; OCLC 1042918985 (all editions).
- Dyer, Walter Alden (1878–1943) (October 1915). "The Willards and Their Clocks". Early American Craftsmen. New York: The Century Company. pp. 133–161 – via Google Books. LCCN 15-22279; OCLC 422878 (all editions) (book); OCLC 852406757 (Chapter 6).
- Pope, Charles Henry (1841–1918) (compiler and editor) (1915). Willard Genealogy – Sequel to Willard Memoir. Boston: The Willard Family Association. p. 280 – via Google Books. Materials gathered chiefly by Joseph Willard (1798–1865) and Charles Wilkes Walker (1849–1927). LCCN 15-27575; OCLC 36164693 (all editions).
1. "Benjamin Willard". pp. 69–70.
2. "Benjamin Willard". pp. 137–138.
3. "Simon Willard". pp. 139–140.
4. "Ephraim Willard". p. 140.
5. "Aaron Willard". pp. 140–141.
