= Walter Alden Dyer =

American author and journalist (1878-1943)

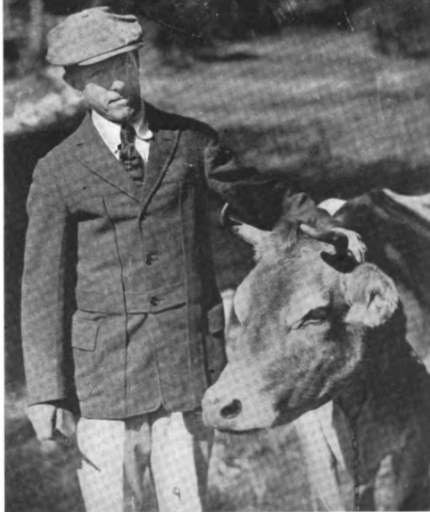
- Born: October 10, 1878; Roslindale, Massachusetts
- Died: June 20, 1943 (aged 64); Pelham, Massachusetts
- Occupations: Author, journalist
- Spouse: Ethelind Thorp Childs (m. 1903)

Walter Alden Dyer (October 10, 1878 – June 20, 1943) was an American author and journalist.

== Biography ==
Dyers was born in Roslindale, Massachusetts to Ebenezer Porter Dyer, Jr. and Martha Augusta Fearing. He graduated from Amherst College Class of 1900. He joined the staff of the Springfield Union in Springfield, Massachusetts in 1901, edited many publications, and was the managing editor of Country Life in America from 1905 to 1914. He was editor of The Amherst Graduates' Quarterly from 1932 to 1943 and became the director of Amherst College Press in 1933. He was one of the most famous writers of dog stories. He was a prolific writer who contributed many articles to magazines, and published various works.

In 1903 Dyer married Ethelind Thorp Childs, who died in 1904. In 1907 he married her sister Muriel Worthington Childs. He died in Pelham, Massachusetts on June 20, 1943. The Archives and Special Collections at Amherst College holds his papers.

Frontispiece Pierrot, Chien de Belgique (translation by Fanny Mathot - 1916

== Selected publications ==
- The Lure of the Antique (1910)
- The Richer Life (1911)
- Pierrot, Dog of Belgium (1915), French title: Pierro, chien de Belgique
- Creators of Decorative Styles (1917)
- Handbook of Furniture Styles (1918)
- Sons of Liberty (1920)
- Gulliver the Great(1916)
- The River Life (1911)
- Dogs of Boytown (1918)
- Many Dogs There Be (1924)
- All Around Robin Hood's Barn: a Canine Idyll (1926)
- The Breakwater (1927)
- Sprigs of Hemlock (1931)
