= Banjo clock =

Type of wall clock

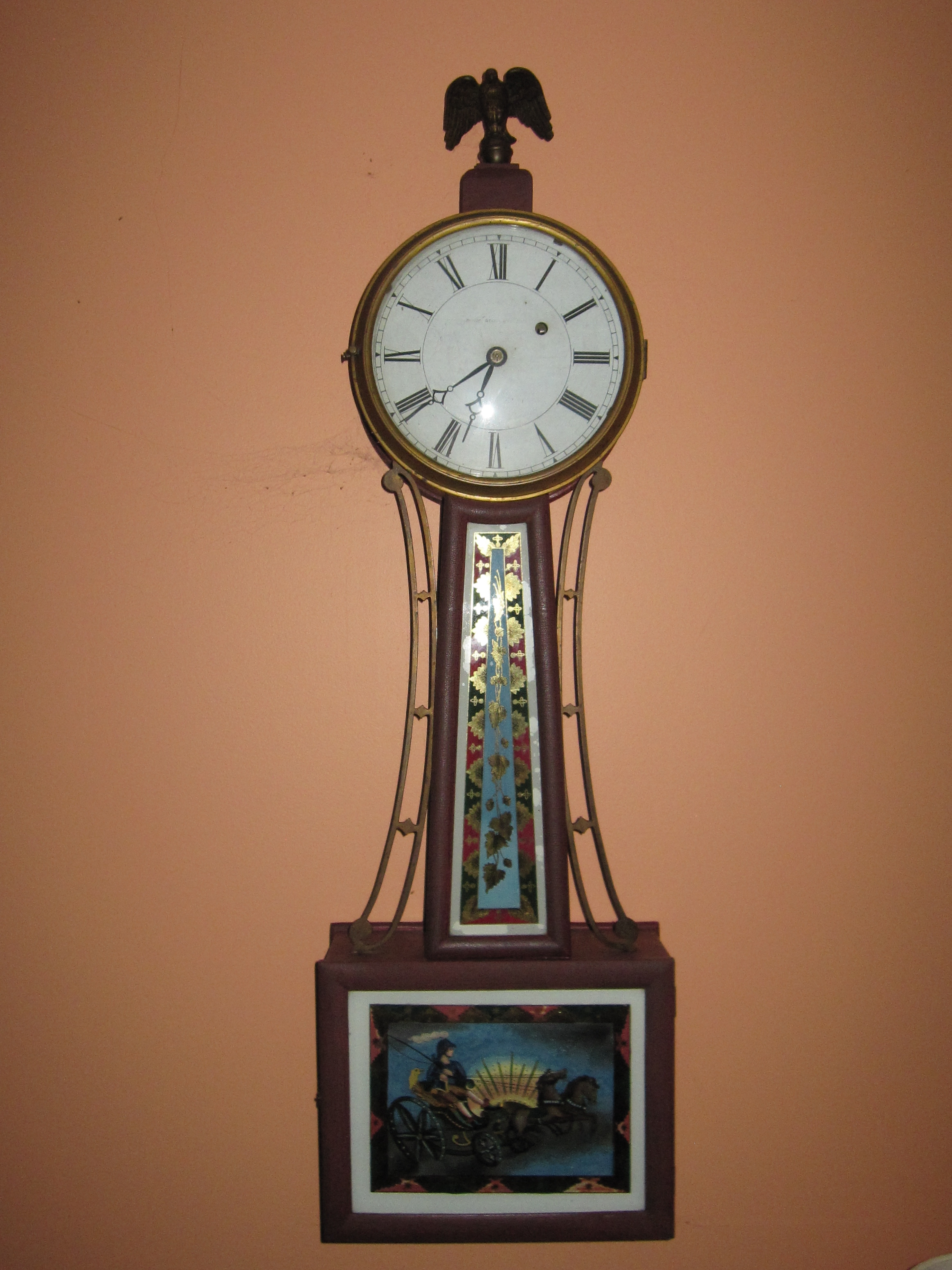
Banjo clock

The banjo clock, or banjo timepiece, is an American wall clock with a banjo-shaped case. It was invented by Simon Willard, originally of Grafton, Massachusetts, later of Roxbury, Massachusetts, and patented in 1802. The banjo clock normally lacks a striking mechanism and indicates time only by its hands and dial, so some horologists call it a timepiece rather than a true clock. In popular usage though, no such distinction is made.

== Wooden case ==
A banjo clock's wooden case usually features a round opening for a painted dial, a long-waisted throat, and a rectangular pendulum box with hinged door. Both the throat and door are typically ornamented with reverse-painted (verre églomisé) glass panels, and the case is usually flanked by curved and pierced brass frets. A finial mounted atop the case often takes the form of a cast-brass eagle or a turned, giltwood acorn.

== Production ==
Only 4,000 authentic Simon Willard banjo clocks were made. The style was widely copied by other clockmakers of the Willard family as well as other craftsmen and industrial clock manufacturers. Other banjo-style clockmakers made examples with square or diamond-shaped dials and clocks featuring the heavily gilt "girandole" style.

== See also ==
- Lighthouse clock
