= Emma Willard Memorial =

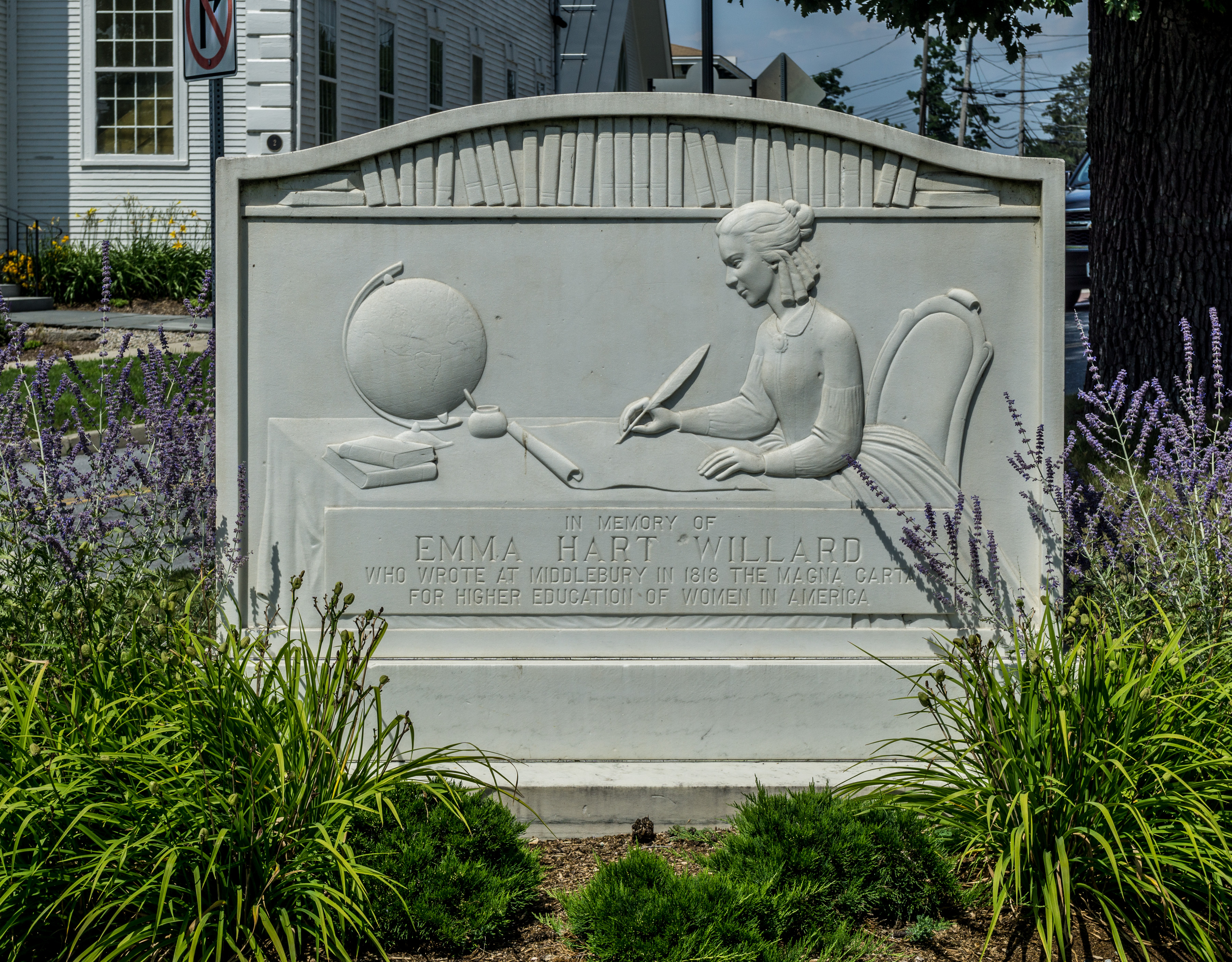
- Artist: Marion Guild, Pierre Zwick, T.A. Campbell
- Year: 1941
- Type: marble
- Dimensions: 120 cm × 20 cm × 180 cm (48 in × 8 in × 72 in)
- Location: Middlebury, Vermont; 44°0′53.73″N 73°10′1.34″W
- Owner: Daughters of the American Revolution, Ethan Allen Chapter, Middlebury, VT

The Emma Hart Willard Memorial, is a public artwork designed by Marion Guild and Pierre Zwick. It was sculpted by T.A. Campbell who worked for the Houlihan Shop in Rutland, Vermont. Erected in 1941, the memorial is located in a triangular-shaped park at the intersection of route 30 and route 7 in downtown Middlebury, Vermont.

== Description ==
The overall dimensions of this marble relief are 4 feet (1.2 m) tall, 6 feet (1.8 m) long, and 4 inches (10 cm) wide. It rests on a white marble double base. The upper base measures 8 inches (20 cm) tall, 6 feet (1.8 m) long, and 8 inches (20 cm) wide. The lower base measures 8 inches (20 cm) tall, 7 feet (2.1 m) long, and 8 inches (20 cm) wide.

The Emma Willard Memorial is a two sided slab of marble with straight sides and an arched top. One side is carved to depict educator and American women's rights advocate Emma Willard seated at a desk, and holding a pen as she writes. A globe, ink well, and books are depicted on the desk. The words "In memory of Emma Hart Willard Who Wrote at Middlebury in 1818 the Magna Carta for Higher Education of Women in America" are carved above the relief. On the opposite side of the memorial, the carved inscription reads, "Education Should Seek To Bring Its Subjects to the Perfection of their Moral, Intellectual and Physical Nature, in order that they May be of the Greatest Possible Use to Themselves and Others 1787 - Emma Hart Willard 1870".

The relief is unsigned.

== Information ==
Emma Hart Willard (February 23, 1787 – April 15, 1870) came to Middlebury, Vermont in 1807 to run the Middlebury Female Seminary. She left her position at the Seminary in 1809 when she married a local doctor and banker John Willard. Due to a financial reversal in 1814, Emma Willard began to teach women at the collegiate level in her home, and, thus, is credited as being the start of women's collegiate education in the United States. The quote on the reverse side of the monument is taken from Willard's An Address to the Public, particularly to the Members of the Legislature of New York, proposing a Plan for Improving Female Education, published in 1819.

=== Acquisition ===
The sculpture was designed and sculpted with funding from the Federal Arts Project, and erected with funding from the Works Progress Administration. Since its dedication in 1941, the Emma Willard Memorial has been maintained by the Daughters of the American Revolution and is presently administered by the Daughters of the American Revolution, Ethan Allen Chapter, Middlebury, Vermont.

== Artist ==
American artist/illustrator Marion Guild was employed by Pierre Zwick, a painter and director of arts for the state of Vermont under the Works Progress Administration, to create the memorial's design. Guild is perhaps best known for creating the pop-up illustrations for the 1939 edition of Robert L. May's Rudolph the Red-Nosed Reindeer. Zwick was initially solely credited for the design of the memorial.

== Condition ==
This sculpture was documented as well maintained in 1992 as part of Save Outdoor Sculpture!, a campaign organized by Heritage Preservation: The National Institute of Conservation partnered with the Smithsonian Institution, specifically the Smithsonian American Art Museum. Throughout the 1990s, over 7,000 volunteers cataloged and assessed the condition of over 30,000 publicly accessible statues, monuments, and sculptures installed as outdoor public art across the United States. In Vermont, the survey was sponsored by the Vermont Museum and Gallery Alliance from 1992 to 1993 where 110 volunteers surveyed 242 sculptures dating from 1740 to 1993. The archives from the project are maintained by the Vermont Historical Society.

== See also ==
- Marble sculpture
