= John Willard (judge) =

American judge

John Willard (May 20, 1792, Guilford, New Haven County, Connecticut – August 31, 1862, Saratoga Springs, Saratoga County, New York) was an American lawyer and politician from New York.

== Life ==
He graduated from Middlebury College in 1813. He studied law, was admitted to the bar in 1817, and commenced practice in Salem, Washington County, New York. In 1829, he married Elizabeth Smith (1794–1859). They were the parents of a daughter, Sarah Elizabeth (Willard) Fowler (1830–1852).

Willard was First Judge of the Washington County Court from 1826 to 1835; Surrogate of Washington County from 1832 to 1837; Judge of the Fourth Circuit Court from 1836 to 1847; a justice of the New York Supreme Court (4th D.) from 1847 to 1853; and ex officio an associate judge of the New York Court of Appeals in 1853.

At the New York state election, 1855, he ran on the Hard Democratic ticket for a seat on the Court of Appeals, but was defeated by George F. Comstock, the Know Nothing candidate.

Willard was Permanent Chairman of the Douglas Democratic state convention of 1860; and a member of the New York State Senate (15th D.) in 1862.

He died at his home in Saratoga Springs, and was buried in Greenridge Cemetery in Saratoga Springs.

Willard's uncle, also named John Willard, was the husband of Emma Willard and served as U.S. Marshal for Vermont.

== Sources ==
- The New York Civil List compiled by Franklin Benjamin Hough (pages 351, 356, 365 and 419; Weed, Parsons and Co., 1858)
- The New York Civil List compiled by Franklin Benjamin Hough, Stephen C. Hutchins and Edgar Albert Werner (1867; pg. 443)
- Memorial of John Willard LL.D. (1863)
- Court of Appeals judges at NY Court History
- POLITICAL MOVEMENTS; The Douglas Democratic State Convention in NYT on August 16, 1860

New York State Senate
Preceded by Isaiah Blood	Member of the New York State Senate from the 15th district 1862	Succeeded by William Clark
