= Jabez Fitch =

Jabez Fitch may refer to:

- Jabez G. Fitch (1764–1824), businessman and political figure from Vermont
- Jabez W. Fitch (1823–1884), American politician, Lieutenant Governor of Ohio
