= Ebenezer Fitch =

American Calvinist clergyman and educator

Ebenezer Fitch (September 26, 1756 – March 21, 1833) was an American Calvinist clergyman and educator. He was the first president of Williams College.

== Biography ==
Born in Norwich, Connecticut, Fitch graduated as valedictorian from Yale College in 1777. The American Revolutionary War was ongoing at the time, but because Fitch was a student and then resident tutor (1780–1783) at Yale, he was exempted from the military draft then in effect. He later tried his hand at business, but was largely unsuccessful, and was invited in 1790 to move to Williamstown, Massachusetts, and serve as preceptor of a new free academy for boys. Fitch took the position and made many changes to the institution, converting it into a college in 1793. As one of only two faculty members at the beginning, Fitch taught many classes himself. Highly religious, he gave the sermons on Sundays at the college and introduced the Westminster Catechism to Williams. But the college foundered, and Fitch resigned in 1815. He then served as a pastor at a Presbyterian church, and continued to preach until his death in West Bloomfield, New York.

Mount Fitch in the town of Adams, near Williamstown, was named after Fitch.

Fitch was a son of Dr. Jabez Fitch and Lydia (Huntington) Fitch. His siblings included Jabez G. Fitch, who served as U.S. Marshal for Vermont.
