= Esprit Pézenas =

- Born: 28 November 1692; Avignon, France
- Died: 4 February 1776 (aged 83); Avignon, France
- Known for: Discovery of Gegenschein
- Scientific career
- Fields: Astronomy, Hydrography, Mathematics
- Institutions: Observatoire St-Croix

Esprit Pézenas (28 November 1692 – 4 February 1776) was a French Jesuit astronomer, hydrographer, and mathematician who worked at the observatory in Marseilles. Through his writings and teaching he spread ideas on astronomy, mathematics and navigation including advances in other European countries.

Pézenas was born in Avignon where his father worked at the court. He studied at the Jesuit college and taught physics, logic, and metaphysics for a while in Lyons and then at Aix. In 1728 he became a professor of hydrography at Marseilles where he taught navy officers navigation and other aspects. He wrote on hydrography, the measurement of tonnage, differential calculus. In 1749 he became director of the Observatoire St-Croix in Marseilles. Tomás Cerdá worked at the Marseilles observatory under Padre Pézenas and studied mathematical techniques. Pézenas translated the work of the English chronographer John Harrison in 1767 for use in the accurate determination of longitudes and was involved in the computation of the longitude of Marseilles.

Pézenas claimed the role of Pierre Vernier in the invention of the Vernier scale, claiming that it was undue to give credit to Pedro Nunes or Petrus Nonius for what has been called the nonius. Pézenas is credited with the discovery of the phenomenon of Gegenschein, a faint glow in the nightsky at the point opposite to the sun in 1731 but some have suggested that it was first observed in 1854 by Theodor Johann Christian Ambders Brorsen while others have claimed that it was already known in the 6th century BC. Based on observations on sunspots, he computed the solar rotation period as 26 days and 9 hours. He retired in 1763 to Avignon where he died.
