= Emma Willard House =

Historic house in Vermont, United States

- U.S. National Register of Historic Places
- U.S. National Historic Landmark
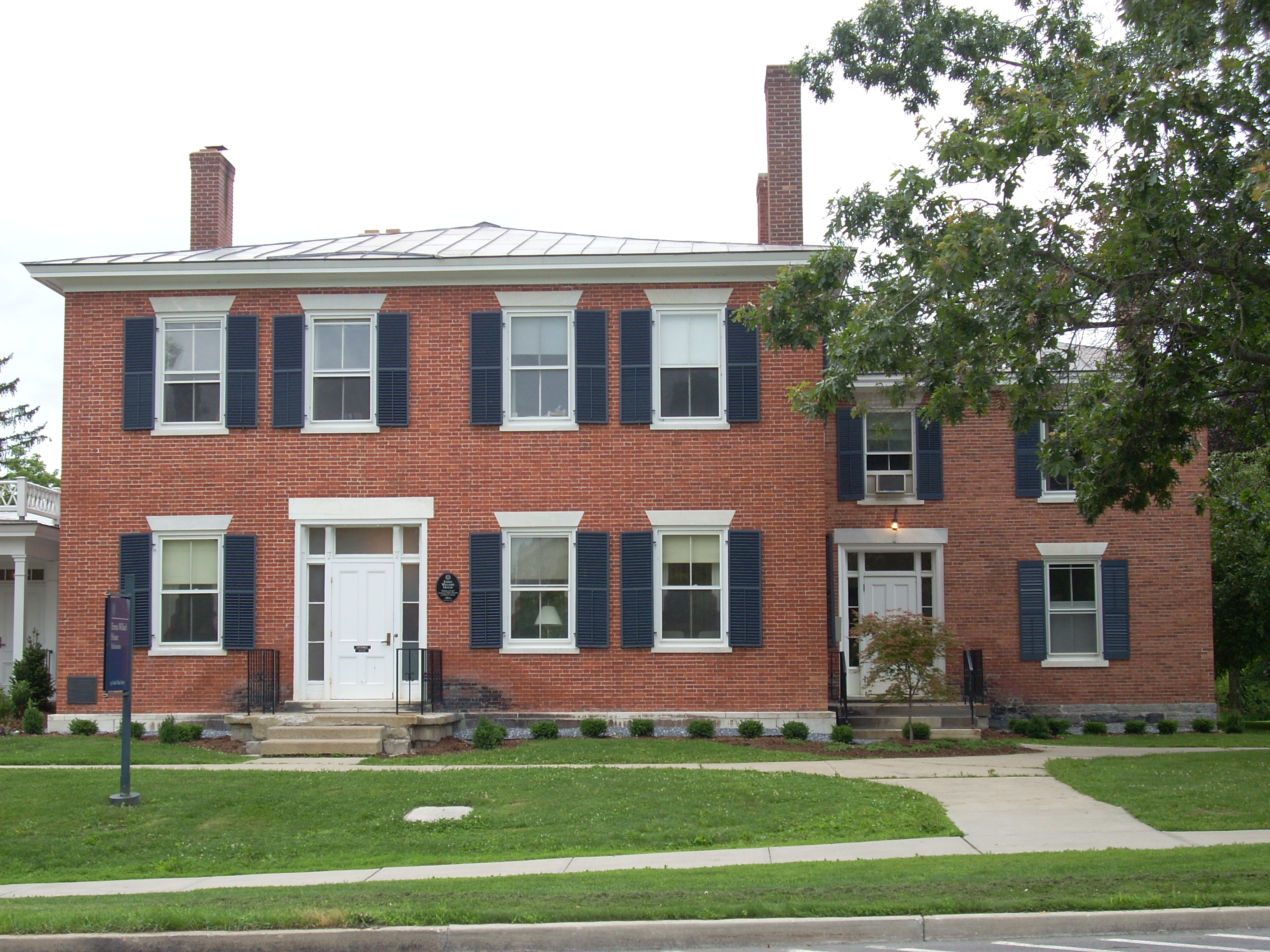
- The original section of the Emma Willard House

- Location within Vermont Location within the United States
- Location: 131 S. Main St., Middlebury, Vermont
- Coordinates: 44°0′27″N 73°10′29″W
- Area: 2.1 acres (0.85 ha)
- Built: 1809
- Architectural style: Federal
- NRHP reference No.: 66000798

Significant dates
- Added to NRHP: October 15, 1966
- Designated NHL: December 21, 1965

The Emma Willard House is a historic house at 131 South Main Street in Middlebury, Vermont, United States. Built in 1809, it was from 1809 to 1819 the home of Emma Willard (1787–1870), an influential pioneer in the development of women's education in the United States. Willard established a school for girls at her home in 1814 known as the Middlebury Female Seminary. The school was a precursor to the Emma Willard School, an all girl, private boarding and university preparatory day school opened by Willard in 1821 in Troy, New York. The house was declared a National Historic Landmark in 1965. It now houses the Middlebury College Admissions Office.

== Description and history ==
The Willard House is set on the south side of South Main Street, opposite the main part of the Middlebury College Campus and southwest of the town's center. The main block is a 2 1/2-story brick structure, four bays wide, with a hip roof and a stone foundation. A two-bay two-story brick ell extends to the rear at a recess from the right site, and a wood-frame ell is attached to this wing. The house has modest Federal styling, with granite lintels above the windows and doors. The main entrance is in one of the center bays of the main block, framed by sidelight windows and a multilight transom window; there is a similar second entrance at the front of the side wing. The interior of the house also has modest Federal styling.

The house was built in 1809 for Dr. John Willard and Emma Willard; he was 50 and she 22 when they married that year. Emma Hart Willard was born in 1787 and educated at home, developing an interest in teaching at an early age. She moved to Middlebury, where she supervised a girls' academy and studied the curriculum at Middlebury College. In 1814 she opened her Middlebury Female Seminary out of the family home to bring in additional income, and operated it there until 1819. In 1818 she proposed a plan for a model women's school to the New York State Legislature, but it was rejected. The people of Troy, New York offered her a building in which to open such a school, which was formally opened in 1821 as the Troy Female Seminary (now the Emma Willard School). In addition to managing the school, she taught classes and wrote textbooks, including volumes on geography and history that saw wide use. She retired from managing the school in 1838, but continued to be active in promoting school reform in general and female education in particular.

== See also ==
- Female seminary
- Women in education in the United States
- List of National Historic Landmarks in Vermont
- National Register of Historic Places listings in Addison County, Vermont
