= Joseph Philip Knight =

British clergyman, singer and composer

Joseph Philip Knight (Bradford-on-Avon, 26 July 1812 – Great Yarmouth, 1 June 1887) was a British clergyman, singer and one of Britain's most popular song composers. He published over 200 songs, first under the name Philip Mortimer then under his own name.

Knight was the son of an Anglican clergyman, Rev. Francis Knight, and went to America in 1839 to sing and teach music in a school run by Emma Willard, a proponent of women's education. He set to music her poem "Rocked in the Cradle of the Deep," which became a very popular hymn in the 19th century.

He set many of the lyrics of Thomas Haynes Bayly, and Thomas Moore wrote the words for him for "The Parting" and "Let's take the world as some wide scene".

== Selected songs ==
- "Of what is the Old Man thinking?"
- "The Veteran"
- "Days Gone By",
- "The Grecian Daughter"
- "She Wore a Wreath of Roses"
