= Elam Ives Jr. =

American music educator

Elam Ives Jr. (1802–1864) was a New England-based music teacher whose work with William Channing Woodbridge helped introduce the ideas of Johann Heinrich Pestalozzi into music education in the United States. His work also influenced Lowell Mason, whose work with Woodbridge eventually led to music education being introduced into the public schools of Boston.

== Early life and career ==
Little is known of Ives' early life. He was born to Elam Ives Sr., and Sarah Hitchcock Ives in Hamden, Connecticut, on 7 January 1802. He married Louisa Todd of Hamden on 15 April 1822, at which time he was already working as a singing teacher and choir director. He later moved to New Haven and then to Hartford sometime before 19 October 1827, when he was hired by the Christ Church there to teach music.

Ives worked with a friend and fellow musician, Deodatus Dutton, on a collection of hymn tunes called American Psalmody which also contained singing instructions by Ives.

== Work with William Channing Woodbridge ==
In 1829, a fellow citizen of Hartford, William Channing Woodbridge, returned from Europe, where he had been studying methods of education, and where he had spent time with Johann Heinrich Pestalozzi, Philipp Emanuel von Fellenberg, Michael Traugott Pfeiffer, and Hans Georg Nägeli. Upon returning to the United States, he wanted to use the methods he had seen in Europe to improve music teaching. He was friends with Dutton, who placed him in contact with Ives. Woodbridge provided Ives with books and materials by Nägeli, Pfeiffer, and Georg Friedrich Kübler, who then translated them with the help of Dutton and a Mr. Taylor from Andover.

Woodbridge by this time had become associated with Lowell Mason, a music teacher in Boston. He sent Mason to Hartford to work with Ives on the method. According to Ives, both had concerns about the method, but chose to proceed. After studying the Swiss works, and incorporating them into his teaching method, Ives put together an experimental choir of about 70 children during the summer of 1830. The choir evidently sang very well and word of its success was spread by Woodbridge to Boston and elsewhere.

== Work with Lowell Mason ==
During this same summer, Ives was working on a revision of the instruction portion of American Psalmody that would reflect the Pestalozzian-based ideas promoted by Woodbridge. He also began work on The American Elementary Singing Book that same year. Additionally, he began working with Mason on Juvenile Lyre, a collection of three-part children's songs, published in 1831. This collection consisted primarily of arrangements of songs by Nägeli and Pfeiffer, with some original compositions. There has been some debate over who wrote what in Juvenile Lyre; it appears that the Preface and final song, "Suffer Little Children to Come unto Me", are definitely by Mason, while many of the arrangements were done by Ives with versification of the German texts by Dutton. Other songs were originals by one of the composers, several with texts by Sarah Josepha Hale.

== Philadelphia and New York ==
Ives left Hartford for Philadelphia late in 1830, where he established the Philadelphia Musical Seminary. There, he taught violin, pianoforte, and singing. He also continued writing singing manuals and collections music, including materials for the American Sunday School Union. He also made a major revision of American Psalmody, removing most of the Pestalozzian elements introduced in the second edition.

Ives moved from Philadelphia to New York in 1836, where he started another musical academy. He continued publishing music collections with appended instruction manuals and an entire series intended specifically to help students learn to read music and sing. While in New York, Ives spent some time writing essays and periodical articles. He edited The Musical Review during its one-year run in 1838–39. He also wrote four articles for The Harbinger, a transcendentalist journal, beginning in 1847. Most of this writing concerned musical events, music educators, and music education materials.

In both Philadelphia and New York, Ives wrote parlor songs, though he was not a remarkable composer. Their difficulty and complexity do seem to indicate the quality of singers and pianists he was producing in his academies, though.

== Late career and death ==
Ives moved to Trenton, New Jersey, sometime before 1857. He lived there with his second wife, Lucy, and daughter, Ella. As in Philadelphia and New York, Ives established an academy of music.

At some point, Ives returned to his hometown of Hamden, Connecticut. He died there of apoplexy on 10 February 1864.
