= Middlebury to Her Soldiers =

Memorial in Middlebury, Vermont

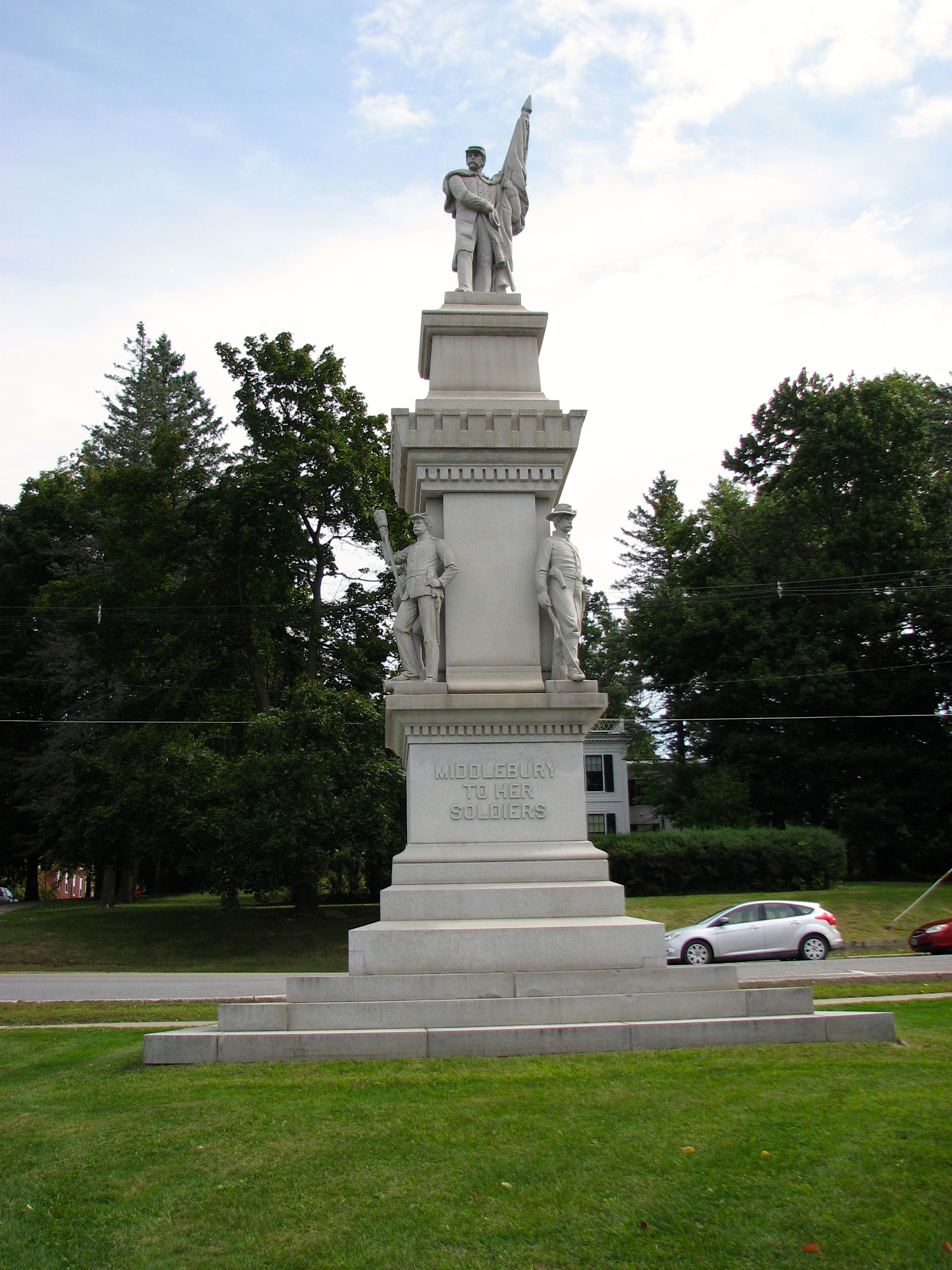
- Artist: Marshall Jones and Seward Jones
- Year: 1904–1905
- Type: granite
- Location: Middlebury, VT; 44°0′49.01″N 73°10′0.4″W
- Owner: Town of Middlebury, VT

Middlebury to Her Soldiers is a public artwork by American artists Marshall Jones and Seward Jones, located on the triangle between Merchant's Row and South Pleasant Street in Middlebury, VT, United States of America. It was fabricated by the Jones Brothers Company of Barre, VT. The granite sculpture consists of a figure in a Civil War uniform holding a flag in his proper right arm standing atop a multi-layered granite pedestal. Figures depicting an artilleryman, a cavalryman, a marine, and an infantryman stand at the four corners of the pedestal's central section.

== Description ==
On the west side, the base is inscribed "Middlebury to Her Soldiers". On the east side, the base is inscribed "Donated by S.A. Ilsley Erected 1905". Neither the sculptures nor the base are signed by the artists.

The sculpture is made of a light, fine grained medium Barre granite from the Jones Brothers company's quarry. It measures approximately 32 feet 1 inch high, with the base measuring approximately 2 feet 8 inches x 17 feet 6 inches x 17 feet 6 inches.

The sculpture has also been referred to as the Soldier's Monument, the Civil War Monument, the Ilsley Monument, and the Spanish American Monument.

== Historical information ==
The sculpture sits over a fire protection cistern which had been made obsolete after a water system had been installed in the village in 1902.

=== Acquisition ===
The sculpture was commissioned by Silas A. Ilsley (13 March 1840 – 9 January 1918) on 18 November 1904. Ilsley had served in the New York infantry during the Civil War and moved to Middlebury in 1901 following his retirement from the tinware business in Brooklyn, NY. He donated the monument to the town of Middlebury and the sculpture was dedicated 30 May 1905. The celebration of the dedication was reportedly attended by 7,000 people and included speeches, a parade, and fireworks.

== Artist ==
Marshall Jones and Seward Jones designed the sculpture which was fabricated by the Jones Brothers Company, founded in Boston, MA in 1882 and began operations in Barre, VT in 1886. The company's granite shed, now the home of the Vermont Granite Museum, is considered significant by the Vermont Division for Historic Preservation and was named one of "America's Treasures" by the United States Department of the Interior.

== Condition ==
This sculpture was documented as needing conservation treatment in 1992 as part of Save Outdoor Sculpture!, a campaign organized by Heritage Preservation: The National Institute of Conservation in partnership with the Smithsonian Institution, specifically the Smithsonian American Art Museum. Throughout the 1990s, over 7,000 volunteers cataloged and assessed the condition of over 30,000 publicly accessible statues, monuments, and sculptures installed as outdoor public art across the United States. In Vermont, the survey was sponsored by the Vermont Museum and Gallery Alliance from 1992 to 1993 where 110 volunteers surveyed 242 sculptures dating from 1740 to 1993. The archives from the project are maintained by the Vermont Historical Society.

== See also ==
- Vermont in the American Civil War
