= Henry Sheldon Museum of Vermont History =

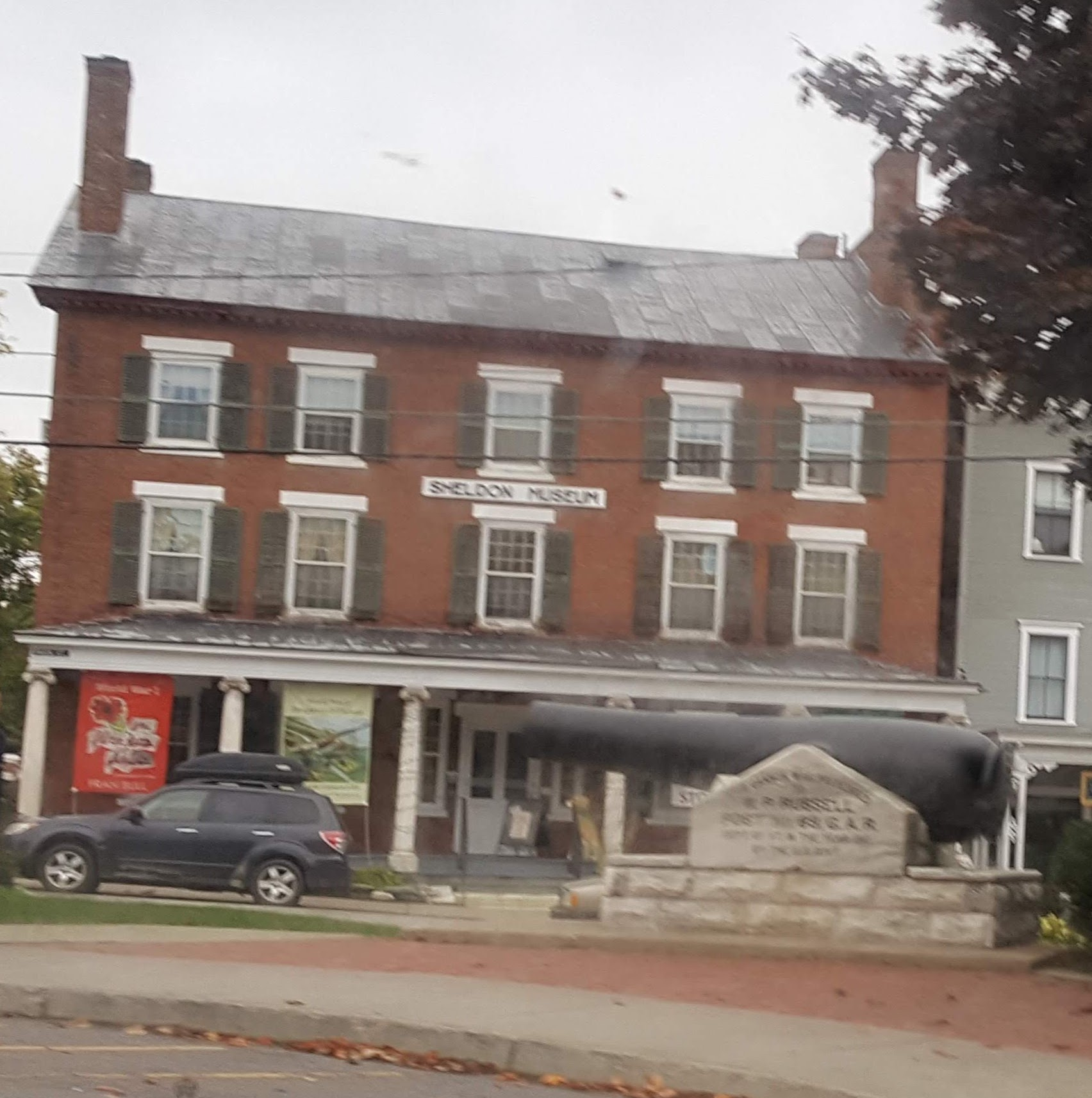
- Henry Sheldon Museum

- One Park Street; Middlebury, Vermont
- Established: 1882
- Coordinates: 44.01261°N 73.1699°W
- Type: History museum
- Founder: Henry Sheldon
- Website: henrysheldonmuseum.org

Henry Sheldon Museum of Vermont History, also known as the Sheldon Museum, is a history museum in Middlebury, Vermont created by Henry Sheldon in 1882 focusing on his private collections and the history of the state of Vermont, United States. It is located in the 1829 Judd-Harris House, a three-story brick Federal house, which showcases much of the museum's collections, including furniture, art, and artifacts.

The museum's Stewart-Swift Research Center houses and provides access to over two centuries of primary source materials documenting the history of Addison County, Vermont and other Vermont places.
