= Emma Willard =

American women's education activist (1787–1870)

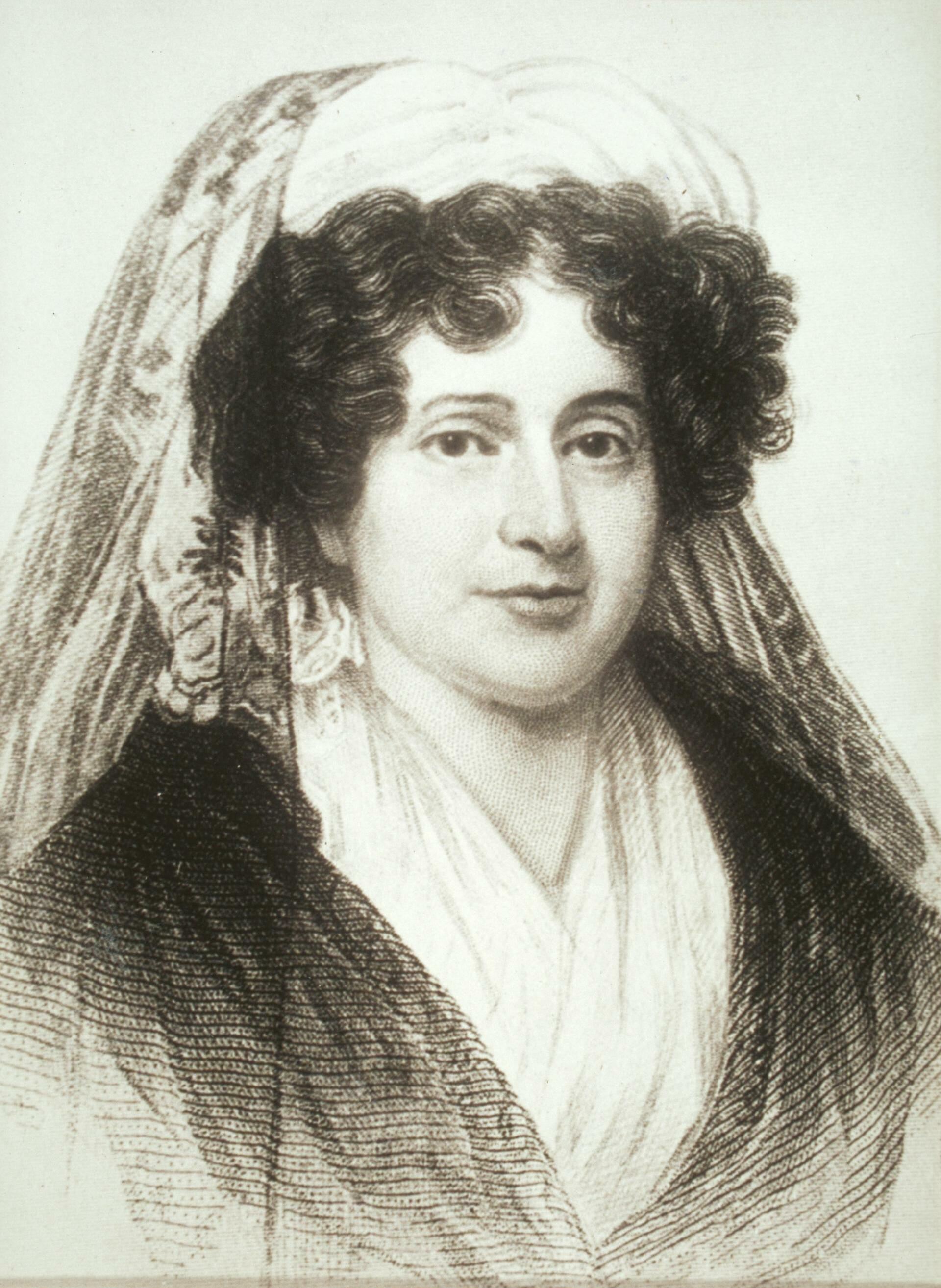
- Emma Willard, c. 1805–1815
- Born: Emma Hart; February 23, 1787; Berlin, Connecticut, U.S.
- Died: April 15, 1870 (aged 83); Troy, New York, U.S.
- Occupations: Educator, author, women's rights activist

Emma Willard (née Hart; February 23, 1787 – April 15, 1870) was an American female education activist who dedicated her life to education. She worked in several schools and founded the first school for women's higher education in the United States, the Troy Female Seminary in Troy, New York. With the success of her school, Willard was able to travel across the country and abroad to promote education for women. The seminary was renamed the Emma Willard School in 1895 in her honor.

== Early life ==
Emma Willard was born on February 23, 1787, in Berlin, Connecticut. She was the sixteenth of seventeen children from her father, Samuel Hart, and his second wife Lydia Hinsdale Hart. Her father was a farmer who encouraged his children to read and think for themselves. When Willard was young, her father recognized her passion for learning. At that time women were only provided basic education, but Willard was included in family discussions such as politics, philosophy, world politics and mathematics that were primarily male subjects. At age 15, Willard was enrolled in her first school in 1802 in her hometown of Berlin. She progressed so quickly that just two years later at the age of 17 she was teaching there. Willard eventually took charge of the academy for a term in 1806.

== Career ==
In 1807, Willard left Berlin and briefly worked in Westfield, Massachusetts, before accepting a job offer at a female academy in Middlebury, Vermont. She held the position of principal at the academy from 1807 to 1809. She was unimpressed by the material taught there and opened a boarding school for girls, the Middlebury Female Seminary in 1814, in her own home. She was inspired by the subjects her nephew, John Willard, was learning at Middlebury College and strove to improve the curriculum that was taught at girls' schools.

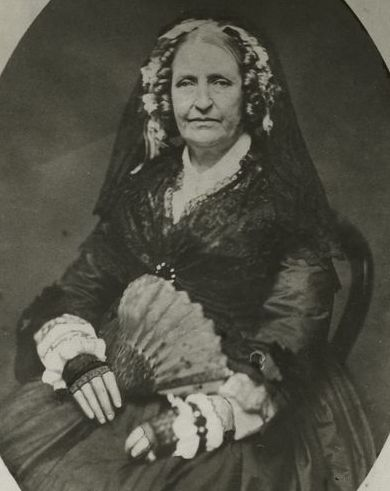
Emma Willard, circa 1860

Willard believed that women could master topics like mathematics and philosophy rather than just subjects taught at finishing schools. This passion for women's education led her to work for the first women's school for higher education. Her success inspired her to share her ideas on education and to write A Plan for Improving Female Education in 1819, a pamphlet that she presented to the members of the New York Legislature. Her pamphlet rejected contemporary ideas that women did not need a literary or scientific education. For example, the year before, Thomas Jefferson wrote a letter in which he suggested women should not read novels, calling them a "mass of trash" with few exceptions, and added that "For a like reason too much poetry should not be indulged."

In her speech to the legislature, Willard said that existing women's education was inadequate both in the amount girls received compared to boys and in its foundational principles. One issue she took was that women's education "has been too exclusively directed, to fit them for displaying to advantage the charms of youth and beauty". Another was "it has been made the first object in educating our sex, to prepare them to please the other" while "reason and religion teach, that we too are primary existencies... not the satellites of men." Her plan included a proposal for a women's seminary to be publicly funded just as men's schools were.

Willard did not receive a response from the legislators, several of whom believed women's education to be contrary to God's will. Willard finally received support from New York Governor DeWitt Clinton, who invited her to open a school there. Originally Willard opened an institution in Waterford, New York but she did not receive the promised financial support and therefore moved her school to Troy, New York, where she received more support and funding.

The Troy Female Seminary opened in September 1821 for boarding and day students. This was the first school in the United States to offer higher education for women. The curriculum consisted of the subjects she had longed to include in women's education: mathematics, philosophy, geography, history, and science. Willard led the school to success, and in 1831, the school had enrolled over 300 students.

The school attracted students from wealthy families or families of high position. Although most of the students would still end up as housewives, Willard never hindered her students' pursuit towards women's education and continued to fight for their rights. Despite her reputation today in women's history, Willard was not a supporter of the women's suffrage movement during the mid-19th century. Willard believed that women's education was a much more important matter.

== Marriage and family ==
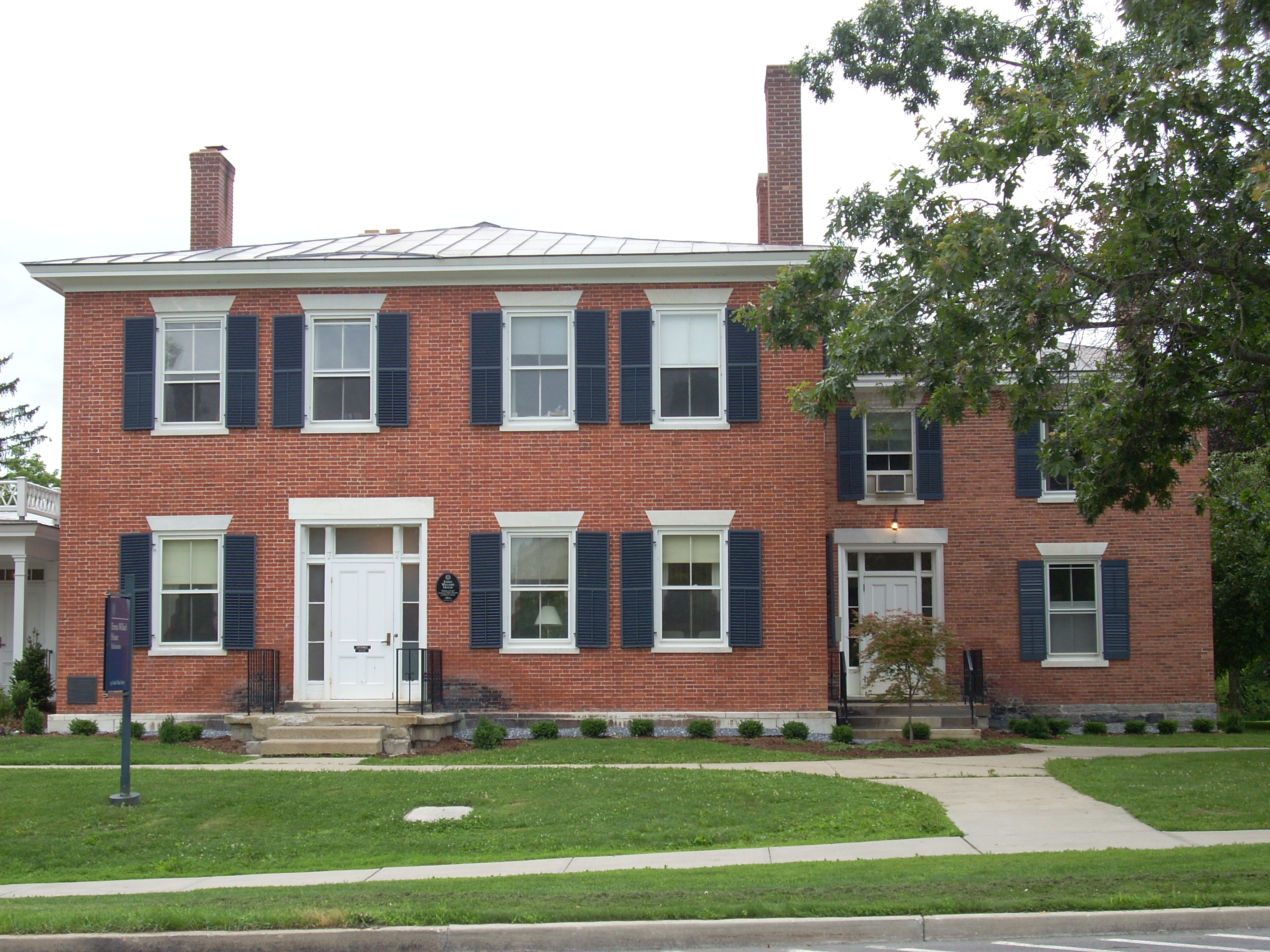
The Emma Willard House in Middlebury

While working at the academy in Middlebury, Willard met her future husband John Willard. He was a physician and 28 years her senior. John Willard brought four children to the marriage from his previous marriages. His nephew, also named John Willard, lived with them while attending Middlebury College, which gave Emma Willard much inspiration in forming her educational views. Emma Willard's younger sister, Almira Hart Lincoln Phelps, joined Emma in 1823, after the death of her first husband, Simeon Lincoln, and taught at Troy Female Seminary for eight years.

Emma and John Willard had one son together, named John Willard Hart, who received the management of the Troy Female Seminary when Willard left it in 1838. Emma's first husband died in 1825, and in 1838, she married Christopher C. Yates but was divorced from him in 1843.

== Works ==
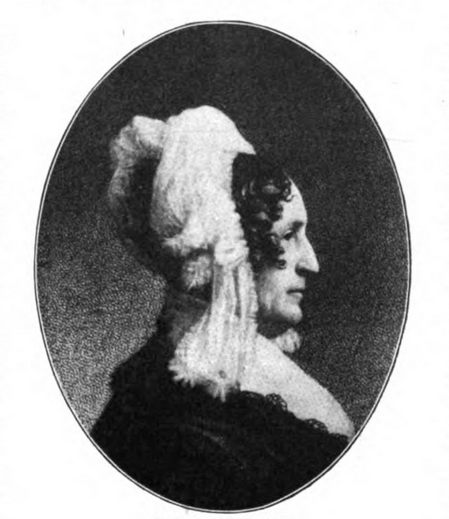
Undated photo

Along with the profits made from the Troy Female Seminary, Willard also made a living from her writing. She wrote several textbooks throughout her lifetime, including books on history and geography. Some of her works are History of the United States, or Republic of America (1828), A System of Fulfillment of a Promise (1831), A Treatise on the Motive Powers which Produce the Circulation of the Blood (1846), Guide to the Temple of Time and Universal History for Schools (1849), Last Leaves of American History (1849), Astronography; or Astronomical Geography (1854), and Morals for the Young (1857). Willard's history and geography texts included women as well as men and emphasized the status of women as the primary determinant in whether a society could be described as civilized.

In 1830, she made a tour of Europe. Three years later, she donated the proceeds from her book about her travels to a school for women that she helped to found in Athens, Greece. This book was reviewed alongside Abby Jane Morrell's account of her travels in the sub-Antarctic, and they were described as "the productions of our self-taught countrywomen who [are] ... creditable to their sex". Willard also published a book of poetry, The Fulfilment of a Promise (1831).

Her most popular poem, entitled "Rocked in the Cradle of the Deep," which she reportedly wrote while on an ocean voyage in 1839, was set to music by Joseph Philip Knight and became a very popular hymn in the 19th century.

== Atlas and geography textbooks ==
Willard cowrote The Woodbridge and Willard Geographies and Atlases (1823) with American geographer William Channing Woodbridge. She co-authored with him A System of Universal Geography on the Principles of Comparison and Classification. Willard and Woodbridge created the first widely used historical atlas of the U.S. The maps, graphs, and pictures integrated the details of the nation's geography into the broad popular image of the country as a large, powerful complex nation. Her map-drawing geographic pedagogy became popular in the United States and also influential in American missionary schools in South Asia during the nineteenth century.

== Later life and death ==
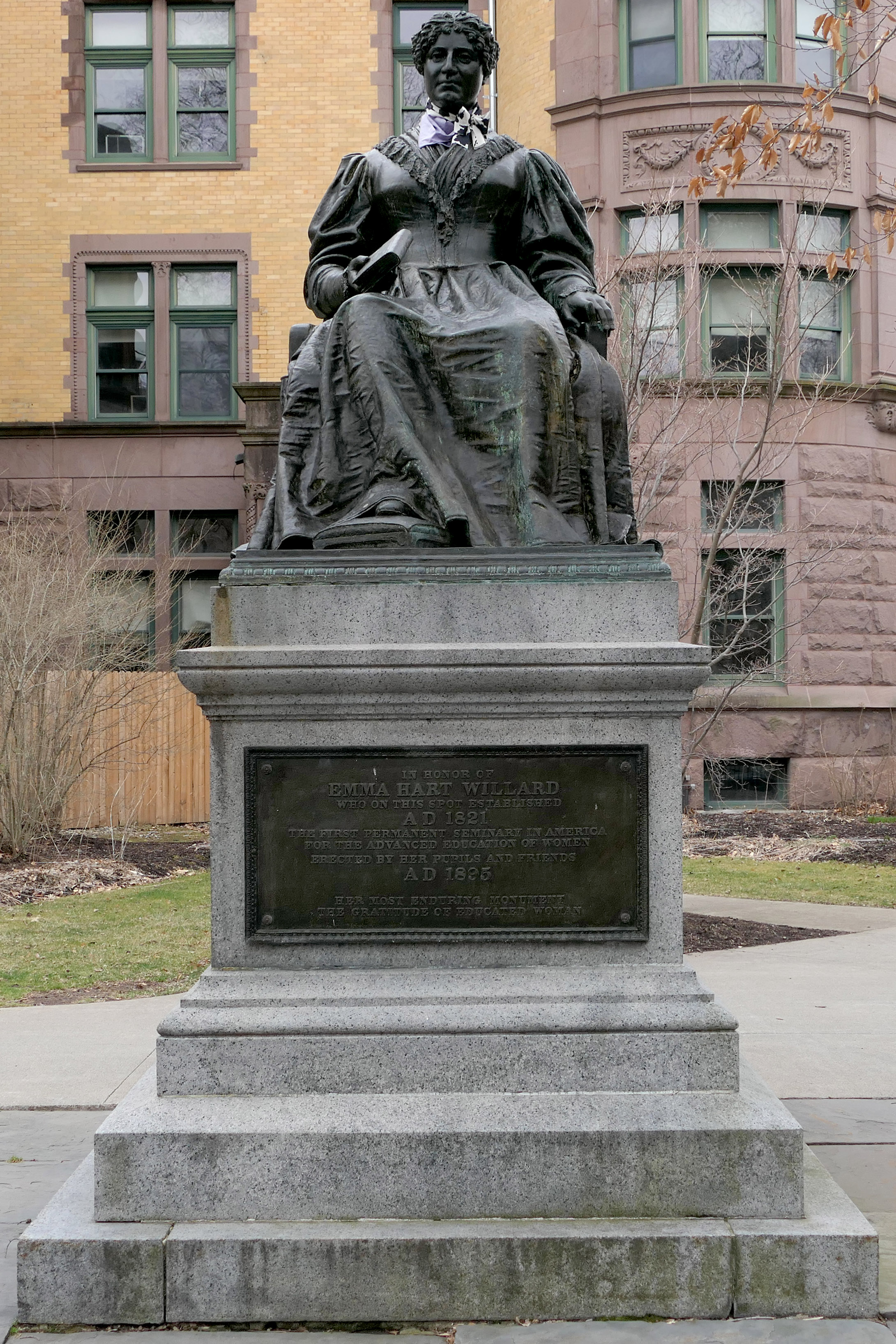
Statue at Russell Sage College

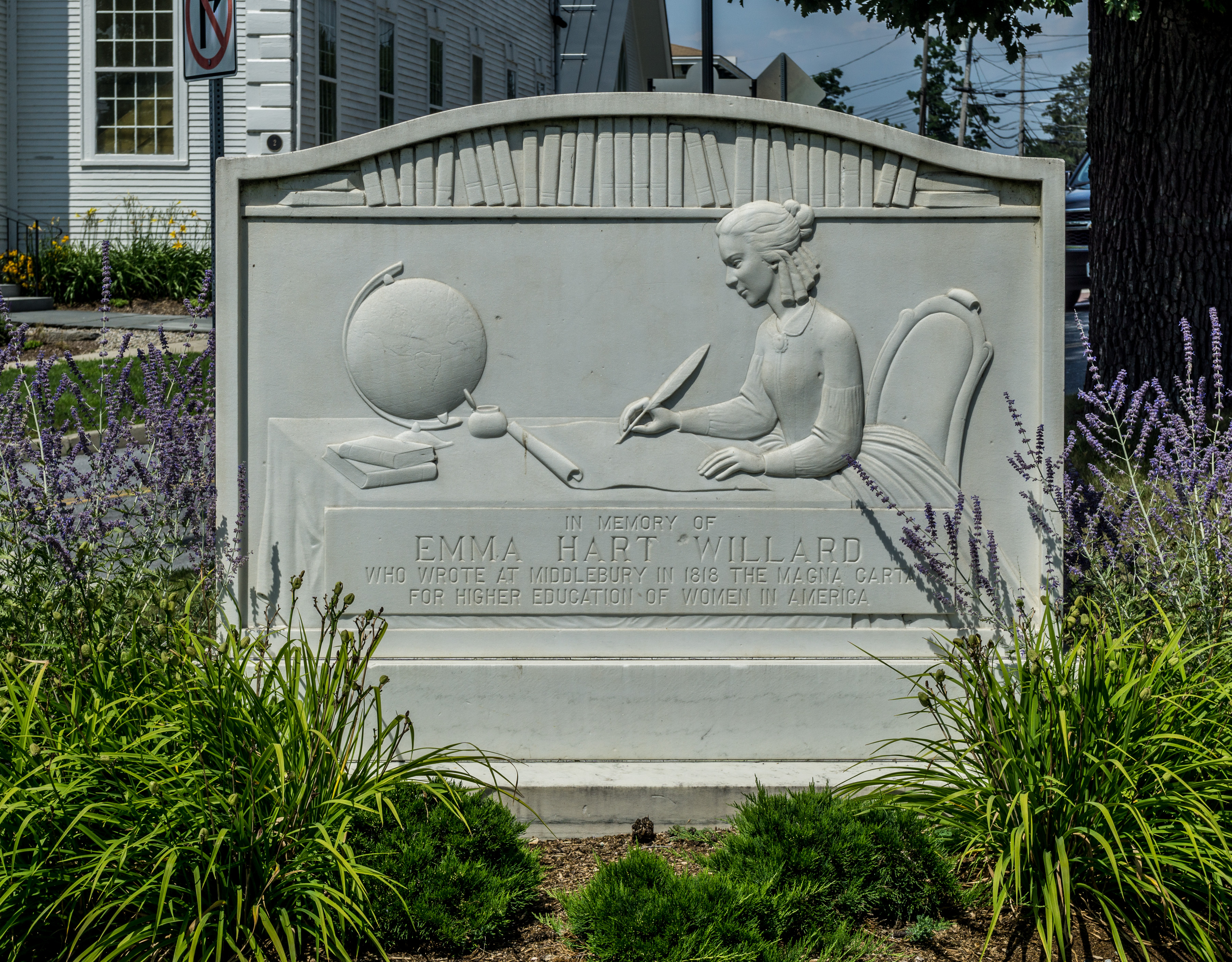
Emma Willard Memorial

John Willard, Emma's husband, died in 1825. She headed the Troy Female Seminary until she remarried in 1838, and left the school in the hands of her son and daughter-in-law. She married Dr. Christopher Yates and moved to Boston with him. He gave up his career, but after nine months of marriage they separated, and a decree nisi was granted in 1843.

She spent her later years traveling across America and throughout Europe to promote women's education. In support of her efforts, she published a number of articles and presented lectures across the country to promote the cause. Her personal assistant was Celia M. Burleigh. Willard's efforts helped to establish a school for women in Athens, Greece. Emma Willard died on April 15, 1870, in Troy, New York and was interred at Oakwood Cemetery.

== Legacy and honors ==
The Troy Female Seminary was renamed the Emma Willard School in 1892 in her honor and today is still promoting her strong belief in women's education. A statue honoring her services to the cause of higher education was erected in Troy in 1895 and stands on what is now the Russell Sage College campus.

A marble memorial was erected in Middlebury in 1941. In 1905, Willard was inducted into the Hall of Fame for Great Americans in the Bronx, New York. In 2013, Willard was inducted into the National Women's Hall of Fame.

She has been the subject of several biographies. Her geographies are discussed by Calhoun and her histories by Baym.

== See also ==
- Chronographer, a type of graphic developed by Willard to display historical events
