= John Willard (U.S. Marshal) =

U.S. Marshal for Vermont

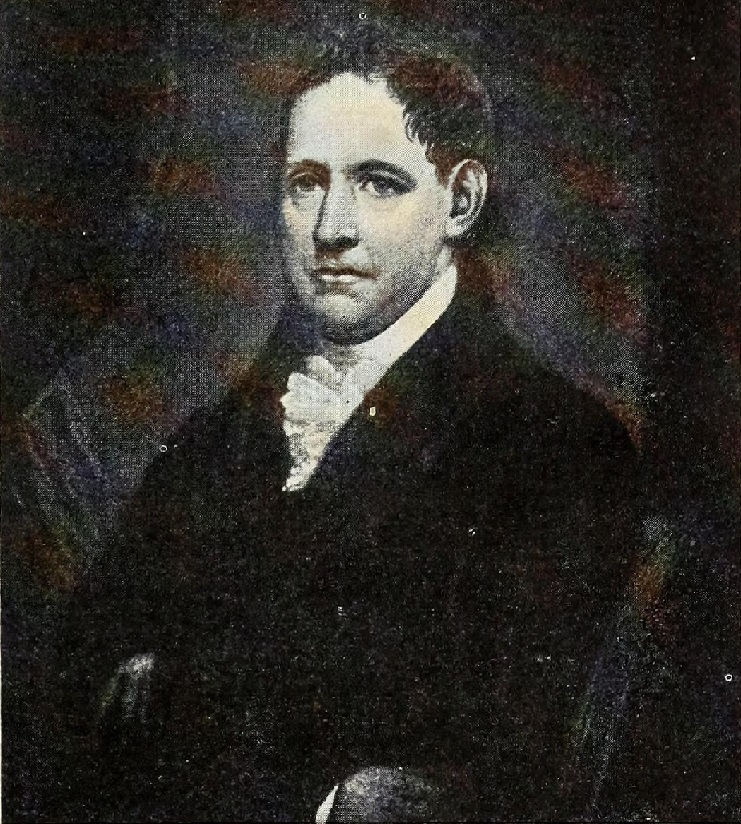
- From the January 1902 edition of The New England Magazine

United States Marshal for the District of Vermont
- In office March 11, 1801 – January 6, 1811
- Preceded by: Jabez G. Fitch
- Succeeded by: David Robinson

Personal details
- Born: July 23, 1759 East Guilford, Connecticut, U.S.
- Died: May 29, 1825 (aged 65) Troy, New York, U.S.
- Resting place: Oakwood Cemetery, Troy, New York
- Party: Democratic-Republican
- Spouse(s): Esther Wilcox; Mindwell Meigs; Emma Willard
- Children: 5
- Relatives: John Willard (nephew)
- Occupation: Physician

John Willard (July 23, 1759 – May 29, 1825) was a physician and businessman from Vermont. A veteran of the American Revolution, he was most notable for his service as United States Marshal for Vermont from 1801 to 1811 and as the business manager for the educational endeavors of Emma Willard, who was his third wife.

== Life ==
John Willard was born in East Guilford, Connecticut on July 23, 1759, a son of John Willard (1722–1767) and Mary (Horton) Willard (1728–1807). He was educated in East Guilford and served on a ship's crew at the start of the American Revolution. He was captured by the British, and after his release he became the quartermaster of a Connecticut regiment.

After the war, Willard trained with a local physician and became a medical doctor. He then moved to Middlebury, Vermont, where he established a practice. Willard became a member of the Democratic–Republican Party and supported Thomas Jefferson for president in 1800. After Jefferson won, he appointed Willard as United States Marshal for Vermont, succeeding Jabez G. Fitch. Willard served until 1811, and was succeeded by David Robinson.

Willard later gave up the practice of medicine for a career in farming, business and banking. He was a director of the Vermont State Bank in Middlebury in 1812 when the bank was unable to account for $28,000 in missing funds (about $418,000 in 2019). The directors and managers of the bank could not explain the shortage, and a court judgment in favor of the depositors resulted in liens against Willard's property. Emma Willard decided to open a boarding school for female students in order to generate income for the family, and Willard became the business manager. Later investigation revealed that the bank had been entered and the money stolen by means of a duplicate key. The key was found and the thief exposed, so the liens against Willard's property were removed. Despite the success of his wife's school, Willard's personal finances did not recover after the bank theft, and he was insolvent at the time of his death.

In 1819, the Willards moved their female seminary to Waterford, New York after the state legislature enacted a law providing financial aid for the education of women. In 1822, they moved the Emma Willard School to Troy, New York.

Willard died in Troy on May 29, 1825. He was first buried at a local cemetery in Troy, then reinterred in 1868 at Oakwood Cemetery in Troy.

== Family ==
Willard first married Esther Wilcox, who died in 1788. His second wife was Mindwell Meigs (1758–1804), the widow of Thaddeus Frisbie. In 1809, Willard married Emma Hart of Middlebury.

With his first wife, Willard was the father of a son, Gustavus Vasa Willard (1787–1854). With his second wife, he was the father of William Tell Willard (1796–1866), Benjamin Franklin Willard (1798–1823) and Laura. With Emma Willard, John Willard was the father of John Hart Willard (1810–1883).

Willard's relatives included nephew John Willard (1792–1862). The younger John Willard was an attorney who became a prominent state court judge in New York.

== Legacy ==
The Middlebury home Willard built in 1809, now known as the Emma Willard House, was declared a National Historic Landmark in 1965. It was acquired by Middlebury College and is the site of the college's admissions office.

== Sources ==
=== Books ===
- Memorial of John Willard, LL.D. Saratoga Springs, NY: G. M. Davison. 1863 – via Google Books.
- Jefferson, Thomas (2013). Oberg, Barbara B. (ed.). The Papers of Thomas Jefferson. Vol. 40. Princeton, NJ: Princeton University Press. ISBN 978-0-691-16037-5 – via Google Books.
- Willard, Joseph; Walker, Charles Wilkes; Pope, Charles Henry (1915). Willard Genealogy. Boston, MA: The Willard Family Association. ISBN 978-5-8728-0992-0 – via Google Books.

=== Magazines ===
- Bartlett, Ellen Strong (January 1902). "Emma Willard, a Pioneer of Education for Women". The New England Magazine. Boston, MA: J. N. McClinctock and Company – via Internet Archive.

=== Newspapers ===
- "Death Notice, Dr. John Willard". Charleston Daily Courier. Charleston, SC. June 21, 1825 – via Newspapers.com.
- "John Willard's Estate". National Standard. Middlebury, VT. April 4, 1826 – via Newspapers.com.

=== Internet ===
- Rettig, Polly M. (December 2, 1974). "National Register of Historic Places Inventory – Nomination Form – Emma Willard House". NPS.gov. Washington, DC: National Park Service.
- Van Buren, Lin. "Burial Number 2968, John Willard (died May 1825)". Oakwood Cemetery, Troy, New York, 1851–1872 Interments. RootsWeb.com.
