= Jabez G. Fitch =

U.S. Marshal for Vermont

United States Marshal for the District of Vermont
- In office June 9, 1794 – March 10, 1801
- Preceded by: Lewis R. Morris
- Succeeded by: John Willard

Personal details
- Born: March 20, 1764 Norwich, Connecticut, U.S.
- Died: July 31, 1824 (aged 60) Warsaw, New York, U.S.
- Resting place: Warsaw Cemetery, Warsaw, New York
- Party: Federalist
- Spouse: Speedy Goodrich (d. 1806)
- Children: 5
- Relatives: Ebenezer Fitch (brother)
- Occupation: Businessman

Jabez G. Fitch (March 20, 1764 - July 31, 1824) was a businessman and political figure from Vermont. Among the offices in which he served was United States Marshal for Vermont, a position he held from 1794 to 1801.

== Life ==
=== Early life ===
Jabez Gale Fitch was born in Norwich, Connecticut, on March 20, 1764, a son of Dr. Jabez Fitch (1729-1806) and Lydia (Huntington) Fitch (1735-1803). Fitch was raised and educated in Norwich, and his numerous brothers and sisters included Ebenezer Fitch, the first president of Williams College. During the American Revolution, Fitch went into the naval service while still a boy and he served on the Patriot side until the end of the war. He served in the militia in Vermont, and attained the rank of colonel, the title by which he was commonly addressed.

=== Career ===
When his parents and several siblings moved to Vermont in the late 1780s, Fitch joined them in relocating to the area around Vergennes. He was active in the local Masonic lodge, served in local offices including town lister, and was involved in civic projects including construction of a courthouse in Vergennes.

Fitch became a merchant and trader. His enterprises included speculating in land, mills, an iron works, and producing lumber and potash for transport to markets in Quebec via Lake Champlain. In 1801, he purchased title to the town of Coventry from Ira Allen, then sold lots at moderate prices to encourage settlement in the area.

An early adherent of the Federalist Party, Fitch served in appointed offices including deputy U.S. Marshal. In 1794, Vermont's first U.S. Marshal, Lewis R. Morris, resigned. Fitch was appointed to succeed Morris, and served until 1801. His tenure was most notable for his imprisonment of Democratic-Republican Party politician Matthew Lyon during Lyon's arrest and trial for violating the Alien and Sedition Acts. Lyon's constituents reelected him to Congress while he was in jail; after the law against sedition expired in 1801, Thomas Jefferson, the first Democratic-Republican president, replaced Fitch as U.S. Marshal with John Willard, a supporter of the Democratic-Republican Party.

In the early 1820s, Fitch became overextended and his holdings were seized to satisfy creditors. He subsequently moved to Western New York to live with relatives.

=== Death ===
Fitch died in Warsaw, New York, on July 31, 1824. He was buried at Warsaw Cemetery (also known as Warsaw Pioneer Cemetery).

=== Family ===
Fitch was married to Speedy Goodrich (d. 1806). They were the parents of two sons and three daughters.

== Sources ==
=== Books ===
- Records Of The Grand Lodge Of Free And Accepted Masons Of The State Of Vermont. Burlington, VT: The Free Press Association. 1879 – via Internet Archive.
- Durfee, Calvin (1843). Memoir of Rev. Ebenezer Fitch, D.D. Boston, MA: T. R. Marvin – via Google Books.
- Graham, John H. (1892). History of Freemasonry in the Province of Quebec (PDF). Montreal, Canada: John Lovell & Son.
- Smith, Henry Perry (1886). History of Addison County, Vermont. Syracuse, NY: D. Mason & Co. – via Internet Archive.

=== Internet ===
- "Town Facts: Coventry, Vermont". Old Stone House Museum. Brownington, VT: Orleans County County Historical Society.
- "To George Washington from Samuel Hitchcock, 16 May 1794". Founders Online. Washington, DC: National Archives and Records Administration.
- "Connecticut Town Birth Records, pre-1870, Entry for Jabez Gale Fitch". Ancestry.com. Lehi, UT: Ancestry.com LLC.

=== Magazines ===
- Wyoming County Historian (1975). "Biography, Jabez G. Fitch". Historical Wyoming. Vol. 22–26. Warsaw, NY: Wyoming County (NY) Historical Society – via Google Books. "The article stated that in an early period of the Revolution Fitch entered naval service of his country and continued in the navy until the recognition of American independence."
- "Newspaper Index, Entry for Jabez Fitch". Journal of the Western New York Genealogical Society. Buffalo, NY: Western New York Genealogical Society. 1980 – via Google Books.

=== Newspapers ===
- "Wedding Announcement: Howard Bosworth and Elizabeth Fitch". Northern Sentinel. Burlington, VT. December 5, 1823 – via Newspapers.com.
