= Middlebury, Vermont =

- Town
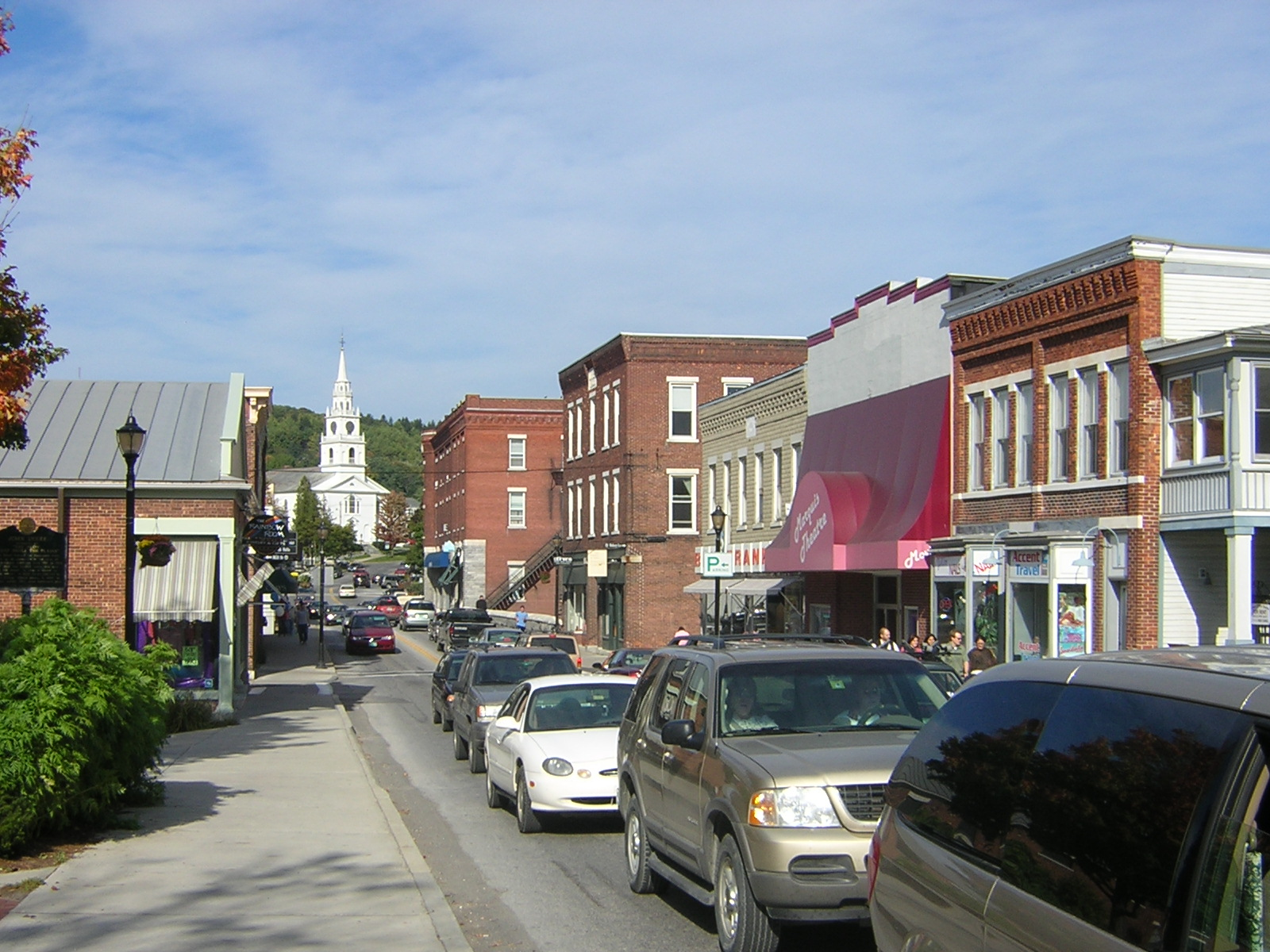
- Main Street

- Seal

- Location in Addison County and the state of Vermont
- Coordinates: 44°00′16″N 73°07′20″W
- Country: United States
- State: Vermont
- County: Addison
- Chartered: 1761
- Communities: Middlebury; East Middlebury; Farmingdale

Area
  - Total: 39.2 sq mi (101.6 km^{2})
  - Land: 38.8 sq mi (100.6 km^{2})
  - Water: 0.39 sq mi (1.0 km^{2})
- Elevation: 479 ft (146 m)

Population (2020)
  - Total: 9,152
  - Density: 235.6/sq mi (90.97/km^{2})
- Time zone: UTC-5 (Eastern (EST))
  - Summer (DST): UTC-4 (EDT)
- ZIP Code: 05753
- Area code: 802
- FIPS code: 50-44350
- GNIS feature ID: 1462146
- Website: www.townofmiddlebury.org

Middlebury is the shire town (county seat) of Addison County, Vermont, United States. As of the 2020 census, the population was 9,152. Middlebury is home to Middlebury College and the Henry Sheldon Museum of Vermont History and the adjacent hardware store.

== History ==
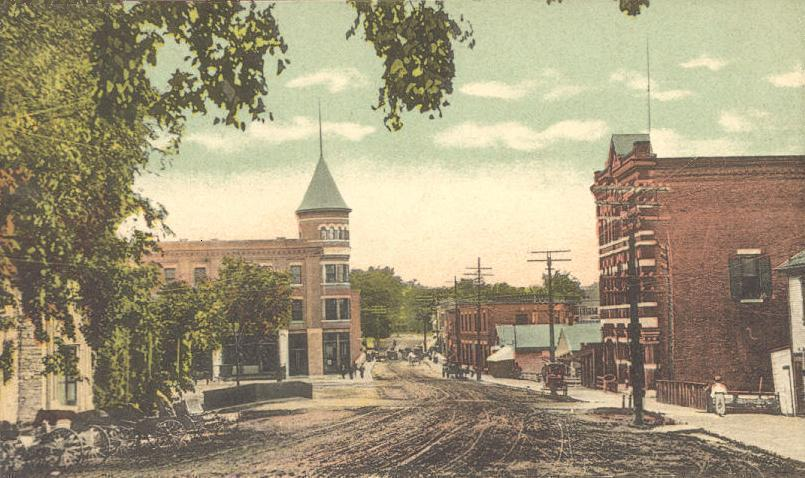
Main Street in 1908

One of the New Hampshire Grants, Middlebury was chartered by Colonial Governor Benning Wentworth on November 2, 1761. The name "Middlebury" came from its location between the towns of Salisbury and New Haven. It was awarded to John Evarts and 62 others. The French and Indian Wars ended in 1763; the first settlers arrived in 1766. John Chipman was the first to clear his land, Lot Seven. During the Revolutionary War, much of the town was burned in Carleton's Raid on November 6, 1778. After the war concluded in 1783, settlers returned to rebuild homes, clear forests and establish farms. The principal crops were grains and hay.

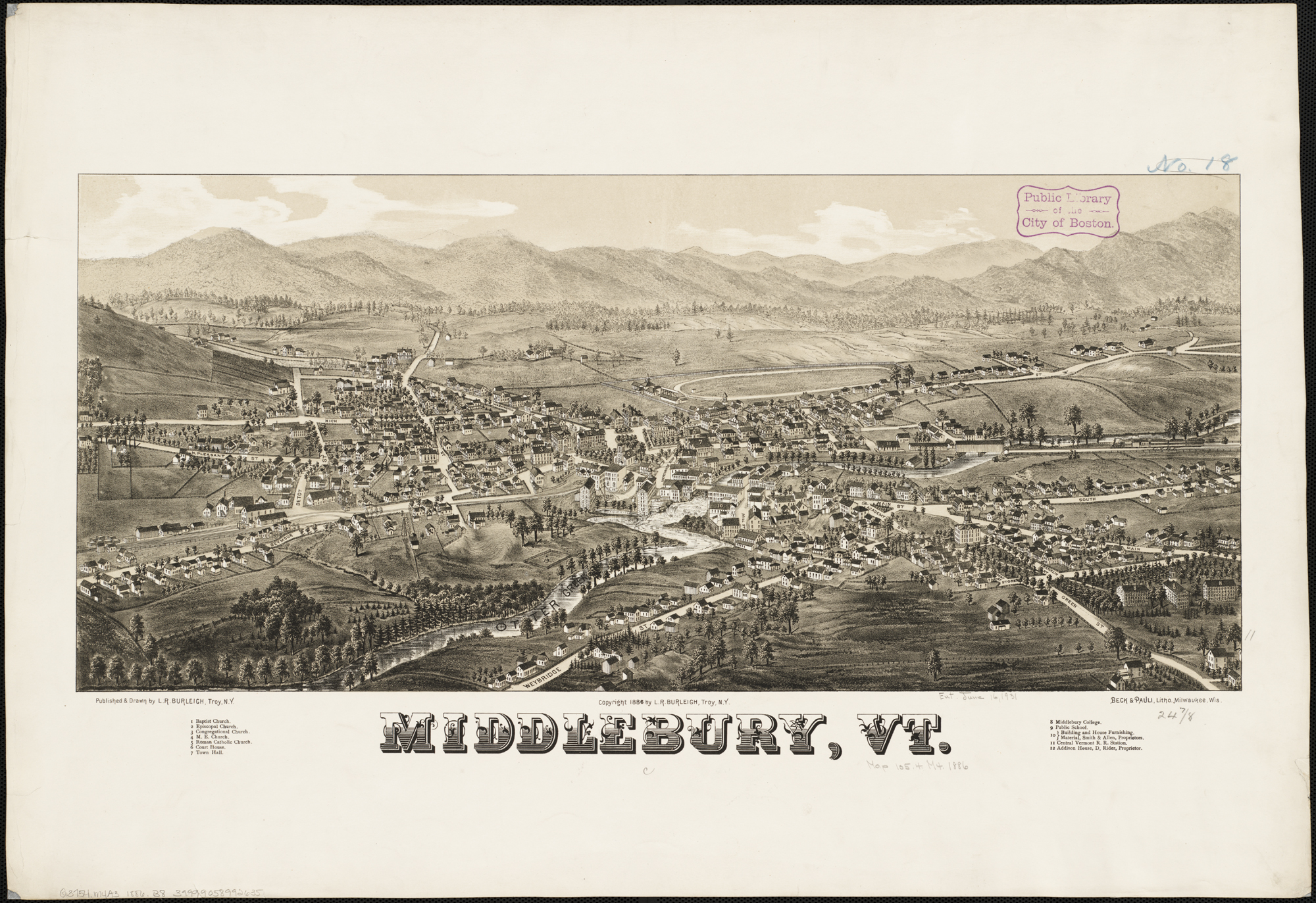
Lithograph of Middlebury from 1886 by L.R. Burleigh with list of landmarks

Landowners vied for the lucrative honor of having the village center grow on their properties. A survey dispute with Salisbury led to the forfeiture of Gamaliel Painter's farm to that town, and his transition from farming to developing Middlebury Village near his and Abisha Washburn's mill, together with other mills that surrounded the Otter Creek falls. Industries would include a cotton factory, sawmill, gristmill, pail factory, paper mill, woolen factory, iron foundry, and marble quarry. The Rutland & Burlington Railroad first arrived on September 1, 1849. Around 1830, Middlebury was the second-largest town in Vermont.

Middlebury College, one of the United States' elite liberal arts colleges, was founded in 1800. It is a member of the NESCAC. In the summer, the town plays host to the annual Middlebury College Language Schools, as well as the college's Bread Loaf Writers' Conference, the oldest surviving conference of its kind in the nation.

On January 2, 1838, a group of Patriote refugees from the Lower Canada Rebellion met in Middlebury to plan their future course of action. It was attended by two major Patriote leaders, Louis-Joseph Papineau and Robert Nelson, but they were not able to agree on a unified plan.

On October 22, 2007, central Middlebury was evacuated for a short time because of a train derailment; the Middlebury Union Middle School served as the evacuation headquarters.

Today, as the largest town by population in Addison County, Middlebury serves as the commercial and business center for the region. Downtown hosts a three-screen movie theater, the post office, and two historic inns, as well as many shops and restaurants. There is considerable development along U.S. Route 7 heading south of town, including two supermarkets, two drugstores, most of the town's gas stations, and several fast-food spots. Of note is Middlebury's A&W, Vermont's only remaining car-hop restaurant and a popular spot with both locals and Middlebury College students.

== Geography ==
Middlebury is located near the center of Addison County in western Vermont. The town is drained by Otter Creek, which flows from south to north along the western edge of the town, with the falls at the center of the village. The Middlebury River flows west to Otter Creek out of the mountains. Chipman Hill, a hill of glacial till, rises 450 feet (140 m) above the village just to the northeast. Foothills of the Green Mountains border the town to the east, with the Champlain Valley to the west.

According to the United States Census Bureau, the town has a total area of 39.2 square miles (101.6 km^{2}), of which 38.8 square miles (100.6 km^{2}) is land and 0.39 square miles (1.0 km^{2}), or 1.00%, is water.

Middlebury is crossed by U.S. Route 7, Vermont Route 23, Vermont Route 30, Vermont Route 116, and Vermont Route 125. It is bordered by the towns of New Haven and Bristol to the north, Ripton to the east, Cornwall and Weybridge to the west, and Salisbury to the south. A new bridge over Otter Creek connecting Cross Street to Bakery Lane opened in November 2010 to serve as a shortcut and alleviate traffic through downtown. The village of East Middlebury is located in the southern part of the town, east of U.S. Route 7.

=== Climate ===
This climatic region is typified by large seasonal temperature differences, with warm to hot (and often humid) summers and cold (sometimes severely cold) winters. According to the Köppen Climate Classification system, Middlebury has a humid continental climate, abbreviated "Dfb" on climate maps.

== Demographics ==
Historical population
Census	Pop.	Note	%±
1790	395		—
1800	1,263		219.7%
1810	2,138		69.3%
1820	2,535		18.6%
1830	3,468		36.8%
1840	3,162		−8.8%
1850	3,517		11.2%
1860	2,879		−18.1%
1870	3,086		7.2%
1880	2,993		−3.0%
1890	2,793		−6.7%
1900	3,045		9.0%
1910	2,848		−6.5%
1920	2,914		2.3%
1930	2,968		1.9%
1940	3,175		7.0%
1950	4,778		50.5%
1960	5,305		11.0%
1970	6,532		23.1%
1980	7,574		16.0%
1990	8,034		6.1%
2000	8,183		1.9%
2010	8,496		3.8%
2020	9,152		7.7%
U.S. Decennial Census

As of the census of 2010, there were 8,494 people, 2,860 households, and 1,642 families residing in the town. The population density was 209.7 people per square mile (80.9/km^{2}). There were 2,805 housing units at an average density of 71.9 per square mile (27.7/km^{2}). The racial makeup of the town was 90.3% White, 4.3% Asian, 3.0% Hispanic or Latino of any race, 3.0% from two or more races, 1.3% Black or African American, 0.66% from other races, 0.2% Native American and 0.02% Pacific Islander.

There were 2,657 households, out of which 27.7% had children under the age of 18 living with them, 44.6% were couples living together and joined in either marriage or civil union, 10.4% had a female householder with no husband present, and 42.3% were non-families. 35.3% of all households were made up of individuals, and 14.4% had someone living alone who was 65 years of age or older. The average household size was 2.24 and the average family size was 2.90.

In the town, the population was spread out, with 17.5% under the age of 18, 31.4% from 18 to 24, 18.6% from 25 to 44, 19.3% from 45 to 64, and 13.3% who were 65 years of age or older. The median age was 27 years. For every 100 females, there were 90.7 males. For every 100 females aged 18 and over, there were 87.5 males.

The median income for a household in the town was $37,723, and the median income for a family was $46,691. Males had a median income of $32,645 versus $25,994 for females. The per capita income for the town was $17,926. About 5.3% of families and 9.6% of the population were below the poverty line, including 8.2% of those under age 18 and 6.1% of those aged 65 or over.

== Arts and culture ==
=== Points of interest ===
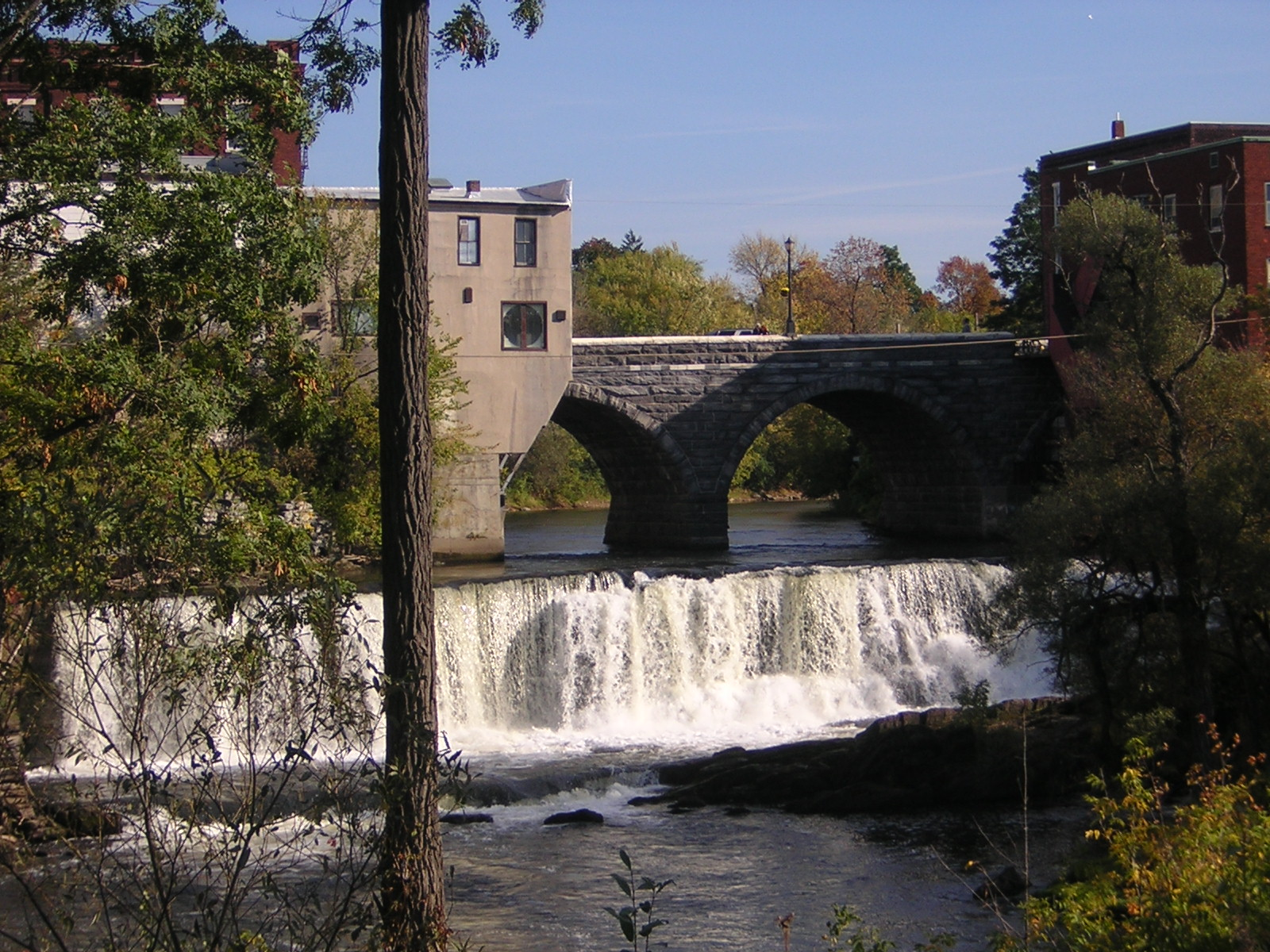
Falls on Otter Creek

- Emma Willard Memorial
- Henry Sheldon Museum of Vermont History
- Ilsley Public Library
- Middlebury to Her Soldiers (sculpture)
- TAM – Trail Around Middlebury

== Education ==
=== Public ===
Middlebury College campus

- Mary Hogan Elementary, grades Pre-K–5
- Middlebury Union Middle School, grades 6–8
- Middlebury Union High School, grades 9–12
- P.A. Hannaford Career Center regional technical center serving grades 9–12 and adults

=== Private ===
- The Aurora School (Pre-K only)
- Bridge School (elementary)
- St. Mary's Catholic Elementary School – closed 2016
- The Gailer School – closed 2012

=== Higher education ===
- Community College of Vermont – Middlebury campus
- Middlebury College

== Infrastructure ==
=== Medical care ===
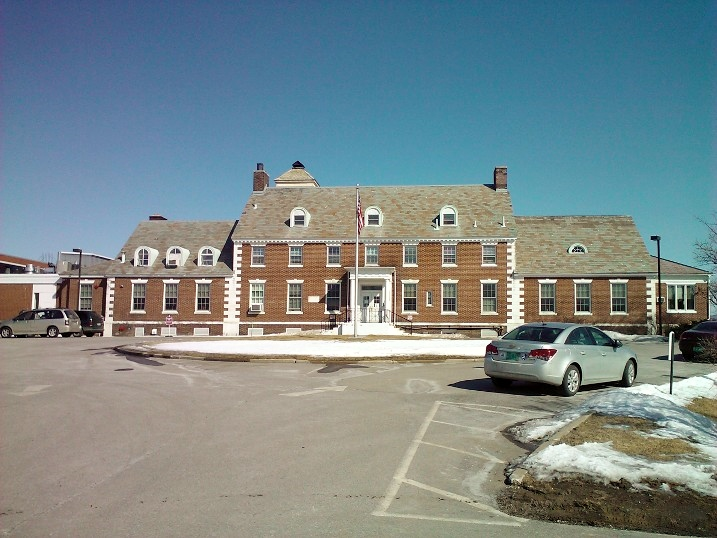
Porter Medical Center

Middlebury and the surrounding area are served by Porter Medical Center.

=== Transportation ===
==== Air ====
Middlebury State Airport, located east of the town, is for private aviation.

==== Bus ====
Bus service is provided by Tri-Valley Transit. Premier Coach provides an intercity bus line in a joint venture effort with Greyhound via Vermont Translines.

==== Highway ====
- U.S. Route 7 is the primary north/south highway through the town. It is known as Court Street south of the village, and North Pleasant Street north of the village.
- Vermont Route 23 is a north/south highway known as Weybridge Street and is located on the west side of town, crossing the college campus.
- Vermont Route 30 is a north/south highway entering the town on the south town line with Cornwall and ends at Route 7. It is known as Main Street within the town.
- Vermont Route 116 is a north/south highway located on the east side of town, ending near the East Middlebury village at Route 7. It is known as Case Street in Middlebury except for a short portion known as Ossie Road within the East Middlebury village.
- Vermont Route 125 is an east/west highway entering the town on the west side through Middlebury College where it is known as College Street. East of Route 7, Route 125 is known as East Main Street up until it exits the town at the Ripton town line.

==== Rail ====
Amtrak's Ethan Allen Express serves the town's station, connecting it to Burlington to the north and New York City to the south. Service began in the town in July 2022.

Until 1953, the Rutland Railroad ran passenger service on the Green Mountain Flyer (New York City - Montreal) and the overnight Mount Royal, making stops in the city.

== Notable people ==
- Julia Alvarez, author
- Robert B. Bates, Speaker of the Vermont House of Representatives
- Joseph Battell, publisher and philanthropist
- Ricardo Chávez Castañeda, author
- François Clemmons, actor and teacher
- Thomas Treadwell Davis, U.S. congressman
- Lea Davison, professional mountain biker and two-time olympian
- John Deere, inventor and manufacturer
- James Rood Doolittle, U.S. senator from Wisconsin
- Joel Doolittle, Justice of the Vermont Supreme Court, born in Russell
- Jim Douglas, 80th governor of Vermont
- Ray Fisher, professional baseball pitcher and college coach
- Robert Frost (1874–1963), poet
- Charles G. Haines, Adjutant General of New York
- Ruth Hardy, member of the Vermont Senate
- Peter J. Hincks, Vermont State Treasurer
- Ronald D. Liebowitz, former president of Middlebury College
- Charles Linsley, Vermont attorney and politician
- Gabriel Mann, actor and former model
- Samuel Mattocks, Vermont State Treasurer and father of Governor John Mattocks
- John M. McCardell, Jr., president emeritus and professor at Middlebury College
- Bill McKibben, author and environmentalist
- James Meacham, U.S. congressman
- Gamaliel Painter, local politician and town leader
- Edward John Phelps, lawyer and diplomat
- Samuel S. Phelps, U.S. senator
- William H. Porter, banker
- Steven C. Rockefeller, religion professor and son of Nelson Aldrich Rockefeller
- Patricia Ross, cross country skier
- Jarrod Sammis, Vermont state representative
- Horatio Seymour, U.S. senator
- Patty Sheehan, golfer
- William Slade, U.S. congressman and 17th governor of Vermont
- David Allen Smalley, judge
- John Wolcott Stewart, U.S. senator and congressman
- Allen R. Sturtevant, Associate Justice of the Vermont Supreme Court
- Charles M. Swift, lawyer, businessman, founder of Meralco and several railroads
- John P. Townsend, financier of the Gilded Age
- Arthur Trudeau, Army general and Ufologist
- Steve Vaillancourt, New Hampshire state legislator
- James M. Warner, manufacturer and general
- Emma Willard, women's rights advocate and school founder
- John Willard, U.S. Marshal for Vermont, husband of Emma Willard
- Isaac Wilson, U.S. congressman

== In popular culture ==
- G. Stone Motors, a new and used car dealership in Middlebury, was the subject of Game Show Network's television series Family Trade in 2013.
