= Westminster Catechism =

Westminster Catechism may refer to:

- Westminster Shorter Catechism
- Westminster Larger Catechism
