= William Channing Woodbridge =

American geographer and education reformer

- Born: December 8, 1794; Medford, Massachusetts, U.S.
- Died: November 9, 1845 (aged 50); Boston, Massachusetts, U.S.
- Resting place: Marblehead, Massachusetts, U.S.
- Education: Yale University; Princeton University
- Occupations: Geographer; educational reformer; author
- Spouse: Lucy Ann Reed (m. 1832)
- Children: 2
- Parent(s): William Woodbridge; Ann Channing

William Channing Woodbridge (December 8, 1794 – November 9, 1845) was an American geographer, educational reformer, and the author of many geography textbooks.

== Early life and family ==
Woodbridge's father, William Woodbridge, was a Yale University graduate, minister, and a major advocate for educational change in Connecticut. The senior Woodbridge wrote textbooks on grammar and spelling, and was the first preceptor of Phillips Exeter Academy. He worked with his son on some of the younger Woodbridge's projects. His mother was Ann Channing, the aunt of Bostonian Unitarian theologian William Ellery Channing.

William Channing Woodbridge was born in Medford, Massachusetts. His family soon moved to Connecticut, where his parents taught him Latin, Greek, Chemistry and Mathematics. Throughout his life, he suffered from what was then called scrofula, which today would probably be diagnosed as tuberculosis.

== Career at Yale ==
In June 1808, Woodbridge entered Yale as the youngest member of his freshman class. Here, he was inspired by Yale College's president, Timothy Dwight IV. Woodbridge developed an interest in both the American landscape and in the publication of geographies, and was a member of the Society of Brothers in Unity. Many of the values later reflected in his publications were those of Yale at this time. Woodbridge was a true son of the Enlightenment, believing in the importance of reason and observation. However, like Dwight he remained a committed evangelical Christian. Woodbridge rejected the Unitarian ideas which were then influencing so many of his friends and relatives. He believed passionately in science, but he was certain that this knowledge of the material world could only lead people closer to God and to a firmer morality. He believed in the essential unity of all humans. After discussing the location of the various races of mankind, his 1830 edition of Rudiments of Geography reminds readers, "The scriptures inform us that all of these races are brethren of the same family; the children of the same first parents."

== Teaching the deaf ==
Upon graduation, Woodbridge briefly attended Princeton University with the hope of studying theology and becoming a missionary. When ill health made this impossible, he turned to teaching. Eventually, he accepted a position as an instructor with Thomas Hopkins Gallaudet at the Asylum for the Deaf and Dumb in Hartford, Connecticut. Here, he pioneered in teaching geography to the disabled. Woodbridge also began work on a small geography text which would eventually be published as Rudiments of Geography.

== Travel to Europe ==
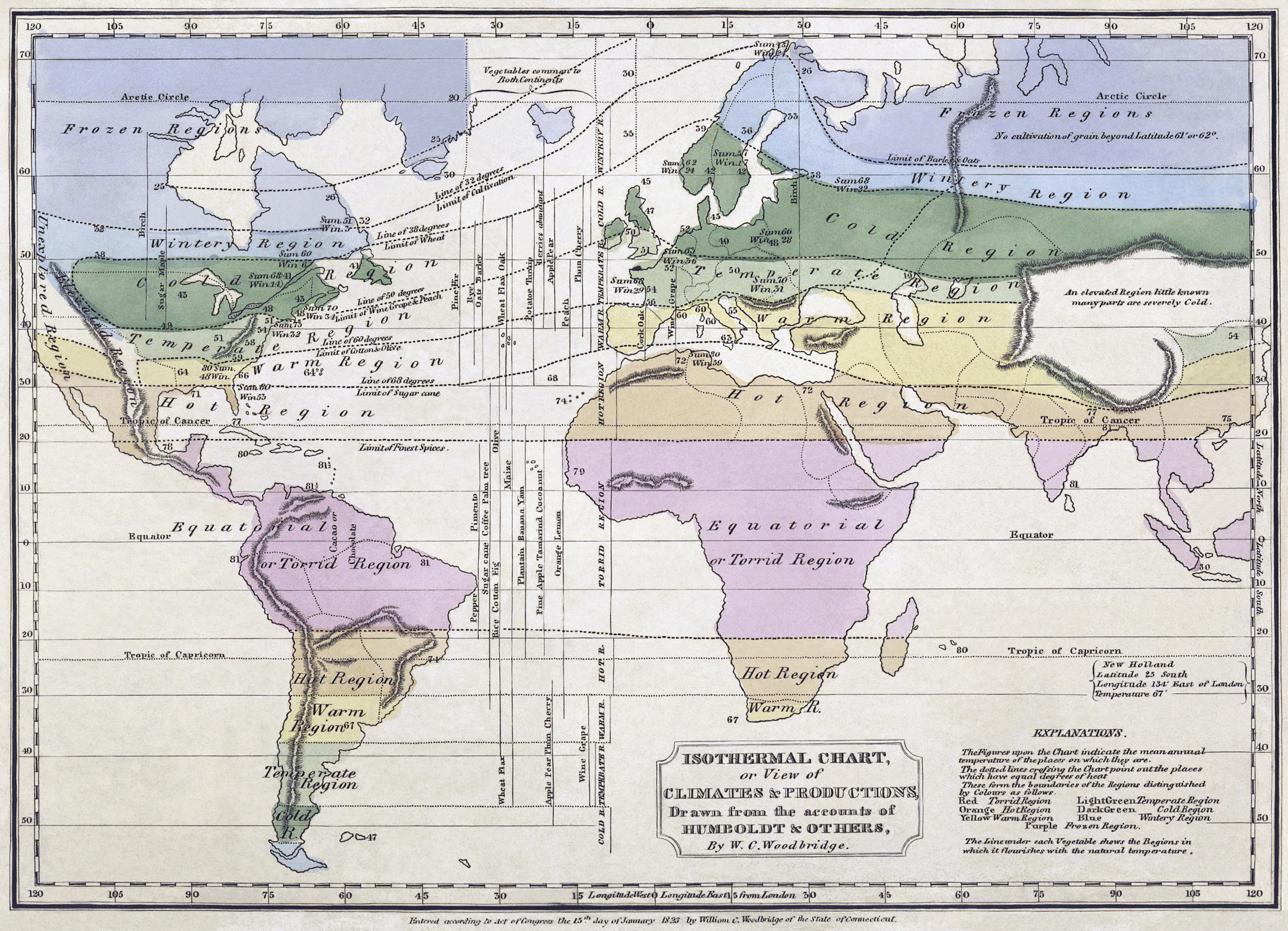
Isothermal chart of the world created in 1823 by Woodbridge using the work of Alexander von Humboldt.

In October 1820, Woodbridge left his teaching job and traveled to Europe. He was desperate to improve his health and keen to meet prominent European educators and visit their schools. He also wanted to gather material for an expanded geography. He traveled via Gibraltar and Algeciras to Palermo, Livorno, and Rome. He returned to Hartford in July 1821, where he began writing a new and greatly expanded geography that would incorporate what he had learned in Europe. It was eventually published 1824 as A System of Universal Geography. The book would remain in print, with small variations in title, until 1866.

== Second trip to Europe ==
For Woodbridge, understanding European thinkers was critical to improving American education. In the fall of 1824, he left the United States for a second and more extended trip across the Atlantic. The small amount of money he earned from books was insufficient to support even his very humble lifestyle. Therefore, he supplemented his earnings by teaching the disabled. For all of his admiration of European educators and geographers, he decided they were behind the United States in two areas: female education and teaching the disabled. Woodbridge spent the summer of 1826 teaching in Hofwil, Switzerland, where Philipp Emanuel von Fellenberg had established an influential experimental school. Woodbridge was in Paris in January 1827, correcting proofs of his new geography textbook. He had made the acquaintance of the great German explorer, scholar, and student of physical geography Alexander von Humboldt. Woodbridge continued to correspond with von Humboldt and incorporated many of von Humboldt's ideas in his geographies. In the introduction to his new geography text he thanked von Humboldt and the Geographical Society of Paris for their assistance. Woodbridge then went back to Hofwyl, probably sometime in 1828, before returning to New England in 1829.

== Work to improve music education ==
While on his second trip to Europe, Woodbridge observed the teaching of vocal music by Nägeli, Pfeiffer, Kübler and others, and brought home many of their works with him. Upon his return to Hartford, he began working with Elam Ives, Jr. to see those Pestalozzian-based teaching methods applied. Their experiment was apparently successful. During this same time, Woodbridge had gone to Boston and met Lowell Mason, whom he persuaded to go and observe Ives' experiments in Hartford.

Woodbridge left Hartford in 1830 and discontinued his relationship with Ives. Instead, he supported Mason (who—at least initially—adopted many of his imported methods) through the Boston Academy of Music, of which he was the corresponding secretary. His promotion of Mason through lectures in Boston and through his American Annals of Education eventually helped Mason win support to introduce music education into the Boston public schools, a feat which William Alcott would say was "a service which alone would have made him a public benefactor."

== Work with William A. Alcott ==
It was in Hartford, in the spring of 1830, that Woodbridge met William A. Alcott. Alcott would later remember the meeting, writing that he had entered a tavern, just as Woodbridge was leaving. He asked the publican who that was and was told that it was William Channing Woodbridge, who was a great friend of education. Alcott followed Woodbridge down the street and introduced himself. He was astonished when Woodbridge responded to the introduction with a question; "what is the great practical error in all of our school education?" Without hesitation, Alcott replied that it was,"the strange effort to crowd the intellect at the expense of health, morals, and everything else." These words, Alcott wrote, "bound as friends for life." By 1831, Woodbridge had shifted his base of operations from Hartford to Boston. The first joint effort of Woodbridge and Alcott was the publication of an improved educational journal. In 1831, Woodbridge purchased the American Journal of Education, which was renamed the Annals of Education. Over the next five years Alcott and Woodbridge contributed many articles and textbook reviews to the Annals. Woodbridge and Alcott filled the Annals with a wide range of articles on educational topics, reflected on developments in Europe, and pressed for educational reform. They were particularly concerned with women's education and with incorporating the ideas of Johann Heinrich Pestalozzi and the French reformer Joseph Jocotot into American schools, both of whom had stressed the importance of observation and of geography. By the time hard times swept away their control of the Annals in 1836, its reputation as the leading American educational publication was firmly established.

== Publication with Emma Willard ==
For some time Woodbridge had also been associated with Emma Willard. Together they worked on many geography texts. Their complex publication efforts had begun in the early 1820s. When both were growing up, their families lived within five miles of each other in Connecticut. Both shared a passionate interest in causes like educational reform and the education of women. Because it had originally been intended to publish Woodbridge's Rudiments of Geography with an early geography by Willard, and because Willard's Ancient Geography was eventually published with Woodbridge's work as Universal Geography, there was considerable confusion about the role of each author. Emma Willard had to publicly assure readers that the "system of modern geography" had been entirely written and arranged by Woodbridge. Their various combined geographies proved to be very successful. By 1827, they had reached an arrangement to pool and split royalties; Woodbridge would get five sevenths of the money and Willard would receive two sevenths. This seems to have reflected their relative contributions. Woodbridge seems to have done most of the updating as well as handling many of the financial arrangements with the publishers. Throughout Woodbridge's life the two authors remained on cordial terms. Kim Tolley has recently argued that the Woodbridge and Willard geographies, with their strong emphasis on field work and observation, were important in encouraging American women to develop an interest in science and Daniel H. Calhoun has made the case for their importance in the world view of Americans in the Jacksonian era.

== Publication of On the Best Methods of Teaching Geography ==
In 1834 Woodbridge presented and later published "On the Best Methods of Teaching Geography." This is almost certainly the first extended discussion geographic education written by an American. The need for such an effort reflected the growing importance of geography in American schools. In his essay, Woodbridge argued that simple memorization of names was insufficient; each word had to be supported in the student's mind by a clearly defined concept. The active use of maps was essential because those being taught had to see places in relation to each other. He felt that the small amount of knowledge that could be acquired in a classroom was not of much practical use to travelers, explorers, soldiers or missionaries; the real importance of geography was to lead the students outside his own limited experience and to learn to see themselves as part of a larger human family. The well-taught student of geography, he argued, should learn to wonder without condemning and to smile at some new experience without contempt.

== Legacy in authorship ==
By modern standards, Woodbridge's books are small. Rudiments of geography, one of the smallest, was only six by three and a half inches (15.2 by 8.9 cm). The same illustrations were often used in several different books, as they were expensive to create. In content, Woodbridge's geographies stress several common points. He saw physical geography as more important than human, simply because it was less likely to change. He introduced many European ideas about the planet to American audiences. In his discussions of the human condition in various regions, Woodbridge emphasised that the human condition in any part of the globe is primarily the product of access to education and opportunity. Climate, religion, and the nature of governments played some role, but he had no place for the racial slurs that were to disfigure so many American textbooks of the second half of the nineteenth century. He regarded the way in which societies treated and educated women as a useful measure of their degree of enlightenment. His geographies, like almost all of the schools they were intended for, were overtly Christian, but could never be mistaken for religious tracts.

Maps were Woodbridge's passion. Often his text would begin with the student's home or classroom and work outwards to the wider world. He was a member of the Geographical societies of Paris, Frankfurt and Berlin, scanning their pages for new information. Geoffery Martin has called Woodbridge, "one of the most reliable mapmakers of his time." This is ironic because some modern readers are struck by the relatively few number of maps in some of his works; this is often because many were bound and sold together with a small atlas. These atlases, which usually command higher value in the antique market than the texts, have often been separated from their original companions.

== Personal life ==
In 1832 Woodbridge married Lucy Ann Reed, who had been Catharine Beecher's associate principal at the Hartford Female Seminary and then an assistant teacher in Marblehead, Massachusetts. He actively campaigned for improvement in the Common schools of Massachusetts. He became a leader in the "Society for the Relief and Improvement of the African Race." Throughout the 1830s and early 1840s he continued to expand, update, and revise his textbooks. In particular, over time, there is a noticeable improvement in the number and quality of maps and illustrations. In addition to constant sickness, Woodbridge spent most of his life in near poverty. Income from one book was often used to improve the next and he was unable to resist an appeal from anyone in need. In search of improved health and for new information for his geographies, Woodbridge returned to Europe in 1836. His young wife eventually joined him there, but died in Frankfurt in 1840, leaving Woodbridge with the care of their two small children. He traveled to Berlin for the winter of 1841-1842 and then returned to Boston. His health continued to deteriorate, and hoping that a more tropical climate would relieve his symptoms, he spent the last three winters of his life in St. Croix, in what was then Danish Territory, but is now part of the United States Virgin Islands. An illustration the 1847 edition of his Modern School Geography shows Woodbridge working in his study there with a map on the wall and a shelf of books (p. ix). William Channing Woodbridge died in Boston in 1845 and is buried in Marblehead, Massachusetts.

== List of works ==
A System of Universal Geography: On the Principles of Comparison and Classification, 1824 (with Emma Willard)

Rudiments of Geography, 1822

Ancient Geography, as Connected with Chronology, and Preparatory to a Study of Ancient History, 1823 (with Emma Willard)

Modern School Geography, 1845
