= 82nd New York State Legislature =

New York state legislative session

←	81st	83rd	→
- The Old State Capitol (1879)

Overview
- Legislative body: New York State Legislature
- Jurisdiction: New York, United States
- Term: January 1 – December 31, 1859

Senate
- Members: 32
- President: Lt. Gov. Robert Campbell (R)
- Temporary President: William A. Wheeler (R), from January 18
- Party control: Republican (17-13-2)

Assembly
- Members: 128
- Speaker: DeWitt C. Littlejohn (R)
- Party control: Republican (91-29-8)

Sessions
- 1st: January 4 – April 19, 1859

Old State Capitol building in Albany, New York. Home of the State Government from 1812 to 1878.

The 82nd New York State Legislature, consisting of the New York State Senate and the New York State Assembly, met from January 4 to April 19, 1859, during the first year of Edwin D. Morgan's governorship, in Albany.

== Background ==
Under the provisions of the New York Constitution of 1846, 32 Senators and 128 assemblymen were elected in single-seat districts; senators for a two-year term, assemblymen for a one-year term. The senatorial districts were made up of entire counties, except New York County (four districts) and Kings County (two districts). The Assembly districts were made up of entire towns, or city wards, forming a contiguous area, all within the same county.

At this time there were two major political parties: the Democratic Party and the Republican Party. The Know Nothing movement ran in the election as the "American Party."

== Elections ==
The 1858 New York state election was held on November 2. Republicans Edwin D. Morgan and Robert Campbell were elected Governor and Lieutenant Governor. The other two statewide elective offices were also carried by the Republicans. The approximate party strength at this election, as expressed by the vote for Governor was: Republican 248,000; Democratic 230,000; and American 61,000.

== Sessions ==
The Legislature met for the regular session at the Old State Capitol in Albany on January 4, 1859; and adjourned on April 19.

DeWitt C. Littlejohn (R) was again elected Speaker with 90 votes against 28 for John W. Chanler (D) and 6 for Chauncey Boughton (A).

On January 18, William A. Wheeler (R) was elected president pro tempore of the State Senate.

== State Senate ==
=== Districts ===
- 1st District: Queens, Richmond and Suffolk counties
- 2nd District: 1st, 2nd, 3rd, 4th, 5th, 7th, 11th, 13th and 19th wards of the City of Brooklyn
- 3rd District: 6th, 8th, 9th, 10th, 12th, 14th, 15th, 16th, 17th and 18th wards of the City of Brookland; and all towns in Kings County
- 4th District: 1st, 2nd, 3rd, 4th, 5th, 6th, 7th, 8th and 14th wards of New York City
- 5th District: 10th, 11th, 13th and 17th wards of New York City
- 6th District: 9th, 15th, 16th and 18th wards of New York City
- 7th District: 12th, 19th, 20th, 21st and 22nd wards of New York City
- 8th District: Putnam, Rockland and Westchester counties
- 9th District: Orange and Sullivan counties
- 10th District: Greene and Ulster counties
- 11th District: Columbia and Dutchess counties
- 12th District: Rensselaer and Washington counties
- 13th District: Albany County
- 14th District: Delaware, Schenectady and Schoharie counties
- 15th District: Fulton, Hamilton, Montgomery and Saratoga counties
- 16th District: Clinton, Essex and Warren counties
- 17th District: Franklin and St. Lawrence counties
- 18th District: Jefferson and Lewis counties
- 19th District: Oneida County
- 20th District: Herkimer and Otsego counties
- 21st District: Oswego County
- 22nd District: Onondaga County
- 23rd District: Chenango, Cortland and Madison counties
- 24th District: Broome, Tompkins and Tioga counties
- 25th District: Cayuga and Wayne counties
- 26th District: Ontario, Seneca and Yates counties
- 27th District: Chemung, Schuyler and Steuben counties
- 28th District: Monroe County
- 29th District: Genesee, Niagara and Orleans counties
- 30th District: Allegany, Livingston and Wyoming counties
- 31st District: Erie County
- 32nd District: Cattaraugus and Chautauqua counties
Note: There are now 62 counties in the State of New York. The counties which are not mentioned in this list had not yet been established, or sufficiently organized, the area being included in one or more of the abovementioned counties.

=== Members ===
The asterisk (*) denotes members of the previous Legislature who continued in office as members of this Legislature.

District	Senator	Party	Notes
1st	Joshua B. Smith*	Democrat	
2nd	Samuel Sloan*	Democrat	
3rd	Francis B. Spinola*	Democrat	
4th	John C. Mather*	Democrat	
5th	Smith Ely, Jr.*	Democrat	
6th	Richard Schell*	Democrat	
7th	John Doherty*	Democrat	died on April 20, 1859
8th	Benjamin Brandreth*	Democrat	
9th	Osmer B. Wheeler*	American	
10th	George W. Pratt*	Democrat	
11th	William G. Mandeville*	Democrat	contested; seat declared vacant on March 16
11th	Henry C. Wetmore	American	seated on April 5
12th	John D. Willard*	Democrat	
13th	George Y. Johnson*	American	
14th	Edward I. Burhans*	Democrat	
15th	George G. Scott*	Democrat	
16th	Ralph A. Loveland*	Republican	
17th	William A. Wheeler*	Republican	on January 18, elected president pro tempore
18th	Joseph A. Willard*	Republican	
19th	Alrick Hubbell*	Republican	
20th	Addison H. Laflin*	Republican	
21st	Cheney Ames*	Republican	
22nd	James Noxon*	Republican	
23rd	John J. Foote*	Republican	
24th	Lyman Truman*	Republican	
25th	Alexander B. Williams*	Republican	
26th	Truman Boardman*	Republican	
27th	Alexander S. Diven*	Republican	
28th	John E. Paterson*	Republican	
29th	Horatio J. Stow*	Independent	did not take his seat during this session; died on February 19, 1859
29th	George D. Lamont	Republican	elected to fill vacancy; seated on March 21
30th	John B. Halsted*	Republican	
31st	Erastus S. Prosser	Republican	elected to fill vacancy, in place of James Wadsworth
32nd	John P. Darling*	Republican	

=== Employees ===
- Clerk: Samuel P. Allen
- Deputy Clerk: Henry J. Sickles
- Sergeant-at-Arms: Henry W. Dwight
- Assistant Sergeant-at-Arms: Simeon Dillingham
- Doorkeeper: Richard U. Owens
- First Assistant Doorkeeper: Henry W. Shipman
- Second Assistant Doorkeeper: Samuel Ten Eyck
- Third Assistant Doorkeeper: James P. Clark
- Journal Clerk: James Terwilliger
- Engrossing Clerks: A. N. Cole, Charles G. Fairman

== State Assembly ==
=== Assemblymen ===
The asterisk (*) denotes members of the previous Legislature who continued as members of this Legislature.

Party affiliations follow the vote for Speaker.

District		Assemblymen	Party	Notes
Albany	1st	Henry Creble	Democrat	
Albany	2nd	Morgan L. Filkins	American	
Albany	3rd	William A. Young	Democrat	
Albany	4th	Lorenzo D. Collins	Republican	
Allegany	1st	Alfred Lockhart	Republican	
Allegany	2nd	Wiliam Cobb	Republican	
Broome		Osborne E. Bump	Republican	
Cattaraugus	1st	Marsena Baker	Republican	died on March 4
Cattaraugus	2nd	William Buffington Jr.*	Republican	
Cayuga	1st	William W. Payne	Republican	
Cayuga	2nd	Chauncey M. Abbott*	Republican	
Chautauqua	1st	Henry Bliss*	Republican	
Chautauqua	2nd	Sidney E. Palmer	Republican	
Chemung		Peter Wintermute	Republican	
Chenango	1st	Grant B. Palmer	Democrat	
Chenango	2nd	Judson L. Grant	Republican	
Clinton		Lewis W. Pierce	Republican	
Columbia	1st	Henry P. Heermance	Democrat	
Columbia	2nd	James G. Van Volkenburgh	Republican	
Cortland		Arthur Holmes	Republican	
Delaware	1st	Barna R. Johnson	Republican	
Delaware	2nd	Samuel A. Law*	American	
Dutchess	1st	James Mackin	Republican	
Dutchess	2nd	Samuel J. Farnum	Republican	
Erie	1st	Daniel Bowen	Republican	
Erie	2nd	Henry B. Miller	Republican	
Erie	3rd	John S. King	American	
Erie	4th	Wilson Rogers	Republican	
Essex		Monroe Hall*	Republican	
Franklin		Martin L. Parlin	Republican	
Fulton and Hamilton		Henry W. Spencer	American	
Genesee		Elbridge G. Moulton	Republican	
Greene		Augustus R. Macomber	Democrat	
Herkimer	1st	Solomon Graves	Republican	
Herkimer	2nd	Lester Green	Republican	
Jefferson	1st	Russell Weaver	Republican	
Jefferson	2nd	Patrick S. Stewart	Republican	
Jefferson	3rd	Furman Fish	Republican	
Kings	1st	Joseph Wilson	Democrat	
Kings	2nd	Marcus D. Moore	Republican	
Kings	3rd	Harmanus B. Duryea*	Republican	
Kings	4th	Thomas A. Gardiner	Democrat	
Kings	5th	Lucius C. Andrus	Republican	
Kings	6th	Abraham Meserole Jr.	Republican	
Kings	7th	Franklin Tuthill	Republican	previously a member from Suffolk Co.
Lewis		Lyman R. Lyon	Republican	
Livingston	1st	Samuel L. Fuller	Republican	
Livingston	2nd	John Wiley	Republican	
Madison	1st	Simeon Rider	Republican	
Madison	2nd	Noah M. Coburn	Republican	
Monroe	1st	Harrison A. Lyon	Republican	
Monroe	2nd	Elias Pond	Republican	
Monroe	3rd	Alphonso Perry	Republican	
Montgomery		Jeremiah Snell	American	
New York	1st	Jacob L. Smith*	Democrat	
New York	2nd	Michael Fitzgerald*	Democrat	
New York	3rd	Christian B. Woodruff	Democrat	
New York	4th	William Gover	Democrat	
New York	5th	John J. Shaw	Republican	
New York	6th	George A. Jeremiah*	Democrat	
New York	7th	Frederick A. Conkling	Republican	
New York	8th	James J. Reilly	Democrat	
New York	9th	Charles S. Spencer	Republican	
New York	10th	John W. Chanler*	Democrat	
New York	11th	Noah D. Childs*	Democrat	
New York	12th	Theodore E. Tomlinson	Democrat	
New York	13th	Peter Masterson	Democrat	
New York	14th	George Opdyke	Republican	
New York	15th	Stephen S. Childs	Republican	
New York	16th	James C. Rutherford	Democrat	
New York	17th	James McLeod	Democrat	
Niagara	1st	James Sweeney	Republican	
Niagara	2nd	Burt Van Horn*	Republican	
Oneida	1st	Charles M. Scholefield	Republican	
Oneida	2nd	Edward Loomis	Republican	
Oneida	3rd	Patrick C. Costello	Republican	
Oneida	4th	Didymus Thomas	Republican	
Onondaga	1st	Luke Ranney	Republican	
Onondaga	2nd	Henry W. Slocum	Republican	
Onondaga	3rd	Orin Aylworth	Republican	
Ontario	1st	Ulysses Warner	Democrat	
Ontario	2nd	Shotwell Powell	Republican	
Orange	1st	James H. Mallery	Democrat	
Orange	2nd	Joseph Davis	Republican	
Orleans		Almanzor Hutchinson*	Republican	
Oswego	1st	DeWitt C. Littlejohn	Republican	elected Speaker
Oswego	2nd	James J. Coit	Republican	
Oswego	3rd	Beman Brockway	Republican	
Otsego	1st	George F. Longenhelt	Republican	
Otsego	2nd	David B. St. John	Republican	
Putnam		Edwin A. Pelton	Republican	
Queens	1st	Edward A. Lawrence*	Democrat	
Queens	2nd	Robert L. Meeks	Republican	
Rensselaer	1st	Thomas Coleman	American	
Rensselaer	2nd	Henry B. Clark	Republican	
Rensselaer	3rd	Anson Bingham	Republican	
Richmond		Robert Christie Jr.	Democrat	
Rockland		Wesley J. Weiant*	Democrat	
St. Lawrence	1st	Harlow Godard*	Republican	
St. Lawrence	2nd	William Briggs*	Republican	
St. Lawrence	3rd	Oscar F. Shepard*	Republican	
Saratoga	1st	Chauncey Boughton*	American	
Saratoga	2nd	George S. Batcheller	Republican	
Schenectady		Charles Thomas	Republican	
Schoharie		William C. Lamont	Democrat	
Schuyler		Isaac D. Mekeel	Republican	
Seneca		Jacob P. Chamberlain	Republican	
Steuben	1st	Abel Eveland	Republican	
Steuben	2nd	Wickham R. Crocker	Republican	
Steuben	3rd	John T. Plato	Republican	
Suffolk	1st	Benjamin F. Wiggins	Republican	
Suffolk	2nd	Richard J. Cornelius	Democrat	
Sullivan		Gideon E. Bushnell	Democrat	
Tioga		David Earll	Republican	
Tompkins		William Woodbury	Republican	
Ulster	1st	Edmund Suydam	Democrat	
Ulster	2nd	Albert Carpenter	American	
Ulster	3rd	Abraham D. Ladew	Republican	
Warren		Elisha Pendell	Republican	
Washington	1st	Andrew Thompson	Republican	
Washington	2nd	James M. Northup	Republican	
Wayne	1st	Henry K. Graves	Republican	
Wayne	2nd	John A. Laing	Republican	
Westchester	1st	Augustus Van Cortlandt	Democrat	
Westchester	2nd	James S. See	Republican	
Westchester	3rd	Gaylord B. Hubbell	Republican	
Wyoming		Elias C. Holt	Republican	
Yates		Daniel Morris	Republican	

=== Employees ===
- Clerk: William Richardson
- Sergeant-at-Arms: Daniel M. Prescott
- Doorkeeper: George C. Dennis
- First Assistant Doorkeeper:
- Second Assistant Doorkeeper:

== Sources ==
- The New York Civil List compiled by Franklin Benjamin Hough, Stephen C. Hutchins and Edgar Albert Werner (1867; see pg. 439 for Senate districts; pg. 442 for senators; pg. 450–462 for Assembly districts; and pg. 487ff for assemblymen)
- Journal of the Senate (82nd Session) (1859)
- Journal of the Assembly (82nd Session) (1859)
- Biographical Sketches of the State Officers and Members of the Legislature of the State of New York in 1859 by William D. Murphy
