= James M. Northup =

American politician (1820–1899)

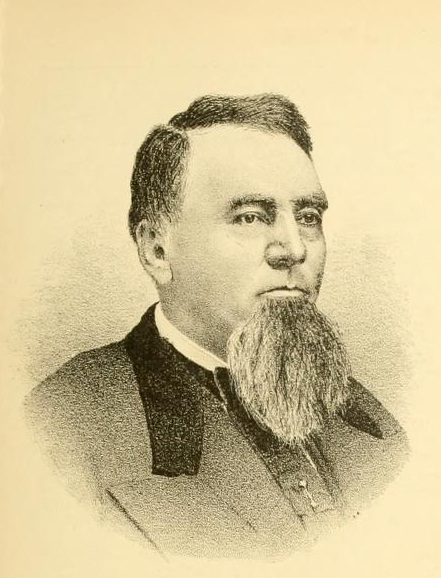
James M. Northup (1878)

James M. Northup (October 8, 1820 – October 20, 1899) was an American farmer, merchant, banker and politician from New York.

== Life ==
He was born on October 8, 1820, in Plattsburgh, Clinton County, New York, the son of John S. Northup (1792–1863) and Laura (Baker) Northup (1799–1872). At age 15, he began to work as a farm-hand. On January 4, 1842, he married Julia A. Davis (died 1850), and they had two children. He took charge of the farm owned by his wife's parents, located in the Town of Hartford. At the same time he engaged in the wholesale produce business, especially dealing in potatoes, and eventually became known as the "Potato King". On May 13, 1851, he married Martha Dunham (1827–1867), and they had two daughters.

Northup was Supervisor of the Town of Hartford in 1856 and 1857. He was a Republican member of the New York State Assembly (Washington Co., 2nd D.) in 1859.

On February 8, 1871, he married Harriet D. Sill (1835–1899), and they had two sons. Northup was Treasurer of Washington County from 1871 to 1878. Later he was President of the Fort Edward National Bank.

In 1884, he bought the Wing-Northup House, in Fort Edward, and his son H. Davis Northup went to live there in 1886.

James M. Northup died on October 20, 1899, at his home in Hartford.

== Sources ==
New York State Assembly
Preceded by Ralph Richards	New York State Assembly; Washington County, 2nd District; 1859	Succeeded by Pelatiah Jakway
