= Senator Wetmore (disambiguation) =

George P. Wetmore (1846–1921), was a U.S. Senator from Rhode Island from 1895 to 1907. Senator Wetmore may also refer to:

- Henry C. Wetmore (1823–1862), New York State Senate
- Robert D. Wetmore (1930–2016), Massachusetts State Senate
