= Sampson Battis =

African-American in Revolutionary War

Sampson Battis (about 1752 – 1847) was an African-American slave who fought in the American Revolution.

== Early life ==
Sampson was enslaved to Colonel Archelaus Moore, a farmer in Merrimack, New Hampshire, United States, who promised to free him if he would fight in the war. Battis agreed and Colonel Moore volunteered him to fill the local quota of men for the army.

== Military ==
Sampson enlisted in the company of Captain Benjamin Sias (who married Archelaus Moore's youngest child Abigail) and was at Fort Edward, New York at the time of General Borgoyne's invasion, being in the service at that time from October 4 to 26, 1777.

He was a volunteer for three months in Colonel Thomas Stickney's regiment. In the same year, he is on the muster roll of Captain Nathaniel Head's company. He enlisted for three months on August 20. November 20 he is recorded as a deserter. Since the company was actually discharged on November 25, Sampson may have anticipated his discharge.

Sampson Battis has a grave stone in the Moore section of the burial ground at Canterbury Center with the inscription "Sampson Battis, Head's Company, Reynold's New Hampshire, Rev. War."

== Marriage ==
Sampson married Lucy, a slave who belonged to William Coffin.

Bouton states (p. 252) "William Coffin, the grandfather of Samuel Coffin, Esq., owned a negro woman named 'Lucy.' 'Sampson,' a negro belonging to Archelaus Moore, of Canterbury, wanted her for his wife; and there was an agreement that Sampson should work for one year for Mr. Coffin to pay for her. A man's wages at that time were about forty dollars a year, or the price of a yoke of oxen. Sampson was a famous fiddler, and for many years afforded fine fun for frolicsome fellows in Concord with his fiddle on election days."

== Property ==
In 1802, John Moore, son of Colonel Archelaus, leased a lot in Canterbury between No. 51 and the Concord line to Sampson Battis for $1 for his natural life.

== Death ==
Sampson died on October 23, 1847, at about age 95 in Canterbury, Merrimack County, New Hampshire and is buried at Canterbury Village Cemetery (also known as Canterbury Center Cemetery).

== Bibliography ==
Lyford, J. O. (1912) History of the town of Canterbury, New Hampshire, −1912. Concord, N.H., Rumford. [Image] Retrieved from the Library of Congress, https://www.loc.gov/item/12024495/.

Moore, Howard Parker,. The descendants of Ensign John Moor of Canterbury, N.H., : born 1696-died 1786. Rutland, Vt.: Tuttle Co., 1918.

"The History of Concord, From Its First Grant in 1725 – To the Organization of the City Government In 1853, With a History of the Ancient Penacooks" By Nathaniel Bouton. Published in Concord by Benning W. Sanborn, 1856.
