= Frederick H. Hastings =

American lawyer, manufacturer, and politician from New York

Frederick Herring Hastings (December 2, 1818 – October 15, 1869) was an American lawyer, manufacturer, and politician from New York.

== Biography ==
Hastings was born on December 2, 1818 in Albany, New York.

Hastings graduated from Williams College in 1838, after which he practiced law in Albany. In 1848, circumstances compelled him to leave the profession and he became a manufacturer of cotton goods in Brainard.

In 1863, Hastings was elected to the New York State Senate as a Republican, representing New York's 12th State Senate district (Rensselaer and Washington counties). He served in the Senate in 1864 and 1865. During the last year of his term, his health began to fail him and he lost the renomination. He also served for a term or two as town supervisor of Nassau.

Hastings was an active member and elder of the Brainard Presbyterian Church. He was married three times: first to Frances F. Hosmer in 1842, then to Lavinia C. King in 1855, then to Loraine E. King in 1863.

Hastings died at home on October 15, 1869. He was buried in Albany Rural Cemetery in Menands.

New York State Senate
Preceded by Ralph Richards	New York State Senate; 12th District; 1864–1865	Succeeded by James Gibson
