= Joseph A. Willard =

American politician (1803–1868)

Member of the New York State Senate from the 18th district
- In office January 1, 1858 – December 31, 1859
- Preceded by: Addison Melvin Smith
- Succeeded by: James A. Bell

Personal details
- Born: Joseph Allen Willard; April 26, 1803 Hubbardton, Vermont, U.S.
- Died: August 18, 1868 (aged 65) Lowville, New York, U.S.
- Party: Republican
- Other political affiliations: Whig
- Relatives: Simon Willard
- Occupation: Politician

Joseph Allen Willard (April 26, 1803, in Hubbardton, Rutland County, Vermont – August 18, 1868, in Lowville, Lewis County, New York) was an American politician from New York.

== Life ==
He was the son of Francis Willard (c. 1777–1856), a carpenter. Joseph A. Willard became a clothier, and about 1824 set up shop in Lowville. On October 22, 1829, he married Eusebia Eager (1818–1887), and they had several children.

He entered politics as a Whig, was a delegate to the Anti-Nebraska Party state convention in 1854, and joined the Republican Party upon its foundation. He became a brigadier general of the State Militia, and was Supervisor of the Town of Lowville in 1856 and 1857.

Willard was a member of the New York State Senate (18th D.) in 1858 and 1859.

== Ancestry ==
Joseph Allen Willard was a 3rd great-grandson (6th generation descendant) of the Massachusetts colonist Simon Willard (1605–1676).

New York State Senate
Preceded by Addison Melvin Smith (Note: Adam Melvin Smith (1817–1868).)	New York State Senate; 18th District; 1858–1859	Succeeded by James A. Bell
