= John D. Willard =

American politician

John Dwight Willard (November 4, 1799 Lancaster, Coös County, New Hampshire – October 9, 1864 Troy, Rensselaer County, New York) was an American lawyer and politician from New York.

== Life ==
He was the son of Rev. Joseph Willard (1761–1827) and Olive (Haven) Willard (ca. 1760–1843). He graduated from Dartmouth College in 1819. Afterwards he spent two years in Savannah, Georgia, to improve his failing health. Then he studied law, was admitted to the bar in 1826, and commenced practice in Troy. In 1829, he married Laura Barnes, and they had two sons. In 1831, he succeeded Orville L. Holley as editor of the Troy Sentinel.

He was an associate judge of the Rensselaer County Court from 1834 to 1840.

He was a Freemason and served as Grand Master in the Grand Lodge of New York from 1846 to 1849.

He was a member of the New York State Senate (12th D.) in 1858 and 1859.

== Sources ==
- The New York Civil List compiled by Franklin Benjamin Hough, Stephen C. Hutchins and Edgar Albert Werner (1867; pg. 442)
- Biographical Sketches of the State Officers and Members of the Legislature of the State of New York in 1859 by William D. Murray (pg. 114ff)
- John D. Willard bio and portrait at RootsWeb

New York State Senate
Preceded by Amos Briggs	New York State Senate; 12th District; 1858–1859	Succeeded by Volney Richmond
