= Ralph Richards =

American politician

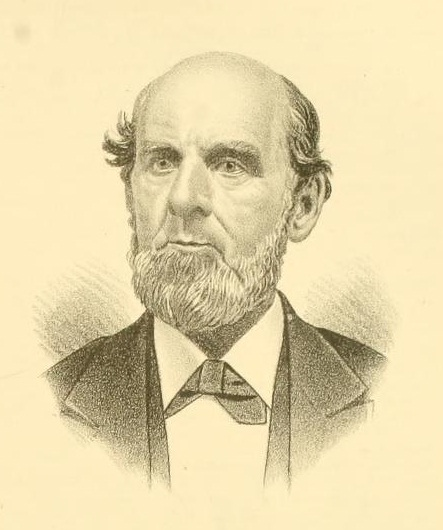
Ralph Richards (1878)

Ralph Richards (November 22, 1809 – February 23, 1883) was an American politician from New York.

== Life ==
He was born on November 22, 1809, in Weathersfield, Windsor County, Vermont, the son of Eli Richards (1778–1858) and Amanda Richards. In 1813, the family removed to Hampton, Washington County, New York. Ralph Richards became a school teacher. On April 23, 1838, he married Harriet Leland (1820–1847), and they had a daughter who died aged 7 years. On January 12, 1848, he married Mary Richardson (born 1820), and they had five children.

He was a member of the New York State Assembly (Washington Co., 2nd D.) in 1858; and of the New York State Senate (12th D.) in 1862 and 1863.

He died on February 23, 1883; and was buried at the Hampton Flats Cemetery in Hampton.

== Sources ==
- S. C. Hutchins (1870). Civil List and Forms of Government of the Colony State of New York. p. 443 and 488.
- William D. Murphy (1863). Biographical Sketches of the State Officers and Members of the Legislature of the State of New York, in 1862 and '63. Published by the author. p. 99.

New York State Assembly
Preceded by Henry W. Beckwith	New York State Assembly; Washington County, 2nd District; 1858	Succeeded by James M. Northup
New York State Senate
Preceded by Volney Richmond	New York State Senate; 11th District; 1862–1863	Succeeded by Frederick H. Hastings
