= Chauncey M. Abbott =

American politician

Chauncey Milton Abbott (c. 1822 – November 11, 1863) was an American politician from New York.

== Life ==
He was born in that part of the Town of Sempronius which was separated in 1833 as the Town of Niles, in Cayuga County, New York. In 1845, he married Adaline Oakley (1823–1907), and they had several children.

He was a member of the New York State Assembly (Cayuga Co., 2nd D.) in 1858 and 1859. He was a member of the New York State Senate (25th D.) in 1862 and 1863.

He died at his residence in Niles in 1863 and was buried in the town's Twelve Corners Cemetery.

== Sources ==
- The New York Civil List compiled by Franklin Benjamin Hough, Stephen C. Hutchins and Edgar Albert Werner (1870; pg. 443, 486 and 488)
- Biographical Sketches of the State Officers and the Members of the Legislature of the State of New York in 1862 and '63 by William D. Murphy (1863; pg. 40ff)
- The American Annual Cyclopedia and Register of Important Events of the Year 1863 (1868; pg. 721)

New York State Assembly
Preceded by Theodore M. Pomeroy	New York State Assembly; Cayuga County, 2nd District; 1858–1859	Succeeded by Allen D. Morgan
New York State Senate
Preceded by Alexander B. Williams	New York State Senate; 25th District; 1862–1863	Succeeded by Stephen K. Williams
