= Volney Richmond =

American politician

Volney Richmond (June 23, 1802 Hoosick, Rensselaer County, New York - February 27, 1864) was an American manufacturer and politician from New York.

== Life ==
He was the son of Edward Richmond (c. 1756–1827) and Olive (Briggs) Richmond. He became a wagon and carriage maker, and set up shop in Hoosick. Later he ran a hotel there until 1840 when he was elected Sheriff and removed to the county seat Troy. In 1828, he married Lucy Townsend (d. 1836). In 1838, he married Mary Barnett (b. 1815), and they had three children.

He was Sheriff of Rensselaer County, New York from 1841 to 1843, and Under-Sheriff from 1844 to 1846. In 1848, he established a stove foundry in Troy. In 1856, he returned to Hoosick and engaged in agricultural pursuits.

He was a member of the New York State Assembly (Rensselaer Co., 2nd D.) in 1857; and a member of the New York State Senate (12th D.) in 1860 and 1861.

== Sources ==
- The New York Civil List compiled by Franklin Benjamin Hough, Stephen C. Hutchins and Edgar Albert Werner (1867; pg. 369, 442 and 484)
- Biographical Sketches of the State Officers and Members of the Legislature of the State of New York by William D. Murphy (1861; pg. 105ff)
- Hyde Genealogy compiled by Reuben H. Walworth (1864; pg. 505f)

New York State Assembly
Preceded by Augustus Johnson	New York State Assembly; Rensselaer County, 2nd District; 1857	Succeeded by Daniel Fish
New York State Senate
Preceded by John D. Willard	New York State Senate; 12th District; 1860–1861	Succeeded by Ralph Richards
