= Rogers Island (New York) =

- U.S. National Register of Historic Places
- Location within New York Location within the United States
- Location: Fort Edward, New York
- Coordinates: 43°15′42″N 73°35′8″W
- Built: 1755
- NRHP reference No.: 73001283
- Added to NRHP: July 24, 1973

Rogers Island is an island on the Hudson River, in Washington County, New York, that once formed part of the third largest "city" in colonial North America, and is considered the "spiritual home" of the United States Special Operations Forces, particularly the United States Army Rangers.

== Geography ==
Rogers Island is located in the middle of the Hudson River, in the south-western area of Washington County, New York. It is a part of the Village of Fort Edward, which itself is part of the Town of Fort Edward, north of Albany and east of Syracuse.

== History ==
Archaeological discoveries on Rogers Island show Native American hunting and fishing activities dating back approximately to 4000 BC. Native Americans remained in the area until the arrival of Europeans in the 18th century. The archaeological site was listed on the National Register of Historic Places in 1973. The Royal Blockhouse site was listed on the National Register of Historic Places in 2012.

Due to its strategic location on the Hudson, Rogers Island and Fort Edward opposite became a fortress operated by the British Empire, involved in the French and Indian War (1754–1763) with invasions into French Canada to the north often beginning from the area. Due to the expansion required to house such large numbers of troops, estimated to be 16,000, Fort Edward and Rogers Island became the third largest community in North America, after New York City and Boston.

From 1756 to 1759, Rogers Island was used as a training ground for Major Robert Rogers, from which the island takes its name. Here, Rogers trained irregular fighting forces and composed his 28 ranging rules. Captain Israel Putnam was stationed on the island in 1756. The following February, he sustained injuries in putting out a fire in a row of barracks nearest the magazine, which kept Putnam out of active service for a month.

Fort Edward and Rogers Island were evacuated in 1766 and left to ruin during the American War of Independence, though it was briefly garrisoned until 1777.

Evidence found in seven unmarked graves unearthed on Rogers Island in 2006 suggest that the site contains a military cemetery from the time of the French and Indian War. The Island was also home to a British army smallpox hospital during the war, although some of the deaths could have resulted from wounds incurred in skirmishes with the French.

During the 1800s, the island was used to train militia for the American Civil War, with the northern tip being inhabited by civilians.

== Rogers Island Visitors Center ==
On July 6, 2001, the Rogers Island Visitors Center was opened on the island. Exhibits at the Visitors Center tell the story of the Fort Edward area, from the earliest Native Americans that lived here through the Revolutionary War. The Visitors Center also serves as the home base of operations for the Adirondack Community College Archeological Field School for six weeks each summer.

The Rogers Island Visitors Center hosts an annual French & Indian War Encampment each September that has proven to be popular with reenactors and the general public. Living history demonstrations, drills and skirmishes are conducted along the banks of the Hudson River.

== See also ==
- Fort Edward (town), New York
- United States Army Rangers
- Robert Rogers' 28 "Rules of Ranging"
