= Fort Miller Reformed Church Complex =

Historic church in New York, United States

- U.S. National Register of Historic Places
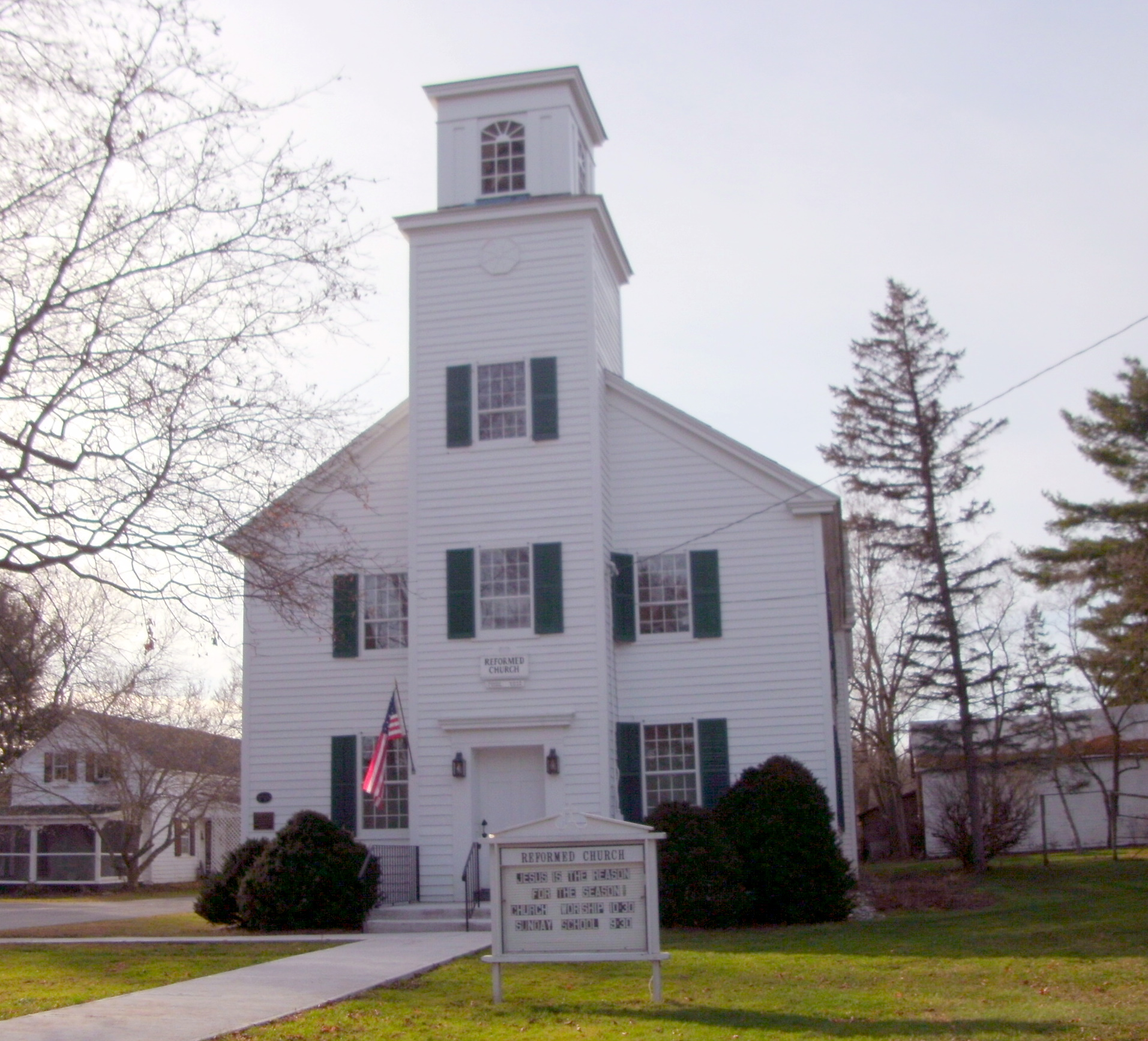
- Fort Miller Reformed Church, November 2010

- Location within New York Location within the United States
- Location: Fort Miller Rd., W of US 4 and S of Galusha Island, Fort Edward, New York
- Coordinates: 43°9′49″N 73°34′55″W
- Area: 1.1 acres (0.45 ha)
- Built: 1816; 210 years ago
- Architect: Norcross, Shepperd
- Architectural style: Federal
- NRHP reference No.: 96001431
- Added to NRHP: December 6, 1996

Fort Miller Reformed Church Complex is a historic church on Fort Miller Road, west of US 4 and south of Galusha Island and located at Fort Edward in Washington County, New York.

== History ==
The church was built in 1816. It began as a two-story, clapboard-sided sanctuary with a four-story bell tower in the Federal style, attached to a carriage and horse shed dated to around 1818–22. A two-story rear wing was added in 1896. The complex also contains a parsonage (c. 1845), custodian/tenant house (c. 1845), and a late 19th-century clapboard barn that the church now uses as rental income property.

It was listed on the National Register of Historic Places in 1996.
