= Robert Rogers' 28 "Rules of Ranging" =

Rules and guidelines for guerrilla warfare

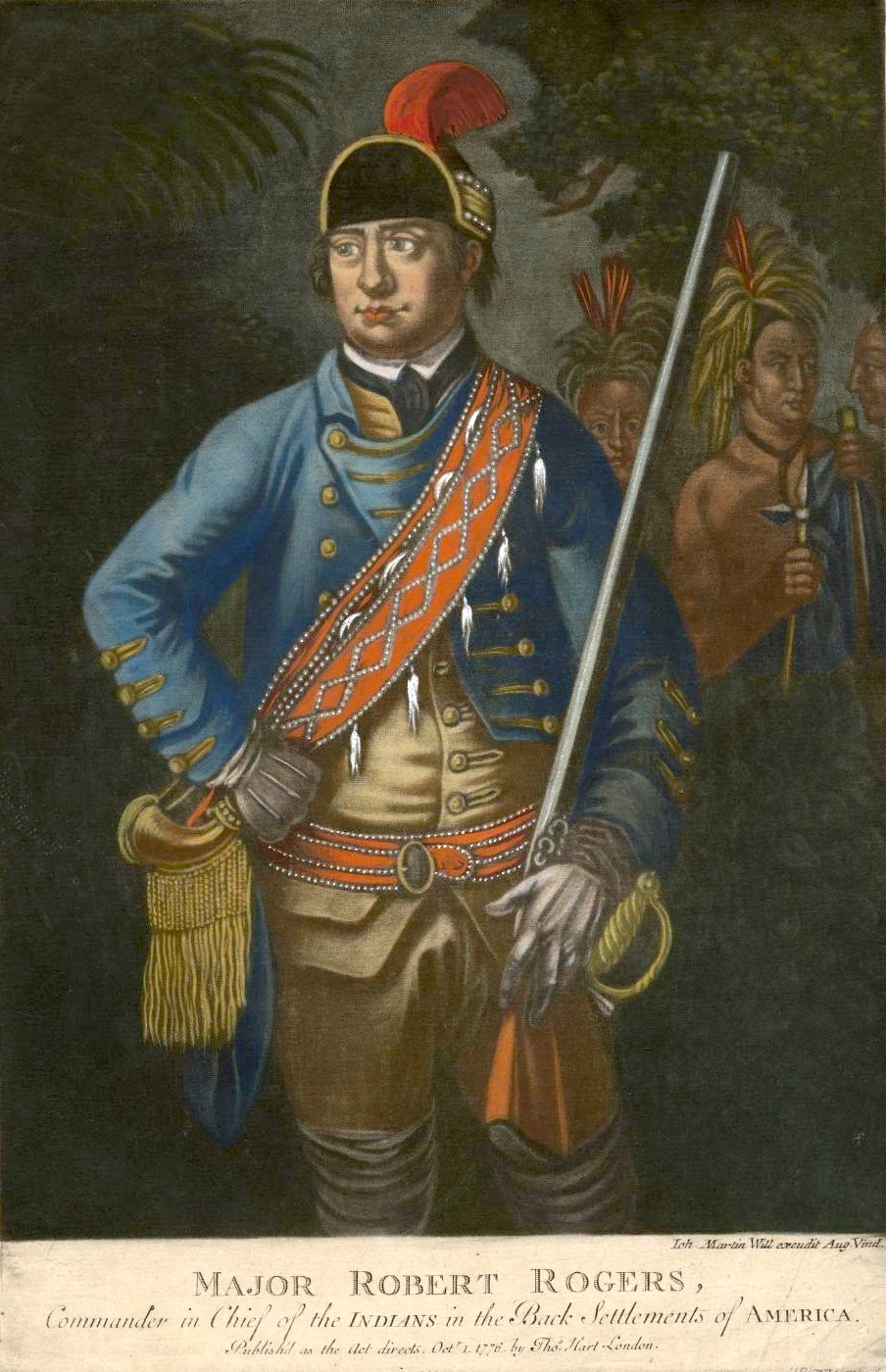
An artist's interpretation of Rogers

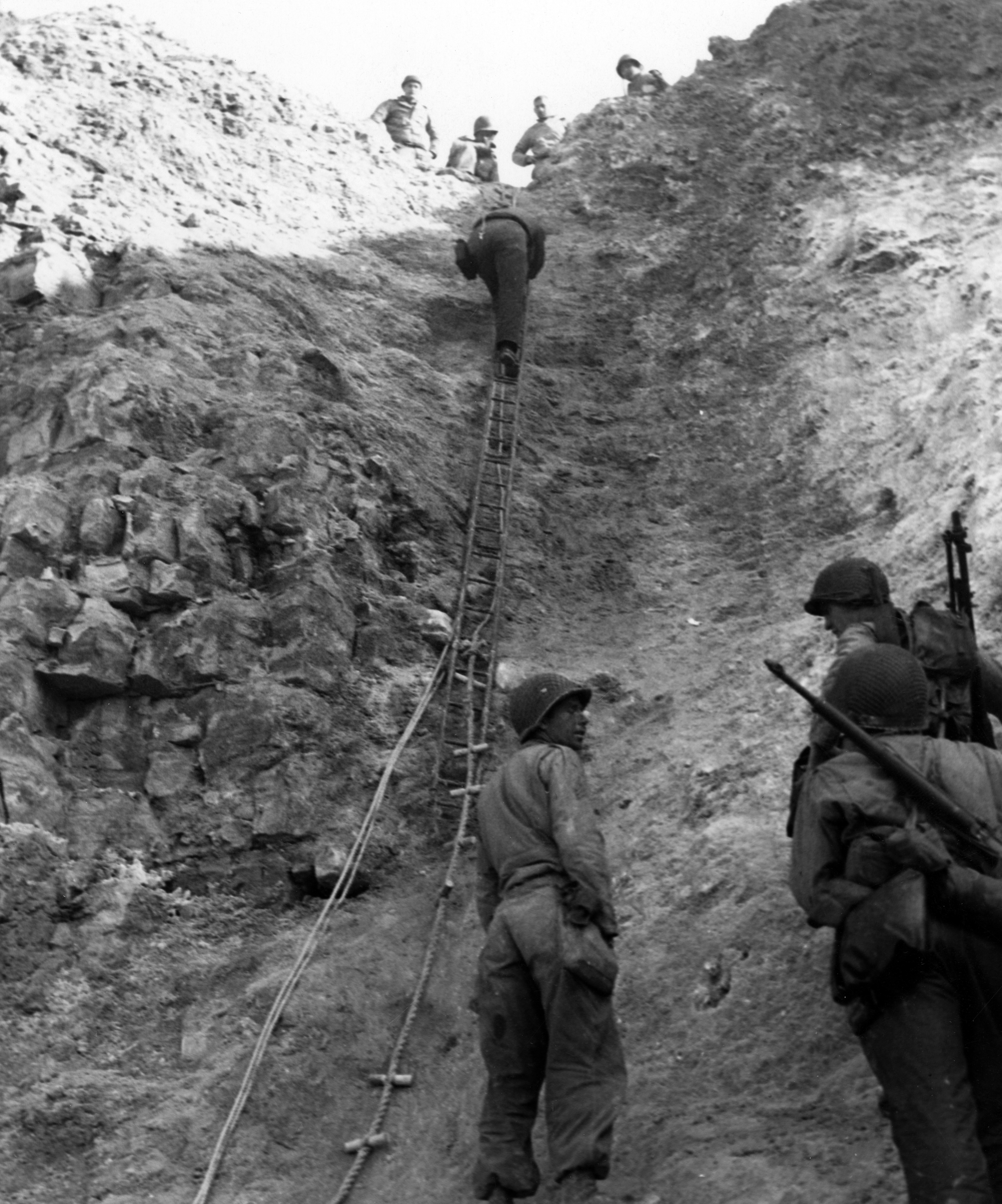
U.S. Army Rangers storm the cliffs at Pointe du Hoc on D-Day, June 6, 1944

The 28 "Rules of Ranging" are a series of rules and guidelines created by Major Robert Rogers in 1757, during the French and Indian War (1754–63).

The rules were originally written at Rogers Island in the Hudson River near Fort Edward. They were intended to serve as a manual on guerrilla warfare for Rogers' Ranger company, a 600 strong contingent whose members were personally selected by Rogers.

The rules were the result of Rogers' blend of Native American tactics and his own innovative combat techniques, ideas that were considered revolutionary by military standards of the time. Combined with intensive training and live fire exercises, these rules created a mobile, well trained force that was capable of living off the land around it in order to sustain itself for long periods of time.

Ranger commander Lt. Colonel William Darby read the rules to the 1st Ranger Battalion prior to action during World War II, and a modified version of the rules is followed by the 75th Ranger Regiment to this day, which are considered to be the model and "standing orders" for all Ranger activities.

== Publishing the rules ==
As Rogers personally selected volunteers to form the first company of Rangers, he wrote a Plan of Discipline containing 28 guidelines that he found useful from experience.

The 75th Ranger Regiment formally adopted these rules, along with Rogers' 1757 Standing Orders, in the 1950s. The Rangers still use these guidelines today.

== See also ==
- Combat tracking
- Long-range reconnaissance patrol

== Sources ==
- Rogers, Robert (1765). Journals of Robert Rogers of the Rangers. Joel Munsell's Sons.
- Military-info page Retrieved March 10, 2007
- Rogers Rangers page Retrieved March 10, 2007
- Wesclark page Retrieved March 10, 2007
- Fox News article on archaeology on Rogers Island, Retrieved March 10, 2007
