= The Archaeological Conservancy =

- Founded: Founded in 1980
- Type: 501(c)(3) Non-profit Organization
- Purpose: Acquisition and management of significant prehistoric and historic archaeological sites on private land
- Location: Albuquerque, New Mexico
- Region served: United States
- Website: http://www.americanarchaeology.org

The Archaeological Conservancy is a 501(c)(3) non-profit organization that acquires and preserves archaeological sites in the United States. Whereas nearly every other nation protects all archaeological sites within its borders as part of its national patrimony, in the United States archaeological resources on private land are the private property of the landowner. As a result, archaeological sites in the United States are subject to destruction by urban development and sprawl, mechanized agricultural and land-leveling, and commercial looting to fuel the antiquities trade. By the 1970s the extent of archaeological site loss was increasing recognized as a crisis for the scientific study of the nation's past.

== History, organization and means of operation ==
The Conservancy was established in 1979 by Mark Michel; California businessman Jay Last; and archaeologist Steven A. LeBlanc using $300,000 in start-up funds from the Rockefeller Brothers Foundation and the Ford Foundation. The organization received a boost in stature and fund-raising ability in 1982 when former Secretary of the Interior Stewart Udall joined its board of directors, where he served until his death in 2010. American archaeologists Richard B. Woodbury and Nathalie F. S. Woodbury were described as a founding board members.

The organization is headquartered in Albuquerque, New Mexico, but also operates regional offices in Mississippi, Maryland, Minnesota, and California. In 2010 it reported a membership of about 23,000.

The Archaeological Conservancy uses states' private property laws to protect archaeological sites. Typically it buys the land encompassing the sites, stabilizes the site to protect against erosion and other natural degradation, and prepares a management plan to guide the use of the property as an archaeological research preserve. The organization works closely with amateur and professional archaeologists, particularly State Historic Preservation Offices to identify sites worthy of acquisition. Funding for the organization comes from membership dues, individual contributions, corporations and foundations.

== Notable acquisitions ==
The Archaeological Conservancy has preserved portions of two World Heritage Sites. Andrews Ranch Ruin and Candelaria Pueblo are outliers of Chaco Canyon, New Mexico. The former was transferred to the Bureau of Land Management, and the latter has been incorporated into El Malpais National Monument. The Archaeological Conservancy owns three parcels at Cahokia Mounds, Illinois. The Fingerhut tract is an area of Cahokia that may have included the workshop for basalt figurine production. The Powell tract contains the remnants of the Powell Mound, the marker mound for the western boundary of the site, and Cahokia Mound 1 may have been the marker mound for the eastern boundary. In addition The Archaeological Conservancy acquired then transferred to Hopewell Culture National Historical Park major portions of the Hopewell Mound Group and the High Bank Earthworks, which along with other Hopewell Ceremonial Earthworks are on the World Heritage Conventions tentative list.

The Archaeological Conservancy has preserved seven National Historic Landmarks. The ruins of Mission Los Santos Ángeles de Guevavi, and 18th-century Spanish Mission in southern Arizona, were transferred to the National Park Service and incorporated into Tumacácori National Historical Park. The Lamoka Lake site, New York provided the evidence establishing the existence of a pre-agricultural culture in the Northeastern United States. The Silver Mound Archaeological District, Wisconsin preserves the remains of a complex of quarry pits and associated lithic workshops where Native Americans mined Hixton Orthoquartzite over several millennia. The New Philadelphia Town Site is the original site of the first town in the United States platted and registered by an African-American. The Jaketown Site in Mississippi, preserves a mound and village center associated with the Poverty Point culture. Watson Brake, Louisiana, has provided the earliest evidence of mound-building in the prehistoric United States. The Archaeological Conservancy transferred its portion of the site to the state of Louisiana.

The Archaeological Conservancy acquired the Royal Blockhouse site in 2011. It was listed on the National Register of Historic Places in 2012.

== American Archaeology magazine ==
In 1997, The Archaeological Conservancy began publishing a quarterly magazine to replace its newsletter. American Archaeology highlights groundbreaking research at archaeological sites and the rich diversity of North America’s cultural heritage. The magazine earned a Silver award in the Magazines and Bookseller's Annual Magazine Cover Contest in 2000, a Folio Award in 2008 (An Ozzie bronze for excellence in magazine design), and was recognized with two Folio Awards in 2024, an Eddie honorable mention for “Racing Tren Maya,” a feature about a passenger rail line circling the Yucatán Peninsula, and an Ozzie honorable mention for a 2024 redesign of the magazine. Several American Archaeology writers have also been recognized for the Gene S. Stuart Award which is made to honor outstanding efforts to enhance public understanding of archaeology. Awardees include: Mike Toner (2012), Julian Smith (2013), Tamara Stewart (2016), and Gayle Keck (2019)
