= Wing-Northup House =

Historic house in New York, United States

- U.S. National Register of Historic Places
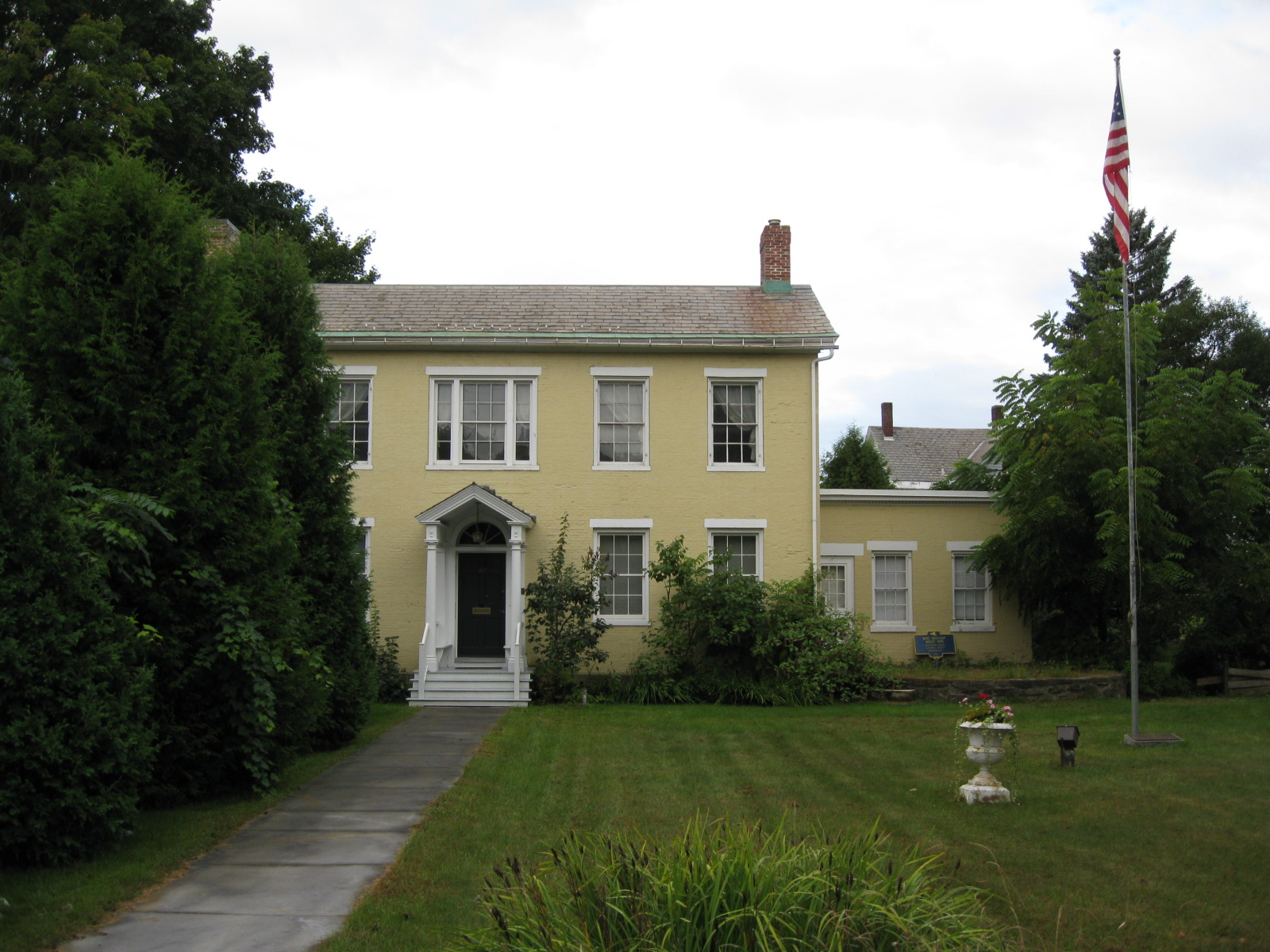
- Wing-Northup House, September 2009

- Location within New York Location within the United States
- Location: 167 Broadway, Fort Edward, New York
- Coordinates: 43°16′10.3″N 73°35′14.43″W
- Area: less than one acre
- Built: 1815
- Architectural style: Federal
- NRHP reference No.: 08000862
- Added to NRHP: September 12, 2008

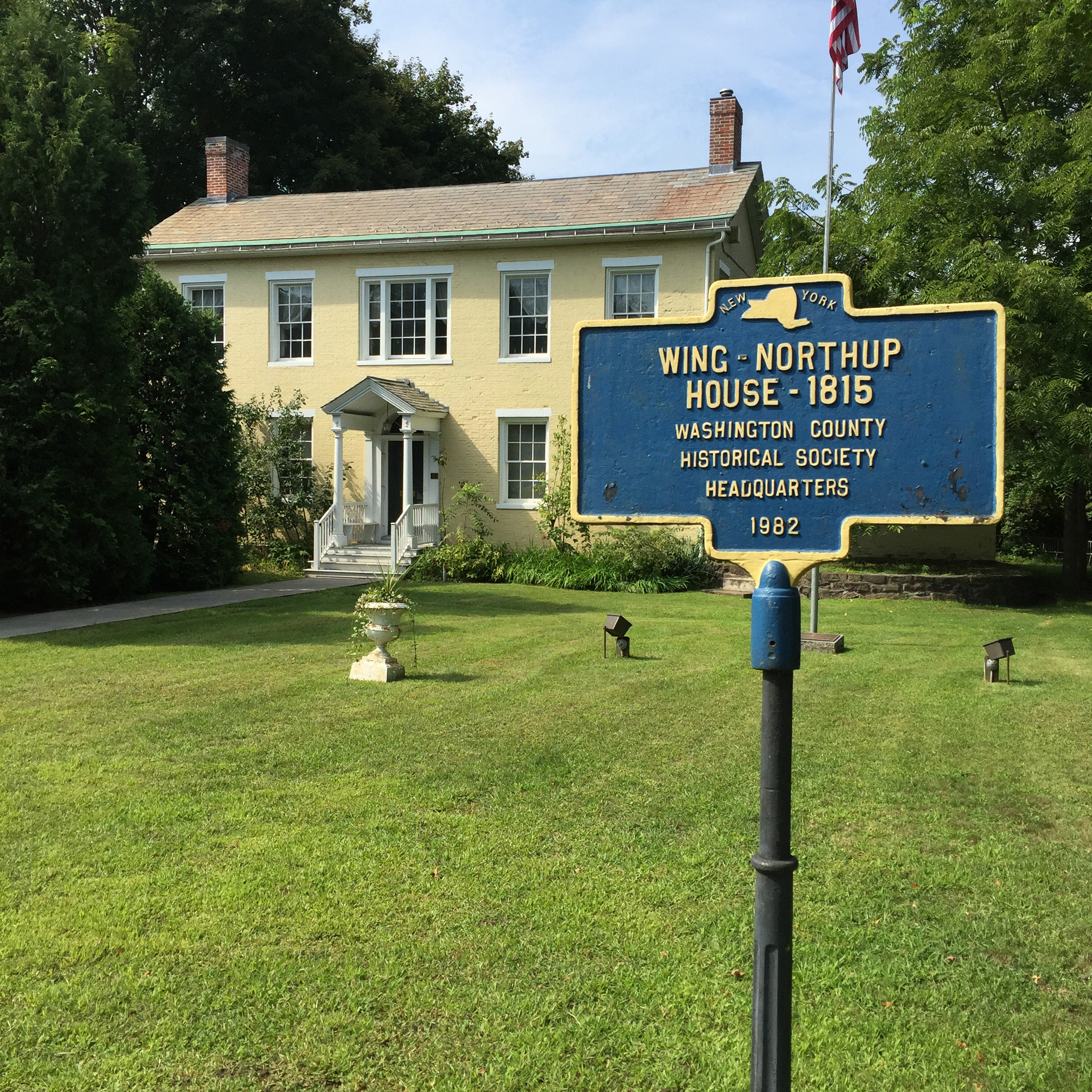
2015 photo

Wing-Northup House, also known as the Washington County Historical Society Headquarters, is a historic home located at Fort Edward in Washington County, New York. It was built about 1815 by entrepreneur Daniel Wood Wing and is a two-story, five-bay, center entrance brick front building, with a two-story brick ell. A one-story brick side wing was added about 1880. The property was acquired in 1884 by James M. Northup, and in 1982 by the Washington County Historical Society.

It was listed on the National Register of Historic Places in 2008.
