= William G. Mandeville =

American politician

William Griffin Mandeville (August 16, 1807 Kinderhook, Columbia County, New York – 1885) was an American politician and Union Army officer from New York.

== Life ==
He was the son of Jeremiah Mandeville (1774–1843) and Jesyntje (Vosburgh) Mandeville (b. 1776). He became a carriage-maker, and set up shop in the area which was separated in 1833 as the Town of Stockport, New York. He abandoned this in 1836, bought a farm, and engaged in agricultural pursuits. He was a Justice of the Peace in Stockport from 1836 to 1840. In 1837, he married Elizabeth White (1816–1895), and they had six children.

He was a member of the New York State Assembly (Columbia Co.) in 1841. In 1841, he sold the farm, removed to Stuyvesant Falls, New York, and became engaged in flour and paper mills there. In 1852, he established his own paper mill in Livingston, New York, and ran this business until 1856 when he retired.

He was a Democratic member of the New York State Senate (11th D.) in 1858 and 1859. Mandeville was appointed as Postmaster of Stuyvesant Falls in June 1858. He executed his oath and bond, and sent them to the U.S. Postal Department but, before his commission could have been issued, declined to take the office, too late realising that the acceptance of this appointment would vacate his Senate seat. Henry C. Wetmore had himself nominated, and elected at the State election in November 1858, claiming a vacancy, although no notice of such a special election had been given by the Secretary of State, and no candidates were nominated by the other parties. Mandeville appeared at the beginning of the session of 1859, and took his seat. After much debate, Mandeville's seat was declared vacant on March 16, and Wetmore was seated on April 5, 1859.

He was again nominated on the Democratic ticket for the State Senate (15th D.) in 1879, but was defeated by Stephen H. Wendover.

== Sources ==
- The New York Civil List compiled by Franklin Benjamin Hough, Stephen C. Hutchins and Edgar Albert Werner (1867; pg. 321 and 442)
- Biographical Sketches of the State Officers and Members of the Legislature of the State of New York in 1859 by William D. Murray (pg. 69ff)
- Documents of the Senate (82nd Session) (1859; Vol. 2, No. 104 and 105, arguments for and against seating Wetmore)
- Mandeville genealogy
- STATE NOMINATIONS in NYT on October 16, 1879

New York State Senate
Preceded by John W. Harcourt	New York State Senate; 11th District; 1858–1859	Succeeded by Henry C. Wetmore
