= Old Fort House (Fort Edward, New York) =

Historic house in New York, United States

- U.S. National Register of Historic Places
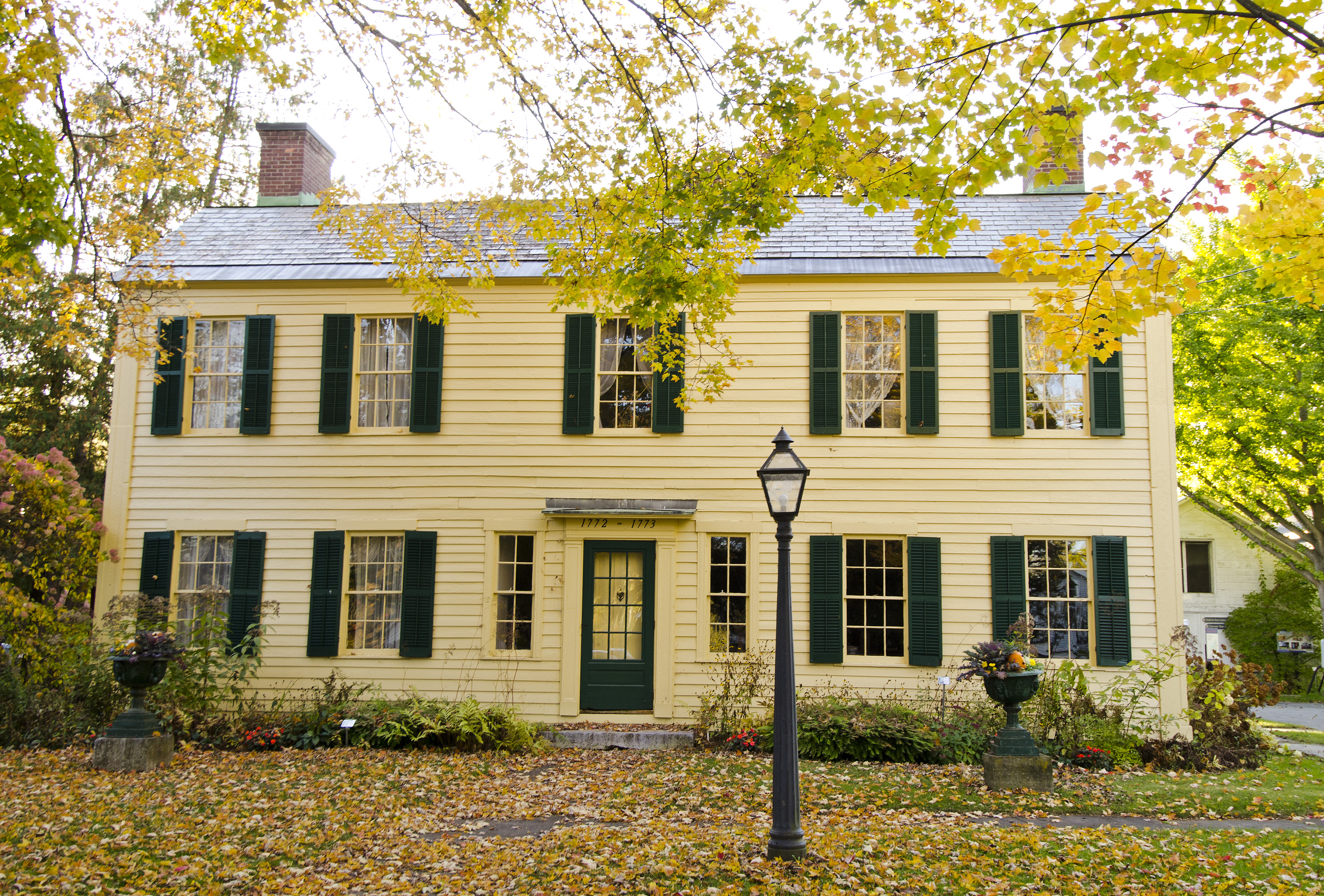

- Location within New York Location within the United States
- Location: 29 Lower Broadway, Fort Edward, New York
- Coordinates: 43°15′40″N 73°34′51″W
- Area: 4.5 acres (1.8 ha)
- Built: 1772
- Architectural style: Greek Revival, Federal
- NRHP reference No.: 83001826
- Added to NRHP: September 15, 1983

Old Fort House is a historic house at 29 Lower Broadway in Fort Edward, Washington County, New York. The house is owned by the Fort Edward Historical Association and operated as a local history museum. It was listed on the National Register of Historic Places in 1983.

== History ==
=== Revolutionary War ===
The Old Fort House is a two-story, five-bay, center hall frame building, with a shallow gambrel roof. It is one of the oldest wooden frame structures in Northern New York and was built in 1772 by Patrick Smyth from timbers salvaged from Fort Edward. Major General Philip Schuyler inspected the old fort during the Saratoga Campaign five years later, and determined that it was in no condition as a place to make a stand against General John Burgoyne, and consequently sought a location farther south. Schuyler placed Benedict Arnold in command of the army's advance guards at Fort Edward. Arnold arrested Smythe for being a Loyalist.

Baroness Frederika Charlotte Riedesel, accompanied her husband, General Friedrich Adolf Riedesel, who led a regiment of soldiers from the Duchy of Brunswick, attached to Burgoyne's army. In her memoirs, she describes the Old Fort House as "the Red House".

The house was used as headquarters by both the British and American during the Revolutionary War. It also played host to various notables such as George Washington and James Madison.

=== Solomon Northup ===
Between 1830 and 1834 Solomon and Anne Hampton Northup lived in Fort Edward and Kingsbury. The couple first set up housekeeping in the Old Fort House, which is described in his memoir, Twelve Years a Slave, as "the old yellow building". Northup's memoir was adapted as the PBS television movie Solomon Northup's Odyssey (1984) and the Oscar-winning film 12 Years a Slave (2013).

The building suffered severe fire damage in 1943.

== Museum ==
The Old Fort House is part of a seventeen-building museum complex with five structures; the Old Fort House Museum, A. Dallas Wait Law Office, Cronkhite Pavilion, Riverside Schoolhouse and Baldwin Barn Gallery open for tours daily in the summer months. It was listed as one of the best house museums in Northeastern New York and New England by author William Hosley.

Each summer the Museum hosts an Annual Country Fair & Antiques Auction.
