= Alexander B. Williams =

American politician

Member of the New York State Senate from the 25th district
- In office January 1, 1858 – December 31, 1861
- Preceded by: James Huntington
- Succeeded by: Chauncey M. Abbott

Personal details
- Born: October 29, 1815 Alexandria, Washington, D.C., U.S.
- Party: Republican
- Occupation: Politician, merchant

Alexander B. Williams (born October 29, 1815 Alexandria, then in the District of Columbia, now in Virginia) was an American merchant and politician from New York.

== Life ==
He was the son of John Williams (1780–1842) and Elizabeth Williams (1789–1858). The family removed to Sodus, Wayne County, New York in 1825. He became a clerk in a dry goods store, was made a partner in 1835, opened his own store in 1837.

In 1841, he sold his business, and entered politics instead. He was Deputy Collector of Customs at Sodus Bay from 1841 to 1845. He was also a Justice of the Peace for two terms, and Supervisor of the Town of Sodus in 1845. He was Clerk of Wayne County from 1847 to 1851. Afterwards he engaged in the real estate business, buying and selling land in Western New York.

He was a delegate to the Anti-Nebraska Party state convention in 1854. At the New York state election, 1855, he ran on the Republican ticket for New York State Treasurer, but was defeated by Know Nothing Stephen Clark.

Williams was a member of the New York State Senate (25th D.) from 1858 to 1861, sitting in the 81st, 82nd, 83rd and 84th New York State Legislatures.

In 1866, he was a Republican Delegate for Andrew Johnson.

== Sources ==
- The New York Civil List compiled by Franklin Benjamin Hough, Stephen C. Hutchins and Edgar Albert Werner (1867; pg. 442 and 537)
- Biographical Sketches of the State Officers and Members of the Legislature of the State of New York in 1859 by William D. Murray (pg. 118ff)

New York State Senate
Preceded by James Huntington	New York State Senate; 25th District; 1858–1861	Succeeded by Chauncey M. Abbott
