= Chauncey Boughton =

American politician

Chauncey Boughton (January 21, 1805 – April 3, 1895) was an American physician and politician from New York.

== Life and career ==
Boughton was born on January 21, 1805, in Nassau, New York, the son of John Boughton and Elizabeth Roberts.

Boughton initially considered a career in law, but when he was seventeen he began studying medicine in the Fairfield Medical College. He began practicing medicine when he was twenty-one, initially practicing in Mechanicville. He moved to Halfmoon shortly afterwards and practiced medicine with his brother-in-law Dr. William Shaw. He attended lectures in New York City and Philadelphia in 1833, returning home and resuming his practice later that year. Until 1845, he spent nearly twenty years active in military affairs, serving as sergeant, major, lieutenant colonel, and colonel for the 144th Regiment of Infantry.

Boughton held various town offices, including town supervisor. He was initially a Free Soil Whig, but later came to support the American Party. He was a member of the New York State Assembly in 1846, serving as one of the two representatives of Saratoga County. He was re-elected to the Assembly in 1857 with support from the American and Republican Parties, representing the Saratoga County 1st District. He served again in the Assembly in 1858 and 1859.

Boughton was president of the board of education and active in organizing the Halfmoon Academy. He had a 300-acre farm in Halfmoon. He was interested in Crescent Bridge for over thirty years, serving as its vice-president for twenty-seven years and then as its president and replacing the original wooden bridge with an iron bridge. He later moved to Waterford following his retirement. He was a member of the school board there, and during his presidency there from 1865 to 1887 he introduced regents and enlarged the old schoolhouse. He was director of the Waterford bank for thirty years and its vice-president when it was robbed in 1871.

An active Baptist since he was twenty-one, Boughton helped build the Baptist church in Halfmoon, was superintendent of the Waterford Baptist Sunday school for thirty years, and at one point was in charge of two Sunday schools in Waterford and a third in Northside. A strong supporter of the temperance movement, he was a member, state deputy, and deputy to the grand chief templar of the International Organisation of Good Templars. He was a member of the Freemasons and the Knights Templar. In 1828, he married Ida J. Smith of Vergennes, Vermont. Their children were Esther Margaret, Margaret Esther, and Smith C.

Boughton died from apoplexy on April 3, 1895. He was buried in the Waterford Rural Cemetery.

New York State Assembly
Preceded by George G. Scott	New York State Assembly; Saratoga County, 1st District; 1858–1859	Succeeded by John Fulton
