= Royal Blockhouse =

- U.S. National Register of Historic Places
- Location: Address Restricted, near Moreau, New York
- Area: 12 acres (4.9 ha)
- Built: 1758
- NRHP reference No.: 11001062
- Added to NRHP: January 31, 2012

Royal Blockhouse is a historic archaeological site located near Moreau, Saratoga County, New York. It was the site of a three-story, 90-feet square, blockhouse constructed in 1758 as part of the Fort Edward / Rogers Island complex. It was built during the French and Indian War and was part of England's largest fortification in North America during the war. The property was acquired by the Archaeological Conservancy of Albuquerque, New Mexico in 2011.

It was listed on the National Register of Historic Places in 2012.
