= Oliver M. Hungerford =

American lawyer and politician (1827–1888)

Oliver Morgan Hungerford (January 2, 1827 – June 15, 1888) was an American lawyer and politician who was a member of the New York State Assembly in 1865.

== Life ==
Hungerford was born in Berne, New York to Daniel and Hannah Hungerford with seven siblings. He pursued a career as a lawyer. On March 25, 1851, he married Almira Conger with whom he had two children. In 1865, he represented the second district of Albany County in the 88th New York State Assembly. However, he was contested by Joseph Shook, and his seat was vacated on April 12. He died on June 15, 1888, in Albany at the age of 61.

New York State Assembly
Preceded by Morgan L. Filkins	New York State Assembly; Albany County, 2nd District; 1865	Succeeded by Lyman Tremain
