= St. James Bible Fellowship =

Historic church in New York, United States

- U.S. National Register of Historic Places
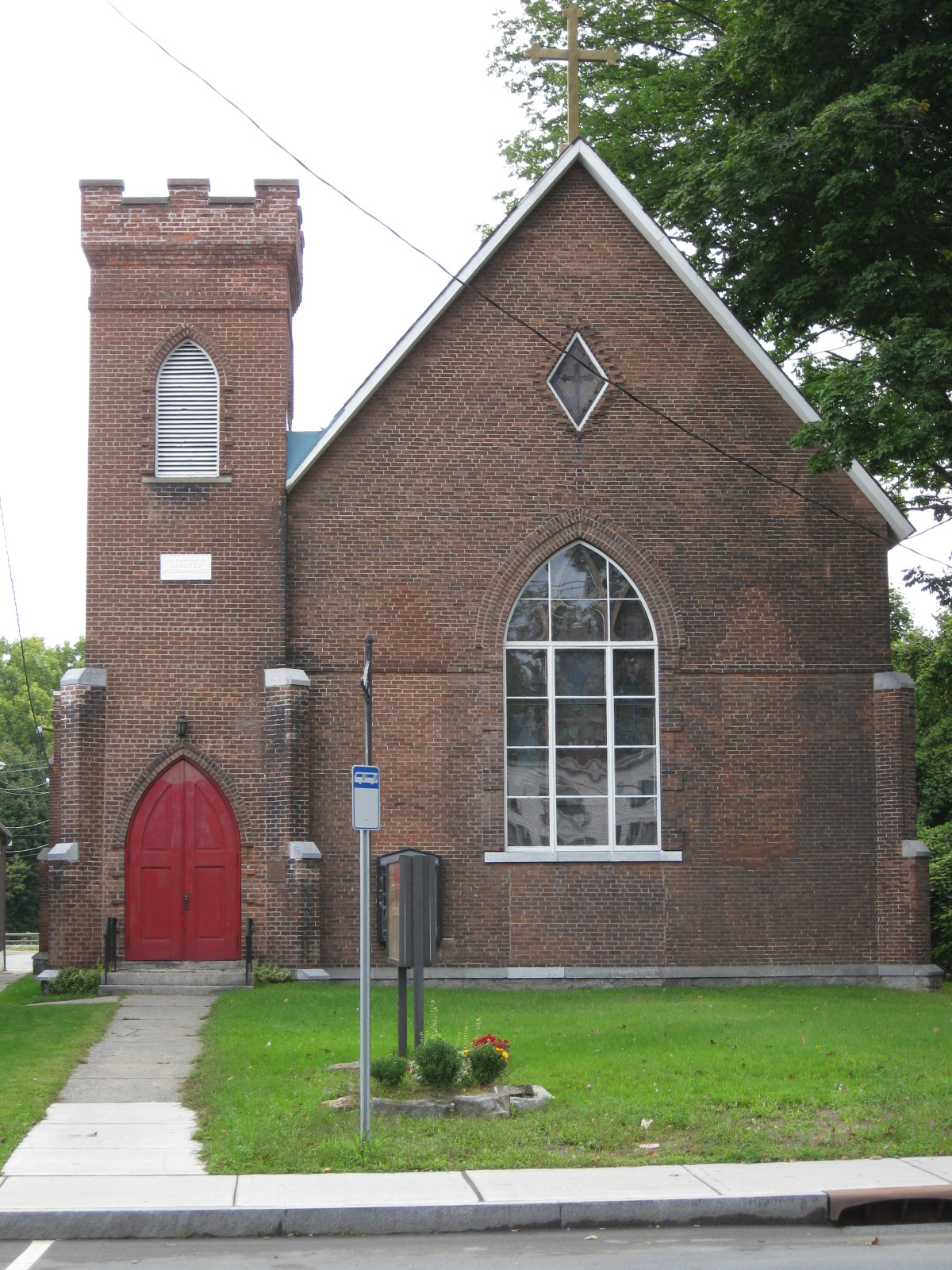
- St. James Bible Fellowship

- Location within New York Location within the United States
- Location: 112 Broadway, Fort Edward, New York
- Coordinates: 43°16′2″N 73°35′6″W
- Area: less than one acre
- Built: 1846
- Architectural style: Gothic Revival
- NRHP reference No.: 97001617
- Added to NRHP: January 7, 1998

St. James Bible Fellowship (formerly St. James Episcopal Church) is an historic church at 112 Broadway in Fort Edward in Washington County, New York. It was built in 1849 and modified in three stages in 1880, 1896, and 1914–1915. It is a Gothic Revival style ecclesiastical structure and features a side bell tower on the northwest corner of the building.

It was listed on the National Register of Historic Places in 1998.
