= William Woodbury =

Australian cricketer

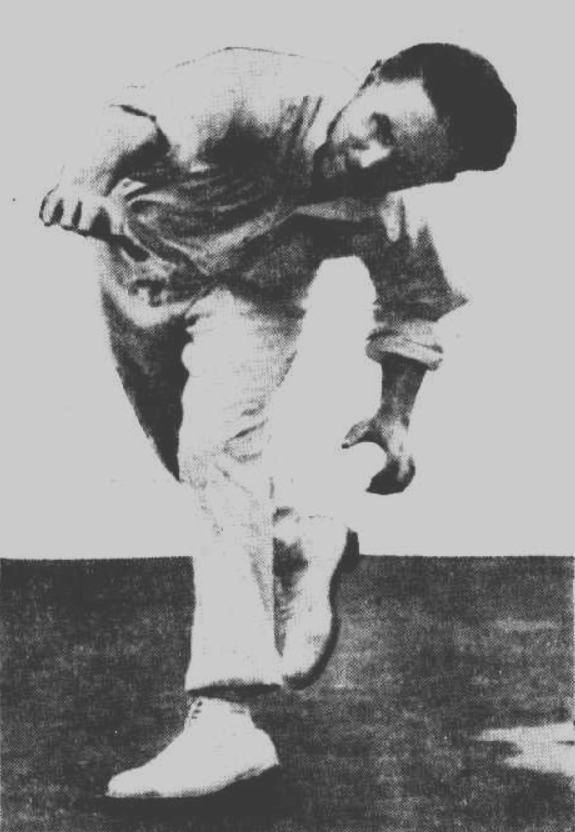

Personal information
- Born: 6 December 1892; Sydney, Australia
- Died: 31 August 1983 (aged 90); Moe, Victoria, Australia

Domestic team information
- Years: Team
- 1915: Victoria
- Source: Cricinfo, 18 November 2015

William Woodbury (6 December 1892 – 31 August 1983) was an Australian cricketer. He played one first-class cricket match for Victoria in 1915.

Woodbury began his district career with South Melbourne in 1911, and went on to top the clubs batting average in three seasons. When he was nineteen he was first selected in the Victorian Colts interstate side and in 1915 he was selected for Victoria in a First-class match against Tasmania in which he took the most wickets for the State. He later played for Northcote and was captaining the side as of 1924.

== See also ==
- List of Victoria first-class cricketers
