= Morgan L. Filkins =

American doctor and politician (1826–1896)

Morgan L. Filkins (August 20, 1826 – June 13, 1896) was an American doctor, politician, and Civil War Captain from New York.

== Life ==
Filkins was born in Berne, New York, to Richard Filkins and Catherine Angle. He was 20th of 25 children. His father volunteered in the War of 1812 before moving from Rensselaer to Albany County where he met Catherine. Filkins studied medicine in Honesdale, Pennsylvania and became engaged in the patent medicine business; he created a partnership with Charles O. Filkins called Filkins Bros. in which he made "Vegetable Sugar Coated Liver Pills". Filkins filed a suit against Jonas Blackman regarding the use of the name "Dr. J. Blackman’s Genuine Healing Balsam." He was initially a Whig in terms of politics, holding strong anti-immigration nativist views. At the age of 36, he enlisted in the Civil War and became a captain. In 1853, he married Henrietta Blackman with whom he had three children. He was a member of the New York State Assembly, representing Albany County's 2nd District, in 1859 and 1864. He died in 1896 at the age of 70 in Rochester, New York, and is buried with his wife in Albany Rural Cemetery.

New York State Assembly
Preceded by John Cutler	New York State Assembly; Albany County, 2nd District; 1859, 1865	Succeeded by Oliver M. Hungerford
