= Henry C. Wetmore =

American politician

Henry Carmer Wetmore (August 6, 1823 New York City – January 28, 1862 Philadelphia, Pennsylvania) was an American writer and politician from New York.

== Life ==
He was the son of Apollos Russell Wetmore and Mary (Carmer) Wetmore (1798–1876. He worked in his father's hardware store. In 1846, he married Mary Jane Bird, and they had four children. About 1851, he removed to Fishkill, New York, and engaged in literary pursuits.

In 1854, he published Hermit's Dell; from the Diary of A Penciller. He contributed prose and poetry to newspapers and magazines, among them Harper's Magazine.

He was a Know Nothing member of the New York State Senate (11th D.) in 1859. William G. Mandeville had been elected to this seat in 1857 for a two-year term (1858–1859). Mandeville was appointed as Postmaster of Stuyvesant Falls, New York in June 1858. He executed his oath and bond, and sent them to the U.S. Postal Department but, before his commission could have been issued, declined to take the office, too late realising that the acceptance of this appointment would vacate his Senate seat. Wetmore had himself nominated, and elected at the State election in November 1858, claiming a vacancy, although no notice of such a special election had been given by the Secretary of State, and no candidates were nominated by the other parties. Mandeville appeared at the beginning of the session of 1859, and took his seat. After much debate, Mandeville's seat was declared vacant on March 16, and Wetmore was seated on April 5, thus occupying the seat for two weeks until the adjournment on April 19, 1859.

He was buried at the New York Marble Cemetery.

== Sources ==
- The New York Civil List compiled by Franklin Benjamin Hough, Stephen C. Hutchins and Edgar Albert Werner (1867; pg. 321 and 442)
- Biographical Sketches of the State Officers and Members of the Legislature of the State of New York in 1859 by William D. Murray (pg. 71f)
- Documents of the Senate (82nd Session) (1859; Vol. 2, No. 104 and 105, arguments for and against seating Wetmore)
- Wetmore genealogy at RootsWeb
- Carmer genealogy at RootsWeb
- DEATH OF MR. A. R. WETMORE in NYT on January 22, 1881

New York State Senate
Preceded by William G. Mandeville	New York State Senate; 11th District; 1859	Succeeded by John H. Ketcham
